= The Amazing Race Vietnam 2015 =

Season of television series

- Season 2015
- Presented by: Phan Anh
- No. of teams: 8
- Winners: Trần Ngọc Anh & Đỗ Nhật Anh
- No. of legs: 11
- Distance traveled: 3,613 km (2,245 mi)
- No. of episodes: 11

Release
- Original network: VTV3
- Original release: 17 July – 25 September 2015

Additional information
- Filming dates: Early 2015

Series chronology
- ← Previous; Season 3 Next → Season 5

The Amazing Race Vietnam: Cuộc đua kỳ thú 2015 is the fourth season of The Amazing Race Vietnam, a Vietnamese reality competition show based on the American series The Amazing Race. It featured eight teams of two in a race around Vietnam for 300 million₫. This season's teams included celebrities and Amazing Race franchise fans.

The program premiered on VTV3 and aired every Friday primetime (9:00 p.m. UTC+7) from 17 July to 25 September 2015.

Phan Anh from The Voice of Vietnam replaced Huy Khánh from the previous season as the new host.

Married diving coaches Trần Ngọc Anh and Đỗ Nhật Anh were the winners of this season.

== Production ==
=== Development and filming ===
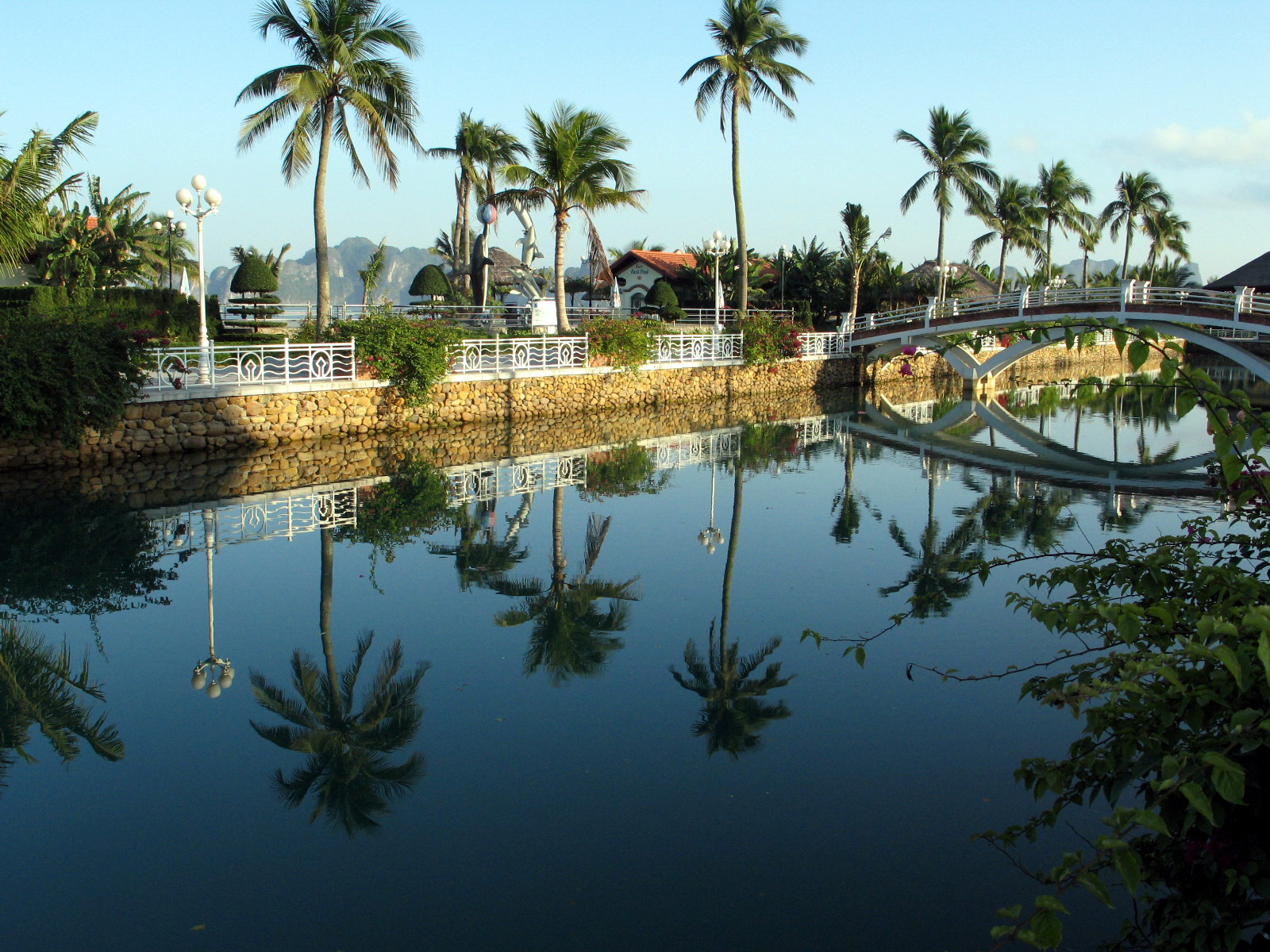
Tuần Châu island in Hạ Long hosted the start of The Amazing Race Vietnam 2015.

Filming for this season began in early 2015.

This season was the first time an Amazing Race franchise visited the nation of Laos, a country which was not visited by the original American edition until Season 31 four years later, as the international destination for the season.

This season saw modifications for the penalties in a non-elimination leg. While the usual stripping of money penalty remained, the "Marked for Elimination" penalty increased from 30 minutes to 45 minutes with the exception of Leg 2, which remained at 30 minutes. This is currently the only season in the Vietnamese edition where the U-Turn was absent.

== Cast ==
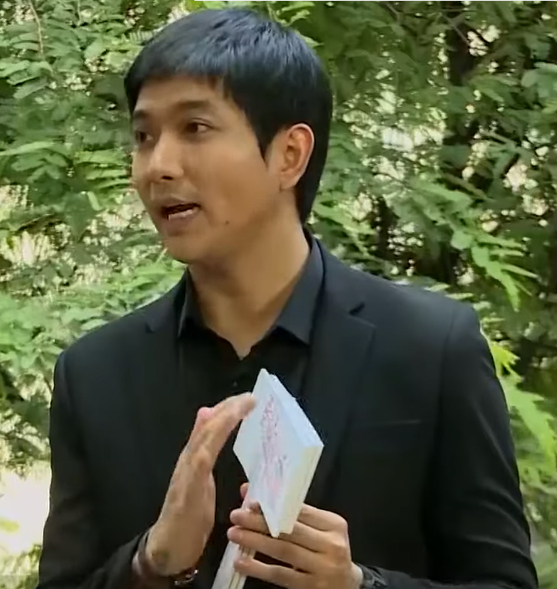
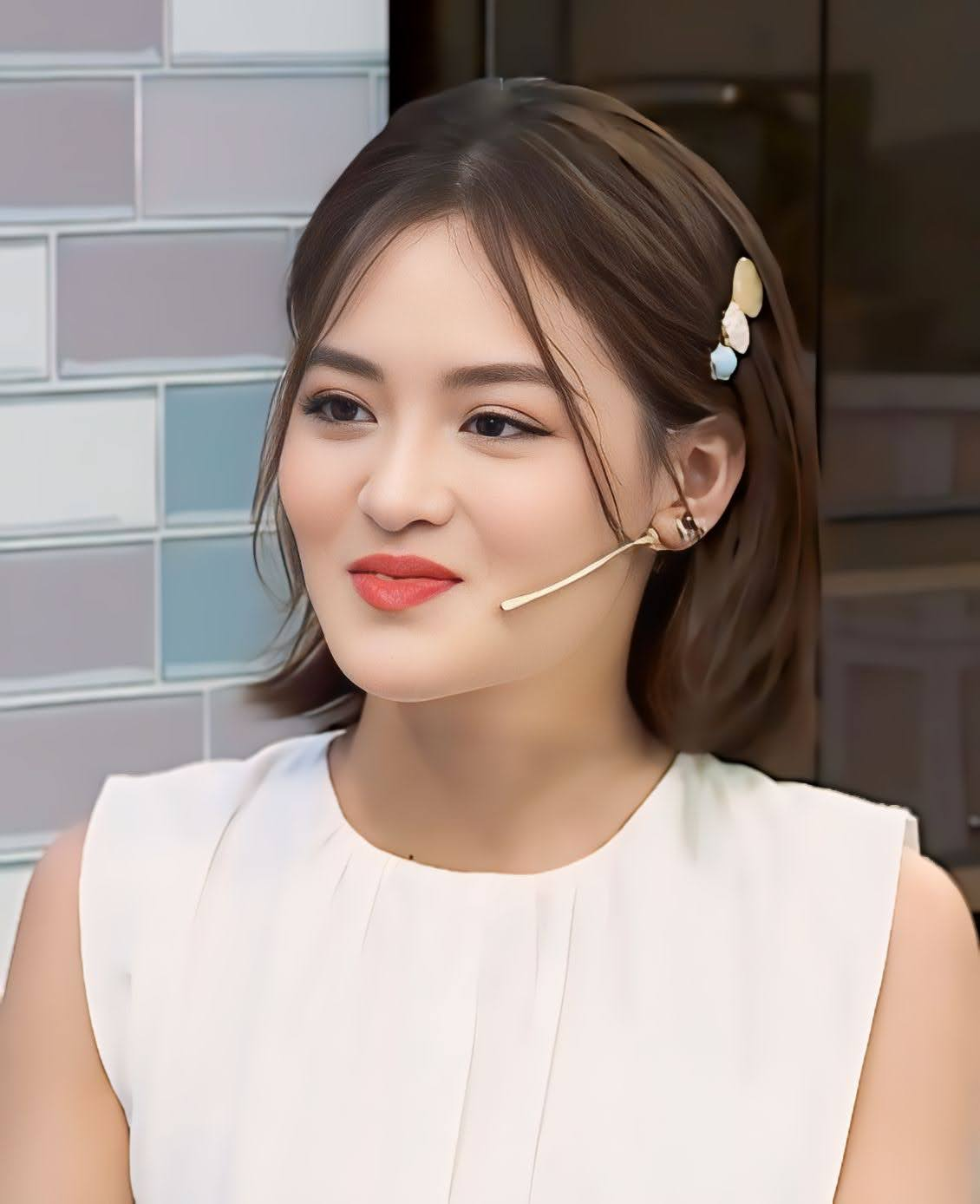
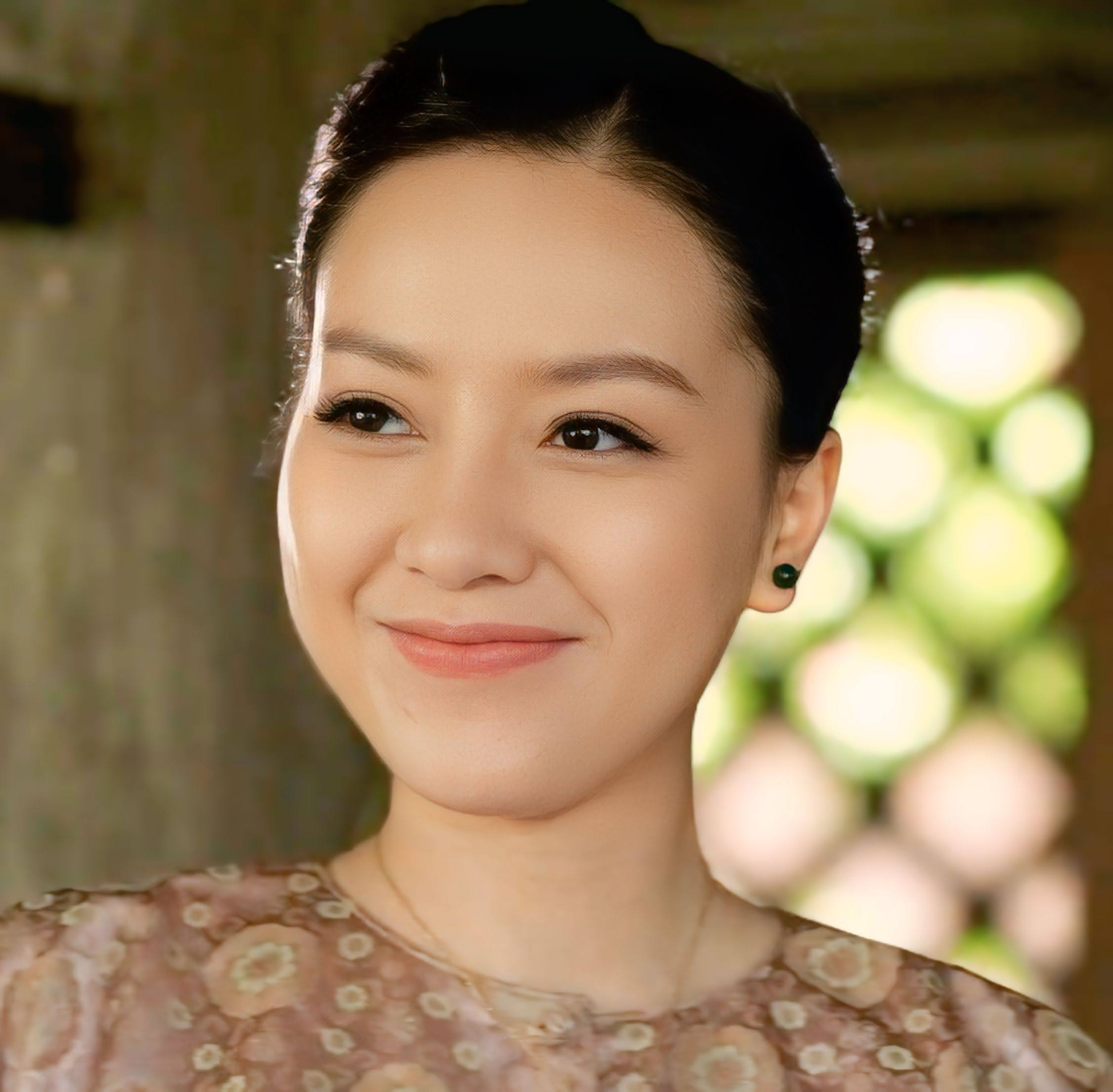
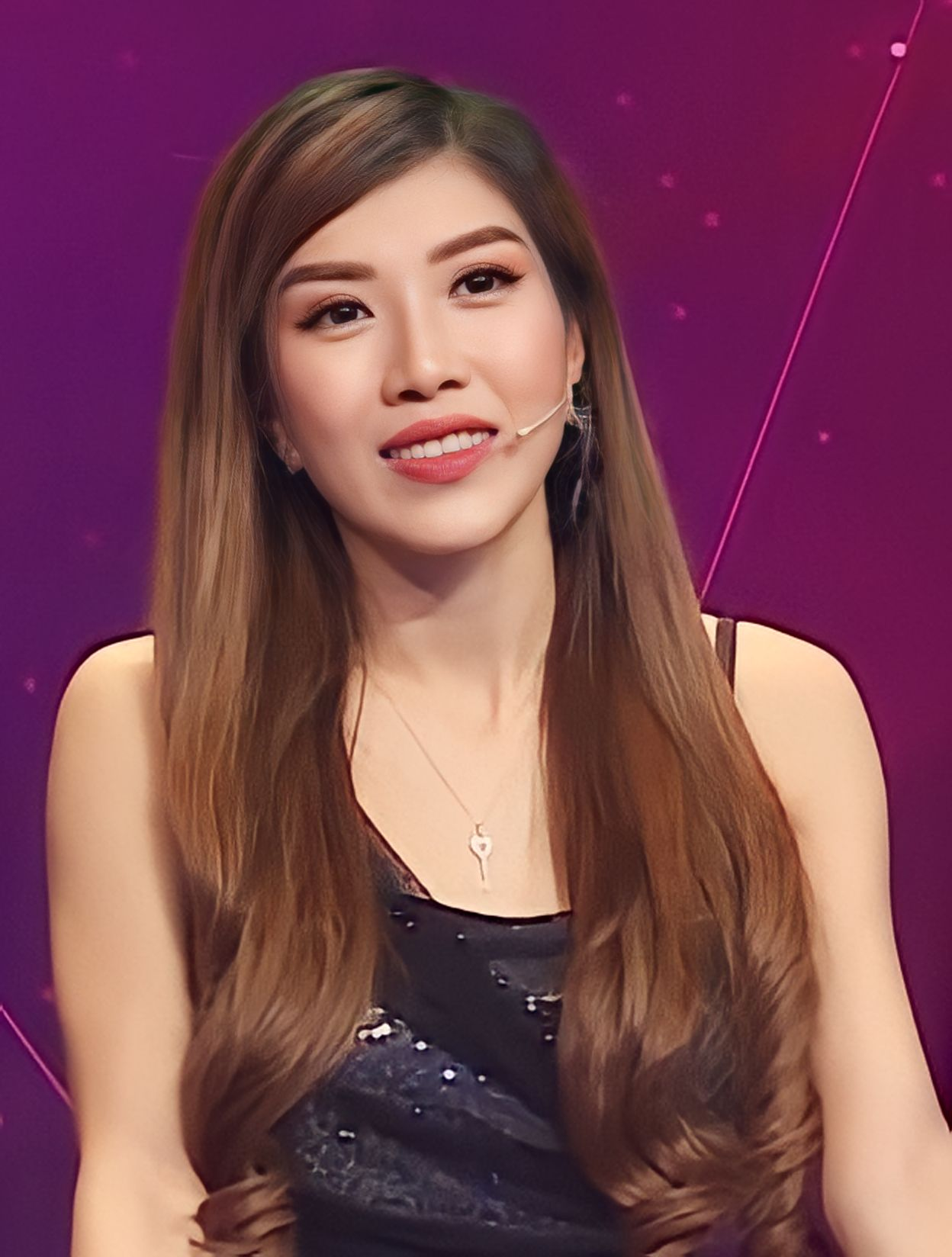
From left to right: Tim, Thùy Anh, Băng Di and Trang Pháp

Like the past two seasons, the cast mainly featured celebrity teams; however, this season also included non-celebrity teams, who were dubbed as "fans". This season also featured the lowest number of teams with eight, which tied with The Amazing Race China, which also featured eight celebrity teams.

Contestants	Age	Profession	Hometown	Status
Cát Vũ "Tim" Trần Nguyên	30	Singer	Ho Chi Minh City	Eliminated 1st (in Hanoi)
Anh Đức Tạ	28	Comedian	Ho Chi Minh City	Eliminated 1st (in Hanoi)
Phạm Thị "Song Ngư" Diễm Chi	22	Actress	Cần Thơ	Eliminated 2nd (in Vinh, Nghệ An)
Trúc Như Nguyễn Vũ	24	Actress	Tân An, Long An	Eliminated 2nd (in Vinh, Nghệ An)
Phương Ly Nguyễn	25	Office Worker	Hanoi	Eliminated 3rd (on Little Island, Quảng Ngãi)
Nam Joo Young	27	Office Worker	Seoul, South Korea	Eliminated 3rd (on Little Island, Quảng Ngãi)
Nam Thành Trương	24	Model	Trà Vinh, Trà Vinh	Eliminated 4th (in Nha Trang, Khanh Hoa)
Hải "Băng" Huyền Nguyễn	27	Singer	Hanoi	Eliminated 4th (in Nha Trang, Khanh Hoa)
Đăng Hoàng Phạm Ngô	24	Actor	Hanoi	Eliminated 5th (in Da Lat, Lâm Đồng)
Thùy Anh Nguyễn	20	Actor	Hanoi	Eliminated 5th (in Da Lat, Lâm Đồng)
Bảo Trinh "Băng Di" Nguyễn	26	Actor	Ho Chi Minh City	Third Place
Thùy Trang "Pháp" Nguyễn Phạm	25	Singer	Hanoi	Third Place
Chí Thành Trần	29	Hotel Manager	Hanoi	Second Place
Thúc Lĩnh "Lincoln" Dương Hồng	25	Student	Paris, France	Second Place
Nhật Anh Đỗ	25	Diving Coach	Ho Chi Minh City	Winners
Ngọc Anh Trần	34	Diving Coach	Ho Chi Minh City	Winners

=== Future appearances ===
Đăng Hoàng Phạm Ngô and Thùy Anh Nguyễn, and Phạm Thị "Song Ngư" Diễm Chi and Trúc Như Nguyễn Vũ, as well as Thúc Lĩnh "Lincoln" Dương Hồng who competed on a composite team, later returned in the fifth season which aired the following year. Ngọc Anh & Nhật Anh appeared in a task during the tenth leg of the same season.

== Results ==
The following teams participated in the season, with their relationships at the time of filming. Note that this table is not necessarily reflective of all content broadcast on television due to inclusion or exclusion of some data. Placements are listed in finishing order:

Team	Position (by leg)											Roadblocks performed
Team	1	2	3	4	5	6	7	8	9	10	11	Roadblocks performed
Ngọc Anh & Nhật Anh	1st	2nd	1st	1st	5thε^{8}	1st	6th	1st^{10}	1st	2nd	1st	Ngọc Anh 4, Nhật Anh 5
Chí Thành & Lincoln	3rd	5th	4th	2nd	4th	6th	5th	2nd	2nd	1stƒ	2nd	Chí Thành 4, Lincoln 4
Băng Di & Trang Pháp	8th	8th^{2}	5th	7th^{6}	3rd	4th	2nd	5th	4th	3rd^{12}	3rd	Băng Di 5, Trang Pháp 4
Đăng Hoàng & Thùy Anh	5th	7th	7th^{4}	5th	2nd	2nd	4th	3rd	3rd	4th		Đăng Hoàng 5, Thùy Anh 4
Nam Thành & Hải Băng	2nd	6th	2nd	6th^{6}	1st	5th	1st	4th	5th			Nam Thành 4, Hải Băng 4
Phương Ly & Joo Young	7th	4th	3rd^{3}	4th	6th	3rd	3rd	6th^{11}				Phương Ly 3^{3}, Joo Young 4
Song Ngư & Trúc Như	6th^{1}	3rd	6th	3rd^{6}	7th^{9}	7th						Song Ngư 3, Trúc Như 2
Tim & Anh Đức	4th	1st	8th^{4} ^{5}	8th^{7}								Tim 2, Anh Đức 1

Key

- A red team placement means the team was eliminated.
- A green ƒ indicates that the team won a Fast Forward.
- A purple ε indicates that the team decided to use the Express Pass on that leg.
- A blue team's placement indicates that the team came in last on a non-elimination leg.
  - An underlined blue placement indicates that the team was "marked for elimination" and had to come in first on the next leg, otherwise they would be served a 30-minute (Leg 1) or 45-minute (Legs 3 & 7) penalty.
  - An italicized blue placement indicates that the team would not receive any money at the start of the next leg.
- An underlined leg number indicates that there was no mandatory rest period at the Pit Stop and all teams were ordered to continue racing. An underlined team placement indicates that the team came in last and was not eliminated.

Notes

1. Song Ngư & Trúc Như initially arrived 6th, but were issued a 15-minute penalty for not riding in an officially licensed taxi. This did not affect their placement.
2. Băng Di & Trang Pháp initially arrived 4th, but were issued a 30-minute penalty for being "marked for elimination" and not arriving 1st. The last four teams trailing them checked-in during their penalty time, dropping Băng Di & Trang Pháp to last place; however, they were notified the Leg was non-elimination, and the remaining penalty would be assessed at the start of the next leg.
3. Phương Ly failed to complete the Roadblock on Leg 3, and she & Joo Young were issued a 2-hour penalty at the Roadblock site.
4. Đăng Hoàng & Thùy Anh and Tim & Anh Đức were each issued 15-minute penalties for damaging the base of their Hmong horn. At that time they were the only two teams left to check in at that point, but because Tim & Anh Đức were issued another penalty (see note 5), Đăng Hoàng & Thùy Anh's placement moved up to 7th, and their 15-minute penalty would instead be assessed at the start of the next leg.
5. Tim & Anh Đức were further issued their 30-minute penalty as Tim held onto the guide rope during the Roadblock, which was explicitly prohibited in the clue. Their 45-minute penalty caused them to fall to last place; however, they were notified the Leg was non-elimination, and their 45-minute penalty would instead be assessed at the start of the next leg.
6. Song Ngư & Trúc Như, Nam Thành & Hải Băng and Băng Di & Trang Pháp could not complete the ice rink challenge within two tries; each teams were issued 15-minute penalties at the site before receiving their next clue.
7. Tim & Anh Đức initially arrived 5th, but were issued a 45-minute penalty for being "marked for elimination" and not arriving 1st. The last three teams trailing them (Đăng Hoàng & Thùy Anh, Nam Thành & Hải Băng and Băng Di & Trang Pháp) checked-in during the penalty time, dropping Tim & Anh Đức to last place and resulting in their elimination.
8. Nhật Anh & Ngọc Anh used their Express Pass to bypass the money-making challenge on Leg 5.
9. Song Ngư & Trúc Như did not complete the money-making challenge at Luang Prabang Night Market and were issued a 2-hour penalty before receiving their next clue.
10. Because Ngọc Anh & Nhật Anh finished 1st, their 45-minute "marked for elimination" penalty was nullified.
11. Phương Ly & Joo Young did not complete the task at Thoi Loi Mountain and were issued a 2-hour penalty before receiving their next clue.
12. Băng Di & Trang Pháp failed the task at Tran Phu High School twice, so they forfeited their opportunity to choose between their next clue and the suitcase with money.

== Prizes ==
- Leg 1 – The Express Pass (Thẻ Ưu Tiên)
- Leg 7 – Two InterContinental Danang Sun Peninsula Resort Vouchers
- Leg 11 – 300,000,000₫

== Race Summary ==
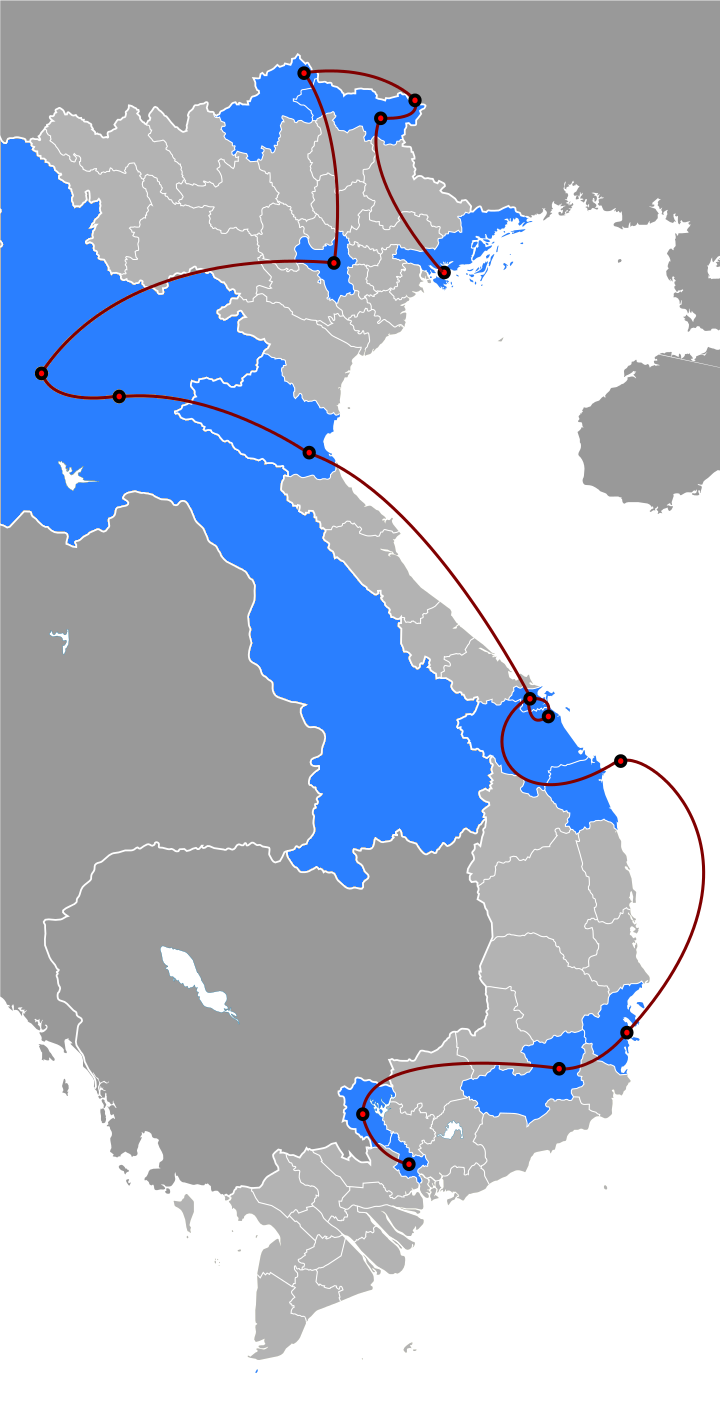
Route of The Amazing Race Vietnam 2015.

Destinations	Air travel Rail travel Water travel Bus travel Helicopter travel Bicycle travel Gondola travel
Route Markers	Lựa chọn kép (Detour) Vượt rào (Roadblock) Nhảy cóc (Fast Forward) Về đích (Pit Stop)

=== Leg 1 (Quảng Ninh) ===
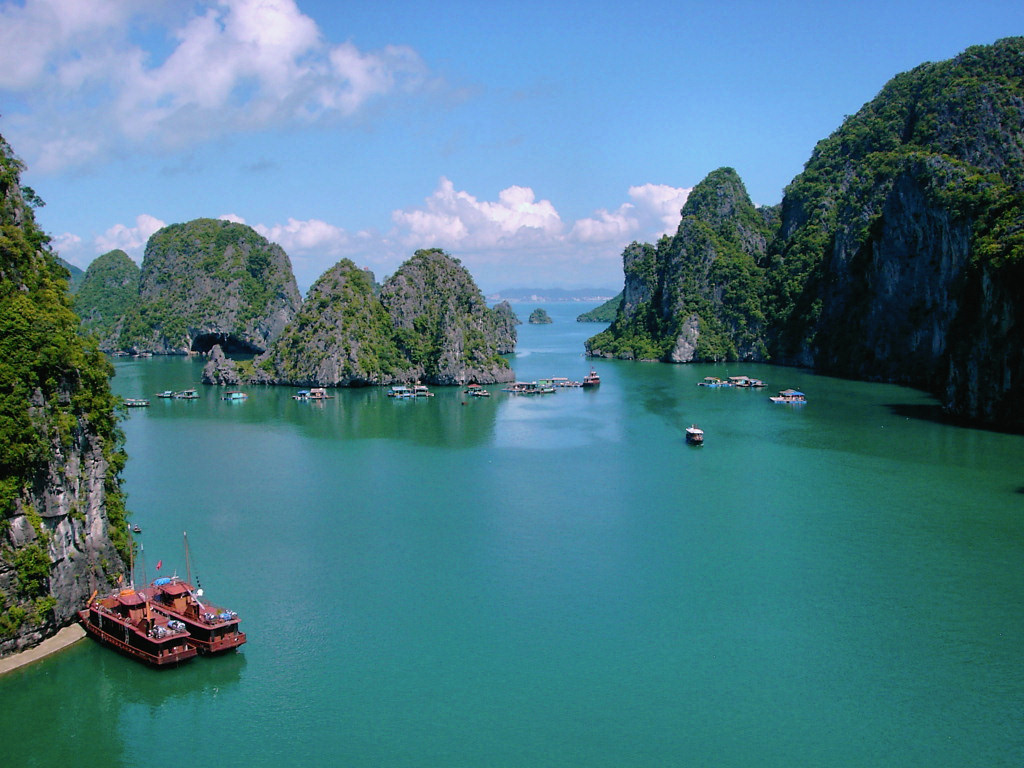
The islands of Hạ Long Bay were visited during the first leg.

Airdate: 17 July 2015

- Hạ Long, Quảng Ninh Province, Vietnam (Tuần Châu – Bến phà Tuần Châu) (Starting Line)
- Hạ Long (Bãi Cháy Tourist Wharf)
- Hạ Long (Hạ Long Bay)
- Cát Hải District (Luon Cave)
- Hạ Long (Quảng Ninh Museum and Library)
- Cẩm Phả (Quảng Ninh Coal Mine)
- Hạ Long (Bai Tho 1 Bridge)

This season's first Detour was a choice between Museum or Library. In Museum, teams had to find the museum section, where they would be given five cards containing brief information about a selection of artifacts. Teams would have to search the museum and place the cards with the correct artifacts to receive their next clue. In Library, teams made their way to the library section, where the librarian would give teams 30 books which had to be arranged in the respective shelves in the correct position to receive their next clue.

Additional tasks

- At Bến phà Tuần Châu, a drone would deliver the first clue, which instructed teams to travel together by tandem bicycle to Bãi Cháy Tourist Wharf to find their next clue.
- At Bãi Cháy Tourist Wharf, teams had to board a sampan and then paddle their boats through Hạ Long Bay following a series of arrows until they reached an island with an Amazing Race flag and their next clue.
- After finding the marked island, teams had to row to Luon Cave and search among several bottles until they found one with the Amazing Race icon, which they had to bring to a nearby floating village to exchange it for their next clue.
- At the Quảng Ninh Coal Mine, teams had to transport 150 kilograms (330 lb) of coal one kilometre (0.62 mi) along the mine using a wheelbarrow to a designated location to receive their next clue from a coal miner.

=== Leg 2 (Quảng Ninh → Cao Bằng) ===
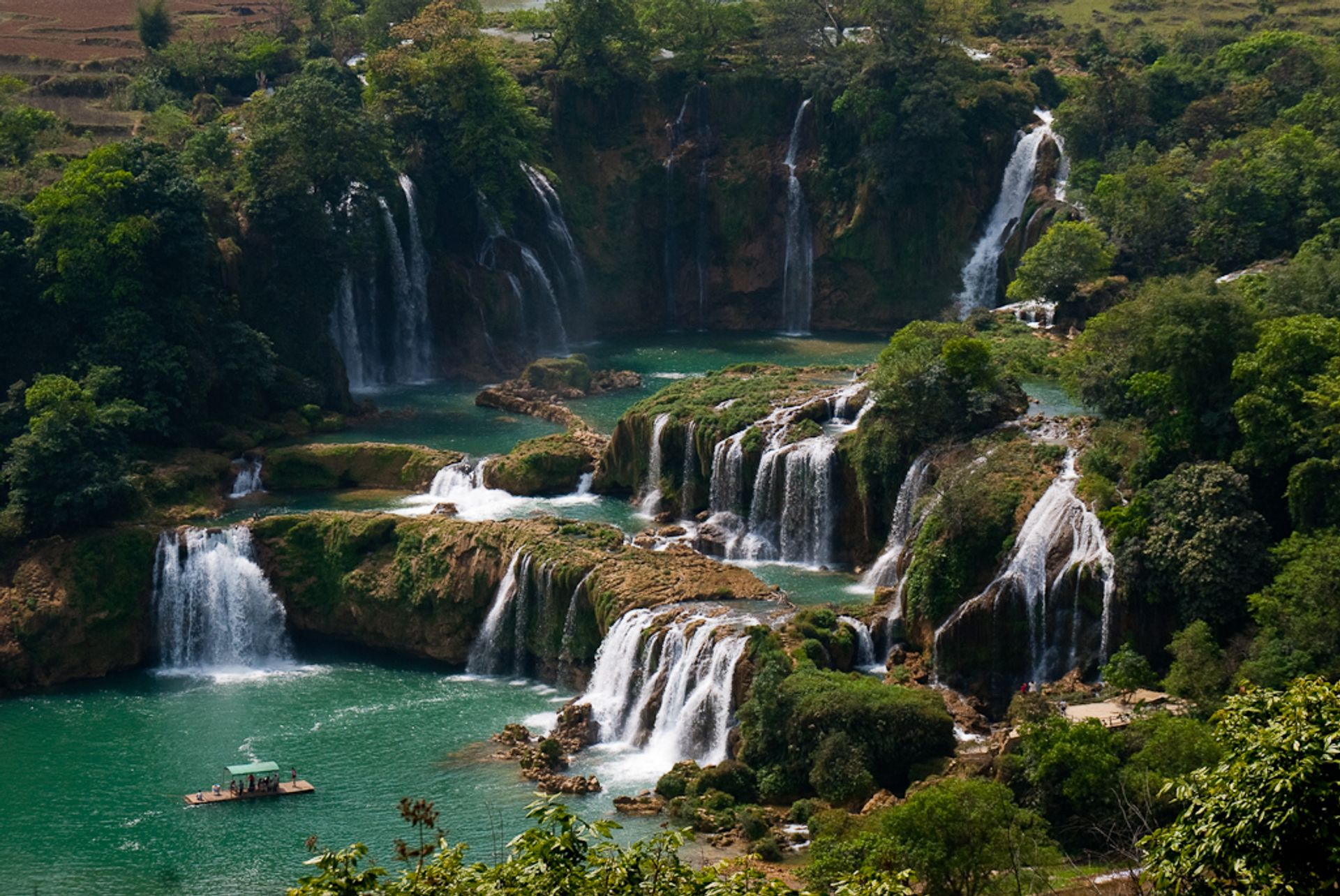
After racing through the Cao Bằng Province, teams ended the second leg at Ban Gioc–Detian Falls.

Airdate: 24 July 2015

- Cao Bằng, Cao Bằng Province (Bằng Giang Bridge)
- Quốc Toản (Thang Hen Lake (in Vietnamese))
- Phúc Sen (Phúc Sen Primary School or Quang Uyen Stadium)
- Phúc Sen (Phia Trang Dưới Village)
- Pác Rằng (Village Houses) (Overnight Rest)
- Pác Rằng (Pác Rằng Smithy)
- Đàm Thuỷ (Ban Gioc–Detian Falls)

This leg's Detour was a choice between Arrange or Curving. In Arrange, teams made their way to a field near Phuc Sen Primary School. There, one team member had to climb atop a bamboo tower and had to instruct their to arrange bamboo sticks in a series of patterns. If they arranged the bamboo sticks correctly within four minutes, they would receive their next clue. In Curving, teams made their way to Quang Uyen Stadium, where they had observe a three-minute dragon dance performance performed by locals. Teams had to join the group with one member taking the role of the dragon's head and the other member holding the ball that leads the dance. If teams performed the dance incorrectly, they would receive a ten-minute penalty. Once teams performed the routine correctly, they would receive their next clue.

In this season's first Roadblock, one team member was provided with tools for harvesting corn. They had to go to the corn fields and harvest 20–23 kg (44-50 lbs) before bringing it to the farmer. If the weight corn brought back was within the accepted range, teams would receive their next clue. Otherwise, teams would receive a 15-minute penalty before receiving their next clue.

Additional tasks

- At Thang Hen Lake, teams had to build a bamboo raft using provided tools and materials. Once built, teams had to cross to the other side of the lake, retrieve two ducks from a pen, and then cross back to exchange the ducks for their next clue.
- After the Roadblock, teams had to travel to the village of Pác Rằng and search the village houses for one that would accommodate them for the night. If the teams found a house occupied with another team, they had to continue searching until they found a vacant one.
- At Pác Rằng's smithy, teams had to forge a knife by using the provided materials and following the instructions of the local blacksmith to receive their next clue.

=== Leg 3 (Cao Bằng → Hà Giang) ===
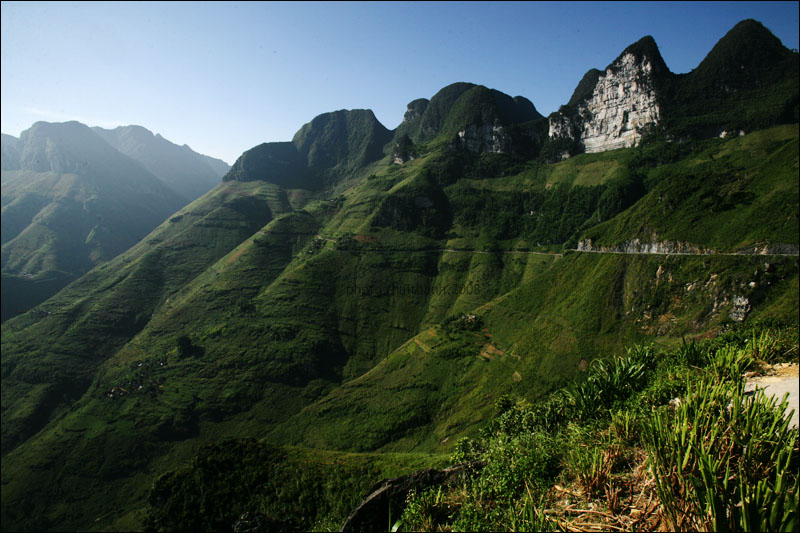
The Mã Pí Lèng Pass hosted the third Pit Stop.

Airdate: 31 July 2015

- Niêm Sơn, Hà Giang Province (Bản Tòng)
- Mèo Vạc (Dốc Tò Đú)
- Pả Vi (Bản Suối Kạn or People's Committee)
- Mèo Vạc (District Stadium) (Overnight Rest)
- Mèo Vạc (Hạnh Phúc Road)
- Mèo Vạc (Marked House)
- Pải Lủng (Mã Pí Lèng Pass)

In this leg's Roadblock, one team member had to traverse a rope over two cliffs within a time limit based on the gender of the member performing the Roadblock (10-minutes for male racers, 15-minutes for female racers). If the team member managed to traverse the rope successfully, they would receive their next clue.

This leg's Detour was a choice between Music or Cuisine. In Music, teams made their way to village of Bản Suối Kạn. Once there, teams would listen to a Hmong folk song and had 10 minutes to memorize the lyrics. They would then sing the lyrics and, if they performed correctly, they would receive their next clue. In Cuisine, teams made their way to the People's Committee of Pa Vi Commune. There, teams drew slips of paper to determine the two colors used for the task. Then, they had to use the corresponding plants to make a color dye and color rice. When the rice was dyed to the correct color, they would receive their next clue.

Additional tasks

- At District Stadium, each team member had to use either a long and short board to navigate atop six different platforms. Teams were not allowed to move the platforms, and the planks nor team members could touch the ground otherwise they had to return to the start. Teams would depart the stadium in the morning based on the order they finished the task.
- At Hạnh Phúc Road, teams had to search for a marked building on the stretch of road before Đồng Văn. Teams would have to carry two 15-kilogram (33 lb) bundles of grass two kilometres (1.2 mi) to a family to receive their next clue.
- After delivering the grass, teams had to follow a path to a marked house. There, teams had to assemble a đing nǎm, using a complete instrument as a reference, and calibrate the pipes until the pitch was in tune to receive their next clue.

=== Leg 4 (Hà Giang → Hanoi) ===
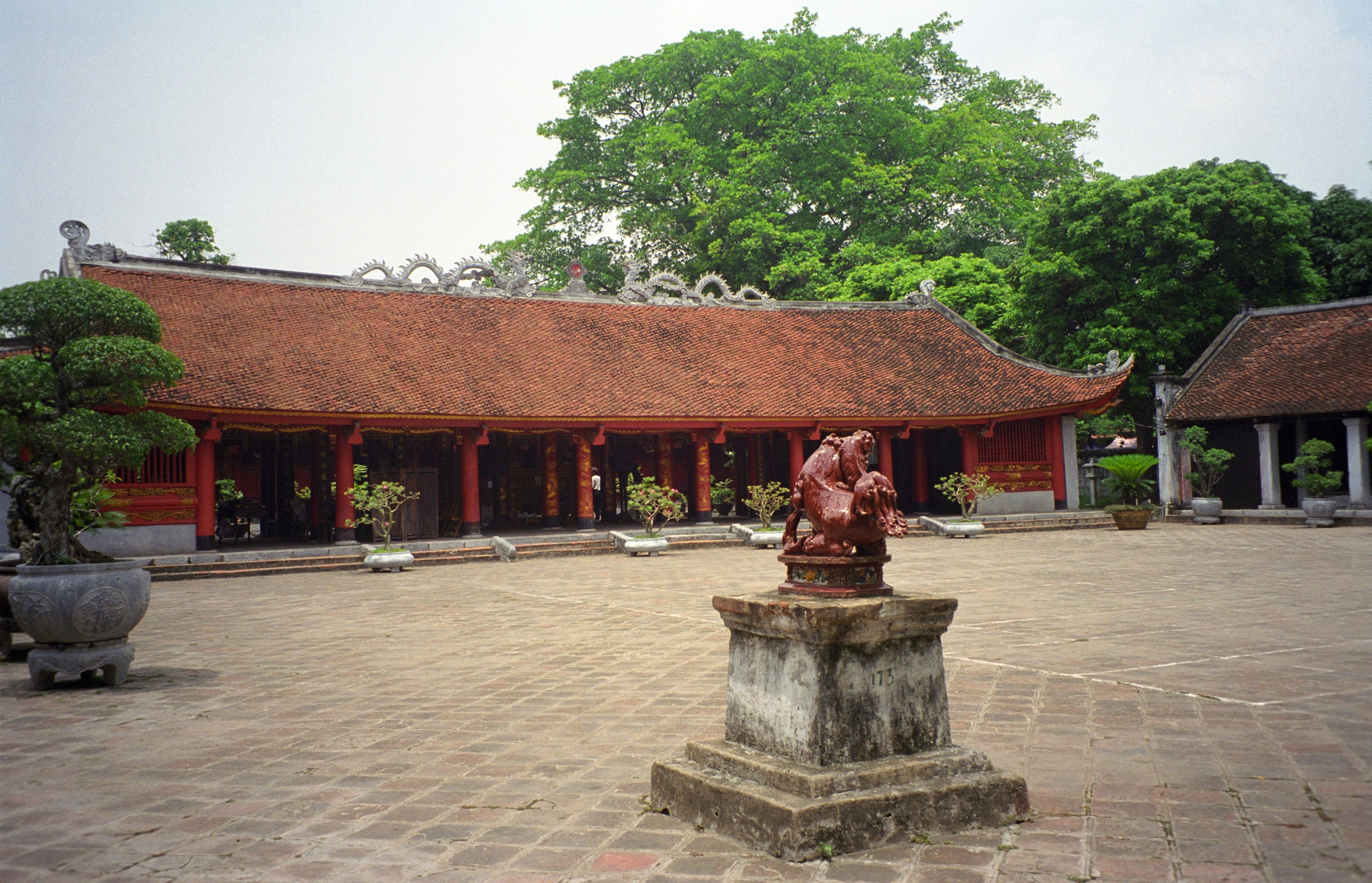
At the Temple of Confucius in Hanoi, teams had to take part in a human-sized game of cờ tướng.

Airdate: 7 August 2015

- Hanoi (Vincom Mega Mall Royal City)
- Cổ Đông (Cultural Tourism Village) or Sài Sơn (Thay Pagoda)
- Hanoi (Temple of Confucius)
- Hanoi (Tạ Hiện & Lương Ngọc Quyến Intersection)
- Hanoi (Lê Thánh Tông Flower Garden)

This leg's Detour was a choice between Adventure or Wisdom. In Adventure, teams made their way to Cultural Tourism Village. One team member had to operate an off-road vehicle while the other member held a cup of Sting Energy Drink in their palm. Teams had to drive through the marked route while preventing the liquid from spilling. If the amount of liquid left was higher than the line on the cup, teams would receive their next clue. Teams had two attempts to complete the task before taking a 30-minute penalty. In Wisdom, teams traveled to the Thay Pagoda, where they found five sets of tangram puzzle pieces with numbers. Teams had to solve the puzzles and convert the numbers to letters (with 1=A, 2=B, etc.) and form words. When they stated the correct sentence (Vietnamese: bật năng lượng bứt phá, lit. Turn on the Energy), they would receive the next clue.

In this leg's Roadblock, one team member had to pick up shoe shining supplies at the intersection of Tạ Hiện & Lương Ngọc Quyến, shine five pairs of shoes, and earn at least 1,000,000₫ to receive their next clue. The team member who chose to perform the Roadblock could not speak, so their partner had to encourage people to have their shoes shined.

Additional tasks

- At Vincom Mega Mall Royal City, one team member had to sit on seal seat while their partner pushed them across the ice rink through a pair of Amazing Race flags. The team member on the seal had to slide through a second pair of flags to receive their next clue. If teams were unable to complete the task after two attempts, they had to wait 15 minutes before trying again.
- At Temple of Confucius, teams watched a cờ tướng match played by two locals. Teams had to remember the chess pieces moved and bring people with the same colors and symbols as the pieces used to a human-sized chessboard. If they could recreate the moves with humans, they would receive their next clue.

=== Leg 5 (Hanoi → Laos) ===
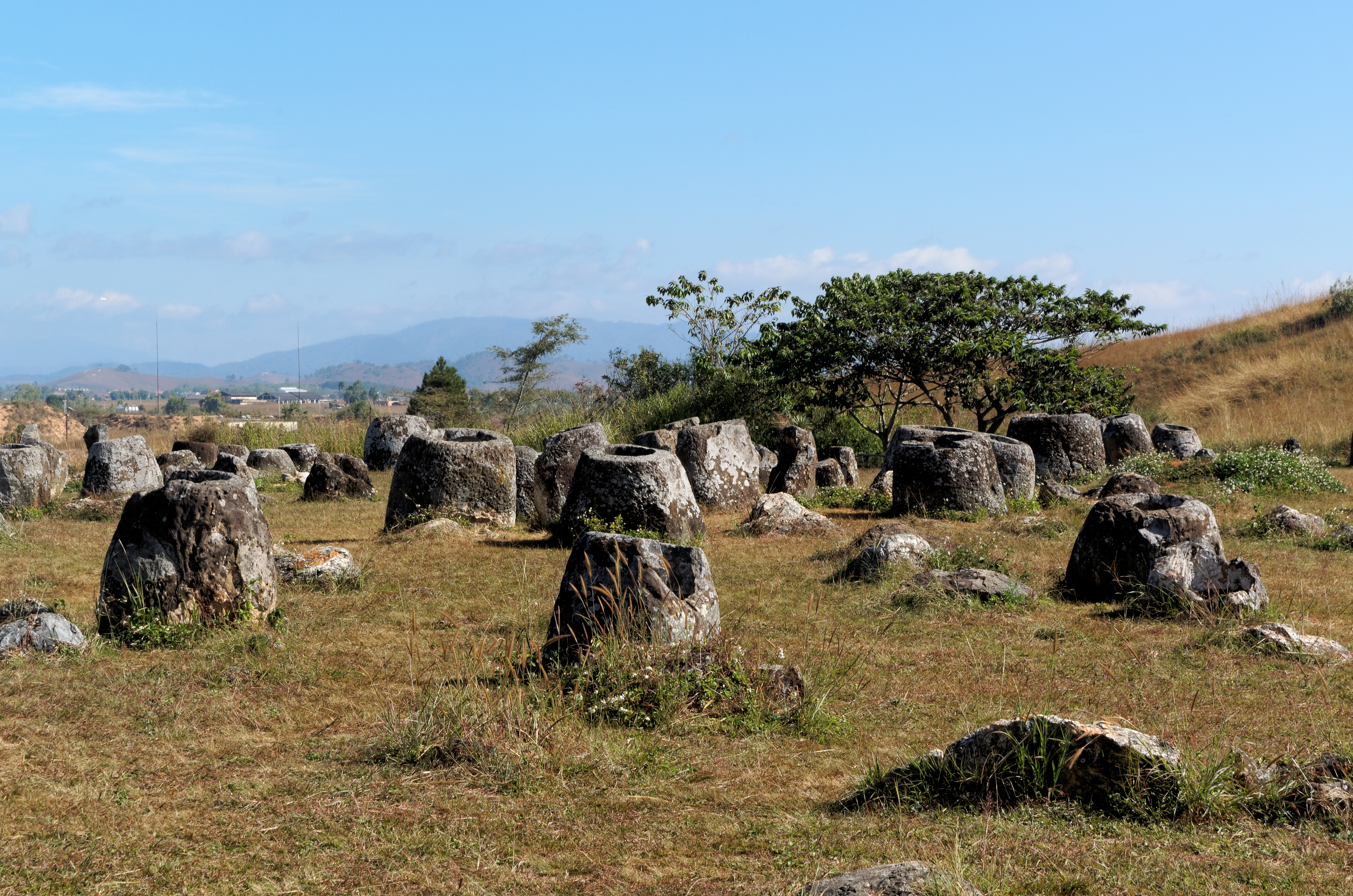
Teams concluded their leg in Laos at the Plain of Jars on the Xiangkhoang Plateau.

Airdate: 14 August 2015

- Hanoi (Noi Bai International Airport) to Luang Prabang, Laos (Luang Prabang International Airport)
- Luang Prabang (Wat Xieng Thong)
- Ban Muang Khai (Luang Prabang Elephant Camp)
- Luang Prabang (Luang Prabang Night Market) (Overnight Rest)
- Luang Prabang (Phou Si)
- Luang Prabang Province (Ban Chan Pottery Village or Ban Xang Khong)
- Xiangkhoang Plateau (Plain of Jars)

In this leg's Roadblock, one team member had to search the mountain of Phou Si and take pictures of seven different Buddha Statues that represented the Seven Days of the Week on a smartphone to receive their next clue.

This leg's Detour was a choice between Soil or Paper. In Soil, teams had to make their way to Ban Chan Pottery Village and carve out decorative holes into an unbaked pot following an example to receive their next clue. If teams made a mistake, they had to fill a jar with water from the Mekong River and bring it back to the workshop before they could start over. In Paper, teams had to make their way to Ban Xang Khong and arrange flowers, leaves, and pulp on a screen to make five sheets of saa paper to the satisfaction of the papermaker to receive their next clue. If their work was not approved, one team member had to hold their partner by their legs and walk two laps around the paper drying station as a human wheelbarrow before they could to continue the task.

Additional tasks

- Upon arrival in Laos, teams had to find one of five women wearing traditional clothing inside the airport and say "Hello. Please give me a clue." in Lao. When they found the correct woman, the clue teams received instructed them to take a songthaew to Wat Xieng Thong and search the grounds for their next clue.
- At Luang Prabang Elephant Camp, teams had to feed bamboo pieces to an Asian elephant and then ride on the elephant to observe fifteen pictures of Laotian flowers, which each had a letter from A to C and a number from one to five. When their ride ended, teams had two minutes to sort five flowers from one letter group with their numbers to receive their next clue, otherwise they had to wash their elephant before they would be given their next clue.
- At Luang Prabang Night Market, teams had to search for a stall selling the fabric depicted on the picture in their clue and buy that fabric. Teams had ₭100,000 and had to earn at least 300,000 additional Kip without using their provided leg money to buy the fabric, which they could exchange for their next clue. Teams would resume the leg the next day based on the order they completed the task.
- At the Plain of Jars, teams had to search for their next clue hidden in the jars. The clue instructed teams to make their way to a marked plain. There, one team member had to toss water to their partner, who was holding a jar. They then had to pour the water from the jar to fill three bowls and receive their next clue directing them to the Pit Stop.

=== Leg 6 (Laos → Nghệ An) ===
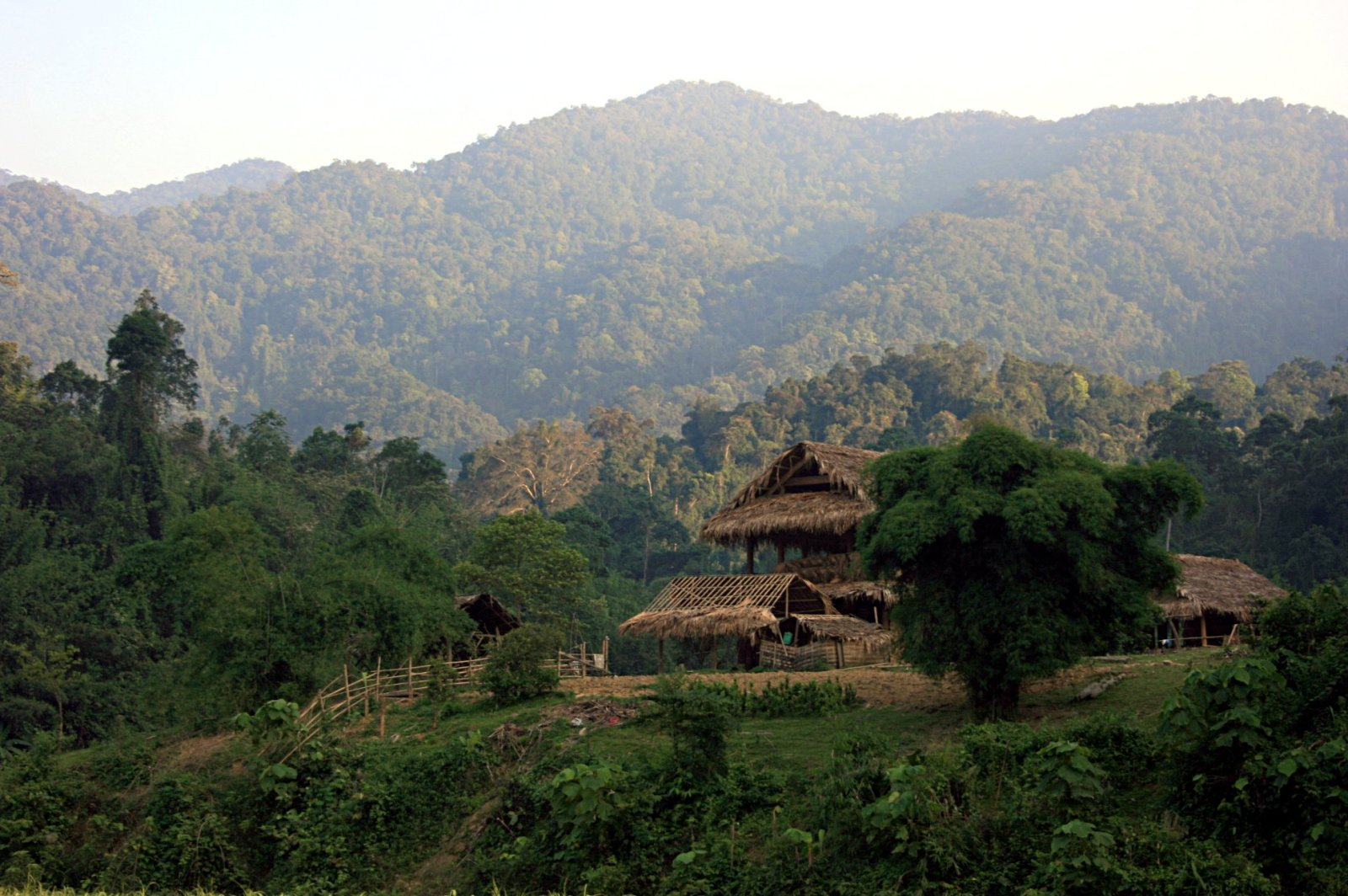
Teams began their leg in Nghệ An Province at Pù Mát National Park.

Airdate: 21 August 2015

- Pù Mát National Park, Nghệ An Province, Vietnam (Bản Trung Chính) (Pit Start)
- Pù Mát National Park (Khe Kèm Falls) (Overnight Rest)
- Trù Sơn (Mr. Thoang's House to Hội Thiệm Temple)
- Vinh (Quang Trung Temple)
- Vinh (Ho Chi Minh Square (in Vietnamese))

In this leg's Roadblock, one team member had to use a mechanical ascender to scale Khe Kèm Falls and rappel down to receive their next clue. Teams would resume the leg the next day based on the order they finished the task.

Additional tasks

- At Bản Trung Chính within Pù Mát National Park, one team member would be blindfolded and had to catch a live eel from a mud pit and place it in a basket following the guidance from their partner to receive their next clue.
- At Mr. Thoang's House, teams hd to fill two baskets attached to a bicycle with clay pots and transport them to Hội Thiệm Temple. When they delivered all the pots, they would receive their next clue. Otherwise, they would incur a two-minute penalty per each pot broken along the way.
- At Quang Trung Temple, teams were given the first 28 words of the poem "Hỏi Trăng" written by poet Hồ Xuân Hương. They had to use the 28 words to create a new poem that adhered to poetry guidelines. They then would be given cards of the same 28 words written in Chinese calligraphy Teams had to arrange the Chinese characters in the same order as their poem to receive their next clue. Cards that translated the characters into Vietnamese were placed around the temple; however, teams could not take notes of the translations.

=== Leg 7 (Nghệ An → Quang Nam & Da Nang) ===
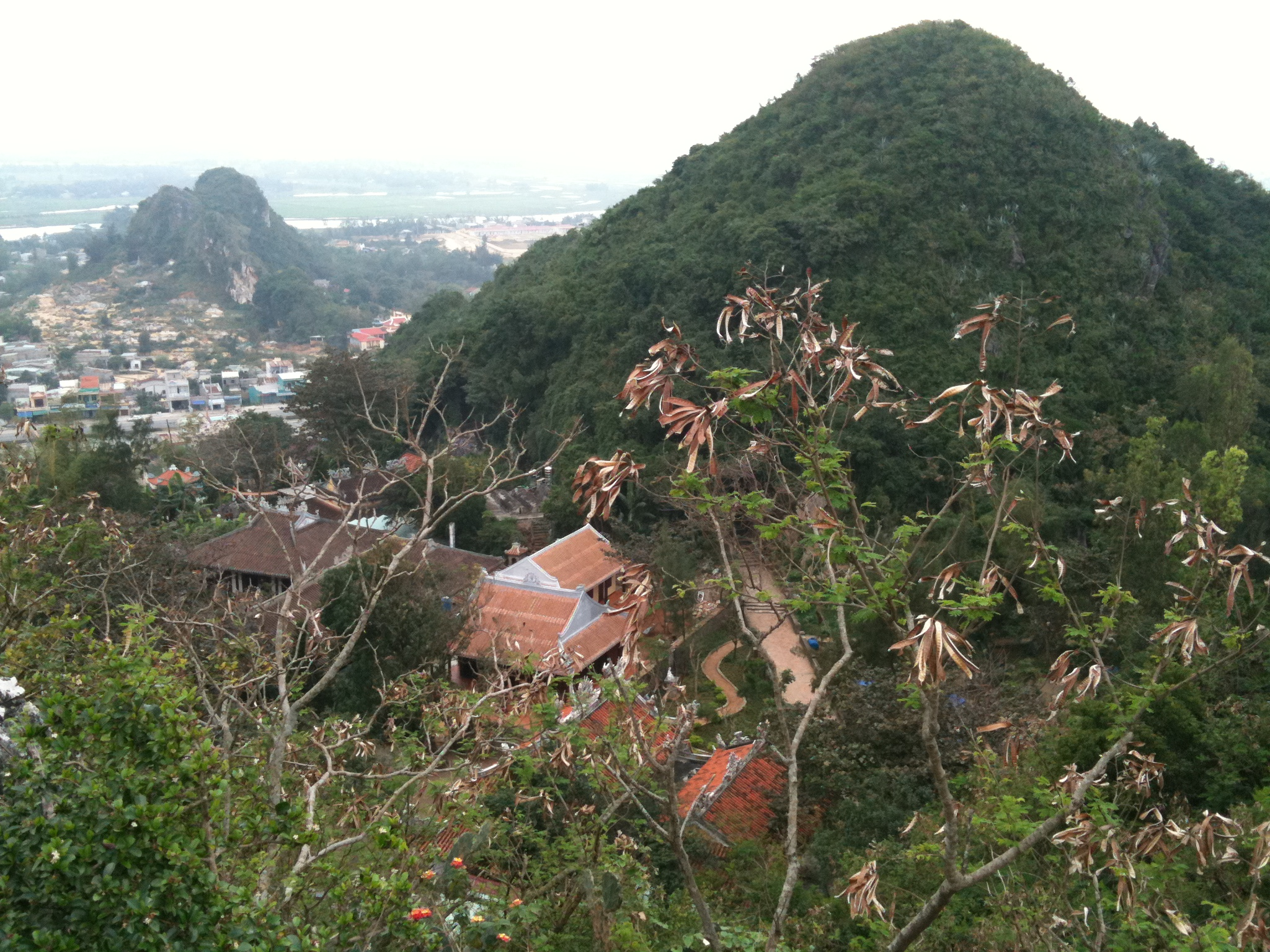
The Detour in Da Nang took place at the Marble Mountains.

Airdate: 28 August 2015

- Sơn Trà (Heritage Banyan Tree)
- Da Nang (InterContinental Danang Sun Peninsula Resort – L.O.N.G. Bar)
- Da Nang (InterContinental Danang Sun Peninsula Resort – North Beach)
- Da Nang (Marble Mountains)
- Hội An, Quang Nam Province (Cau Chua Pagoda)
- Da Nang (Asia Park)

In this leg's Roadblock, one team member had to carry a tray with two glasses of Sting Energy Drink using only one hand to two beachgoers, swap their glasses for the beachgoers' glasses, and bring the beachgoers' glasses back to the drink station. They would then have to repeat this process with three glasses and then four glasses. When all the drinks were served, teams would receive their next clue. This task was first come, first served, so if team members dropped a glass or made a mistake, they would have to go to the back of any formed line and wait for their next attempt.

This leg's Detour was a choice between Water or Earth. In Water, teams made their way to Am Phu Caves. There, teams would find a tank full of water and two empty tanks. Teams had to transfer the water so that each tank had the amount of water listed to receive their next clue. If teams made a mistake, they would incur a 15-minute penalty before they could restart the task. In Earth, teams made their way to the Huynh Cong Manh Huyen Tran Stone Production facility. There, teams had to carry a stone mortar filled with water up a set of stairs to Tam Thai Pagoda. Along the way, teams had to count the number of steps while trying not spill the water in the mortar passed a line. When they reach the pagoda with the minimum amount of water, teams provide the number of steps they counted. If teams gave the correct answer, they would receive the next clue. If they spilled too much water or gave an incorrect number, they would incur a 25-minute penalty and would have to recount the steps without the mortar.

Additional tasks

- At Heritage Banyan Tree, teams had to search the 800-year-old Banyan tree and find one of 60 envelopes hanging on the tree that contained their next clue. The remaining envelopes contained instructions like act like monkeys, form a heart with your arms, hop on one foot, or give your partner a piggyback ride, which teams had to complete before they could pick another envelope.
- At L.O.N.G. Bar, teams would be taught how to properly make two cocktails, a Lotus cocktail and a Bourbon Bergamot cocktail, and then had to properly make the cocktails to the satisfaction of the bartenders to receive their next clue.
- At Cau Chua Pagoda, teams had to sell 60 animal flutes at 30,000₫ per flute to receive their next clue from the shopkeeper. Teams were not allowed to speak verbally while performing the task, and each customer could not buy more than two flutes.

=== Leg 8 (Da Nang → Quảng Ngãi) ===
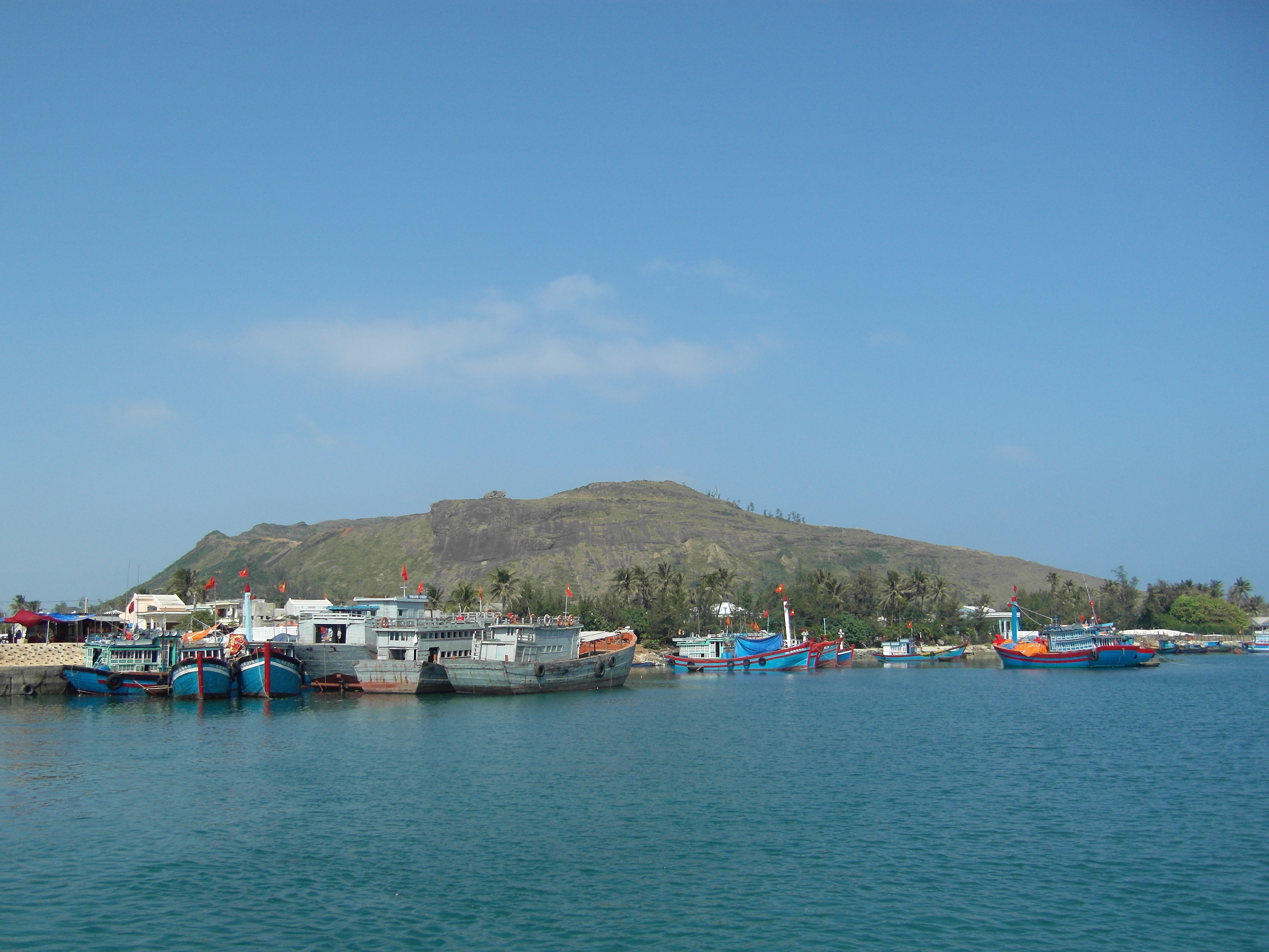
Teams visited the island of Lý Sơn while in Quảng Ngãi Province.

Airdate: 4 September 2015

- Da Nang (Đà Nẵng Railway Station) to Quảng Ngãi, Quảng Ngãi Province (Quảng Ngãi Railway Station)
- Sa Kỳ (Sa Kỳ Pier) to Lý Sơn (Lý Sơn Pier)
- Lý Sơn (Thoi Loi Mountain)
- Lý Sơn (Thoi Loi Reservoir)
- Lý Sơn (Cô Phường's House or Hang Câu Beach)
- Lý Sơn (Lý Sơn Pier) to Little Island [Đảo Bé] (Pier)
- Little Island (Vượt Rào)
- Little Island (Hòn Đụn)
- Little Island (Hang Cò Stone Wall)

This leg's Detour was a choice between Process or Catch. In Process, teams will have to drive their car to Cô Phường's House. There, teams had to properly make 30 Bánh ít lá gai to receive their next clue. In Catch, teams made their way to Hang Câu Beach and had to catch 10 sea urchins to receive their next clue from a fisherman.

In this leg's Roadblock, one team member had to walk on stilts across a sandy field until they crossed a line. If they fell off, they would incur a 10-minute penalty before they could try again and could practice with the stilts. Then, they had to kick a flaming coconut at three pumice rock towers and knock down one tower to receive their next clue. If they missed, they would have to start the task from the beginning.

Additional tasks

- After arriving at Lý Sơn, teams had to ride a marked tuk-tuk to Thoi Loi Mountain. There, teams had to pull a cart with a barrel up the mountain to Thoi Loi Reservoir. Once there, teams had to use a bucket attached to a rope to draw water out of the reservoir and fill their barrel to a line. When the barrel was full, teams had to bring it back down the mountain to receive their next clue.
- After arriving on Little Island, teams had to strap their feet to a pair of boards and walk to the Roadblock location.
- Teams walk continue to Hòn Đụn by walking on their boards. Once there, teams had to thread garlic and onions onto metal wire and attach the wire to a turtle-shaped basket as to create a shell. If their turtle matched the example, teams would receive their next clue

=== Leg 9 (Quảng Ngãi → Khanh Hoa) ===
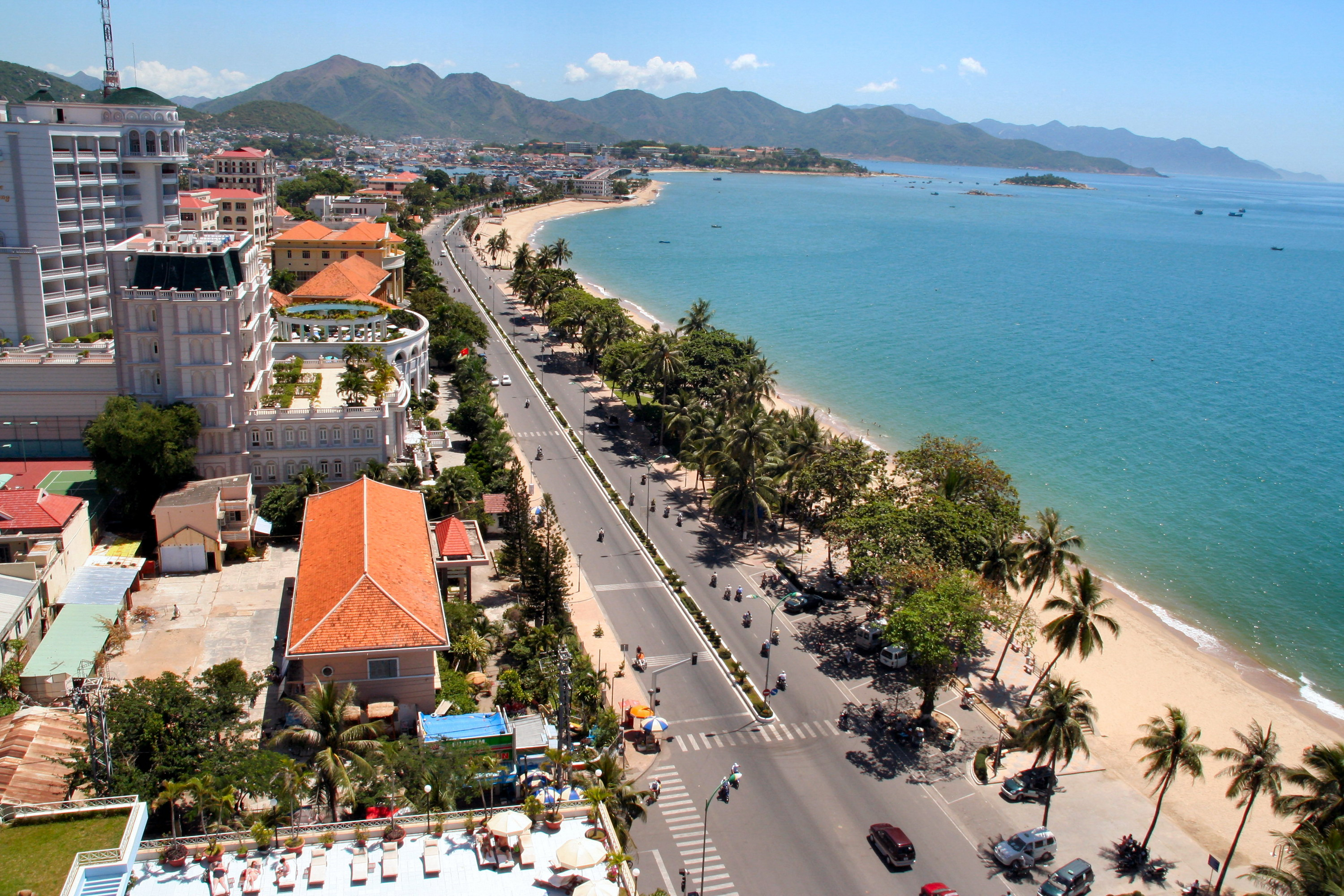
One Detour option in Khanh Hoa Province took place at the beaches of Nha Trang.

Airdate: 11 September 2015

- Little Island (Pier) to Sa Kỳ (Sa Kỳ Pier)
- Quảng Ngãi (Quảng Ngãi Railway Station) to Nha Trang, Khanh Hoa Province (Nha Trang Railway Station)
- Cát Lợi (Long Phú Pier) to Monkey Island (Đảo Khỉ Pier)
- Monkey Island (Sơn Hầu Vương)
- Monkey Island (Đảo Khỉ Pier) to Cát Lợi (Long Phú Pier)
- Nha Trang (Bảo Đại Pier) to Hòn Tằm (Hòn Tằm Pier)
- Hòn Tằm (Sea Walker)
- Hòn Tằm (MerPerle Hòn Tằm Resort)
- Hòn Tằm (Hòn Tằm Pier) to Nha Trang (Bảo Đại Pier)
- Nha Trang (Trần Phú Street Beach or Po Nagar)
- Nha Trang (Hòn Chồng Tourist Site (in Vietnamese))

In this leg's Roadblock, one team member had to operate a Jetovator, a hyrdoflight bike, and perform three dives in and out of the water. Only one team could perform this task at a time, so if team members could not complete the task within a specified time limit, they would have to go to the back of any formed line. When they completed the task, a drone would deliver teams their next clue.

This leg's Detour was a choice between Sand or Drum. In Sand, teams made their way to Trần Phú Street Beach. There, they had to build a sand sculpture that matched a built example to receive their next clue. In Drum, teams made their way to Po Nagar. There, teams had to memorize and then perform three drum sequences correctly to receive their next clue. If teams made a mistake, they had to serve a 10-minute penalty before they could make another attempt.

Additional tasks

- At Monkey Island, teams had to wear nets covered with fruits to allow the island's macaques to approach them. They then had to give the macaques a coconut and had to wait until one opened it to reveal a key. When the key was out of the coconut, teams would receive their next clue.
- At Sea Walker, each team member had to choose a key and don a diving helmet. Each team member had to find a box that their key unlock and had to solve the math problem inside the box. Each team member had to non-verbally communicate their answer to their partner, and if team members returned to the surface with the correct sum, they would receive their next clue. If they gave a wrong answer, teams would incur a 15-minute penalty before they could retry.

=== Leg 10 (Khanh Hoa → Lâm Đồng) ===
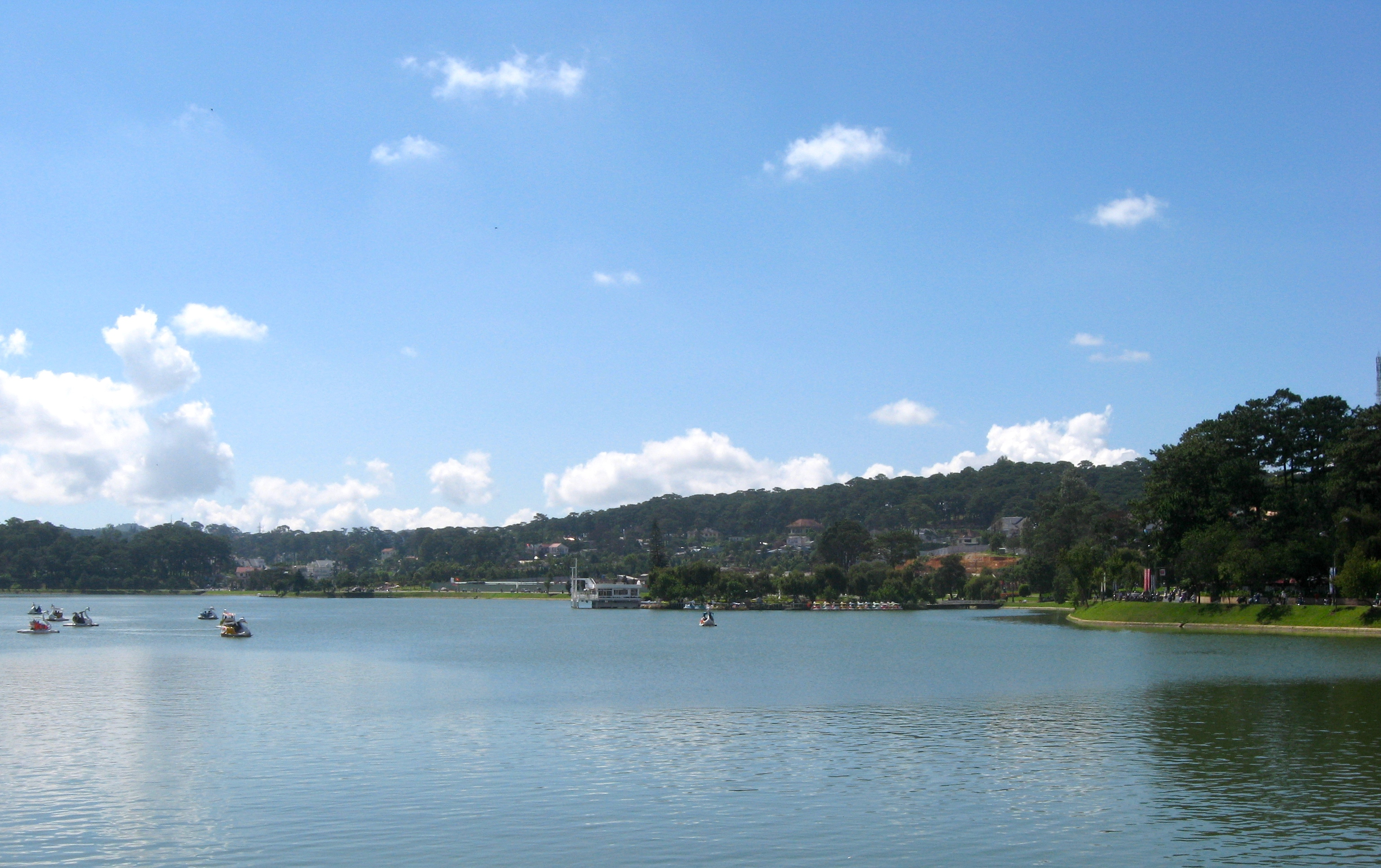
In Da Lat, teams encountered the season's only Fast Forward, which required them to pull a carriage around Xuan Huong Lake.

Airdate: 18 September 2015

- Nha Trang (Nha Trang Southern Bus Terminal) to Da Lat, Lâm Đồng Province (Da Lat Interprovincial Bus Terminal)
- Da Lat (Than Tho Lake) (Overnight Rest)
- Da Lat (Tran Phu High School)
- Da Lat (Than Tho Lake)
  - Da Lat (Xuan Huong Lake)
- Da Lat (Dalat Palace Golf Club)
- Da Lat (Datanla Falls (in Vietnamese))
- Da Lat (Cù Lần Village)

In this season's only Fast Forward, one team had to pull a horse-drawn carriage around Xuan Huong Lake. At the intersection of Đinh Tiên Hoàng and Trần Quốc Toản, teams would find a carriage and had to convince two locals to ride in it. One team member would to pull the carriage while the other would ride in the carriage with the locals and serve as a tour guide. Team members could switch roles at any time, and the team member serving as a tour guide could help push the carriage uphill at specified points. When they completed one lap around the lake with the two locals, they would win the Fast Forward award.

In this season's final Roadblock, the team member that did not choose to participate would be asked a series of questions. The team member performing the Roadblock would be asked the same questions and had to match their answers with their partner's. Each time they answered incorrectly, their partner had to jump off a ledge near Datanla Falls into a pool of water. Once they answered all the questions correctly, they would receive their next clue.

Additional tasks

- At Than Tho Lake, teams had to set up a tent for the night. They would get their next clue in the same order that they finished assembling the tent after they were awoken in the middle of the night.
- At the Tran Phu High School, teams had to search the school in pitch black darkness for their next clue and a briefcase, which contained 130 million₫. If teams were unable to find both items in a specified time limit, they would have to serve a 15-minute penalty before they could search one more time. When both were found, teams had to make their way out of the school and find host Phan Anh, who would offer teams a choice of their next clue or the money in the briefcase. If teams accepted the briefcase, they would have to withdraw from the competition immediately. If teams accepted their next clue, they would return to their tent and would resume racing in the morning.
- At the Dalat Palace Golf Club, one team member had to ride in the Zorb while their partner pushed the Zorb down a hill in order to hit 6 stacks of barrels arranged like bowling pins. After each attempt, both team members had to push to Zorb back to the starting point. Once teams knocked down a combined total of six pins, they would receive their next clue.
- At Datanla Falls, teams had to hike down a steep path to reach the top of the waterfall and obtain their next clue.
- At Cù Lần Village, teams, with the exception of the Fast Forward winners, had to cross a series of floating platforms across a lake to reach the Pit Stop.

=== Leg 11 (Lâm Đồng → Tây Ninh → Ho Chi Minh City) ===
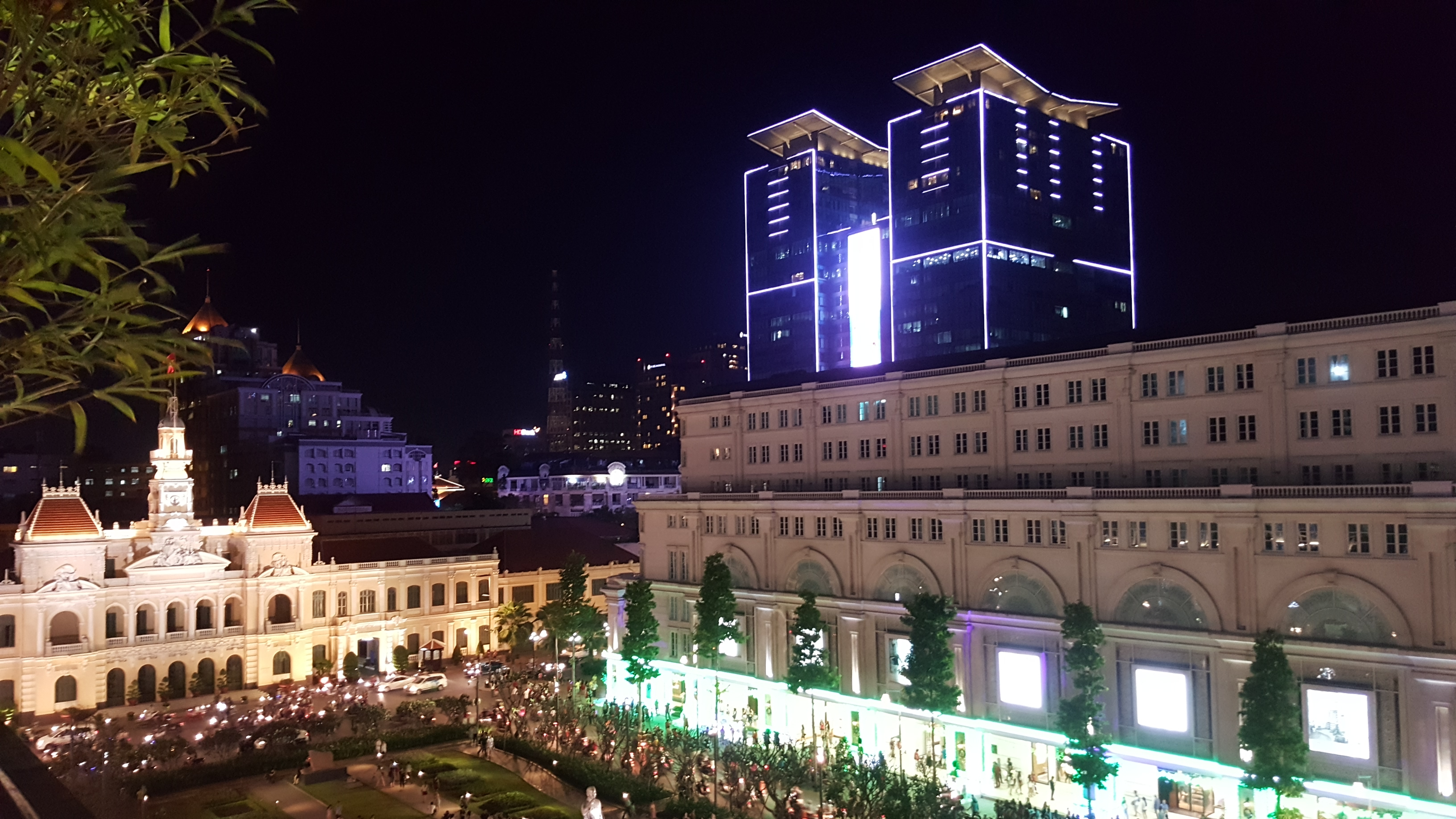
Teams crossed the Finish Line at Nguyen Hue Pedestrian Walkway near Ho Chi Minh City Hall.

Airdate: 25 September 2015

- Tây Ninh, Tây Ninh Province (41 Trần Văn Trà)
- Tây Ninh (Tây Ninh Stadium (in Vietnamese))
- Tây Ninh (Farm)
- Ho Chi Minh City (331 Bến Vân Đồn)
- Ho Chi Minh City (Thủ Thiêm Tunnel Park or Phú Mỹ Bridge)
- Ho Chi Minh City (Phim Truong Long Island (in Vietnamese))
- Ho Chi Minh City (Nguyễn Huệ Pedestrian Walkway)

This season's final Detour was a choice between Dance or Technical. In Dance, teams made their way to Thủ Thiêm Tunnel. Teams would watch a popping dance by local dancers and Vietnam's Got Talent contestants Nhóm Nhảy Ngẩu Hứng. After learning the dance from two of the dancers, teams had to correctly perform the dance in sync with three dancers to receive their next clue. In Technical, team made their way to Phú Mỹ Bridge. There, teams had to remove three tires from a semi-trailer truck and roll them down a road until they found new tires. Teams would then roll the new tires to the truck and attach them to the wheel to receive their next clue.

Additional tasks

- At 41 Trần Văn Trà, teams had to board a truck that was loaded with a pallet of Sting Energy Drink boxes and travel to Tây Ninh Stadium.
- At Tây Ninh Stadium, teams had to choose one of three slips of paper that had the letters "Đ", "K", and "T" written on them. Teams then had to unload the boxes from their truck, bring their boxes to the centre circle, which had a "C" already made, and arrange their boxes to form their letter. When complete, the letters would form the initials of the show. When teams completed their letter, they would receive their next clue.
- At the farm, one team member would be blindfolded and had to catch one of two ducks from a pen following directions from their partner. The pen was trisected with string with bells attached. If they touched the string, they had to serve a 10-minute penalty. When they caught the duck, they would receive their next clue.
- At Phim Truong Long Island, teams had to use two poles to move themselves and a heavy barrel over a long pole suspended over a pool of water. Once across, teams would have to repeat the process and go back across to the starting point to receive their next clue. If teams or the barrel touched the water or if teams went outside the two white lines on the pole they were crossing, they would have to restart the crossing they were attempting.
- After crossing the pole, one team member scale a ladder up a wall and retrieve four puzzle pieces that depicted the route of the season. Once all pieces were brought down, teams had to remove stickers with the Amazing Race logo to reveal the distances traveled between each leg. Teams then had to mentally calculate the total distance traveled over 11 legs. If they calculated a distance of 3,613 kilometres (2,245 mi), a drone would deliver teams their final clue.
