= Lam Vien Square =

Coordinates: 11°56′19.5″N 108°26′40.3″E

- Dalat Central Square (Quảng trường Trung tâm Đà Lạt)
- Quảng trường Lâm Viên
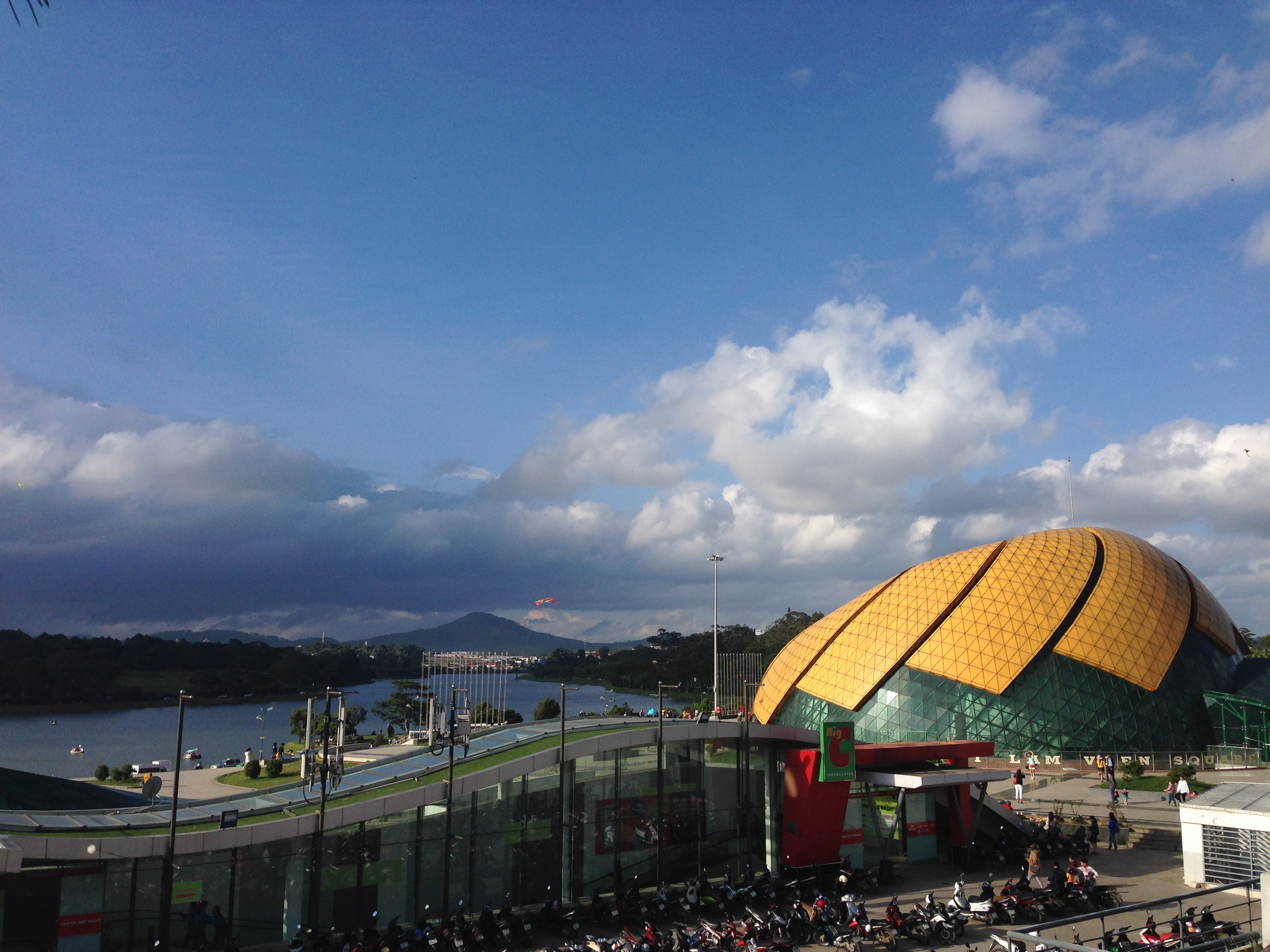
- Overview of Lâm Viên Square, including the Opera House, BigC Dalat Supermarket (now is Go!) with Xuân Hương Lake and Langbiang Mount in the background
- Interactive map of Lam Vien Square
- Type: Public
- Location: Xuân Hương, Đà Lạt, Lâm Đồng Province
- Area: about 72,000 m²
- Opened: 2016
- Designer: Trần Văn Dũng

Lam Vien Square (Vietnamese: Quảng trường Lâm Viên) is the central square of the former city of Da Lat, Lâm Đồng Province. It has become one of Da Lat's most popular public spaces and a major venue for cultural and tourism events, including Dalat Flower Festival.

== Name ==
In its early days, the square was named Đà Lạt Central Square (Quảng trường Trung tâm Đà Lạt) and it still used as a colloquial name. On November 10, 2011, the People's Council of Đà Lạt City approved its official name as Lâm Viên Square. The name recalls Đà Lạt's location on the Lâm Viên Plateau as well as the former Lâm Viên province before merged with Đồng Nai Thượng province to become Lâm Đồng province.

== Location ==
Lam Vien Square is located on the southern side of Xuân Hương Lake, surrounded by Trần Quốc Toản Street.

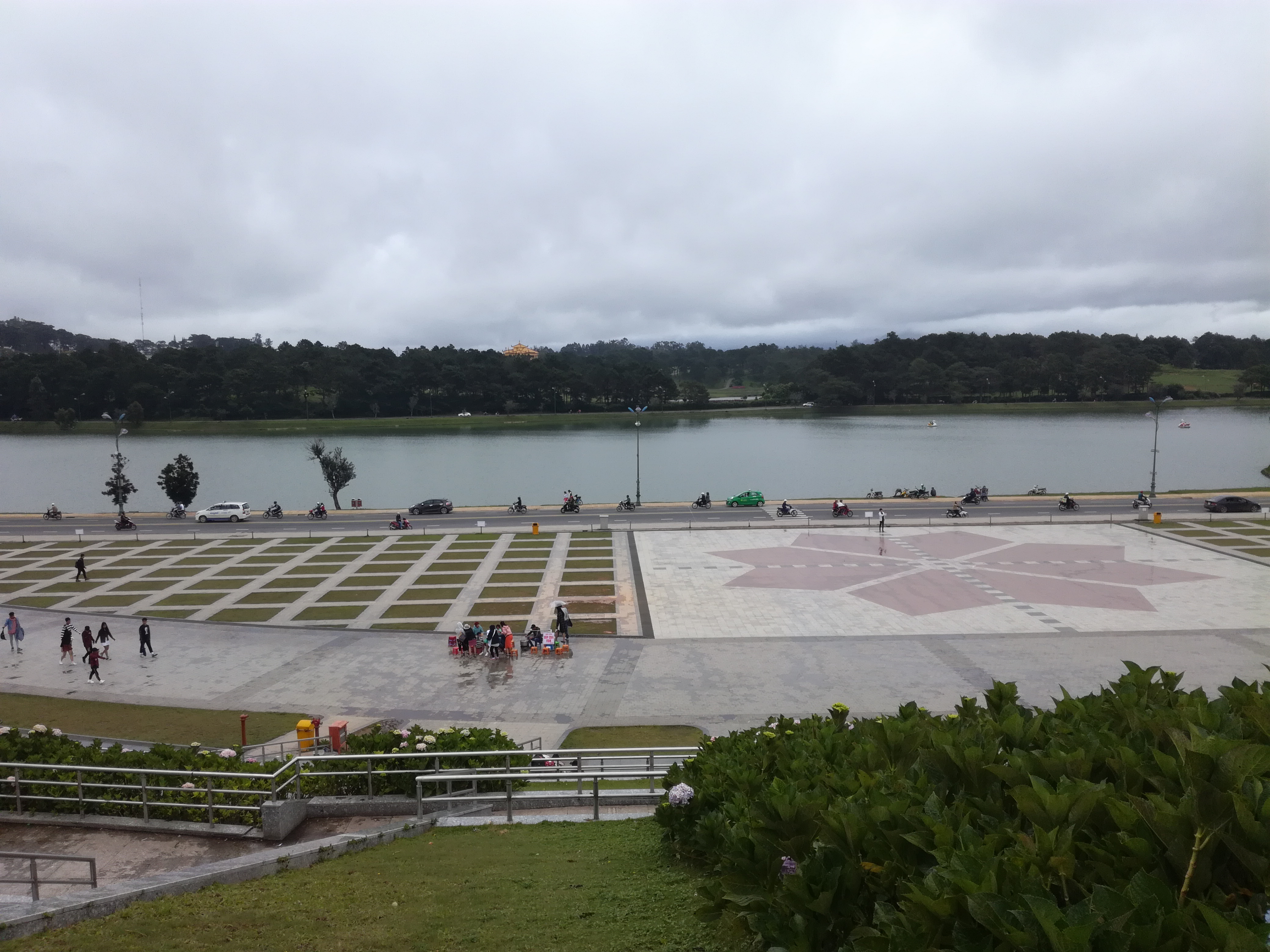
Xuân Hương Lake viewed from the square

== Architecture ==
This landmark was constructed with an impressive budget of 681 billion VND (nearly 30 million USD) and has the capacity to hold around 60,000 people. Covering more than 70,000 m², the square includes open plazas, gardens, fountains, underground parking, and recreational areas. The two iconic structures are:

- The "giant wild sunflower" Dalat Opera House, about 18 meters tall, built from green and yellow stained glass. Inside is a performance hall used for art shows and exhibitions.
- The "artichoke bud", about 15 meters tall, inspired by Da Lat's famous artichokes. It currently houses a café and serves as a tourist attraction.
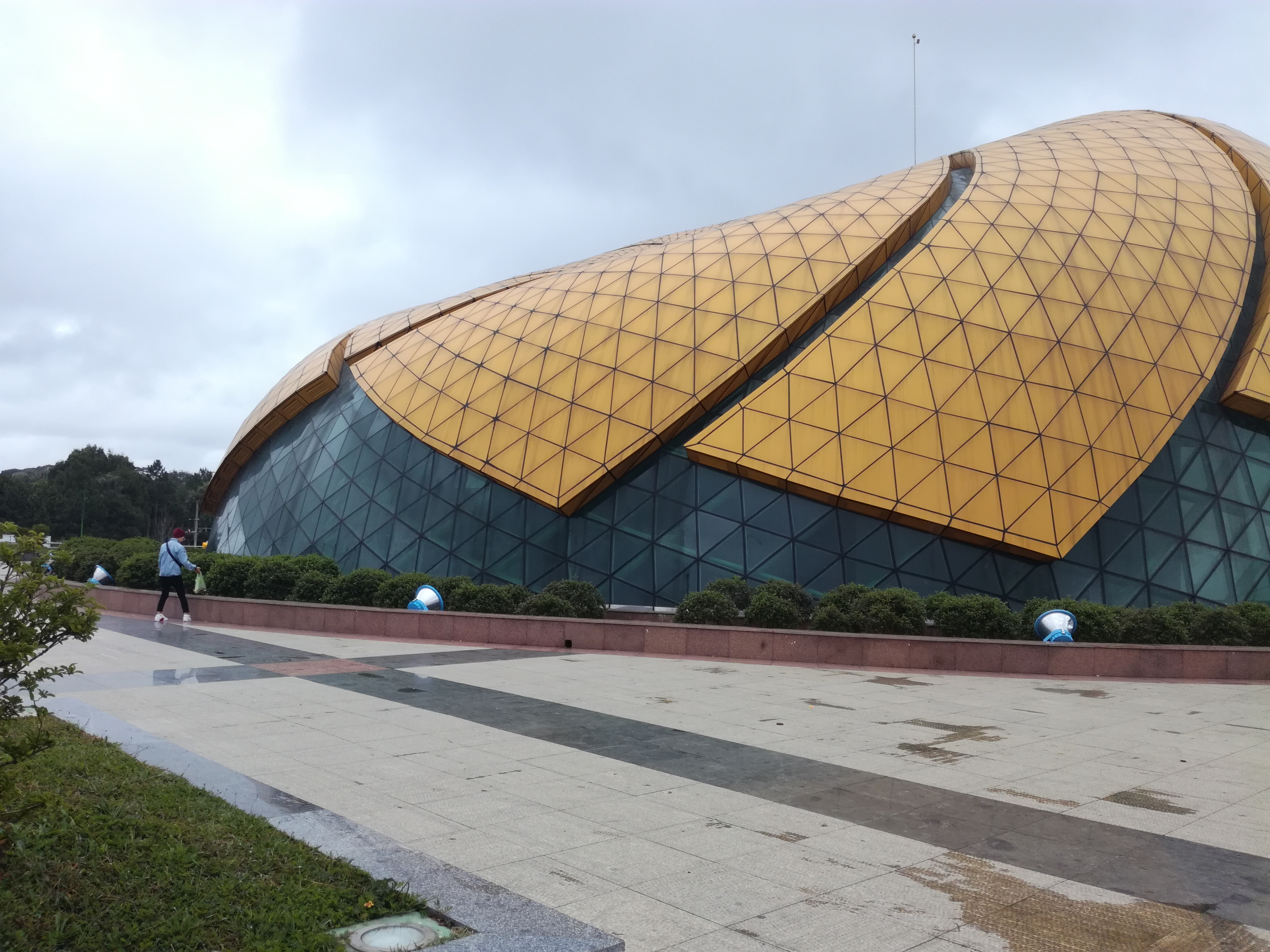
The giant wild sunflower Dalat Opera House

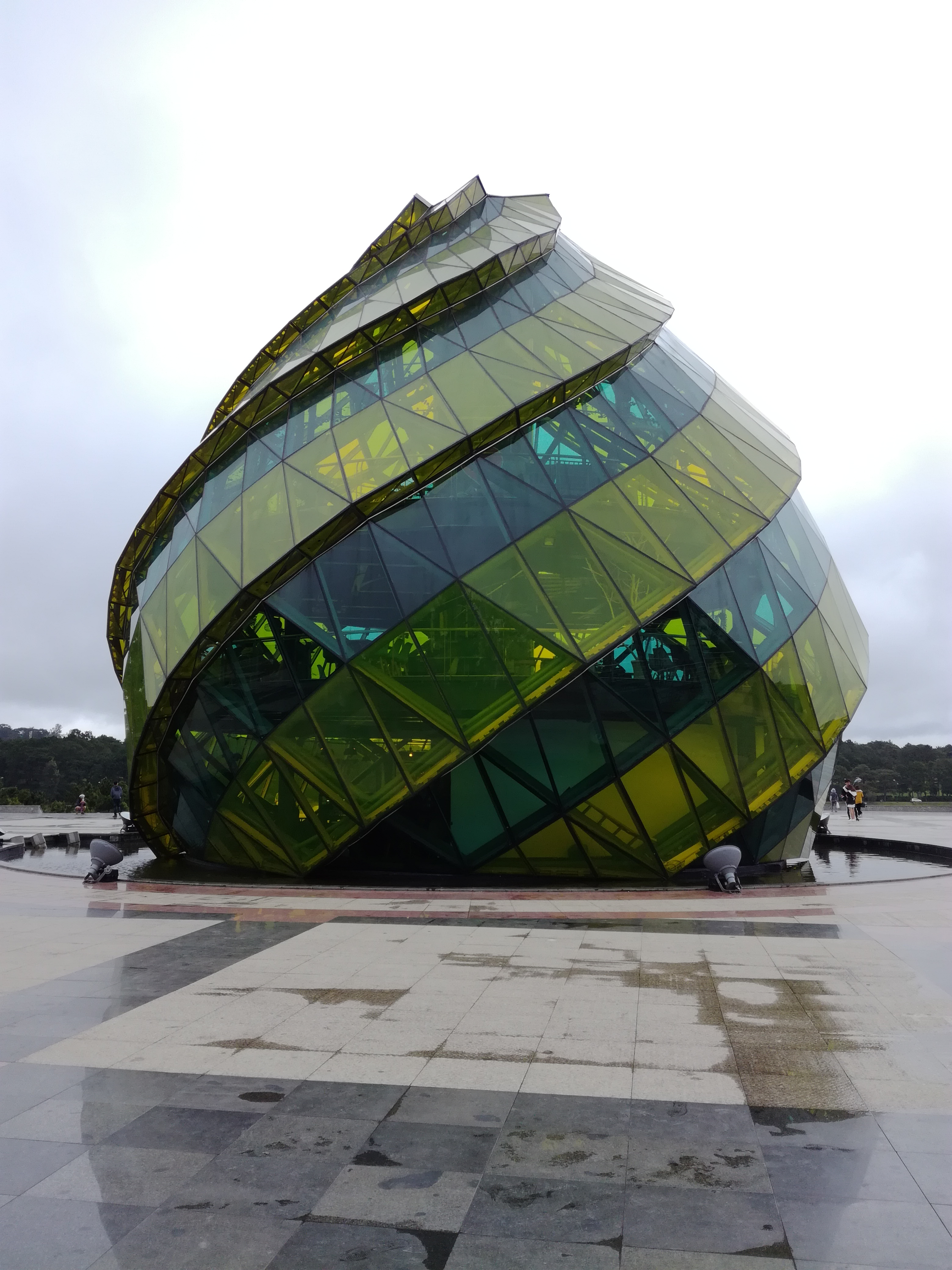
The Artichoke bud-shaped building

== Functions and activities ==
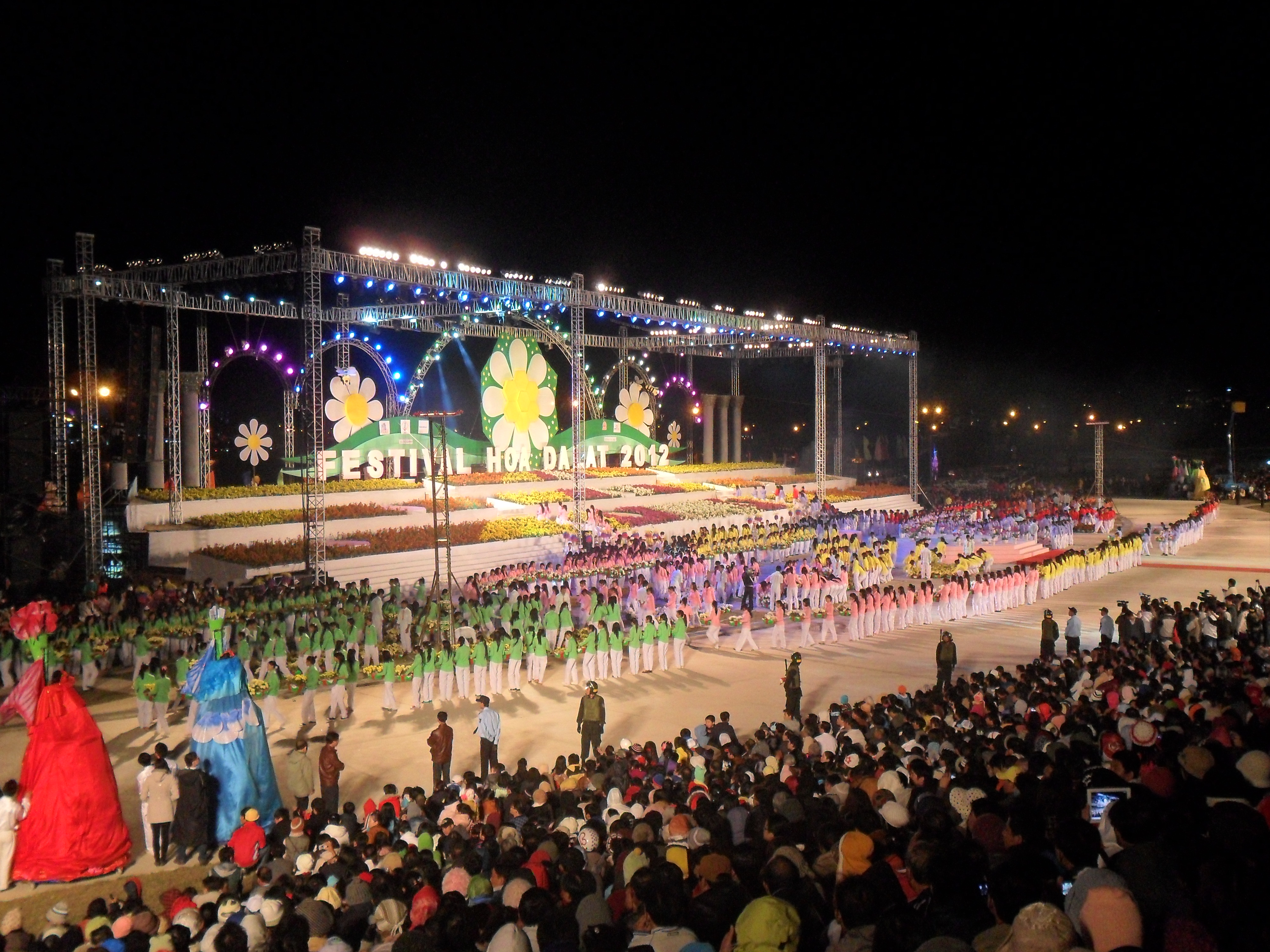
Opening night of Dalat Flower Festival 2012 at Lâm Viên Square.

Lam Vien Square serves multiple roles as:

- A community gathering space for residents.
- A venue for official celebrations, festivals, and cultural performances.
- A popular tourist destination for sightseeing and photography.
