= Hồ Xuân Hương (disambiguation) =

Hồ Xuân Hương may refer to:

- Xuân Hương Lake, lake in Da Lat, Vietnam
- Hồ Xuân Hương, Vietnamese poet
