= APEC Vietnam 2017 =

Economic meeting in Vietnam

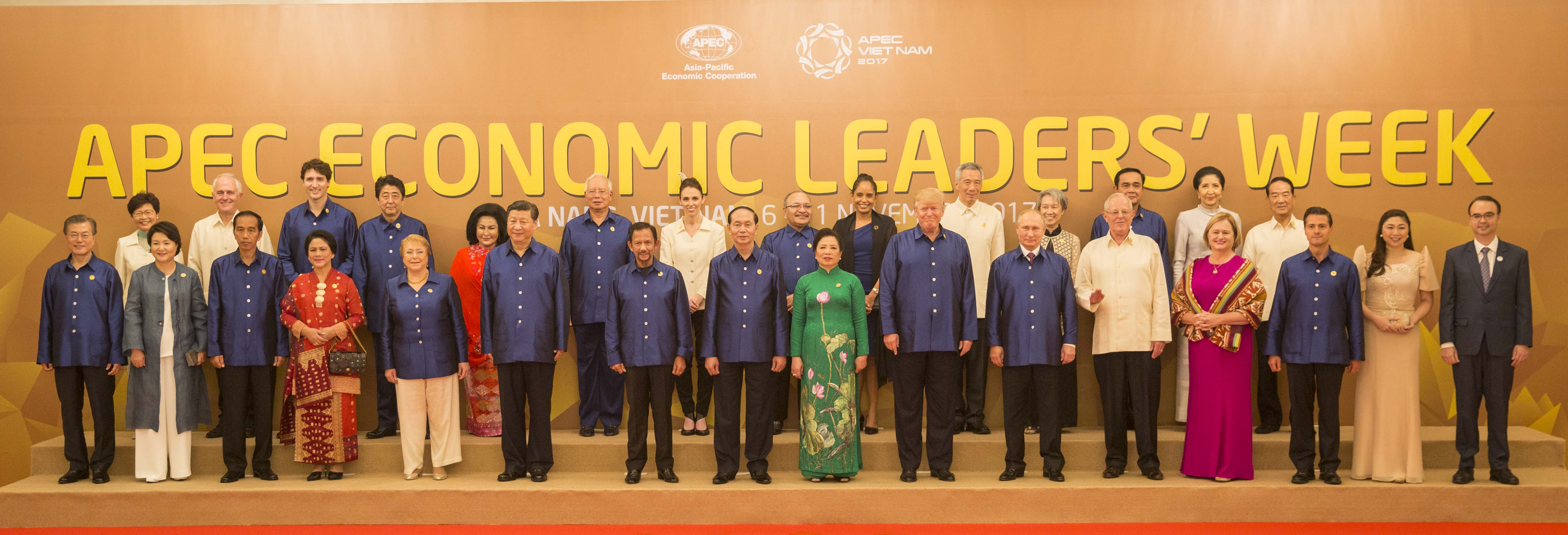
- APEC Vietnam 2017 delegates
- Host country: Vietnam
- Date: 10–11 November
- Motto: Creating New Dynamism, Fostering a Shared Future (Vietnamese: Tạo động lực mới, cùng vun đắp tương lai chung)
- Venues: Main venue InterContinental Danang Sun Peninsula Resort, Da Nang Other meetings 10 host locations: Cần Thơ; Danang; Hạ Long; Hanoi; Ho Chi Minh City; Hội An; Hue; Nha Trang; Ninh Bình; Vinh
- Follows: APEC Peru 2016
- Precedes: APEC Papua New Guinea 2018
- Website: apec2017.vn (archived)

APEC Vietnam 2017 (Vietnamese: APEC Việt Nam 2017) was the year-long hosting of Asia-Pacific Economic Cooperation (APEC) meetings in Vietnam, which culminated with the APEC Economic Leaders' Meeting in Da Nang, hosted at InterContinental Danang Sun Peninsula Resort. It marked the second time Vietnam played host to the APEC, having hosted the event previously in 2006 in Hanoi.

== Branding ==
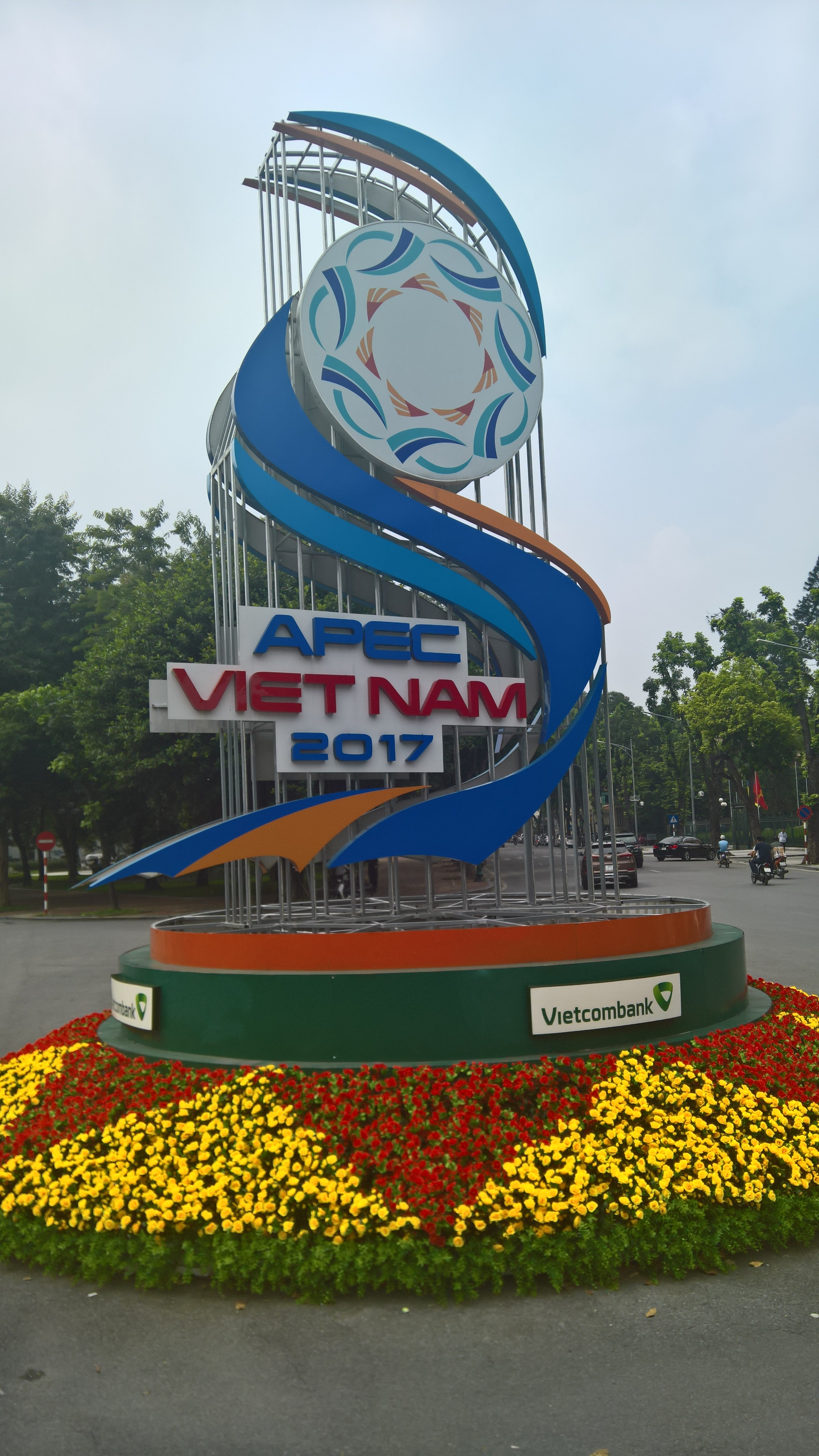
Structure featuring the logo of the summit.

The Vietnamese Ministry of Culture, Sports and Tourism and the National Committee for APEC 2017 through the Agency for Fine Arts, Photography and Exhibition organized a logo design contest for the APEC Vietnam 2017 summit. The contest ran from March to April 4, 2016 and was open to both amateur and professional Vietnamese artists. The organizers of the logo design contests required the entries to feature the phrase "APEC Vietnam 2017", highlight Vietnamese culture, as well as to represent the five components of the 2017 summit which are dynamism, creativity, action, unity, and movement to the future. 234 submissions from 92 candidates residing in 20 provinces and cities across Vietnam for the competition were received by the ministry.

The winning logo design was announced in January 2017. The selected design was conceptualized by a group working for Mark&B Vietnam, a branding agency. The winning logo depicts stylised images of paddles and Lạc birds, a common motif on drums of the ancient Đông Sơn culture. The placement of the elements suggest a circular movement which is meant to represent a "dynamic APEC".

== Preparation ==
A Round Table Meeting with the theme, "Stronger Joint Action for APEC's Shared Vision", was held in Hanoi on December 17, 2015 by the Vietnamese Ministry of Foreign Affairs to discuss preparation efforts for the 2017 APEC Summit.

During the 4th National Committee for APEC 2017 on April 13, 2016 in Hanoi, Deputy Prime Minister, Minister of Foreign Affairs of Vietnam Pham Binh Minh directed ministries and agencies to coordinate with other APEC member states especially Peru and Papua New Guinea, the hosts of the 2016 and 2018 summits respectively.

The People's Committee of Da Nang, the host city of the Economic Leader's Meeting, approved a project to upgrade major roads in the city for the occasion in March 2016. The project covered 34 streets in the city, with an estimated cost of around ₫243 billion or US$10.9 million. The construction of the international passenger terminal at Da Nang International Airport was done in March 2017.

== Events ==
=== Economic Leaders' Meeting ===
==== Attendees ====
This was the first APEC meeting for United States president Donald Trump, South Korean president Moon Jae-in, Hong Kong chief executive Carrie Lam, and New Zealand prime minister Jacinda Ardern, since their inaugurations on 20 January 2017, 10 May 2017, 1 July 2017 and 26 October 2017, respectively. It was also the last APEC meeting for Chilean president Michelle Bachelet, Peruvian president Pedro Pablo Kuczynski, Malaysian prime minister Najib Razak, Australian prime minister Malcolm Turnbull, Mexican president Enrique Peña Nieto, and for the host, Vietnamese president Trần Đại Quang, following the 2017 Chilean general election, Kuczynski's resignation, the 2018 Malaysian general election, the 2018 Australian leadership spill, the 2018 Mexican general election and Quang's death, respectively.

Attendees at the 2017 APEC Economic Leaders' Meeting
Member economy	Name as used in APEC	Position	Name
Australia	Australia	Prime Minister	Malcolm Turnbull
Brunei	Brunei Darussalam	Sultan	Hassanal Bolkiah
Canada	Canada	Prime Minister	Justin Trudeau
Cambodia (invited guest)	Cambodia	Prime Minister	Hun Sen
Chile	Chile	President	Michelle Bachelet
China	People's Republic of China	President (Note: The president of China is legally a ceremonial representative with no real power, but the general secretary of the Chinese Communist Party (de facto leader in one-party communist state) has always held this office since 1993 except for the months of transition.)	Xi Jinping
Hong Kong	Hong Kong, China	Chief Executive	Carrie Lam
Indonesia	Indonesia	President	Joko Widodo
Japan	Japan	Prime Minister	Shinzō Abe
Laos (invited guest)	Laos	President	Bounnhang Vorachith
South Korea	Republic of Korea	President	Moon Jae-in
Malaysia	Malaysia	Prime Minister	Najib Razak
Mexico	Mexico	President	Enrique Peña Nieto
Myanmar (invited guest)	Myanmar	State Counsellor	Aung San Suu Kyi
New Zealand	New Zealand	Prime Minister	Jacinda Ardern
Papua New Guinea	Papua New Guinea	Prime Minister	Peter O'Neill
Peru	Peru	President	Pedro Pablo Kuczynski
Philippines	Philippines	President	Rodrigo Duterte
Russia	Russia	President	Vladimir Putin
Singapore	Singapore	Prime Minister	Lee Hsien Loong
Taiwan	Chinese Taipei	Special Representative of President	James Soong
Thailand	Thailand	Prime Minister	Prayut Chan-o-cha
United States	The United States	President	Donald Trump
Vietnam	Viet Nam	President (Note: The actual head of government of Vietnam is the Prime Minister. The President of Vietnam is legally the head of state, but the General Secretary of the Communist Party of Vietnam is the practical highest political leader in one-party communist state.)	Trần Đại Quang (host)

== Notes ==
Preceded by APEC Peru 2016	APEC meetings 2017	Succeeded by APEC Papua New Guinea 2018
