= Hạc San =

Vietnamese progressive metal band

- Origin: Ho Chi Minh City, Vietnam
- Genres: Progressive metal
- Years active: 2012–present
- Labels: Art Hacova
- Members: Dzũng Pham; Yvol Enuol; Trần Quốc Thắng; Jean Paul Blada; Trần Nho Hoàng
- Past members: See Members
- Website: www.hacsan.vn at the Wayback Machine (archived 7 October 2018)

Hạc San is a Vietnamese progressive metal band formed in 2012 in Ho Chi Minh City. They debuted in 2012 and received several accolades in Vietnam Television (VTV)'s gameshow Vietnamese Songs. The band also performed several times in Vietnamese music festival tour Rock Storm. They first rose to prominence as finalists in 2013 Vietnam Tiger Translate - Battle of the Bands. In December 2015, Hạc San released their debut album, Sét đánh ngang trời (English: Lightning Strikes Across the Sky), based on the Vietnamese fairy tale Thạch Sanh. In April 2020, their second album, Hồn – trăng – máu (English: Spirit – Moon – Blood) was released, whose concept is inspired by the life of Vietnamese poet Hàn Mặc Tử.

== History ==
=== Formation ===
In 2011, after guitarist Dũng Phạm's former band, Final Stage, broke up, he formed a band called Kamejoko (predecessor of Hạc San) with vocalist Hoàng Nghĩa and bassist Hoàng Hiếu. The band recruited two additional members: Minh Quân as keyboardist and Trần Tín as drummer. The band was mainly active at some bars in Ho Chi Minh City, performing cover versions of songs from foreign bands. At that time, Dzung came up with ideas about a new direction for Hạc San and a progressive metal concept album.

=== 2012–2014: Lineup changes and VTV's gameshow Vietnamese Songs ===
In 2012, drummer Yvol Enuol (son of Vietnamese People's Artist inductee Y Moan) and keyboardist Thế Phong joined Hạc San. The band soon changed their musical direction to songwriting and chose progressive metal as their primary genre, incorporating progressive metal and Vietnamese folklore elements.

In early 2013, the band was officially renamed to Hạc San and replaced vocalist Hoàng Nghĩa by Hải Châu. Hạc San made their debut liveshow in Vietnamese Tiger Translate – Battle of the Bands, a music contest that was held in Hanoi and Ho Chi Minh City. They were among the finalists of this contest with other bands such as 18+, Đông Đô, Bụi Gió, Hemelians and Parasite; but they lost to Parasite in the final night. In September 2013, after the departure of Hoàng Hiếu, Thế Phong and Hải Châu, Hạc San recruited Trần Thắng (bassist), Jean Paul Blada (vocalist) and Trần Sơn (keyboardist) to replace them. The band began to record their first songs such as "Hoang Tàn" and "Bí mật của người ra đi" (The Secret of Dead Man). In June 2014, Hạc San collaborated with Lê Thanh Sơn (director of Vietnamese movie Clash) to film their first music video for "Bí mật của người ra đi."

In June 2014, Hạc San won several awards during Vietnam Television's gameshow Vietnamese Songs. The band won an award for "Outstanding arrangement by musicians" (which was voted by show's judge panel) for "Bí mật của người ra đi" in the liveshow that was held in that month. In August 2014, Hạc San won two awards for "Outstanding arrangement by musicians" and "Song of the Month" for "Hoang tàn". In November 2014, the band continued to win an award for "Outstanding arrangement by musicians" for "Sét đánh ngang trời". In November 2014, they joined the lineup of Rock Storm, a Vietnamese music festival tour that was held by Mobifone, and performed in 7 cities around Vietnam.

=== 2015–present: Sét đánh ngang trời and Hồn - trăng - máu ===
In January 2015, Hạc San's "Bí mật của người ra đi" was named "Vietnamese rock song of the year" by VnRock magazine. During this time, the band began a tour called "Hạc tung cánh bay" that was held in Hanoi, Da Nang, and Ho Chi Minh City. In June 2015, Hạc San won the first place in Ho Chi Minh City Television's gameshow Outstanding Family. They also saw the departure of keyboardist Yên Lâm, who was then replaced by Trần Hoàng (a former member of Đồng Đội). From November to December 2015, as Vietnam's representative, Hạc San performed at a European music festival that was held in Hanoi and Conservatory of Ho Chi Minh City. On December 12, 2015, the band officially released concept album titled Sét đánh ngang trời (English: Lightning Strikes Across the Sky). The album was shortlisted for Dedication Music Award's category "Album of the Year" (which was held by Sports and Culture), but ultimately not nominated. Furthermore, the album was named as one of "Vietnamese rock highlights" in 2015 by Zing News. The album is a concept album based on Vietnamese fairytale Thạch Sanh, which included 11 tracks.

In January 2016, Hạc San performed in the live show "Đôi bàn tay thắp lửa" to support cancer patients. In April 2016, their full album, "Sét đánh ngang trời", was uploaded on their official YouTube channel. In May 2017, on their fanpage, Hạc San announced that they were ready to return and was working on their second concept album. In April 2020, Hạc San release their second album, titled Hồn – trăng – máu (English: Spirit – Moon – Blood) on streaming services such as Apple Music and Spotify. Its concept is about the life of Vietnamese poet Hàn Mặc Tử, was composed solely of a 29-minute title track, which is divided into 6 chapters: "Hàn – Nguyệt – Mộng – Phong – Huyết - Tử", dedicated to each stage of his life respectively.

== Musical style ==
Hạc San's music is usually classified as progressive metal. In her review of Sét đánh ngang trời, Minh Trang of Tuổi trẻ newspaper wrote that the album: "is telling a post-modern story, incorporating progressive metal and Vietnamese folklore elements."

== Reception ==
Hà Nội Mới newspaper praises Sét đánh ngang trời: "The band show listeners Thạch Sanh's dangerous but glorious journey, give them the messages of karma." In an article titled "Khắc khoải rock Việt" which is about the decline of Vietnamese rock, Hạc San is one of a few bands who was praised by writer Thùy Trang of Người lao động newspaper, especially for their second album: "...Hồn – trăng – máu is based on the real life of poet Hàn Mặc Tử and is adapted into a fiction story about a lonely organism on a strange planet and its journey to search for life... This unique concept gave Hạc San universal acclaims on many Vietnamese music forums."

== Band members ==
=== Current members ===
- Jean Paul Blada – lead vocals (2013–present)
- Dzũng Phạm – bandleader, lead guitar, composing, backing vocals (2011–present)
- Yvol Enuol – drums, percussion, backing vocals (2013–present)
- Trần Quốc Thắng – bass (2013–present)
- Trần Nho Hoàng – keyboard (2015–present)

=== Former members ===
- Hoàng Hiếu – bass (2011–2013)
- Hoàng Nghĩa – lead vocals (2011–2013)
- Trần Sơn – keyboard
- Yên Lâm – keyboard
- Trần Tín – drums

== Discography ==
- Sét đánh ngang trời (2015)
- Hồn – trăng – máu (2020)

== Accolades ==
| Year | Award | Nominees | Category | Result | Ref |
|---|---|---|---|---|---|
| 2014 | Vietnamese Songs | "Bí mật người ra đi" | Outstanding arrangement by musicians (April liveshow) | Won | |
| 2014 | Vietnamese Songs | "Hoang tàn" | Outstanding arrangement by musicians (August liveshow) | Won | |
| 2014 | Vietnamese Songs | "Hoang tàn" | Song of August | Won | |
| 2014 | Vietnamese Songs | "Sét đánh ngang trời" | Outstanding arrangement by musicians (November liveshow) | Won | |
| 2015 | Outstanding Family | Hạc San | | Won | |
