= Ban Xang Khong =

- Village
- Location within Laos
- Coordinates: 19°52′51″N 102°11′58″E
- Country: Laos
- Province: Luang Prabang
- Time zone: UTC+7 (Laos Standard Time)

Ban Xang Khong or Ban Sang Khong is a village in Luang Prabang Province, Laos. It is located about 5 kilometres (3.1 mi) east of Luang Prabang. The Lue peoples of this village are noted in particular for their arts and crafts. The locals are adept at making traditional Saa paper, which is made from mulberry trees..
