= Hàn Mặc Tử =

Vietnamese poet

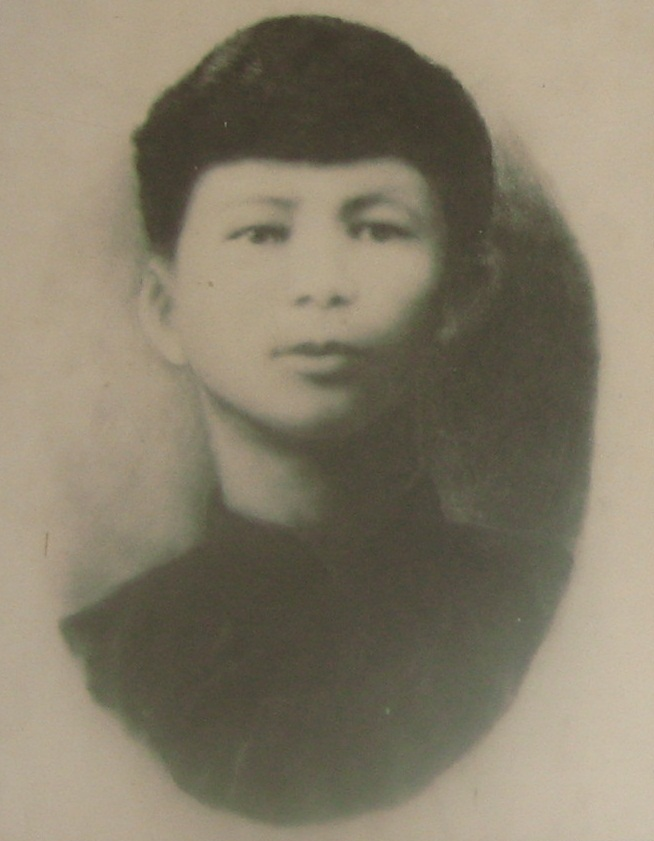
- Hàn Mặc Tử
- Born: Nguyễn Trọng Trí; September 22, 1912; Đồng Hới District, Quảng Bình Province, Vietnam
- Died: November 11, 1940 (aged 28); Qui Nhơn, Bình Định Province, Vietnam
- Resting place: Qui Nhơn, Bình Định Province, Vietnam
- Citizenship: Vietnamese people
- Occupation: Poet
- Writing career
- Language: Vietnamese

Francis Nguyễn Trọng Trí, pen name Hàn Mặc Tử (September 22, 1912 – November 11, 1940), was a Vietnamese poet. He was the most celebrated Vietnamese Catholic literary figure during the colonial era.

He was born Nguyễn Trọng Trí, in Lệ Mỹ Village, Đồng Hới District, Quảng Bình Province. His pen names included Minh Duệ, Phong Trần, Lệ Thanh, and finally Hàn Mặc Tử, by which he is known today. He grew up in a poor family, his father having died when he was young. He showed poetic talent at a young age. When he met Phan Bội Châu, he received encouragement and praise that made him well known. He contracted leprosy in 1937, and was finally hospitalized at Quy Hòa Hospital in September 1940, where he died two months later.

His many poems addressed to real or fictive women—in the manner of Giacomo Leopardi in the West, for example—remain popular, and he is known as a love poet in Vietnam. His poems on folk subjects are also well known.

== Poetry ==
Hàn Mặc Tử's early poems—praised by Phan Bội Châu—are famous for their purity of diction and form, and show him to be a fluent Classicist with a strong interest in realistic subjects. Subsequently, his poetry showed the influence of French Symbolism, and after he fell sick, became increasingly violent and despondent. Personal despair combined with the search for poetic novelty led him to found the short-lived "Chaos" (Loạn) or "Mad" (Ðiên) school of poetry. More than a love poet, Hàn Mặc Tử was a Modernist, who sought to fuse, in a new poetic language, disparate traditions and experiences. Beginning with poems that refreshed the Classical tradition, he went on to absorb the French influence, which he directed toward the turbulence of his own painful history. His language, increasingly tortured, remained both Classical and innovative throughout; and though a Catholic, he made frequent use of Buddhist ideas and imagery.

== Collections ==
- Gái Quê (Countryside Girls) 1936, the only collection published during his lifetime
- Chơi Giữa Mùa Trăng (Playing in the Moon Season)
- Xuân Như Ý (Ideal Spring)
- Ðau Thương (Suffering)
- Thượng Thanh Khí (Fresh Air Above)
- Cẩm Châu Duyên (Cẩm Châu Coast).
- Đây thôn Vĩ dạ (Here is Vĩ Dạ hamlet).

== Poetry in English ==
Hàn Mặc Tử's poetry has not appeared in credible English translations. His complex late style compounds the problems related to translating Vietnamese poetry into English; while the purity of his early style presents another set of challenges. A bilingual Vietnamese–French choice of his poetry was published in 2001 by French scholar Hélène Péras and Vũ Thị Bích (Le Hameau des roseaux , Aryufen).

== Legacy ==
Hàn Mặc Tử is celebrated as Vietnam's first prominent Catholic modern poet, with works like "Đây Thôn Vĩ Dạ" in school curricula since 1989.

== See also ==
- Hạc San
