= InterContinental Danang Sun Peninsula Resort =

Resort & spa in Da Nang, Vietnam

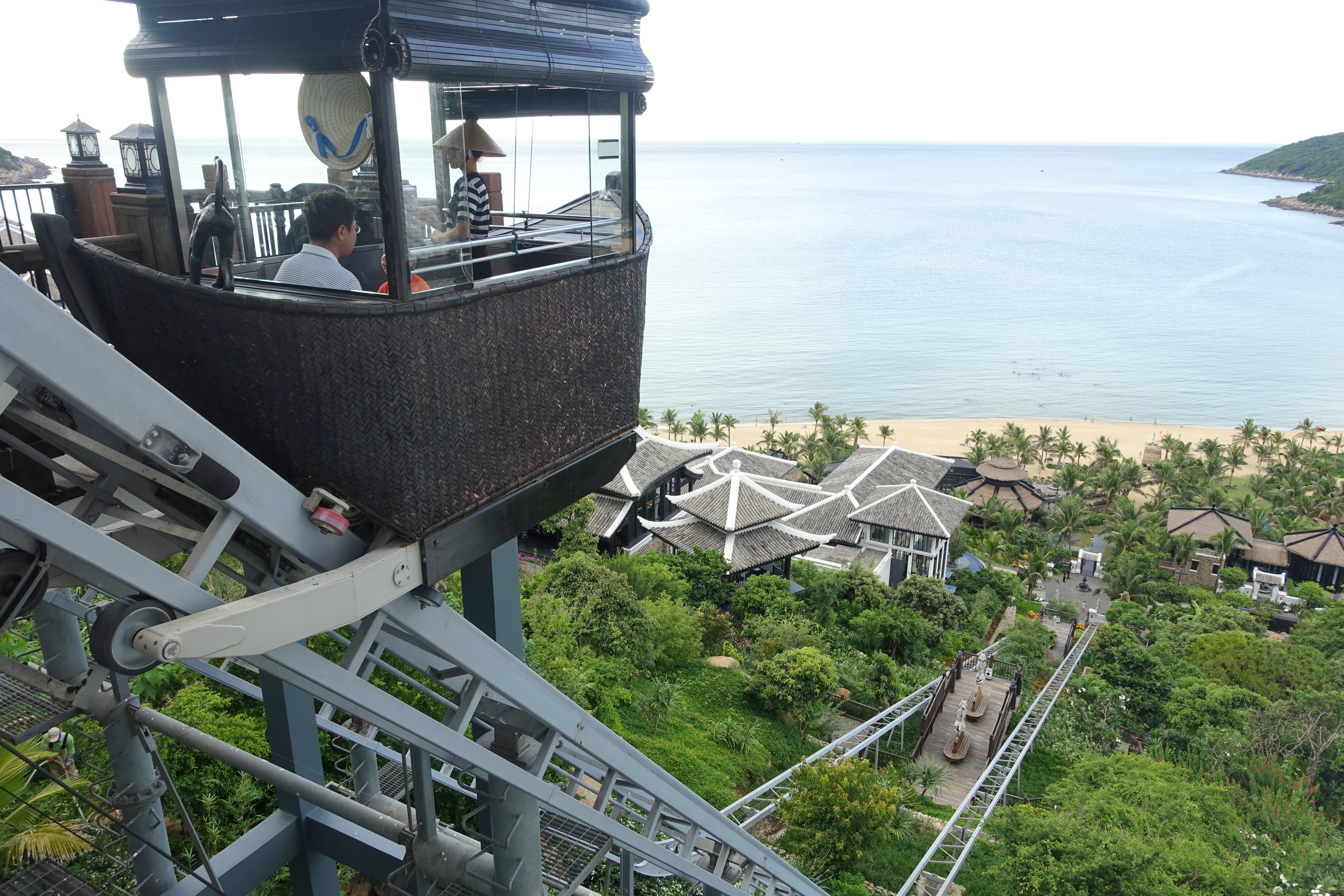
- "Nam Tram" cable car at InterContinental Danang Sun Peninsula Resort

General information
- Location: Da Nang, Vietnam
- Coordinates: 16.1205°N 108.30616°E
- Opening: June 1, 2012
- Owner: Sun Group
- Operator: InterContinental Hotels Group

Design and construction
- Architect: Bill Bensley

Other information
- Number of rooms: 197
- Number of restaurants: 4
- Number of bars: 2

Website
- www.danang.intercontinental.com

InterContinental Danang Sun Peninsula Resort is a resort & spa in Da Nang, Vietnam. It is one of the resorts under the management of InterContinental Hotels Group (IHG) in Vietnam. The resort opened on June 1, 2012. Condé Nast Traveler called it "InterContinental's flagship Vietnam property".

It was the site of APEC Vietnam 2017's Economic Leaders' Meeting, which saw 24 world leaders attend, including US President Donald Trump, CCP General Secreatary Xi Jinping and Russian President Vladimir Putin.

== Location ==
InterContinental Danang Sun Peninsula Resort is located in the Sơn Trà Peninsula of Da Nang, which is also known as Monkey Mountain. It is about a 30-minute drive from Da Nang International Airport and also the downtown of Da Nang. The resort occupies 39 hectares of the peninsula including 700 meters of private beach. The traditional Vietnamese town of Hội An is approximately 45 minutes away from the resort.

== Design ==
This resort was designed by Bill Bensley, a Harvard-educated architect and landscape designer. The design of the resort is inspired by the culture of traditional Vietnamese with luxury and contemporary elements. The resort was under construction for over six years before the official opening date.

== Facilities ==
This resort has about 200 rooms and suites in total with selections of room types. Due to its unusual landscape, a cable car called "Nam Tram" was built to transport people to each of the levels. Other facilities include a children's playroom, games center, fitness center, two outdoor pools, library and daily activities.

It has a HARNN Asian heritage spa with treatment rooms.

== Dining ==
=== Restaurants ===
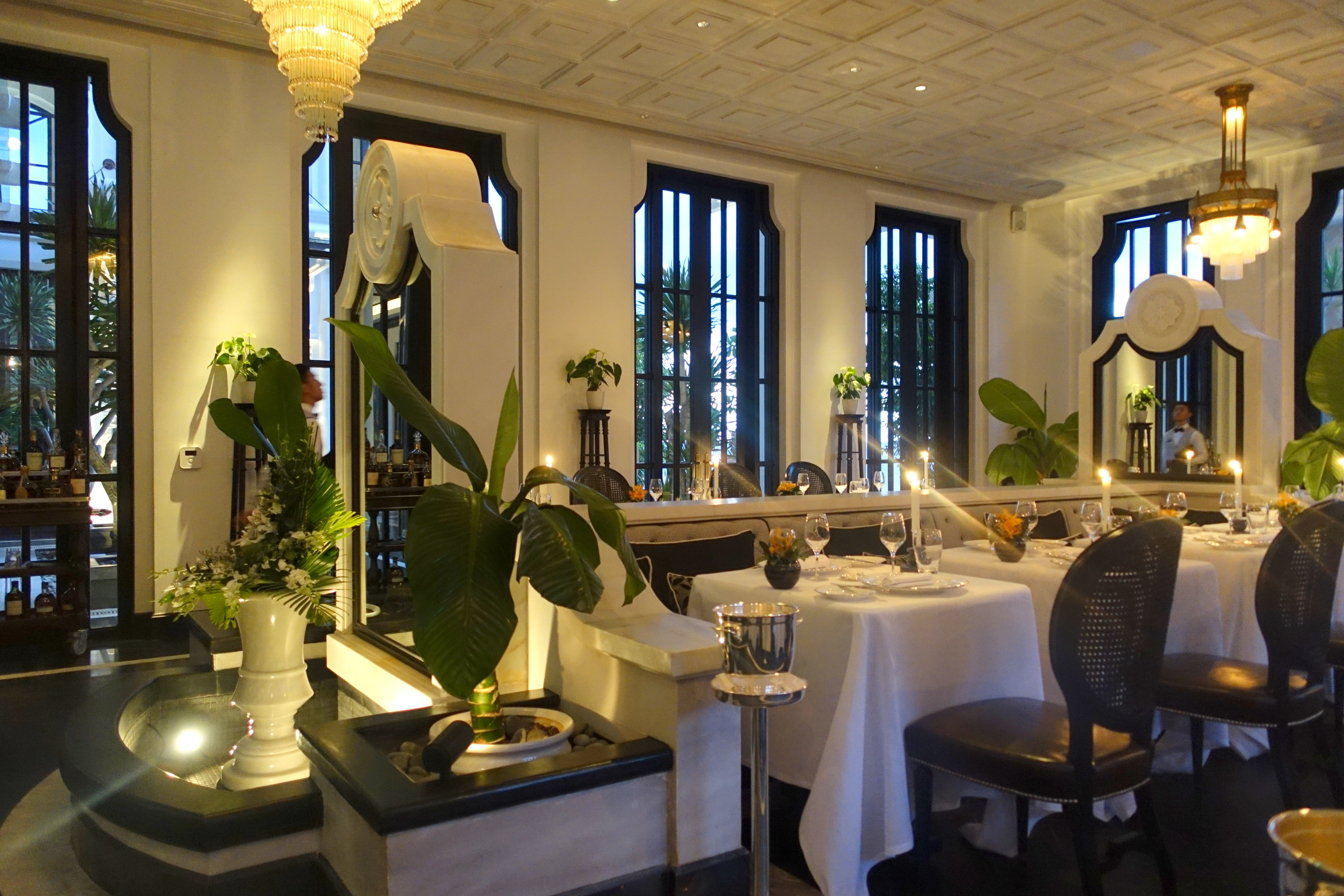
La Maison 1888

- Citron – serves Vietnamese cuisine and Western cuisine with private dining booths floating 100 meters above sea level
- Tingara Modern Japanese – serves Japanese cuisine by Michelin-starred omakase chef Junichi Yoshida
- La Maison 1888 – serves French cuisine; one-star Michelin restaurant by three-star Michelin chef Christian Le Squer
- Barefoot – a beachfront restaurant specialising in seafood and grilled meats

=== Bars ===
- Buffalo Bar – located within La Maison 1888
- Long Bar – a beachfront lounge

== Awards ==
- First Vietnamese resort hotel to be featured on the front page of Condé Nast Traveler
- Luxe List 2012 – Destin Asian
- Fodor's 100 Hotels Award 2012
- Condé Nast Traveler Hot List 2013 – The Best New Hotels of 2013
- Luxury 50 – World Spa and Travel
- Travelers' Choice 2013, Top 25 Hotels in Vietnam – TripAdvisor
- Travelers' Choice 2013, Top 25 Luxury Hotels in Vietnam – TripAdvisor
