= Xuân Hương Lake =

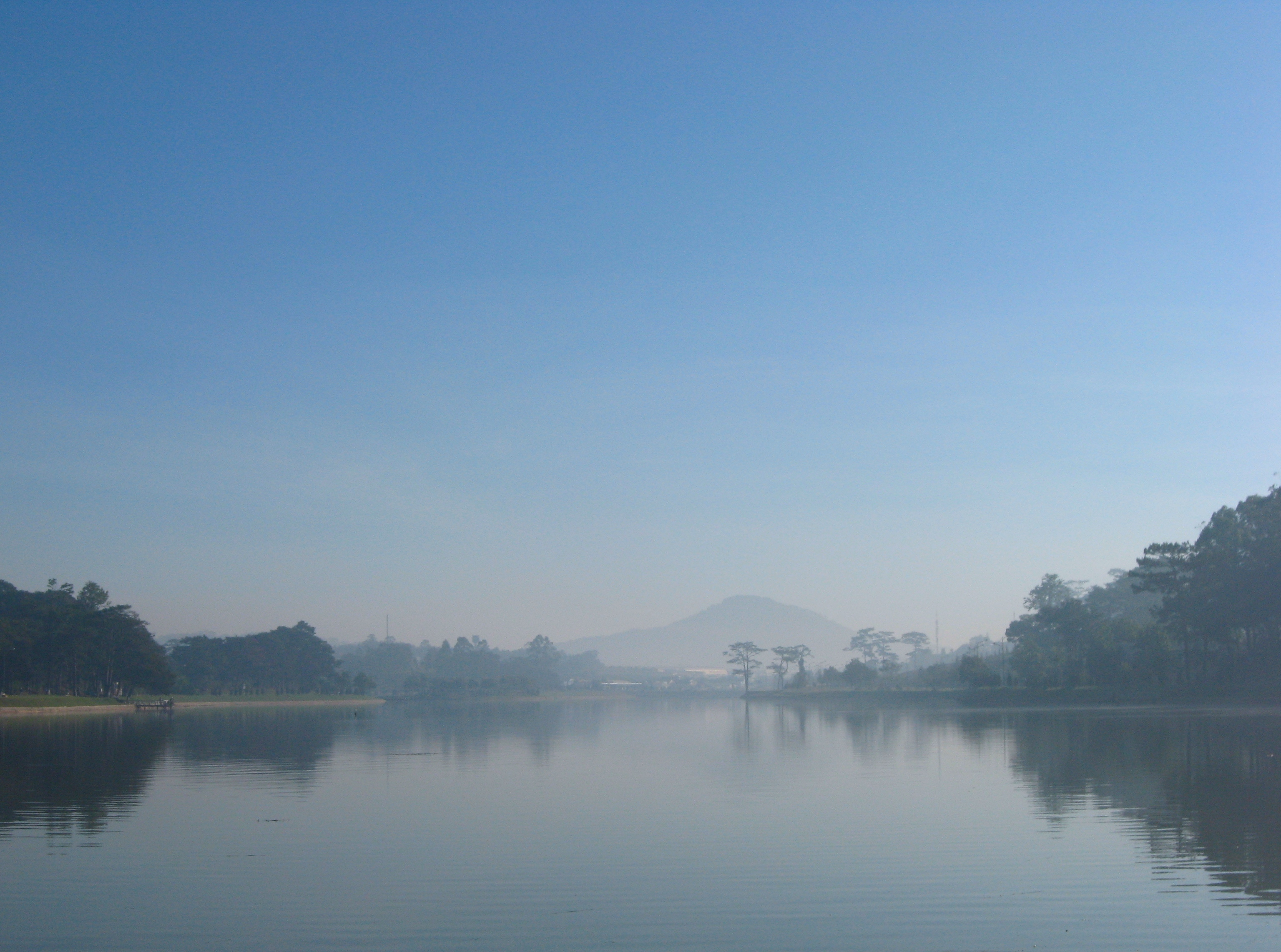
- Interactive map of Xuân Hương Lake
- Location: Da Lat, Lam Dong, Vietnam
- Coordinates: 11°56′30.73″N 108°26′47.98″E
- Type: Artificial lake Reservoir
- River sources: Cam Ly stream
- Built: 1919–1923 (original lake); 1935
- Construction engineer: Labbé (original lake); Trần Đăng Khoa
- Max. length: 2 km (1.2 mi)
- Surface area: 25 ha (62 acres)

Xuân Hương Lake (Vietnamese: Hồ Xuân Hương) is an artificial freshwater lake located in the centre of Đà Lạt city, the provincial capital of Lâm Đồng province, Vietnam.

== Etymology ==
The origin of the lake's name is currently disputed. It is named Xuân Hương either due to the fragrance of the florae commonly found beside the shores of the lake or to commemorate Hồ Xuân Hương, a Vietnamese poet in the 18th century.

Before being renamed as Xuân Hương Lake in 1953 by Nguyễn Vỹ, the town's chairman then, it was called "Grand Lac" (Vietnamese: Hồ Lớn, English: Grand Lake) by the French Indochinese authorities.

== History ==
Before 1919, Xuân Hương Lake was a part of the Cam Ly stream.

In 1919, engineer Labbé built a dam as a project from the idea of envoy Cunhac, which was approved by then-Governor of French Indochina, Paul Doumer to constrict the flow of Cam Ly stream, which formed the first original lake. In 1923, the French Indochinese government of Da Lat town constructed another dam, creating another lake below the first one. However, in March 1932, a reportedly major storm made the two original dams collapse.

In 1934 and 1935, engineer Trần Đăng Khoa designed and constructed a stronger stone dam, which created the lake as known today.

From then, Xuân Hương Lake has been the centre of Da Lat town, now city, for many decades.

== Cultural impact ==
There have been many poems and literature pieces based on the lake for its famous romantic beauty and tranquility. The most notable being "Đà Lạt trăng mờ" by Hàn Mặc Tử, for which the poet had written:

Vietnamese:

"Ai hãy làm thinh chớ nói nhiều,
Để nghe dưới đáy nước hồ reo;
Để nghe tơ liễu run trong gió,
Và để xem trời giải nghĩa yêu..."

Translation:

"Keep silent, don’t talk too much,
To listen to the water ringing at the bottom of the lake
To listen to the willow howling in the wind
And to listen to the meaning of love..."
