= List of tallest buildings in Khánh Hòa province =

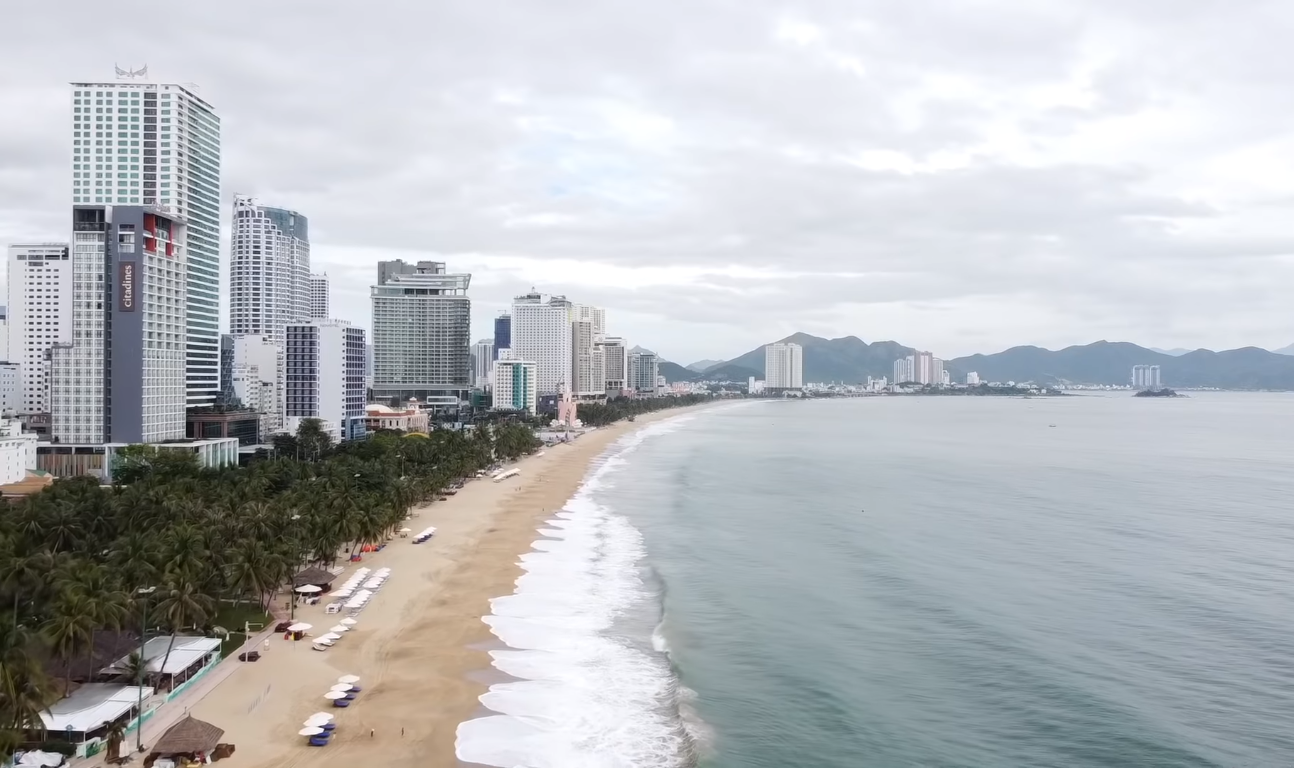
Nha Trang city skyline in 2020.

This is a list of tallest buildings in Khánh Hòa province.

Total number of buildings in Khánh Hòa province
Area	≥50m	≥100m	≥150m
Nha Trang	187	37	9
Cam Lâm	6	0	0
Cam Ranh	2	0	0

The city of Nha Trang seen from above in October 2020 with all the city's buildings stretching along the coast.

== Building completed ==
Below is a list of all completed buildings in Khánh Hòa province with height over 70 m.

The tallest building in Khánh Hòa
The building was once the tallest in Khánh Hòa
The building has been partially completed
The building has been roofed

Class	Building	Image	City, district	Wards	Height	Floor	Complete	Note
1	Mường Thanh Luxury Nha Trang		Nha Trang	Lộc Thọ	166,1	47	2014	The tallest building in Nha Trang city and the whole Khanh Hoa province. At the same time, it is the 9th tallest building in the Central Highlands.
2	Gold Coast North Tower	thế=	Nha Trang	Lộc Thọ	157,3	40	2019	The tallest twin tower in Khánh Hòa province and 10th tallest in Vietnam.
3	Gold Coast South Tower	thế=	Nha Trang	Lộc Thọ	157,3	40	2019	The tallest twin tower in Khánh Hòa province and 10th tallest in Vietnam.
4	Panorama Nha Trang		Nha Trang	Lộc Thọ	156,6	39	2019	
5	Vinpearl Beachfront Nha Trang	thế=	Nha Trang	Lộc Thọ	156,2	41	2018	
6	Meliá Vinpearl Nha Trang Empire	thế=	Nha Trang	Lộc Thọ	156	41	2018	
7	Regalia Gold Hotel	thế=	Nha Trang	Tân Lập	152	40	2019	
8	Virgo Hotel	thế=	Nha Trang	Tân Lập	152	40	2019	
9	Havana Nha Trang	thế=	Nha Trang	Lộc Thọ	150	41	2013	The tallest building Khánh Hòa province from 2013 to 2014
10	Scenia Bay		Nha Trang	Vĩnh Hải	149	40	2020	
11	Ocean Gate Nha Trang	thế=	Nha Trang	Vạn Thạnh	148	40	2019	
12	Khách sạn Hoàng An		Nha Trang	Lộc Thọ	146	39	2022	
13	Mường Thanh Luxury Viễn Triều	thế=	Nha Trang	Vĩnh Phước	145	40	2019	Belongs to the Mường Thanh Luxury Viễn Triều complex
14	La Luna Nha Trang - Diamond		Nha Trang	Vĩnh Hòa	144,5	36	2020	Belongs to La Luna Nha Trang complex
15	La Luna Nha Trang - Luxury Tower		Nha Trang	Vĩnh Hòa	144,5	36	2020	Belongs to La Luna Nha Trang complex
16	La Luna Nha Trang - Platinum Tower		Nha Trang	Vĩnh Hòa	144,5	36	2020	Belongs to La Luna Nha Trang complex
17	Napoleon Castle Nha Trang		Nha Trang	Vĩnh Phước	142,1	40	2019	
18	Oceanus Nha Trang OC1A	thế=	Nha Trang	Vĩnh Phước	141	42	2017	Belongs to the Mường Thanh Viễn Triều complex
19	Oceanus Nha Trang OC1B	thế=	Nha Trang	Vĩnh Phước	141	42	2017	Belongs to the Mường Thanh Viễn Triều complex
20	Hyatt Regency Nha Trang		Nha Trang	Lộc Thọ	140	36	2019	
21	Oceanus Nha Trang OC2A		Nha Trang	Vĩnh Phước	134	40	2018	Belongs to the Mường Thanh Viễn Triều complex
22	Oceanus Nha Trang OC2B		Nha Trang	Vĩnh Phước	134	40	2018	Belongs to the Mường Thanh Viễn Triều complex
23	Oceanus Nha Trang OC3		Nha Trang	Vĩnh Phước	134	40	2018	Belongs to the Mường Thanh Viễn Triều complex
24	Horizon Hotel		Nha Trang	Vĩnh Hòa	131,9	36	2019	
25	Mường Thanh Luxury Khánh Hòa		Nha Trang	Xương Huân	123	40	2018	
26	The Costa Nha Trang	thế=	Nha Trang	Lộc Thọ	122,6	29	2013	
27	Sheraton Nha Trang Hotel & Spa	thế=	Nha Trang	Lộc Thọ	115,1	33	2010	Tallest building Khánh Hòa province from 2010 to 2013
28	Best Western Premier Marvella Nha Trang		Nha Trang	Lộc Thọ	114	30	2022	
29	Meliá Hotel & Resort		Nha Trang	Vĩnh Hòa	114	30	2023	Is a component project in the Vega City project complex. Roof topping in early Q2 2023
30	New World Nha Trang		Nha Trang	Vĩnh Hòa	114	30	2023	Is a component project in the Vega City project complex. Roof topping in early Q2 2023
31	Emerald Bay Hotel Nha Trang		Nha Trang	Lộc Thọ	106	31	2018	
32	Marina Suites		Nha Trang	Vạn Thạnh	105	31	2019	
33	The Art Nest Hotel		Nha Trang	Lộc Thọ	103	27	2019	
34	Mường Thanh Grand Nha Trang		Nha Trang	Vĩnh Hòa	102	28	2013	
35	Ariyana SmartCondotel Nha Trang		Nha Trang	Lộc Thọ	102	28	2017	
36	D'Qua Hotel		Nha Trang	Vạn Thạnh	102	30	2019	
37	Napoleon Hotel		Nha Trang	Vạn Thắng	102	30	2020	
38	The Light Holiday		Nha Trang	Lộc Thọ	99,7	27	2022	
39	Citadines Bayfront Nha Trang		Nha Trang	Lộc Thọ	99,5	26	2017	
40	Maple Hotel & Apartment		Nha Trang	Lộc Thọ	97,7	26	2017	
41	Boton Blue Hotel		Nha Trang	Vĩnh Hòa	95,9	28	2014	
42	Queen Ann Nha Trang Hotel		Nha Trang	Lộc Thọ	95	28	2017	
43	Vesna Hotel		Nha Trang	Lộc Thọ	95	25	2019	
44	Majestic Premium Hotel		Nha Trang	Lộc Thọ	92	27	2017	
45	Erica Nha Trang Hotel		Nha Trang	Lộc Thọ	92	27	2018	
46	Libra Nha Trang		Nha Trang	Lộc Thọ	92	27	2018	
47	New Day Hotel		Nha Trang	Lộc Thọ	92	27	2020	
48	P.H Complex Nha Trang A		Nha Trang	Vĩnh Trường	90,1	26	2019	The tallest social housing project Khánh Hòa province, belonging to the PH.H Complex Apartment complex
49	P.H Complex Nha Trang B		Nha Trang	Vĩnh Trường	90,1	26	2019	The tallest social housing project Khánh Hòa province, belonging to the PH.H Complex Apartment complex
50	P.H Complex Nha Trang C		Nha Trang	Vĩnh Trường	90,1	26	2019	The tallest social housing project Khánh Hòa province, belonging to the PH.H Complex Apartment complex
51	Imperial Nha Trang		Nha Trang	Vĩnh Nguyên	89	26	2018	
52	Stay 7 Nha Trang Hotel		Nha Trang	Lộc Thọ	89	26	2018	
53	Hud Building Nha Trang		Nha Trang	Tân Lập	89	26	2019	
54	Bavico International Hotel		Nha Trang	Xương Huân	85	25	2015	
55	Comodo Nha Trang		Nha Trang	Lộc Thọ	85	25	2018	
56	Joy Trip Nha Trang		Nha Trang	Vĩnh Hòa	85	23	2018	
57	Peninsula Nha Trang		Nha Trang	Vĩnh Trường	84,7	22	2020	
58	Cam Ranh Bay Hotels & Resorts A		Cam Lâm	Cam Hải Đông	84	22	2023	The tallest building in Cam Lâm district, the tallest building outside the city of Nha Trang. Roof topping in the third quarter of 2022.
59	Cam Ranh Bay Hotels & Resorts B		Cam Lâm	Cam Hải Đông	84	22	2023	The tallest building in Cam Lâm district, the tallest building outside the city of Nha Trang. Roof topping in the third quarter of 2022.
60	Khách sạn Holiday		Nha Trang	Vĩnh Hòa	82	24	2022	
61	Potique Hotel		Nha Trang	Lộc Thọ	82	24	2020	
62	December Hotel		Nha Trang	Lộc Thọ	82	24	2022	
63	Duyên Hà Resort		Cam Lâm	Cam Hải Đông	80	21	2017	The building is designed in the shape of a sail.
64	The Arena Light		Cam Ranh	Cam Nghĩa	80	19	2021	The tallest building in the city Cam Ranh. Belongs to The Arena Cam Ranh complex
65	The Arena Sea		Cam Ranh	Cam Nghĩa	79,2	21	2021	Belongs to The Arena Cam Ranh complex
66	MerPerle Beach Hotel		Nha Trang	Lộc Thọ	78	23	2020	
67	Ibis Styles Hotel		Nha Trang	Lộc Thọ	78	23	2017	
68	CT2 VCN Phước Hải		Nha Trang	Phước Hải	77	21	2020	
69	InterContinental Nha Trang	thế=	Nha Trang	Lộc Thọ	76	18	2013	
70	Rosaka Hotel		Nha Trang	Lộc Thọ	75	22	2016	
71	Aaron Hotel		Nha Trang	Lộc Thọ	75	22	2018	
72	Gosia Hotel		Nha Trang	Lộc Thọ	75	22	2018	
73	Melissa Hotel		Nha Trang	Lộc Thọ	75	22	2018	
74	Sea Pearl Hotel		Nha Trang	Lộc Thọ	75	22	2018	
75	Lucky Sun Hotel		Nha Trang	Lộc Thọ	75	22	2019	
76	Nagar Hotel		Nha Trang	Lộc Thọ	75	22	2019	
77	Ventana Hotel		Nha Trang	Lộc Thọ	75	22	2019	
78	Miracle Luxury		Nha Trang	Vĩnh Nguyên	75	22	2022	
79	Shangri-La Nha Trang		Nha Trang	Vĩnh Hòa	74,8	21	2022	
80	UPlaza		Nha Trang	Vĩnh Hải	72	21	2011	
81	Green World Hotel		Nha Trang	Lộc Thọ	72	21	2014	
82	StarCity Hotel & Condotel Beachfront		Nha Trang	Lộc Thọ	72	21	2014	
83	Dendro Gold Hotel		Nha Trang	Lộc Thọ	72	21	2015	
84	Bonjour Hotel		Nha Trang	Lộc Thọ	72	21	2016	
85	Nhân Hòa Diamond Hotel		Nha Trang	Tân Lập	72	21	2018	
86	V Hotel		Nha Trang	Lộc Thọ	72	21	2018	
87	Crown Hotel		Nha Trang	Vĩnh Nguyên	72	21	2019	
88	Ivy Hotel		Nha Trang	Tân Lập	72	21	2019	
89	LeMore Hotel		Nha Trang	Tân Lập	72	21	2019	
90	Le's Cham Hotel		Nha Trang	Tân Lập	72	21	2019	
91	Sata Hotel		Nha Trang	Tân Lập	72	21	2019	
92	Senia Hotel		Nha Trang	Vĩnh Hải	72	21	2019	
93	Daphovina Hotel		Nha Trang	Vĩnh Hải	72	21	2020	
94	Masova Hotel		Nha Trang	Lộc Thọ	72	21	2020	
95	Ruby Hotel		Nha Trang	Vĩnh Nguyên	72	21	2020	
96	Khách sạn 70 Đống Đa		Nha Trang	Tân Lập	72	21	2022	

== Future buildings ==
=== Under construction ===
Class	Building	Location	Height (m)	Floor	Expected to be completed
1	Grand Mark Nha Trang	Nha Trang	140	39	2023
2	Welltone Luxury Residence Soul	Nha Trang	112	33	2024
3	Welltone Luxury Residence Sand	Nha Trang	89	26	2024
4	Welltone Luxury Residence Sea	Nha Trang	89	26	2024
5	New Galaxy The Beach	Nha Trang	78	23	2024
6	New Galaxy The Green	Nha Trang	78	23	2024
7	NovaBeach Cam Ranh C1	Cam Lâm	69	18	2024
8	NovaBeach Cam Ranh C2	Cam Lâm	69	18	2024
9	NovaBeach Cam Ranh C3	Cam Lâm	69	18	2024
10	NovaBeach Cam Ranh C4	Cam Lâm	69	18	2024
11	New Galaxy The Art	Nha Trang	68	20	2024
12	New Galaxy The Lux	Nha Trang	68	20	2024
13	New Galaxy The Modern	Nha Trang	68	20	2024
14	Số 05 Phạm Văn Đồng	Nha Trang	65	17	2023

=== Planned, approved, proposed ===
Class	Building	Ward	Height (m)	Floor	Year	Status
1	IPP Plaza	Nha Trang	150	39	-	Approve
2	Sunshine Marina Nha Trang Bay HH1-2-3	Nha Trang	140	40	-	Propose
3	Sunshine Marina Nha Trang Bay HH4-5	Nha Trang	140	40	-	Propose
4	Quinter Residence	Nha Trang	133	39	2023	Plan
5	Hoang De Apartment	Nha Trang	126	37	2026	Plan
6	Nha Trang Bay Hotels & Suites	Nha Trang	114	30	-	Plan
7	Rixos Nha Trang Beach Resort & Spa	Nha Trang	114	30	-	Plan
8	Otis Nha Trang	Nha Trang	105	thirty first	-	Propose
9	Chung cư Phước Lợi	Nha Trang	77,6	18	-	Approve
10	Cam Ranh Flowers Resort	Cam Lâm	65	17	-	Plan

== Canceled or stopped construction ==
=== Procrastination ===
Class	Building	Location	Height	Floor	Start	Delay	Progress
1	Wyndham Beau Rivage A	Nha Trang	184	50	2014	2019	Construction to the 5th floor
2	Wyndham Beau Rivage B	Nha Trang	184	50	2014	2019	Construction to the 5th floor
3	Belle Hill	Nha Trang	136	40	Undeveloped		Empty land
4	Marina Ocean Park C1	Nha Trang	122	36	Undeveloped		Empty land
5	Marina Ocean Park C2	Nha Trang	122	36	Undeveloped		Empty land
6	Dragon Fairy	Nha Trang	102	30	Undeveloped		Empty land

=== Canceled ===
Building	Location	Height	Floor	Note
Peacock Marina Complex A	Nha Trang	300	81	
Peacock Marina Complex B	Nha Trang	300	81	
Phoenix Tower	Nha Trang	250	65	
Fish Scale Nha Trang	Nha Trang	170	45	
The Russia CT1	Nha Trang	160	45	
The Russia CT2	Nha Trang	160	45	
The Russia CT3	Nha Trang	160	45	
The Russia CT4	Nha Trang	160	45	
The Russia CT5	Nha Trang	160	45	
Trimet Nha Trang	Nha Trang	160	42	
Lighthouse Complex Tower 1	Nha Trang	150	36	
Lighthouse Complex Tower 2	Nha Trang	150	36	
Centara Nha Trang Bay Residence A	Nha Trang	133	39	Current Scenia Bay location
Centara Nha Trang Bay Residence B	Nha Trang	133	39	Current Scenia Bay location
Trang Tien Trade Center	Nha Trang	75	22	Current Panorama Nha Trang location

== Timeline of tallest buildings ==
Highest number of years	Building	Image	Height	Ward
2014 - Present	Mường Thanh Luxury Nha Trang		166,1	Nha Trang; Lộc Thọ ward
2013 - 2014	Havana Nha Trang		150	Nha Trang; Lộc Thọ ward
2010 - 2013	Sheraton Nha Trang Hotel & Spa		115,1	Nha Trang; Lộc Thọ ward
2008 - 2010	Asia Paradise Hotel		61	Nha Trang; Lộc Thọ Ward
2005 - 2009	Asia Paradise Hotel		54	Nha Trang; Lộc Thọ Ward
1996 - 2005	Nha Trang Lodge		44	Nha Trang; Lộc Thọ Ward
1933 - 1996	Christ the King Cathedral, Nha Trang		28	Nha Trang; Phước Tân Ward
784 - 1933	Po Nagar		23	Nha Trang; Vĩnh Phước commune
