= List of hotels: Countries V-W =

This is a list of what are intended to be the notable top hotels by country, five or four star hotels, notable skyscraper landmarks or historic hotels which are covered in multiple reliable publications. It should not be a directory of every hotel in every country:

== Vanuatu ==
- Iririki Island Resort

== Venezuela ==
- Hotel Alba Caracas, Caracas
- Hotel Europa
- InterContinental Hotel Tamanaco
- Isla Multiespacio

== Vietnam ==
- Brinks Hotel, Ho Chi Minh City
- Caravelle Hotel, Ho Chi Minh City
- Hang Nga guesthouse, Da Lat
- Hilton Hanoi Opera Hotel, Hanoi
- Hotel Continental Saigon, Ho Chi Minh City
- Hotel Majestic, Ho Chi Minh City
- InterContinental Nha Trang, Nha Trang, Khánh Hòa Province
- Rex Hotel, Ho Chi Minh City
- Sofitel Dalat Palace, Da Lat
- Sofitel Metropole, Hanoi
- InterContinental Danang Sun Peninsula Resort, Da Nang
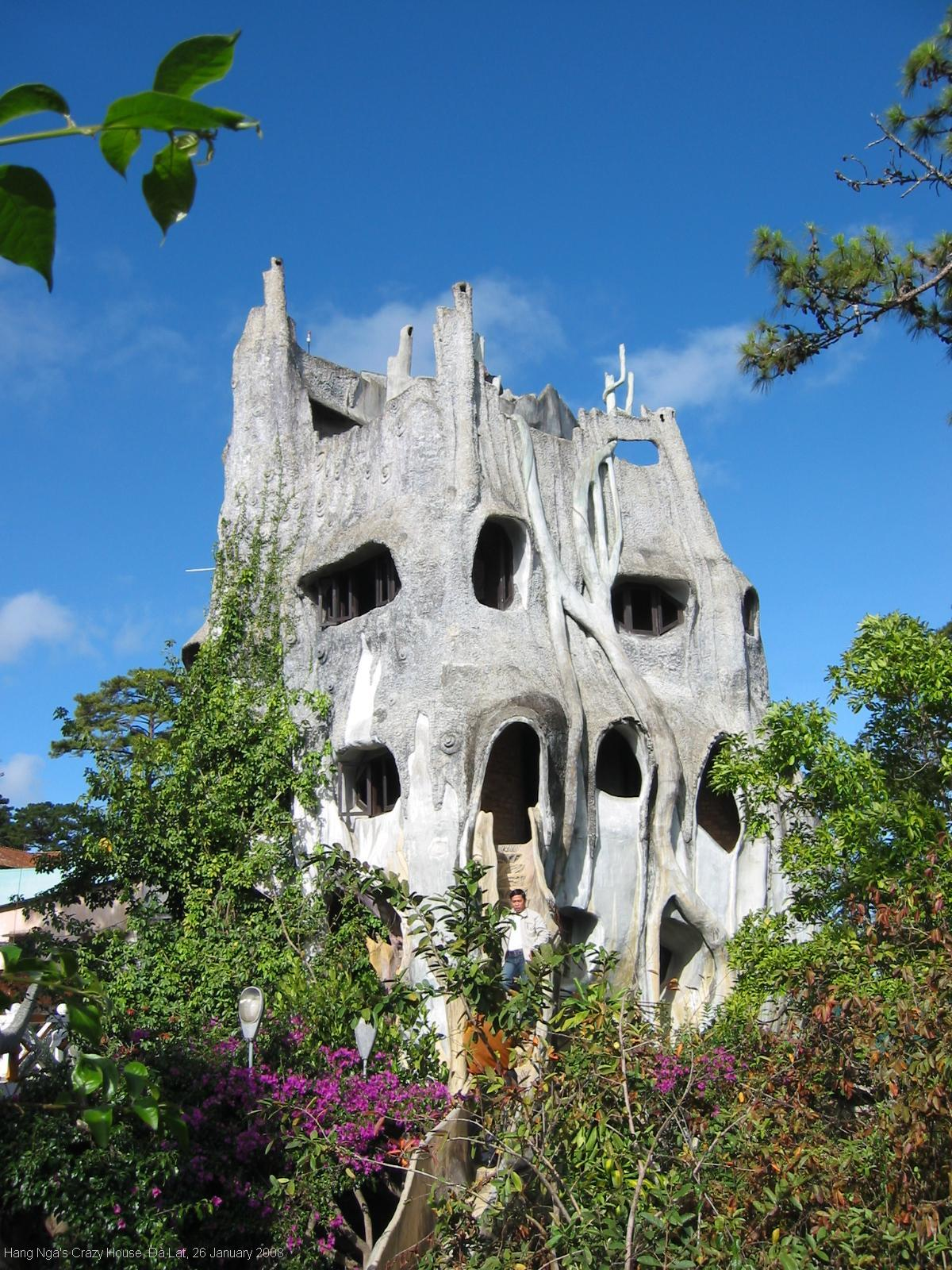
Hang Nga guesthouse

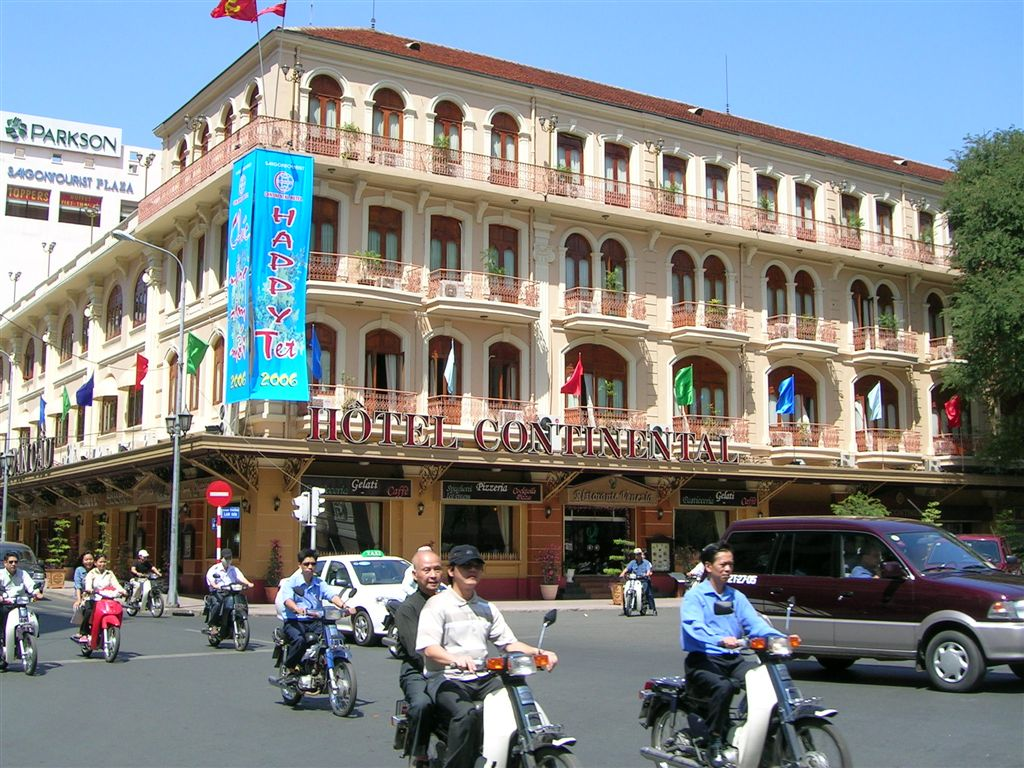
Hotel Continental Saigon

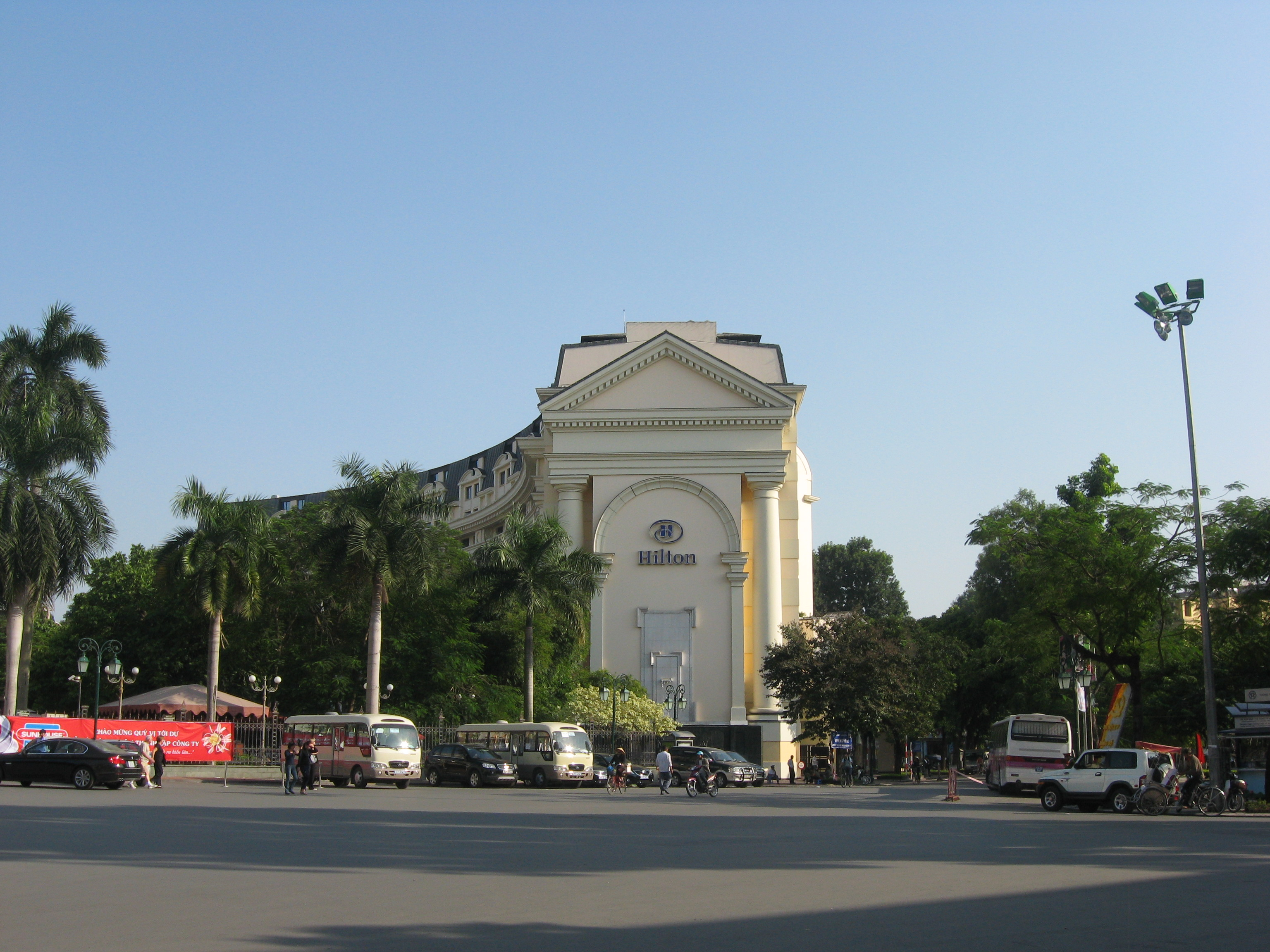
Hilton Hanoi Opera Hotel
