= List of tallest buildings in Vietnam =

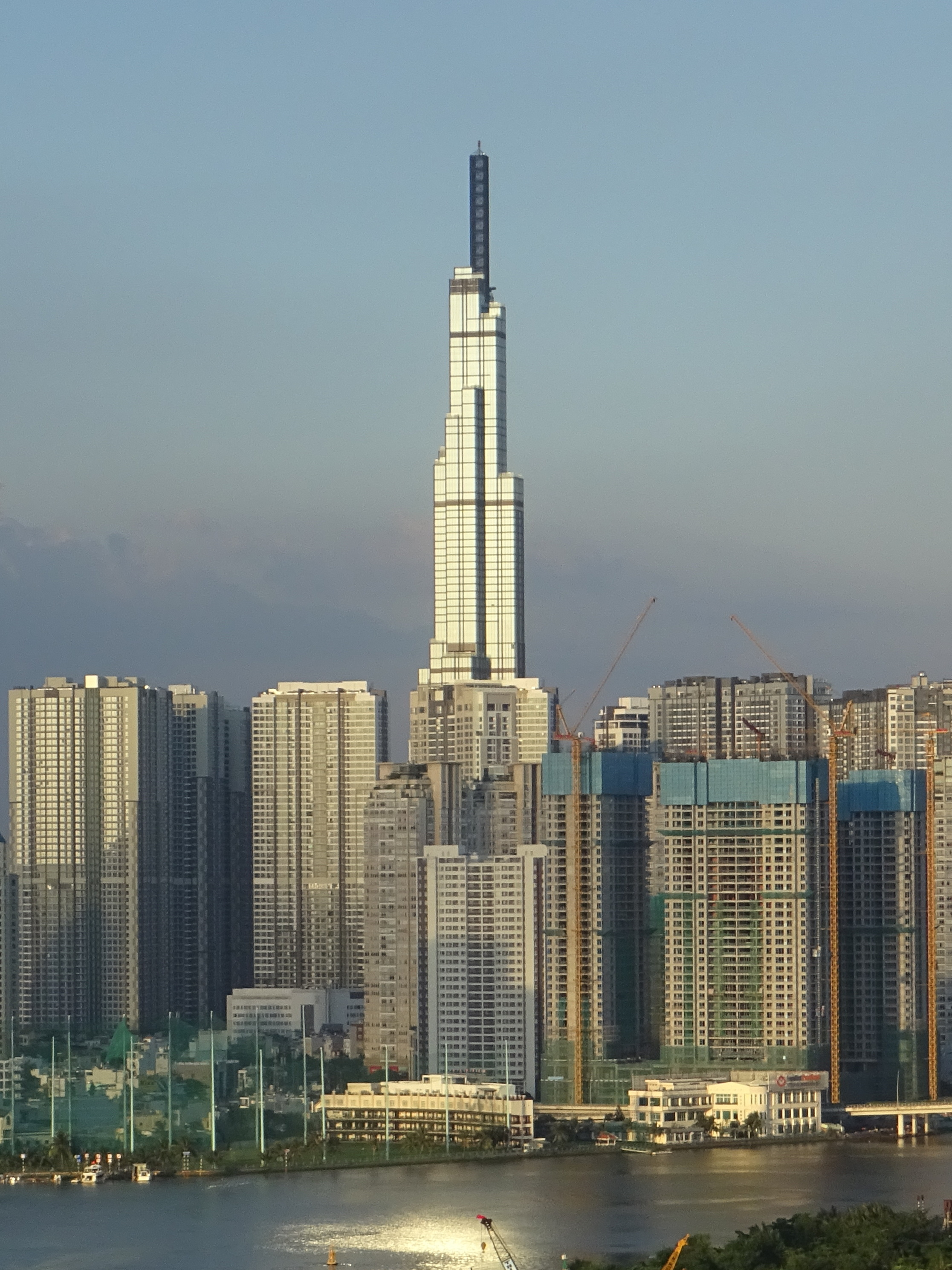
Landmark 81 is currently the tallest building in Vietnam.

This list of tallest buildings in Vietnam ranks skyscrapers in Vietnam by height. The tallest building in Vietnam is the 81-storey Landmark 81 in Saigon (Ho Chi Minh City], which was completed in 2018 at the height of 461.2 m (1,513 ft). It is the seventeenth tallest building in the world.

Skyscrapers of Hanoi are scattered across the western and southern parts of the city, most notably in Nam Từ Liêm, Cầu Giấy, Thanh Xuân and Hoàng Mai districts. This is because the city centre around Hoàn Kiếm district has a height restriction to preserve the old traditional and French colonial architecture. Skyscrapers of Ho Chi Minh City are mostly around the city centre in District 1, District 7 and Bình Thạnh.

== Cities with the most high-rise buildings ==
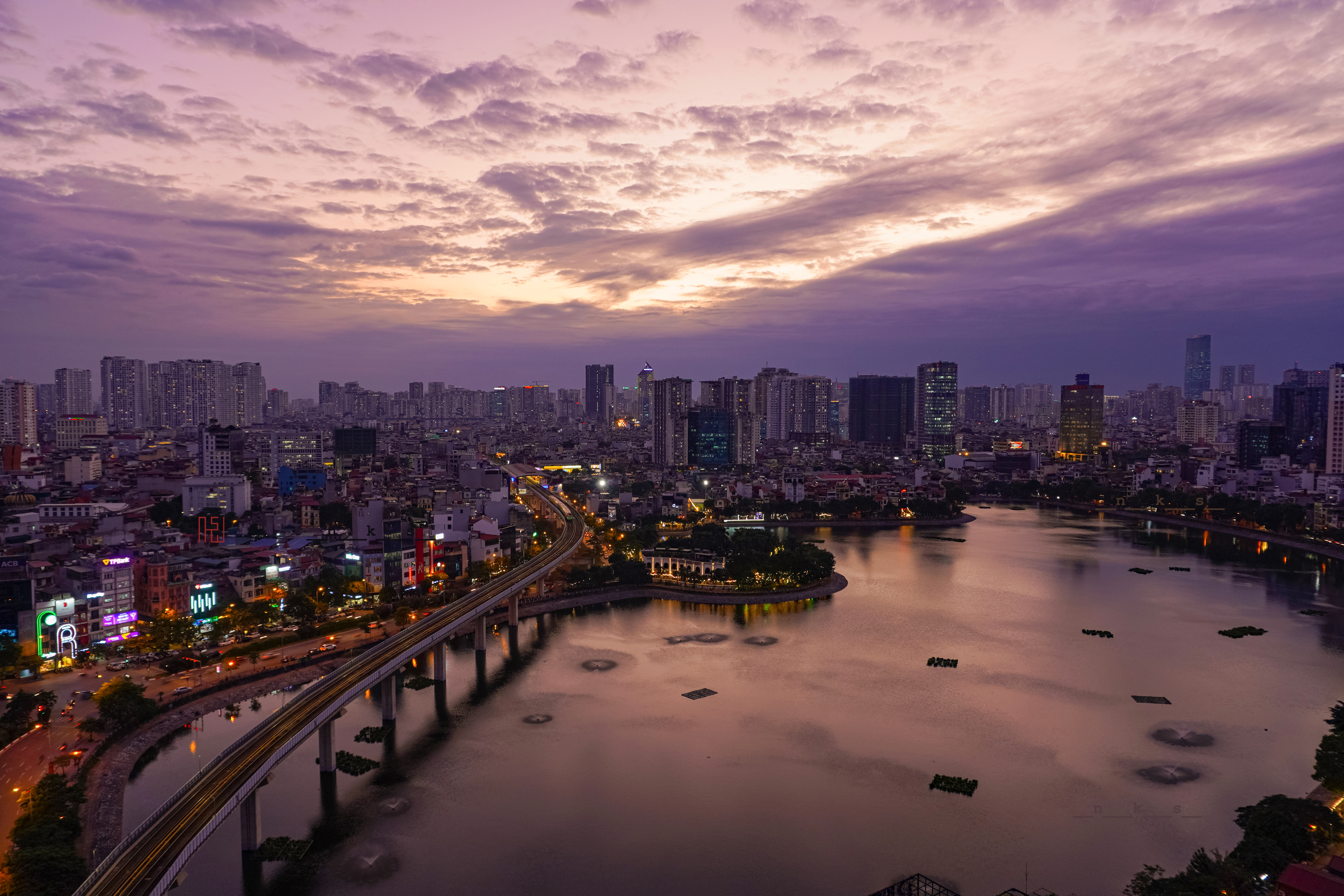

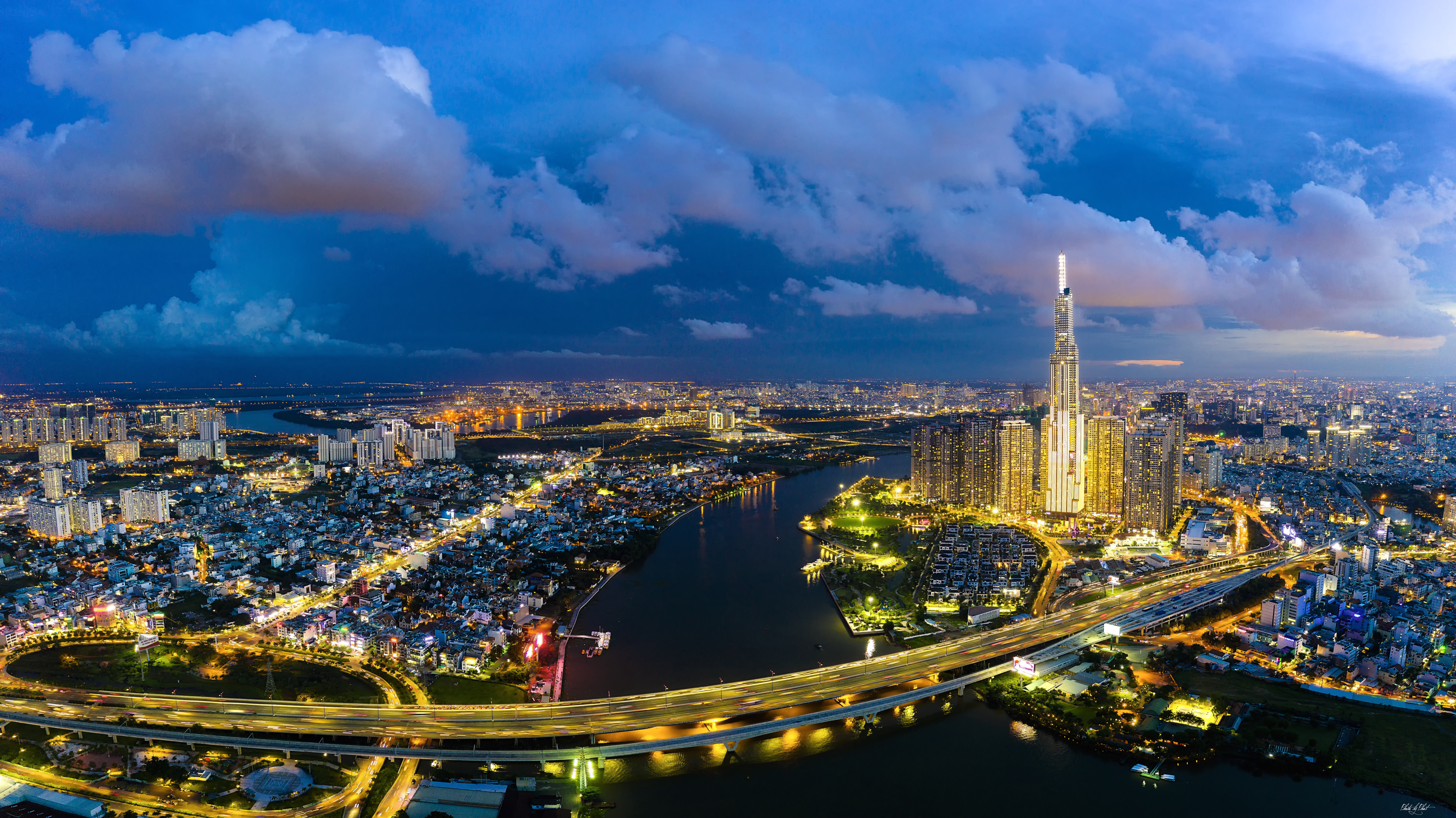
Hanoi and Ho Chi Minh City are the two largest cities in Vietnam, and are also the two cities with the most high-rise buildings, with the number of buildings in two cities equal to are 432 and 243 respectively.

City	Total	≥100 m	≥150 m	≥200 m	≥250 m	≥300 m
Hanoi	486	432	47	4	1	1
Ho Chi Minh City (Saigon)	281	243	35	1	1	1
Đà Nẵng	44	33	11	-	-	-
Nha Trang	46	37	9	-	-	-
Văn Giang district	33	23	10	-	-	-
Hạ Long	19	18	1	-	-	-
Hải Phòng	17	16	1	-	-	-
Thái Nguyên	9	9	-	-	-	-
Vũng Tàu	9	9	-	-	-	-
Quy Nhơn	8	7	1	-	-	-
Thủ Dầu Một	7	7	-	-	-	-
Dĩ An	7	7	-	-	-	-
Bắc Ninh	7	7	-	-	-	-
Vinh	3	3	-	-	-	-
Phan Rang–Tháp Chàm	4	2	2	-	-	-
Thuận An	2	2	-	-	-	-
Hải Dương	2	2	-	-	-	-
Bắc Giang	2	2	-	-	-	-
Đồng Hới	2	2	-	-	-	-
Cities with one high-rise building: Bắc Giang, Cần Thơ, Hà Tĩnh, Huế, Móng Cái, Phủ Lý, Thanh Hóa, Tuy Hòa and Thanh Thủy district.

== Tallest buildings ==
This section contains a list of skyscrapers taller than 160 m (520 ft) at the highest point in Vietnam. Heights are retained from Council on Tall Buildings and Urban Habitat (CTBUH) database unless cited otherwise.

The tallest building in Vietnam
The building was once the tallest in Vietnam
The building has been partially completed
The building has been roofed

Building	Image	Province	District	Ward	Height (m)	Height (ft)	Floor	Complete	Notes
Landmark 81		Ho Chi Minh City	Bình Thạnh	Ward 22, Bình Thạnh district	461,2	1513	81	2018	
Landmark 72		Hanoi	Nam Từ Liêm	Mễ Trì	336	1102	72	2011	
Lotte Center Hanoi		Hanoi	Ba Đình	Cống Vị	272	892	65	2014	
Bitexco Financial Tower	thế=	Ho Chi Minh City	District 1	Bến Nghé	262,5	861	68	2010	
Landmark 72: Apartment tower A		Hanoi	Nam Từ Liêm	Mễ Trì	212	696	48	2011	
Landmark 72: Apartment tower B		Hanoi	Nam Từ Liêm	Mễ Trì	212	696	48	2011	
Vietcombank Tower	thế=	Ho Chi Minh City	District 1	Bến Nghé	206	676	35	2015	
IFC One Saigon		Ho Chi Minh City	District 1	Bến Nghé	195,3	641	42	2014 (topped-out); 2022 (new facade)	
Discovery Complex B		Hanoi	Cầu Giấy	Dịch Vọng	195	640	54	2018	
Saigon Centre 2	thế=	Ho Chi Minh City	District 1	Bến Nghé	193,7	635	42	2017	
HPC Landmark 105	thế=	Hanoi	Hà Đông	La Khê	190	623	50	2018	
Times Square CT1		Đà Nẵng	Sơn Trà	Phước Mỹ	190	623	50	2019 (delay)	
Times Square CT2		Đà Nẵng	Sơn Trà	Phước Mỹ	190	623	50	2019 (delay)	
BID Residence		Hanoi	Hà Đông	La Khê	190	623	50	2023	Roof topping on May 12, 2022
SunBay Park Nuvensa		Ninh Thuận	Phan Rang – Tháp Chàm	Văn Hải	188,9	620	48	2023	Roof topping on January 4, 2022
TechnoPark Tower		Hanoi	Gia Lâm	Đa Tốn	186,2	741	45	2021	
Diamond Crown Hai Phong: The Signature		Hải Phòng	Hải An	Đằng Lâm	186	610	45	2025	Roof topping September 15, 2023
Landmark 2		Ho Chi Minh City	Bình Thạnh	Ward 22, Bình Thạnh district	184,5	591	50	2017	
Aqua 1		Ho Chi Minh City	District 1	Bến Nghé	184,5	591	50	2016	
Aqua 2		Ho Chi Minh City	District 1	Bến Nghé	184,5	591	50	2018	
Luxury 6		Ho Chi Minh City	District 1	Bến Nghé	184,5	591	47	2018	
Park 6		Ho Chi Minh City	Bình Thạnh	Ward 22, Bình Thạnh district	184	604	51	2017	
Landmark 3		Ho Chi Minh City	Bình Thạnh	Ward 22, Bình Thạnh district	180	591	50	2017	
Landmark 4		Ho Chi Minh City	Bình Thạnh	Ward 22, Bình Thạnh district	180	591	50	2017	
Discovery Complex A		Hanoi	Cầu Giấy	Dịch Vọng	180	591	43	2018	
Tokyo Tower		Hanoi	Hà Đông	Vạn Phúc	180	591	51	2017 (delay)	
Landmark Plus		Ho Chi Minh City	Bình Thạnh	Ward 22, Bình Thạnh district	180	591	50	2018	
Ethereal Wyndham Soleil	thế=	Đà Nẵng	Sơn Trà	Phước Mỹ	180	584	50	2019	
Lake Tower		Ho Chi Minh City	District 1	Bến Nghé	180	538	47	2022 (raw part); 2024 (hand over)	Topping out on May 19, 2022
Hatay Millennium A		Hanoi	Hà Đông	Yết Kiêu	179	587	43	2020	
Landmark 5		Ho Chi Minh City	Bình Thạnh	Ward 22, Bình Thạnh district	178	584	50	2017	
Diamond Flower Tower		Hanoi	Thanh Xuân	Nhân Chính	177	581	37	2015	
The West: Tháp chung cư		Hanoi	Cầu Giấy	Dịch Vọng	177	581	50	2019	
Landmark 1	thế=	Ho Chi Minh City	Bình Thạnh	Ward 22, Bình Thạnh district	175,5	576	47	2017	
Park 5	thế=	Ho Chi Minh City	Bình Thạnh district	Ward 22, Bình Thạnh district	175,5	576	47	2018	
Park 7		Ho Chi Minh City	Bình Thạnh district	Ward 22, Bình Thạnh district	175	574	47	2017	
N01-T6 Han Jardin		Hanoi	Bắc Từ Liêm	Xuân Tảo	175	574	45	2024	Roof topping in the third quarter of 2023
N01-T7 Han Jardin		Hanoi	Bắc Từ Liêm	Xuân Tảo	175	574	45	2024	Roof topping in the third quarter of 2023
Golden Park Tower		Hanoi	Cầu Giấy	Yên Hòa	173,2	568	45	2020	
Chung cư Mường Thanh Sơn Trà	thế=	Đà Nẵng	Ngũ Hành Sơn	Mỹ An	171	561	42	2017	
Mường Thanh Luxury Đà Nẵng		Đà Nẵng	Ngũ Hành Sơn	Mỹ An	171	561	42	2017	
Hatay Millennium B		Hanoi	Hà Đông	Yết Kiêu	170	558	40	2020	
Pullman Quy Nhơn		Bình Định	Quy Nhơn	Lê Lợi	168,8	554	42	2020	
Central 3	thế=	Ho Chi Minh City	Bình Thạnh	Ward 22, Bình Thạnh district	168,5	553	47	2016	
Central 2		Ho Chi Minh City	Bình Thạnh	Ward 22, Bình Thạnh district	168	551	47	2016	
Tháp Doanh Nhân		Hanoi	Hà Đông	Yết Kiêu	168	551	52	2018 (raw part); 2019 (hand over)	
Vinacomin Tower		Hanoi	Cầu Giấy	Yên Hòa	167	548	35	2019 (raw part); 2023 (hand over)	
Da Nang Administrative Center	thế=	Đà Nẵng	Hải Châu	Thạch Thang	166,8	547	34	2014	
Mường Thanh Luxury Nha Trang		Khánh Hòa	Nha Trang	Lộc Thọ	166,1	545	47	2014	
The Matrix One B		Hanoi	Nam Từ Liêm	Mễ Trì	166	545	44	2021	
The Matrix One C		Hanoi	Nam Từ Liêm	Mễ Trì	166	545	44	2021	
C5 D'capitale		Hanoi	Cầu Giấy	Trung Hòa	165	541	44	2019	
Lumière Riverside West		Ho Chi Minh City	Thủ Đức	An Phú	165	541	44	2023	
Saigon Times Square		Ho Chi Minh City	District 1	Bến Nghé	164,9	541	40	2012	
Golden House		Ho Chi Minh City	Bình Thạnh	Ward 22, Bình Thạnh district	164,7	540	50	2020	
White House		Ho Chi Minh City	Bình Thạnh	Ward 22, Bình Thạnh district	164,7	540	50	2020	
QMS Top Tower		Hanoi	Hà Đông	Đại Mỗ	164,3	539	45	2020 (trì hoãn)	
The Terra An Hưng V1		Hanoi	Nam Từ Liêm	La Khê	162,7	534	45	2021	
The Terra An Hưng V2		Hanoi	Nam Từ Liêm	La Khê	162,7	534	45	2021	
The Terra An Hưng V3		Hanoi	Nam Từ Liêm	La Khê	162,7	534	45	2021	
Mipec Riverside Tower A		Hanoi	Long Biên	Ngọc Lâm	162,4	533	35	2016	
Mipec Riverside Tower B		Hanoi	Long Biên	Ngọc Lâm	162,4	533	35	2016	
Park 4		Ho Chi Minh City	Bình Thạnh	Ward 22, Bình Thạnh district	162	531	43	2018	
Meliá Vinpearl Danang Riverfront		Đà Nẵng	Sơn Trà	An Hải Tây	162	531	36	2018	
Landmark 6		Ho Chi Minh City	Bình Thạnh	Ward 22, Bình Thạnh district	161	528	45	2017	
HP Landmark Tower		Hanoi	Hà Đông	La Khê	160	525	45	2015	
M2 Metropolis		Hanoi	Ba Đình	Ngọc Khánh	160	525	45	2018	
M3 Metropolis		Hanoi	Ba Đình	Ngọc Khánh	160	525	45	2018	
Meliá Vinpearl Hue	thế=	Huế	Thuận Hóa	Phú Nhuận	160	525	39	2018	
Capital Place Tower 1		Hanoi	Ba Đình	Ngọc Khánh	160	525	37	2020	
The Zei		Hanoi	Nam Từ Liêm	Mỹ Đình 2	160	525	42	2021	
BRG Diamond Residence		Hanoi	Thanh Xuân	Nhân Chính	158,7	521	35	2022	
Crystal Holidays		Ninh Thuận	Phan Rang – Tháp Chàm	Văn Hải	158,3	519	40	2023	Roof topping September 8, 2021
C2 D'capitale		Hanoi	Cầu Giấy	Trung Hòa	158	518	45	2018	
C6 D'capitale		Hanoi	Cầu Giấy	Trung Hòa	158	518	42	2019	
C7 D'capitale		Hanoi	Cầu Giấy	Trung Hòa	158	518	42	2019	
CT12A Golden Silk		Hanoi	Hoàng Mai	Đại Kim	158	518	45	2014	
CT12B Golden Silk		Hanoi	Hoàng Mai	Đại Kim	158	518	45	2014	
CT12C Golden Silk		Hanoi	Hoàng Mai	Đại Kim	158	518	45	2014	
VC2 Golden Heart		Hanoi	Hoàng Mai	Đại Kim	158	518	45	2019	
À la Carte Hạ Long Bay		Quảng Ninh	Hạ Long	Hùng Thắng	158	518	41	2022	
Aqua 3		Ho Chi Minh City	District 1	Bến Nghé	157,3	516	42	2018	
Gold Coast North Tower		Khánh Hòa	Nha Trang	Lộc Thọ	157,3	516	40	2019	
Gold Coast South Tower		Khánh Hòa	Nha Trang	Lộc Thọ	157,3	516	40	2019	
Panorama Nha Trang		Khánh Hòa	Nha Trang	Lộc Thọ	156,6	514	39	2019	
Vinpearl Condotel Beachfront Nha Trang		Khánh Hòa	Nha Trang	Lộc Thọ	156,2	512	41	2018	
Vinpearl Condotel Empire Nha Trang		Khánh Hòa	Nha Trang	Lộc Thọ	156	512	41	2018	
Novotel Danang Premier Han River		Đà Nẵng	Hải Châu	Thạch Thang	155,4	510	37	2012	
Victory Tower		Ho Chi Minh City	District 7	Tân Phú	155	508	33	2011	
The Holiday Ha Long		Quảng Ninh	Hạ Long	Bãi Cháy	154,9	508	39	2024	Roof topping October 3, 2023
Hilton Saigon Hotel	thế=	Ho Chi Minh City	District 1	Bến Nghé	154	505	34	2021	
Phú Hoàng Anh 1C		Ho Chi Minh City	Nhà Bè	Phước Kiển	153,3	503	35	2012	
Phú Hoàng Anh 1D		Ho Chi Minh City	Nhà Bè	Phước Kiển	153,3	503	35	2012	
Pearl Plaza	thế=	Ho Chi Minh City	Bình Thạnh	Ward 25, Bình Thạnh district	152,5	500	32	2015	
Landmark Onsen L1		Hưng Yên	Văn Giang	Phụng Công	152,5	500	40	2023	
Landmark Onsen L2		Hưng Yên	Văn Giang	Phụng Công	152,5	500	40	2023	
Park 2	thế=	Ho Chi Minh City	Bình Thạnh	Ward 22, Bình Thạnh district	152,4	500	40	2017	
Thăng Long Number One A		Hanoi	Cầu Giấy	Trung Hòa	152	499	40	2014	
Thăng Long Number One B		Hanoi	Cầu Giấy	Trung Hòa	152	499	40	2014	
Regalia Gold Hotel	thế=	Khánh Hòa	Nha Trang	Tân Lập	152	499	40	2019	
Virgo Hotel	thế=	Khánh Hòa	Nha Trang	Tân Lập	152	499	40	2019	
Mỹ Đình Pearl Hotel		Hanoi	Nam Từ Liêm	Phú Đô	152	499	40	2024	
Park 3	thế=	Ho Chi Minh City	Bình Thạnh	Ward 22, Bình Thạnh district	151	499	42	2017	
S2 Skylake	thế=	Hanoi	Nam Từ Liêm	Mỹ Đình 1	151	495	42	2019	
S3 Skylake	thế=	Hanoi	Nam Từ Liêm	Mỹ Đình 1	151	495	42	2019	
The View Riviera Point T6		Ho Chi Minh City	District 7	Tân Phú	150,7	494	41	2019	
The View Riviera Point T7		Ho Chi Minh City	District 7	Tân Phú	150,7	494	41	2019	
The View Riviera Point T8		Ho Chi Minh City	District 7	Tân Phú	150,7	494	42	2019	
EVN Tower 1		Hanoi	Ba Đình	Trúc Bạch	150	492	33	2013	
Havana Nha Trang	thế=	Khánh Hòa	Nha Trang	Lộc Thọ	150	492	41	2013	
Sunshine Center A		Hanoi	Nam Từ Liêm	Mỹ Đình 2	150	492	41	2019	
Sunshine Center B		Hanoi	Nam Từ Liêm	Mỹ Đình 2	150	492	41	2019	
M Landmark Residences		Đà Nẵng	Hải Châu	Hải Châu 1	150	492	45	2021	
Sky Oasis S3		Hưng Yên	Văn Giang	Xuân Quan	150	492	41	2022	
Sky Oasis S-Premium		Hưng Yên	Văn Giang	Xuân Quan	150	492	41	2022	

=== Highest by region ===
Area	Building	Image	Location	Height	Number of floors	Complete
Southeast	Landmark 81	thế=	Ho Chi Minh City	461,2	81	2018
Red River Delta	Landmark 72		Hanoi	328,6	72	2011
South Central Coast	Times Square Danang		Đà Nẵng	190	50	2021
North Central Coast	Meliá Vinpearl Hue	thế=	Huế	160	39	2018
Northeast	À la Carte Hạ Long Bay		Hạ Long	158	41	2022
Mekong Delta	Sheraton Can Tho		Cần Thơ	123	30	2016
Northwest	Wyndham Lynn Times		Huyện Thanh Thủy	125,8	35	2021
Central Highlands	Đức Long Tower		Pleiku	68	20	2011

=== Highest by province ===
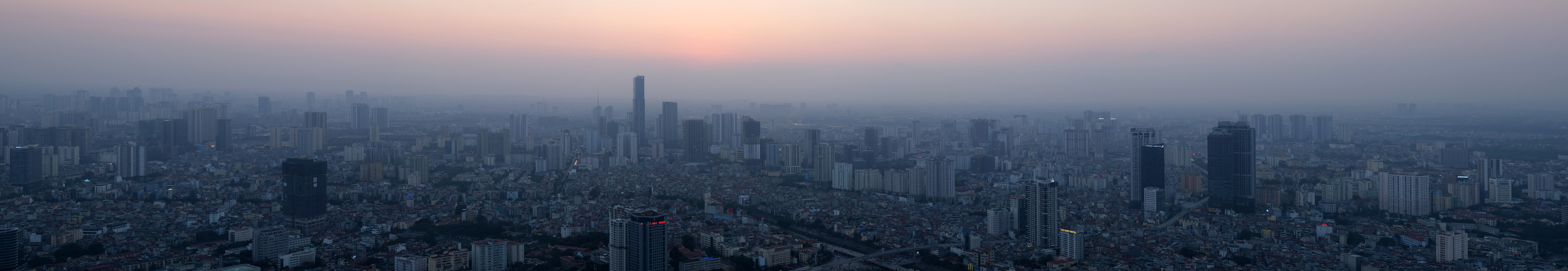
Three tallest buildings in Hanoi: Keangnam Hanoi Landmark Tower 336m, Lotte Center Hanoi 272m, TechnoPark Tower 226m
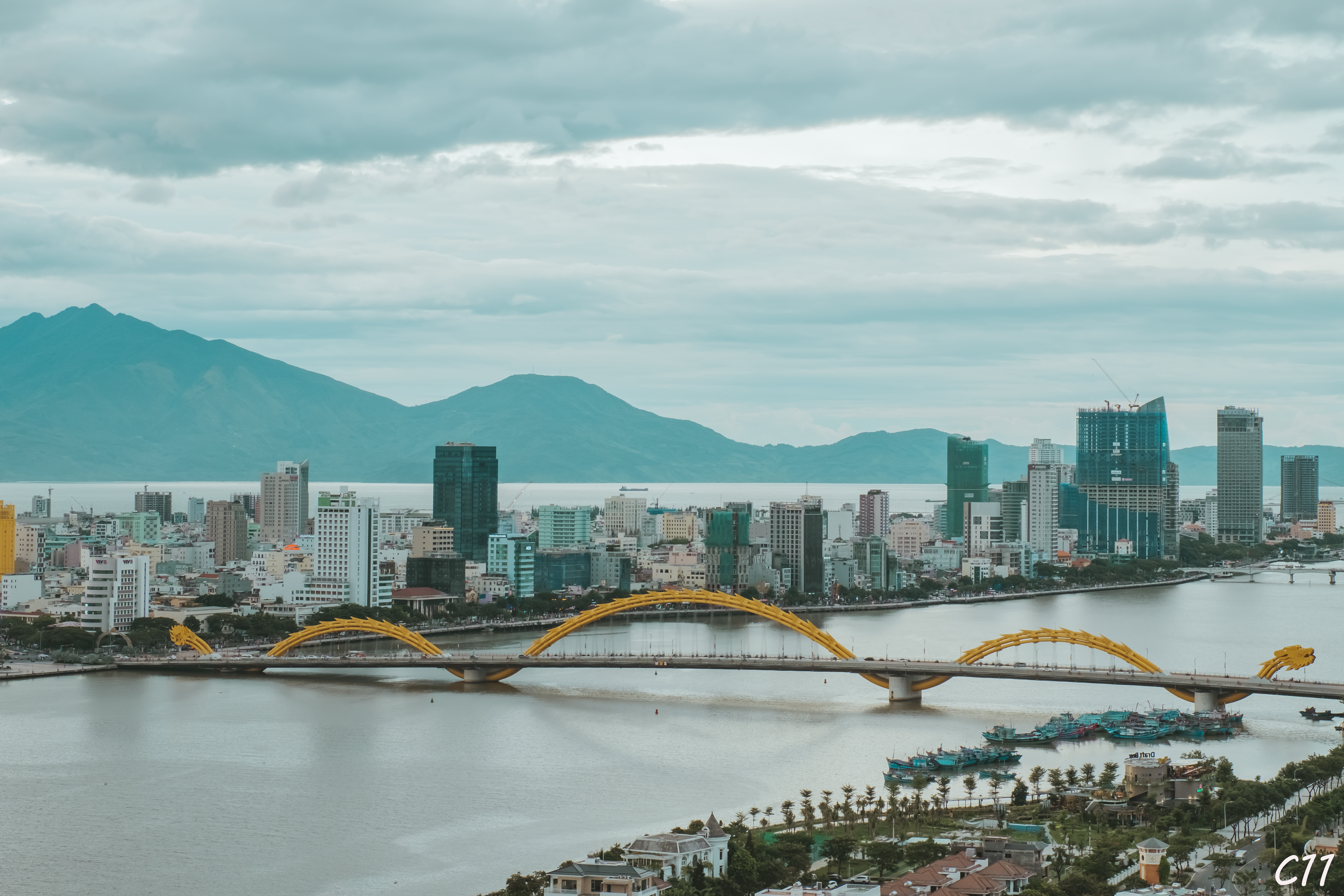
List of tallest buildings in Danang

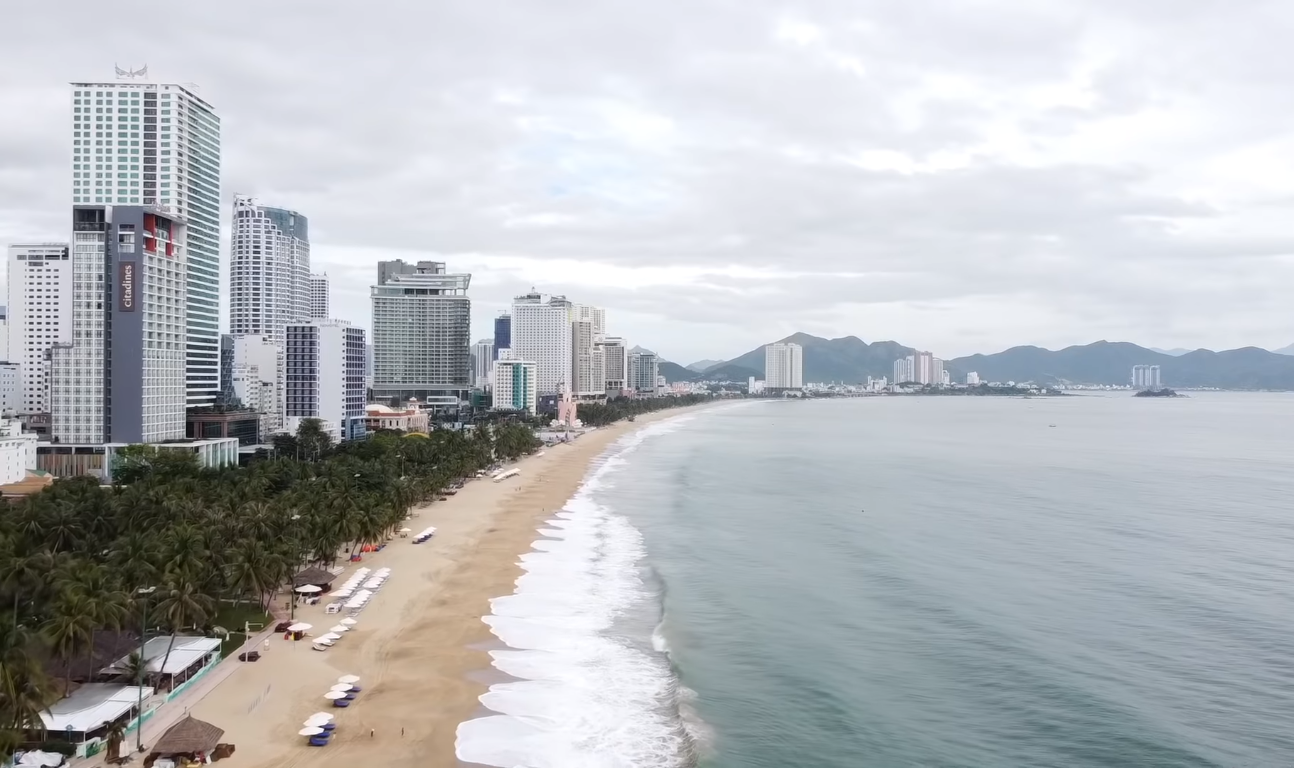
List of tallest buildings in Khánh Hòa province

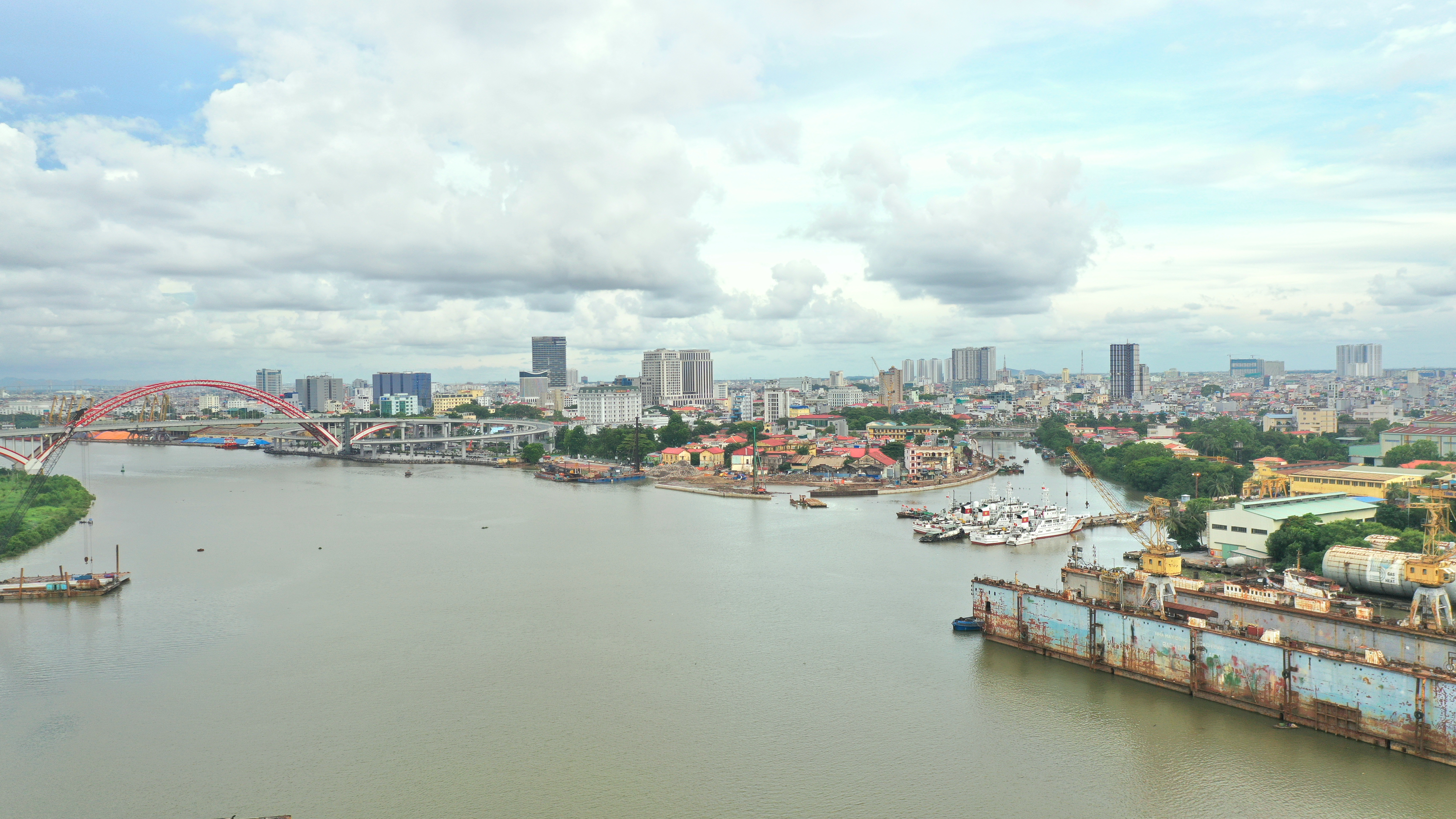
List of tallest buildings in Haiphong

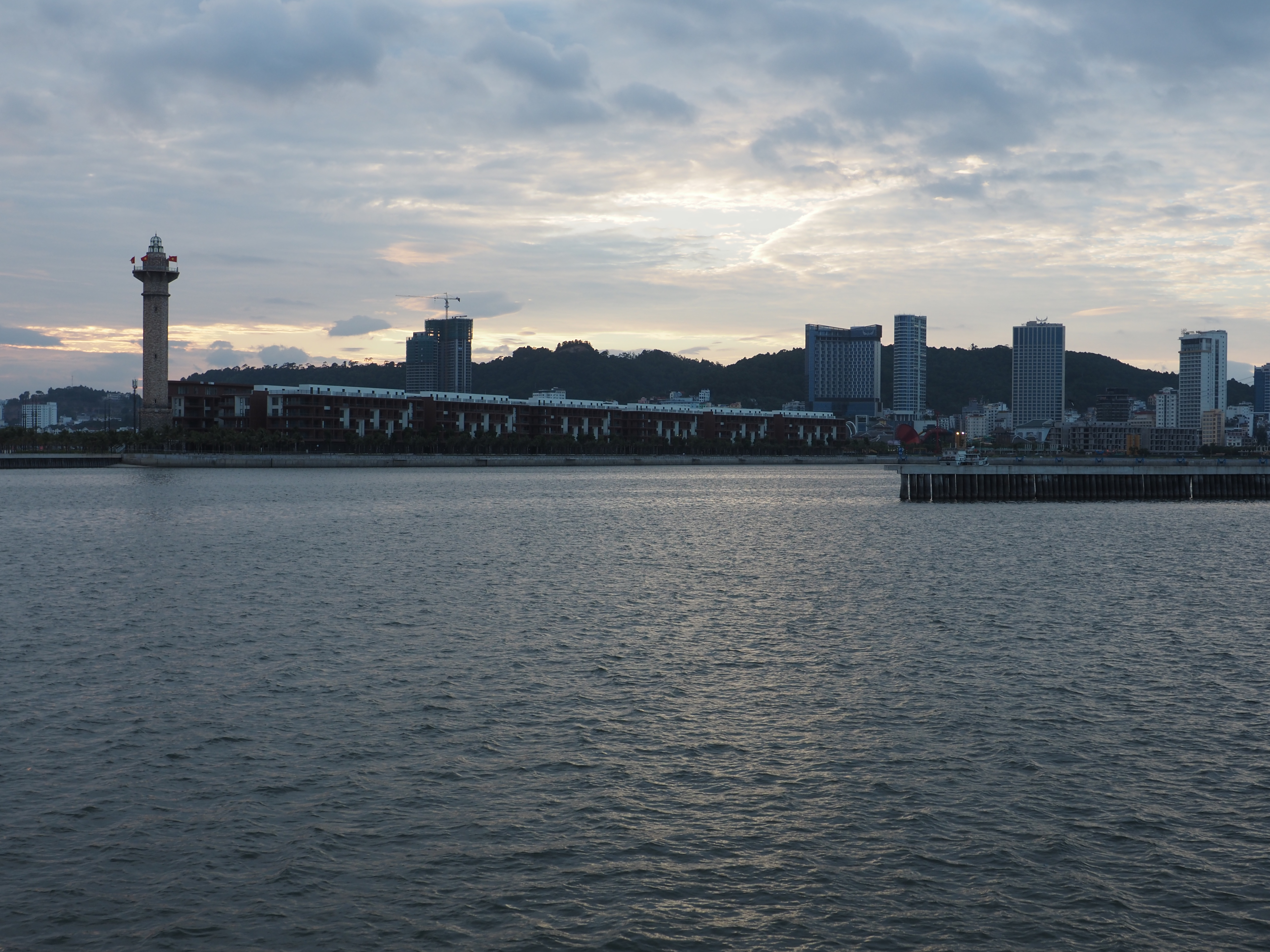
Danh sách tòa nhà cao nhất Quảng Ninh

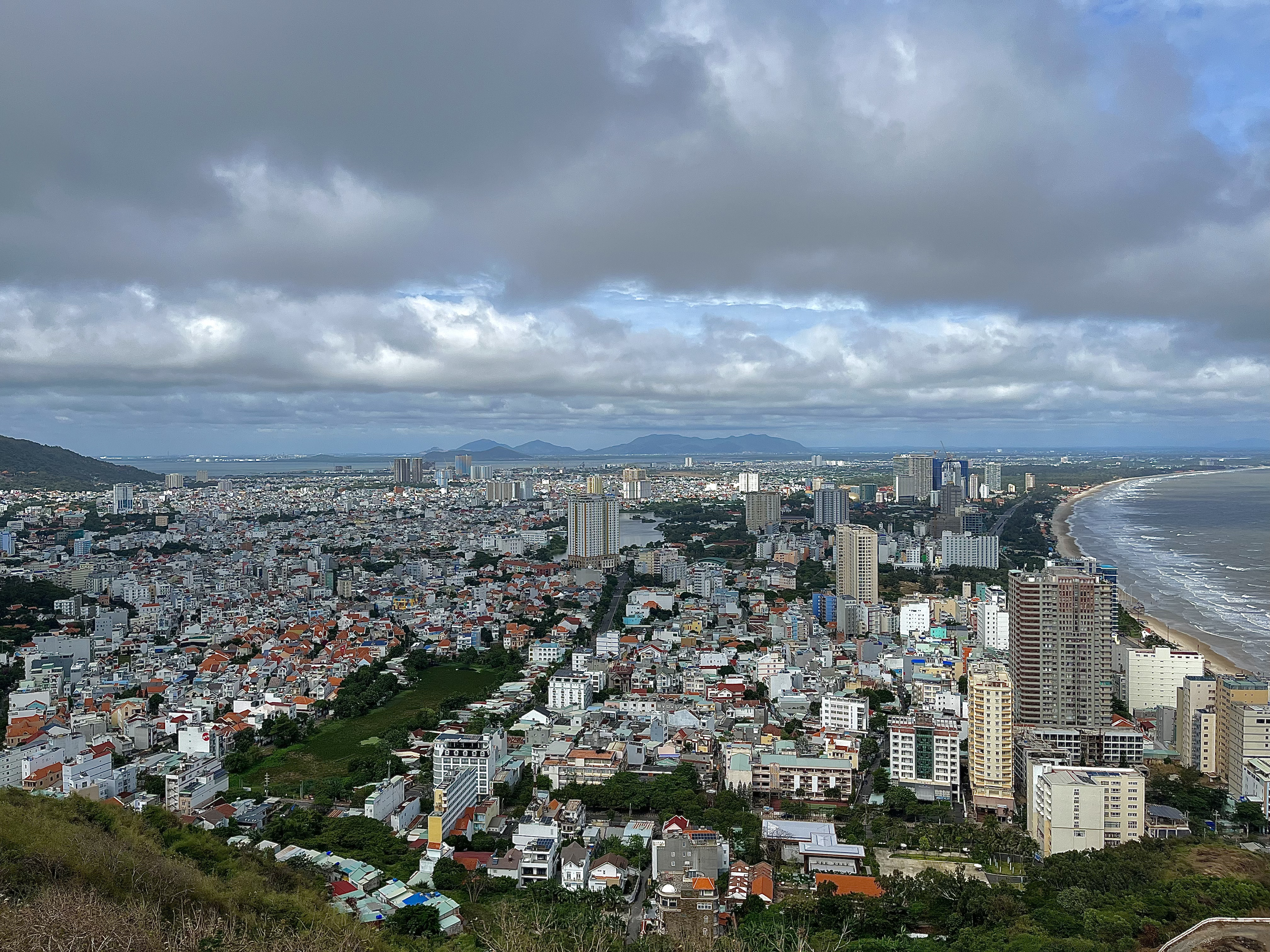
List of tallest buildings in Bà Rịa – Vũng Tàu province

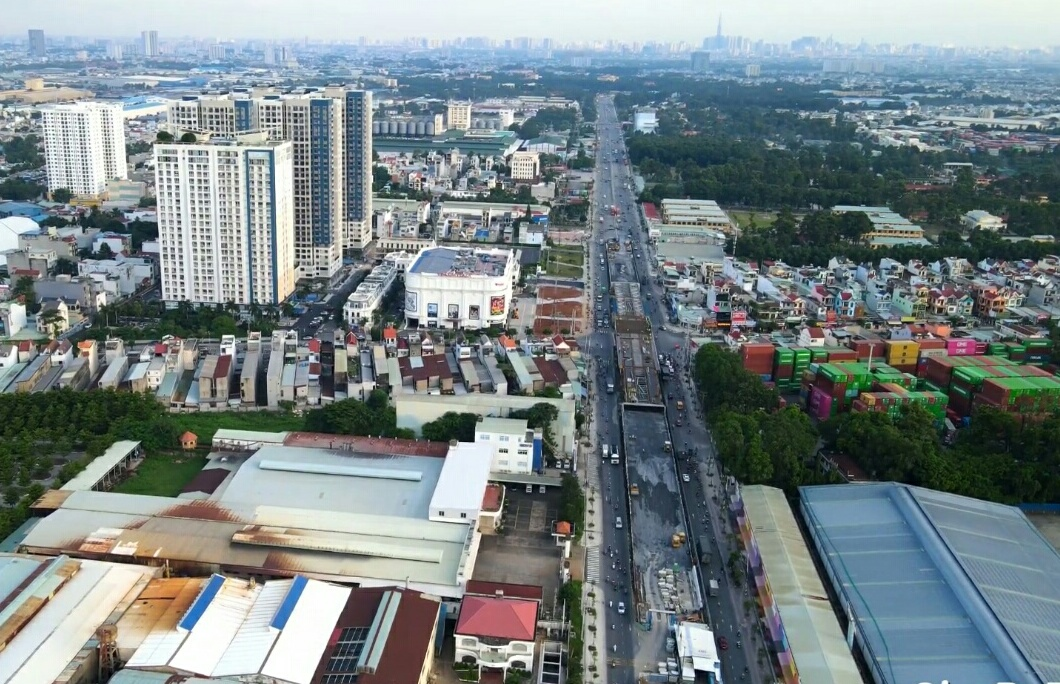
List of tallest buildings in Bình Dương province

== Tallest buildings under construction ==
This section contains a list of skyscrapers taller than 150 metres at the highest point under construction in Vietnam. Heights are retained from CTBUH database unless cited otherwise.

Rank	Building	Location	Height (m)	Floors	Expected completion / Years
1	Spirit of Saigon West Tower	Ho Chi Minh City	240 m (790 ft)	55	2024
2	The Sun Tower	Ho Chi Minh City	240 m (790 ft)	55	2024
3	Spirit of Saigon East Tower	Ho Chi Minh City	218 m (715 ft)	48	2023
4	SunBay Park Lazurya Phan Rang Bay	Phan Rang–Tháp Chàm	209 m (686 ft)	55	2023
5	Wyndham Soleil Đà Nẵng A2	Đà Nẵng	199 m (653 ft)	57	2023
6	Wyndham Soleil Đà Nẵng Nimbus	Đà Nẵng	199 m (653 ft)	57	2023
7	IFC One Saigon	Ho Chi Minh City	195 m (640 ft)	42	2023
8	Diamond Crown Tower	Hải Phòng	186 m (610 ft)	45	2023
9	Grand Sunlake Lake View	Hanoi	182 m (597 ft)	50	2023
10	Cocobay Tower East	Đà Nẵng	181 m (594 ft)	48	2024
11	Cocobay Tower West	Đà Nẵng	181 m (594 ft)	48	2024
12	Wyndham Soleil Đà Nẵng B	Đà Nẵng	180 m (590 ft)	50	2023
13	Han Jardin A	Hanoi	171 m (561 ft)	45	2023
14	Han Jardin B	Hanoi	171 m (561 ft)	45	2023
15	Sun Grand Marina Town A	Hạ Long	170 m (560 ft)	50	2023
16	Sun Grand Marina Town B	Hạ Long	170 m (560 ft)	50	2023
17	Wyndham The Sailing Quy Nhơn	Quy Nhơn	165 m (541 ft)	41	2023
18	Grand Sunlake City View	Hanoi	164 m (538 ft)	45	2023
19	Cove Grand Marina	Ho Chi Minh City	164 m (538 ft)	47	2024
20	Sea Grand Marina	Ho Chi Minh City	164 m (538 ft)	47	2024
21	Spring Grand Marina	Ho Chi Minh City	164 m (538 ft)	47	2025
22	Strait Grand Marina	Ho Chi Minh City	164 m (538 ft)	47	2025
23	Diamond Crown Residence	Hải Phòng	161 m (528 ft)	39	2023
24	Sunshine Empire T1	Hanoi	160 m (520 ft)	47	2024
25	Sunshine Empire T2	Hanoi	160 m (520 ft)	47	2024
26	Lagoon Grand Marina	Ho Chi Minh City	157 m (515 ft)	45	2024
27	Haven Park Residences H1	Văn Giang	156 m (512 ft)	41	2023
28	Haven Park Residences H2	Văn Giang	156 m (512 ft)	41	2023
29	Sunwah Pearl	Ho Chi Minh City	155 m (509 ft)	N/A	—
30	Landmark Onsen L1	Văn Giang	152 m (499 ft)	40	2023
31	Landmark Onsen L2	Văn Giang	152 m (499 ft)	40	2023
32	Beau Rivage Nha Trang A	Nha Trang	152 m (499 ft)	40	—
33	Beau Rivage Nha Trang B	Nha Trang	152 m (499 ft)	40	—
34	Astral City Virgo	Thuận An	152 m (499 ft)	40	2023
35	Happy One Central Hetia	Thủ Dầu Một	151 m (495 ft)	40	2023
36	Happy One Central Lovia	Thủ Dầu Một	151 m (495 ft)	40	2023
37	Grand Center	Quy Nhơn	150 m (490 ft)	43	2023
38	Masteri Lumière Riverside West	Ho Chi Minh City	150 m (490 ft)	44	2023

* Table entries with dashes (—) indicate that information regarding building dates of completion has not yet been released.

== Delayed ==
Class	Building	Location	Height	Number of floors	Start	Delay	Progress
first	VietinBank Business Center Office Tower	Hanoi	363.2	68	2010	2014	Construction to the 17th floor
2	VietinBank Business Center Hotel Tower	Hanoi	252	48	2010	2014	Construction to the 7th floor
3	One Central Saigon A	Ho Chi Minh City	240	55	2012/2019	2022	Construction to the 14th floor
4	Saigon Melinh Tower 1	Ho Chi Minh City	240	48	Not implemented yet		Empty land
5	Alpha Hill A	Ho Chi Minh City	221.8	49	2018	2019	Foundation under construction
6	Alpha Hill B	Ho Chi Minh City	221.8	49	2018	2019	Foundation under construction
7	One Central Saigon B	Ho Chi Minh City	218	48	2012/2019	2022	Construction to the 14th floor
8	Dragon Riverside Tower	Ho Chi Minh City	202	53	Not implemented yet		Empty land
9	Saigon Jewelry Center Tower	Ho Chi Minh City	200	52	Not implemented yet		Empty land
10	Times Square Da Nang CT1	Danang	190	52	2018	2021	Complete rough section
11	Times Square Da Nang CT2	Danang	190	52	2018	2021	Complete rough section
12	Habico Tower	Hanoi	180	36	2008	2011	Construction to the 9th floor
13	Saigon Melinh Tower 2	Ho Chi Minh City	180	36	Not implemented yet		Empty land
14	Tokyo Tower	Hanoi	180	51	2015	2018	Complete rough section
15	Satra Tax Plaza	Ho Chi Minh City	165	40	Not implemented yet		Empty land
16	Alpha Tower	Ho Chi Minh City	160	35	Not implemented yet		Empty land
17	Viet Capital Center	Ho Chi Minh City	160	40	2017	2018	Construction to the 5th floor
18	Seven Star T1	Hanoi	153	45	Not implemented yet		Empty land
19	BIDV Tower	Ho Chi Minh City	152	40	Not implemented yet		Empty land
20	IFI Tower	Hanoi	150	34	Not implemented yet		Empty land
21	Van Phu Victoria 4	Hanoi	145	40	2010	2013	Construction to the 9th floor
22	Văn Phú Victoria 5	Hanoi	145	40	2010	2013	Construction to the 7th floor
23	Lancaster Lincoln A	Ho Chi Minh City	144	40	2017	2018	Finish the underground part
24	Lancaster Lincoln B	Ho Chi Minh City	144	40	2017	2018	Finished the underground part
25	Dragon Riverside Residence A	Ho Chi Minh City	136	40	2017	2019	Construction to the 1st floor
26	Dragon Riverside Residence B	Ho Chi Minh City	136	40	2017	2019	Construction to the 1st floor
27	Landmark Hai Phong Viva Land A	Hải Phòng	136	40	Not implemented yet		Empty land
28	Seven Star T2	Hanoi	136	40	Not implemented yet		Empty land
29	Seven Star T3	Hanoi	136	40	Not implemented yet		Empty land
30	Seven Star T4	Hanoi	136	40	Not implemented yet		Empty land
31	Seven Star T5	Hanoi	136	40	Not implemented yet		Empty land
32	Vicem Tower	Hanoi	135	31	2011	2014	Complete the rough part
33	Golden Millennium Tower	Hanoi	133	39	2009	2017	Complete the rough part
34	Golden Square Residence	Đà Nẵng	133	39	2008	2019	Construction to the 6th floor
35	Charmington Iris - Aqua Luxury	Ho Chi Minh City	119	35	Undeveloped		Vacant land
36	Charmington Iris - Iris Luxury	Ho Chi Minh City	119	35	Undeveloped		Vacant land
37	Landmark Hai Phong Viva Land B	Hải Phòng	119	35	Undeveloped		Vacant land
38	Sky View Plaza	Hanoi	119	35	2017	2018	Construction up to the 14th floor
39	The Park Avenue A	Ho Chi Minh City	119	32	2015	2016	Construction to the 2nd floor
40	The Park Avenue B	Ho Chi Minh City	119	32	2015	2016	Construction to the 2nd floor
41	Usilk City CT3-107	Hanoi	119	35	2008	2012	Construction to the 5th floor
42	Usilk City CT4-108	Hanoi	119	35	2008	2016	Construction to the 5th floor
43	Vietsovpetro Plaza A	Vũng Tàu	112	33	2012	2015	Construction up to the 33rd floor
44	Vietsovpetro Plaza B	Vũng Tàu	112	33	2012	2015	Construction up to the 33rd floor
45	Vietsovpetro Plaza C	Vũng Tàu	112	33	2012	2015	Construction up to the 33rd floor
46	Majestic Hotel expanded	Ho Chi Minh City	110\	27	2019	2020	Finished the underground part
47	Usilk City CT3-106	Hanoi	102	30	2008	2012	Construction to the 5th floor
48	Usilk City CT4-109	Hanoi	102	30	2008	2016	Construction to the 12th floor
49	Apex Tower	Hanoi	100	27	2008	2011	Complete the rough part
50	Dragon Riverside Pháp Vân	Hanoi	100	29	2009	2012	Construction up to the 25th floor

== Tallest proposed buildings ==
This section contains a list of proposed buildings taller than 150 metres at the highest point in Vietnam.

Rank	Building	City	Floor	Height	Year* (est)
1=	Hanoi Twin Towers 99 Tower 1	Hanoi	99	569 m (1,867 ft)	2030
1=	Hanoi Twin Towers 99 Tower 2	Hanoi	99	569 m (1,867 ft)	2030
2	Smart City Financial Tower	Hanoi	108	553 m (1,814 ft)	2028
3	Domino Tower	Hạ Long Bay	99	540 m (1,772 ft)	—
4	Da Nang Downtown Tower	Da Nang	70	408 m (1,339 ft)	2030
5	Empire 88 Tower	Ho Chi Minh City	88	333 m (1,093 ft)	—
6=	SJC Tower	Ho Chi Minh City	52	200 m (660 ft)	—
6=	Cocobay Hotel Tower	Da Nang	48	200 m (660 ft)	—
6=	Cocobay Residential Tower	Da Nang	48	200 m (660 ft)	—
7	Agribank Tower	Hanoi	47	188 m (617 ft)	—
8	Saigon Panorama 2	Ho Chi Minh City	36	180 m (590 ft)	2019
9	Satra-Tax Plaza	Ho Chi Minh City	40	165 m (541 ft)	—
10	Eximbank Headquarters	Ho Chi Minh City	40	163 m (535 ft)	—
11	Lavenue Crown	Ho Chi Minh City	36	160 m (520 ft)	2021
12	BIDV Tower	Ho Chi Minh City	40	152 m (499 ft)	—

* Table entries with dashes (—) indicate that information regarding building dates of completion has not yet been released.

== Timeline of tallest buildings ==
This lists buildings that once held the title of tallest building in Vietnam.

Years as tallest	Building	Photos	Height	Floors	City
2018–present	Vincom Landmark 81		461.2 m (1,513 ft)	81	Ho Chi Minh City
2011–2018	Landmark 72		336 m (1,102 ft)	72	Hanoi
2010–2011	Bitexco Financial Tower		262.5 m (861 ft)	68	Ho Chi Minh City
1997–2010	Saigon Trade Center		160 m (520 ft)	33	Ho Chi Minh City
1996–1997	Saigon Centre 1		106 m (348 ft)	25	Ho Chi Minh City
1995	Sunwah Tower		100 m (330 ft)	21	Ho Chi Minh City
1972–1995	Osic Building (Army Bank)	Toa nha van phong- ben nghe, quan 1 tphcmvn - panoramio	60 m (200 ft)	15	Ho Chi Minh City
1895-1972	Saigon Notre-Dame Basilica		58 m (190 ft)	--	Ho Chi Minh City
1876-1895	Tân Định Church		55 m (180 ft)	--	Ho Chi Minh City
12th century-1876	Dương Long Tower		39 m (128 ft)	--	Tay son, Bình Định
784-12th century	Po Nagar tower		~23 m (75 ft)	3	Nha Trang
