= PVN Tower =

General information
- Status: Approved
- Type: Office and Apartments
- Location: Từ Liêm District, Hanoi
- Construction started: 2012
- Estimated completion: 2015
- Cost: US$600 million
- Owner: PetroVietnam

Technical details
- Floor count: 79
- Lifts/elevators: Coming soon

Design and construction
- Developer: PetroVietnam Construction Joint Stock Corporation

PVN Tower is a proposed skyscraper project that will be built in Hanoi, Vietnam. The Ocean Bank and Petrovietnam Construction Corporation publicly declared this project on May 7, 2010 in Hanoi. It will be a 102-story tower and is expected to be the tallest building in Vietnam. The estimated investment cost will be more than $ 1 billion. The tower will be used for commercial and financial activities. On March 31, 2011, Petrovietnam reclaimed they would cut the height of the tower due to economic reasons. The building is now planned to have 79 stories and is expected to be about 400 metres (1,300 ft) high.

== See also ==
- List of tallest buildings in Vietnam
