= Phước Hải (disambiguation) =

Phước Hải is a commune of Ho Chi Minh City, Vietnam. However, Phước Hải may also refer to the following defunct placenames in Vietnam:

- Phước Hải, Khánh Hòa: a ward of Nha Trang, now part of Nam Nha Trang ward
- Phước Hải, Ninh Thuận: a commune of Ninh Phước District, now part of Ninh Phước commune
