= Crazy House =

Crazy House may refer to:

- Crazy House (1928 film), an Our Gang short
- Crazy House (1930 film), a short comedy starring Benny Rubin and Polly Moran
- Crazy House (1940 film), a 1940 Andy Panda cartoon
- Crazy House (1943 film), a 1943 comedy film
- The Hang Nga guesthouse in Da Lat, Vietnam, commonly known as "the Crazy House"
- A slang term for a psychiatric hospital

== See also ==
- Crazyhouse, a chess variant
