= Đào Văn Phong =

Vietnamese footballer (born 1985)

Personal information
- Full name: Đào Văn Phong
- Date of birth: June 6, 1985 (age 41)
- Place of birth: Cam Lâm, Khánh Hòa, Vietnam
- Height: 1.72 m (5 ft 8 in)
- Position: Left back

Youth career
- 1997–2004: Khatoco Khánh Hòa

Senior career*
Years	Team	Apps	(Gls)
2005–2012	Khatoco Khánh Hòa	140	(8)
2013–2014	Vicem Hải Phòng	32	(3)
2015–2016	FLC Thanh Hóa	44	(0)
2017–2018	QNK Quảng Nam	34	(0)
2018–2019	Sanna Khánh Hòa BVN	4	(0)

International career^{‡}
2008–2015	Vietnam	11	(0)
- * Club domestic league appearances and goals as of 15 July 2018 ‡ National team caps and goals as of 6 Feb. 2013

Đào Văn Phong (born June 6, 1985, in Vietnam) is a Vietnamese footballer who is a left back for V.League 1 side Sanna Khánh Hòa BVN. He is a member of the Vietnam national football team.

== Achievements ==
=== Club ===
Quảng Nam

- V.League 1:

(gold) Winners : 2017
