= Cam Lâm district =

Cam Lâm district Huyện Cam Lâm
- District
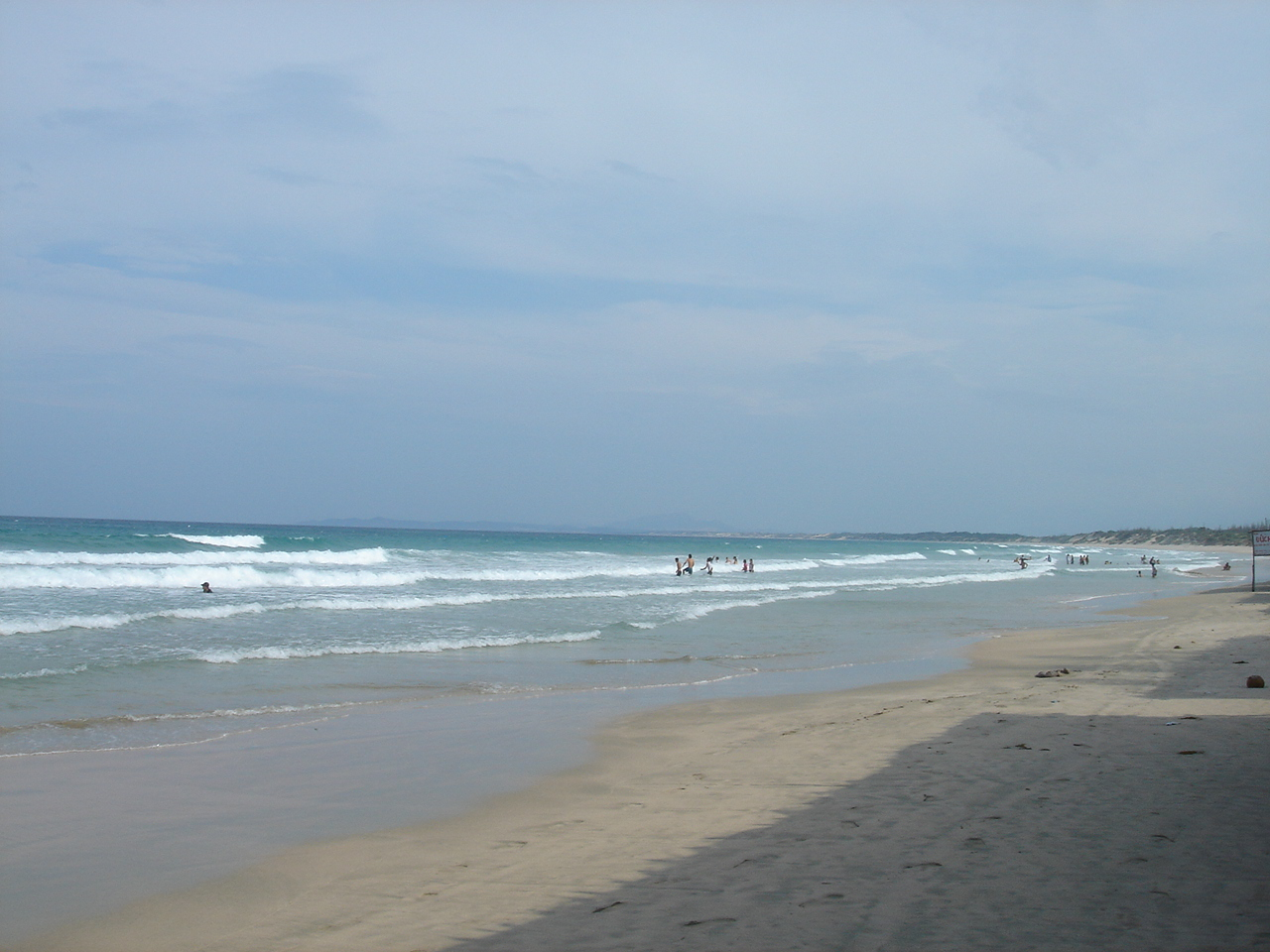
- View of Bai Dai beach
- Interactive map of Cam Lâm district
- Location within Vietnam Location within Southeast Asia Location within Asia
- Country: Vietnam
- Region: South Central Coast
- Province: Khánh Hòa
- Founded: 2007
- Capital: Cam Đức

Area
  - Total: 21,104 sq mi (54,659 km^{2})

Population (2020)
  - Total: 110.650
  - Density: 520/sq mi (202/km^{2})
- Time zone: UTC+7 (Indochina Time)
- Website: camlam.khanhhoa.gov.vn

Cam Lâm is a former district (huyện) of Khánh Hòa province in the South Central Coast region of Vietnam. Its capital is Cam Đức, which is located on the national road 1A.

== Divisions ==
In addition to the capital township, the district also encompasses the following rural communes (xã):

- Cam An Bắc
- Cam An Nam
- Cam Hải Đông
- Cam Hải Tây
- Cam Hiệp Bắc
- Cam Hiệp Nam
- Cam Hòa
- Cam Phước Tây
- Cam Tân
- Cam Thành Bắc
- Sơn Tân
- Suối Cát
- Suối Tân
