= Diamond Flower Tower =

Complex in Vietnam

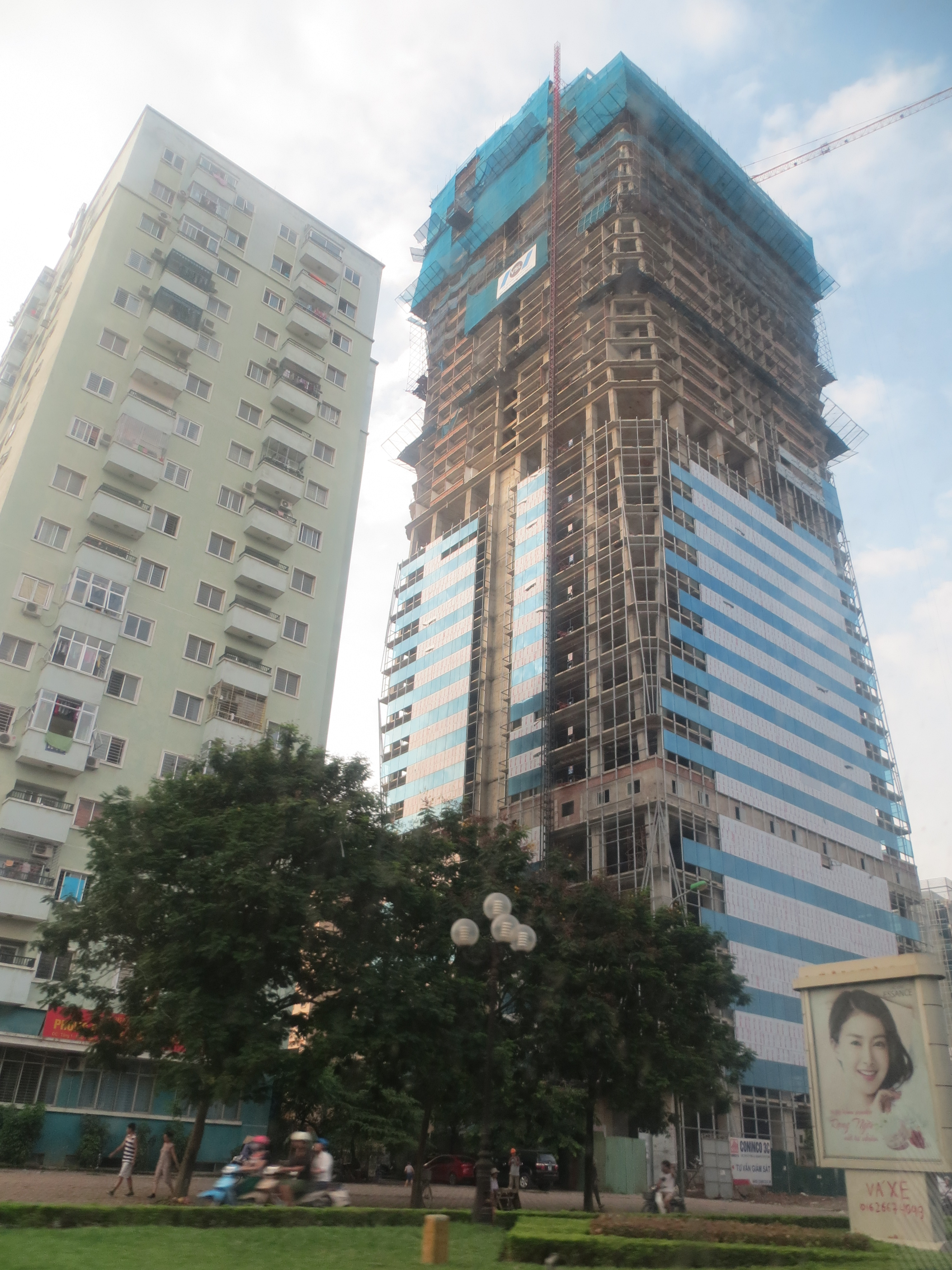
- Diamond Flower Tower under construction in 2014
- Interactive map of the Diamond Flower Tower area

General information
- Location: Lê Văn Lương Street, Nhân Chính Ward., Vietnam
- Coordinates: 21.0053187°N 105.8038908°E
- Construction started: 2011
- Opened: 2015
- Cost: VNĐ800 million

Height
- Top floor: 117 m (384 ft)

Technical details
- Floor count: 36; 3
- Floor area: 22,088 m^{2} (237,750 sq ft)

Diamond Flower Tower or Handico 6 Tower is a tall building in Hanoi, Vietnam, reaching the height of 177 m (581 ft). The building is located on Thanh Xuân in Hanoi.

== See also ==
- Saigon Trade Center
- Sunwah Tower
- List of tallest buildings in Vietnam
