= Hilton Hanoi Opera =

Hotel in Hanoi, Vietnam

Waldorf Astoria Hanoi
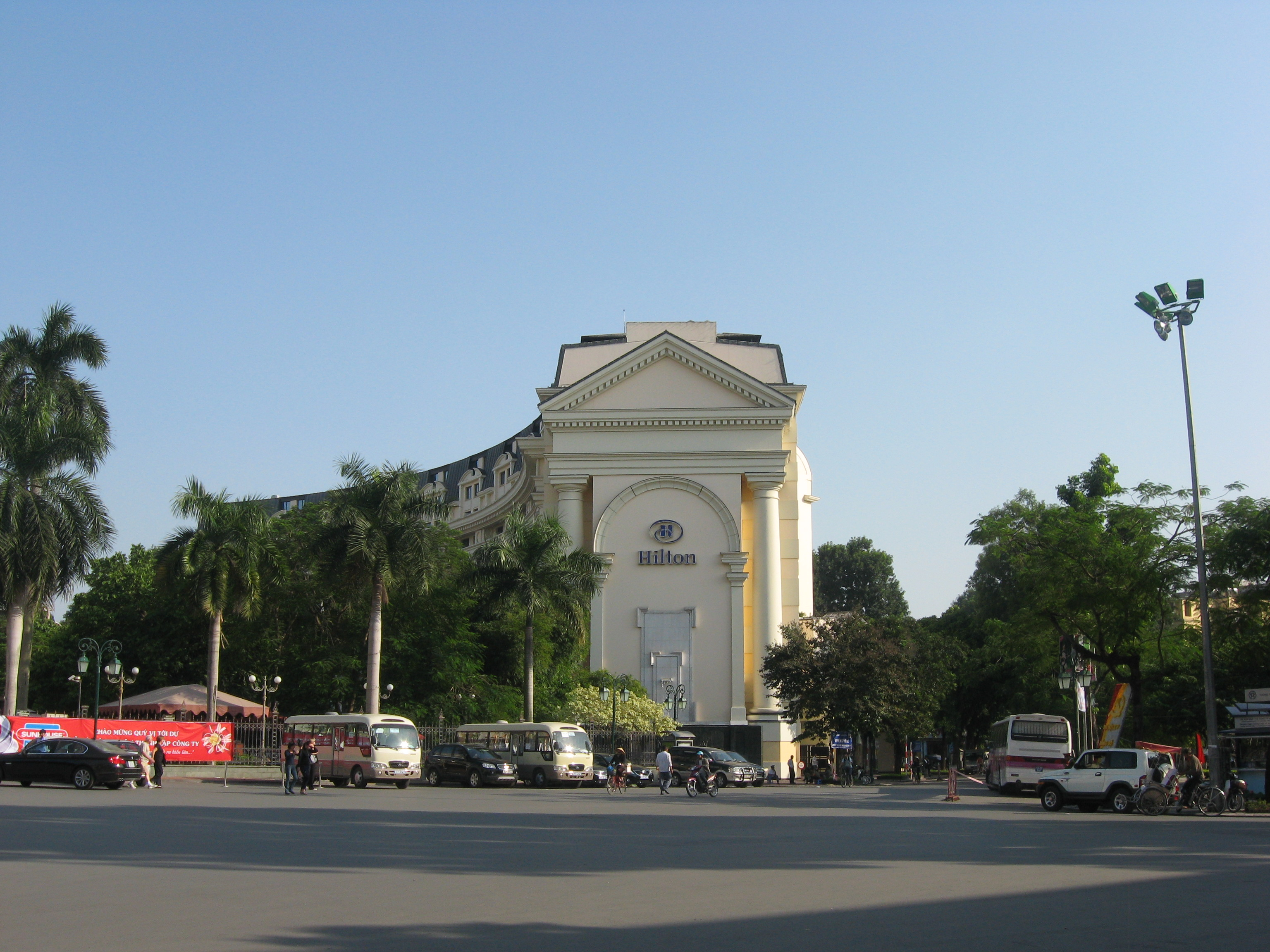
- Waldorf Astoria Hanoi before renovation
- Interactive map of the Waldorf Astoria Hanoi area
- Former names: Hilton Hanoi Opera (1999-2022)

General information
- Status: Completed
- Classification: 5 stars
- Location: August Revolution Square, No.1 Lê Thánh Tông Street, Phan Chu Trinh Ward, Hoàn Kiếm district, Hanoi, Vietnam
- Coordinates: 21.023214°N 105.857798°E
- Construction started: 1993; 33 years ago
- Completed: 1999; 27 years ago
- Inaugurated: June 1999; 26 years ago
- Renovated: December 2022; 3 years ago (as Waldorf Astoria Hanoi)
- Cost: US$63 million
- Owner: Waldorf Astoria Hotels & Resorts

Technical details
- Floor count: 7
- Floor area: 5,504 m^{2} (59,245 sq ft)

Design and construction
- Awards and prizes: Vietnam's Leading Hotel (2004-2008)

Other information
- Number of rooms: 269 (1999-2022); 187 (since 2025)

The Hilton Hanoi Opera Hotel is a hotel located at the corner of Lê Thánh Tông - Tràng Tiền street, central Hanoi, in the historic French Quarter. It opened in 1999. The World Travel Awards deemed it Vietnam’s Leading Hotel for five consecutive years from 2004 to 2008. It features accommodations such as an outdoor swimming pool with view of the Opera House with the square surround it, gym, spa and sauna, Vietnamese cuisine, cabaret, jazz music, ballroom, and function rooms. The hotel closed on December 1, 2022 for major renovations and conversion to the Waldorf Astoria Hanoi.

== Trivia ==
The nearby Hỏa Lò Prison was a Vietnamese prisoner of war camp morbidly called the "Hanoi Hilton" by Americans captured during the Vietnam War. The camp held American soldiers from 1964 until 1973.
