= Cam An =

- Rural commune
- Location in Vietnam
- Coordinates: 11.9905°N 109.0416°E
- Country: Vietnam
- Province: Khánh Hòa
- Founded: 1985

Area
  - Total: 3,354 sq mi (8,686 km^{2})

Population (1999)
  - Total: 6,222
  - Density: 190/sq mi (72/km^{2})
- Time zone: UTC+07:00 (Indochina Time)

Cam An is a rural commune (xã) of Khánh Hòa Province, Vietnam.

== Geography ==
Cam Phước Tây has a metropolitan area of 8,686 km^{2} (3,354 sq mi) and a population of about 6,222.
