= Văn Giang =

Commune in Hưng Yên province, Vietnam

Văn Giang Xã Văn Giang
- Commune
- Văn Giang commune
- Location within Vietnam
- Coordinates: 20°56′26″N 105°55′54″E
- Country: Vietnam
- Region: Red River Delta
- Province: Hưng Yên
- Time zone: UTC+7 (UTC + 7)

Văn Giang is a commune (xã) in Hưng Yên province, Vietnam.. The name comes from Van Giang district and Van Giang town.
