= InterContinental Nha Trang =

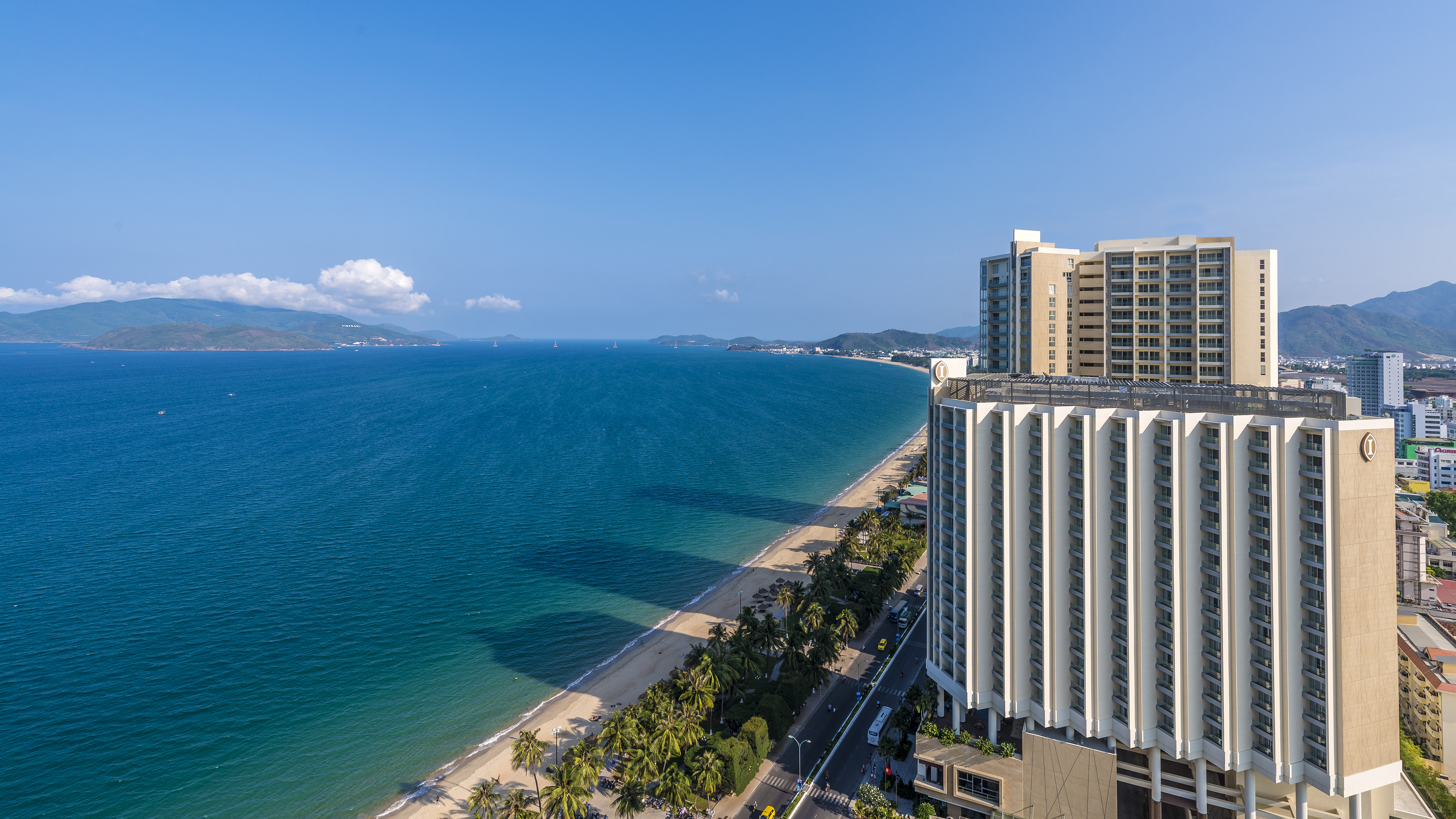
- InterContinental Nha Trang
- Interactive map of the InterContinental Nha Trang area

General information
- Location: Nha Trang, Khánh Hòa, Vietnam
- Coordinates: 12°14′41.99″N 109°11′46.36″E
- Opening: April 2014
- Owner: TD Corporation

Technical details
- Floor count: 18

Other information
- Number of rooms: 277
- Number of suites: 56
- Number of restaurants: 1

The InterContinental Nha Trang is a beachfront hotel in Nha Trang, located between the Sheraton Nha Trang and the Havana hotel Nha Trang. Originally designed as a Crowne Plaza, the hotel underwent re-branding in 2013 and is now upgraded to an InterContinental hotel. The hotel opened on March 17, 2014.

== Location ==
InterContinental Nha Trang is located in the center of beach front Tran Phu street. The hotel is part of The Costa residence complex, which belong to the same Vietnamese owner - TD Corporation.

== Facilities ==
InterContinental Nha Trang was designed by the Singaporean architect Tan Hock Beng, who also worked on the W Retreat Koh Samui. Accommodation includes 277 guest rooms, 56 of which are suites.

== See also ==
- List of tallest buildings in Khánh Hòa province
