= Bắc Nha Trang =

Bắc Nha Trang Phường Bắc Nha Trang Vĩnh Xương
- Ward
- Interactive map of Bắc Nha Trang
- Coordinates: 12°16′53″N 109°11′23″E
- Country: Vietnam
- Province: Khánh Hòa province
- Established: June 16, 2025

Area
  - Total: 37.47 sq mi (97.04 km^{2})

Population (2024)
  - Total: 128,239
  - Density: 3,423/sq mi (1,322/km^{2})
- Time zone: UTC+07:00 (Indochina Time)
- Administrative code: 22333

Bắc Nha Trang (Vietnamese: Phường Bắc Nha Trang, lit. 'North Nha Trang') is a ward of Khánh Hòa province, Vietnam. It is one of the 65 new wards, communes and special zones of the province following the reorganization in 2025.

== History ==
On June 16, 2025, the National Assembly Standing Committee issued Resolution No. 1667/NQ-UBTVQH15 on the arrangement of commune-level administrative units of Khánh Hòa province in 2025 (effective from June 16, 2025). Accordingly, the entire land area and population of Vĩnh Hòa, Vĩnh Hải, Vĩnh Phước, Vĩnh Thọ wards and Vĩnh Lương, Vĩnh Phương communes of the former Nha Trang city will be integrated into a new ward named Bắc Nha Trang (Clause 50, Article 1).
