= Sơn Trà district =

Coordinates: 16°06′58″N 108°16′37″E

Sơn Trà district Quận Sơn Trà District III(Quận III)
- Urban district
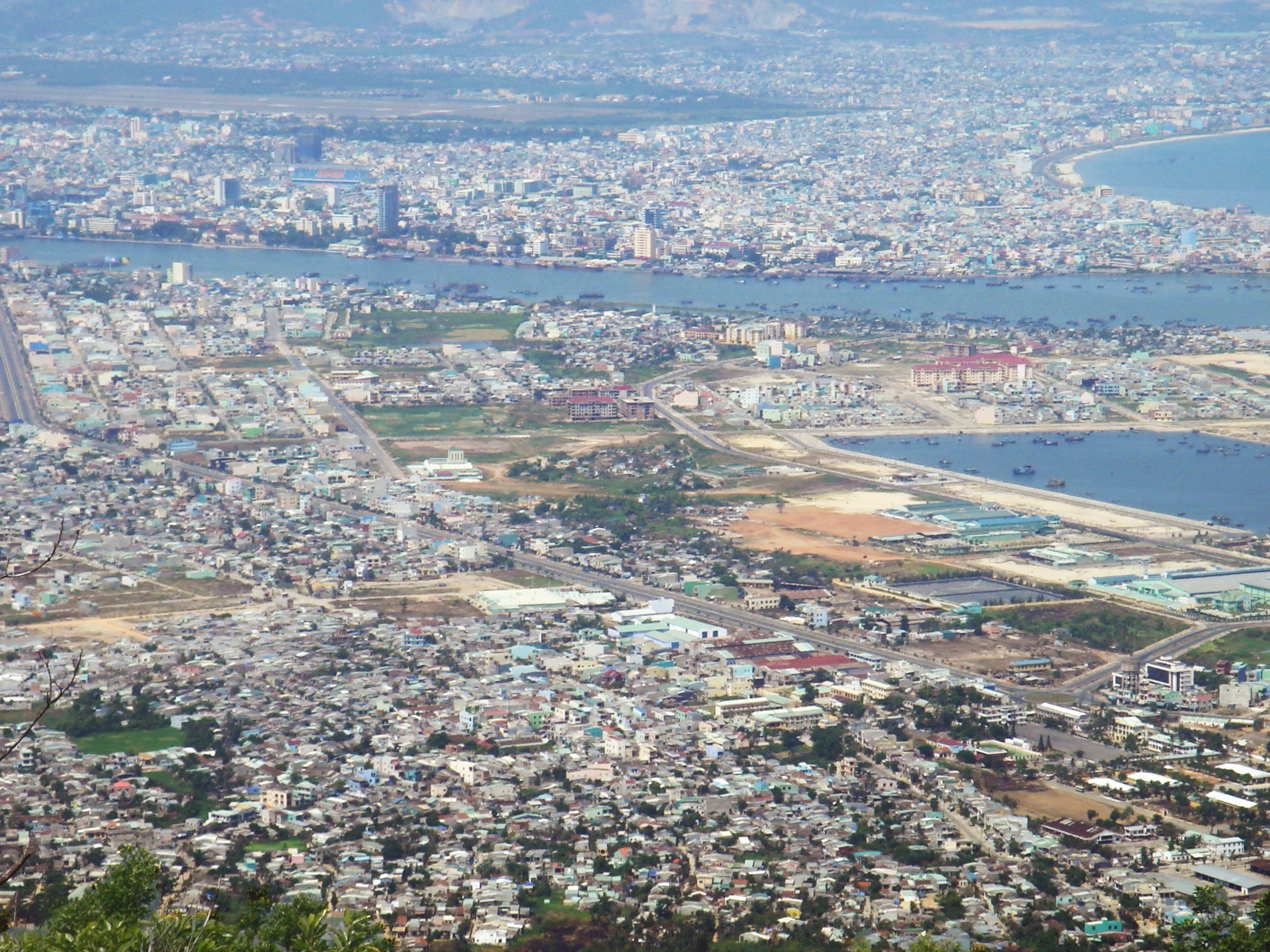

- Seal

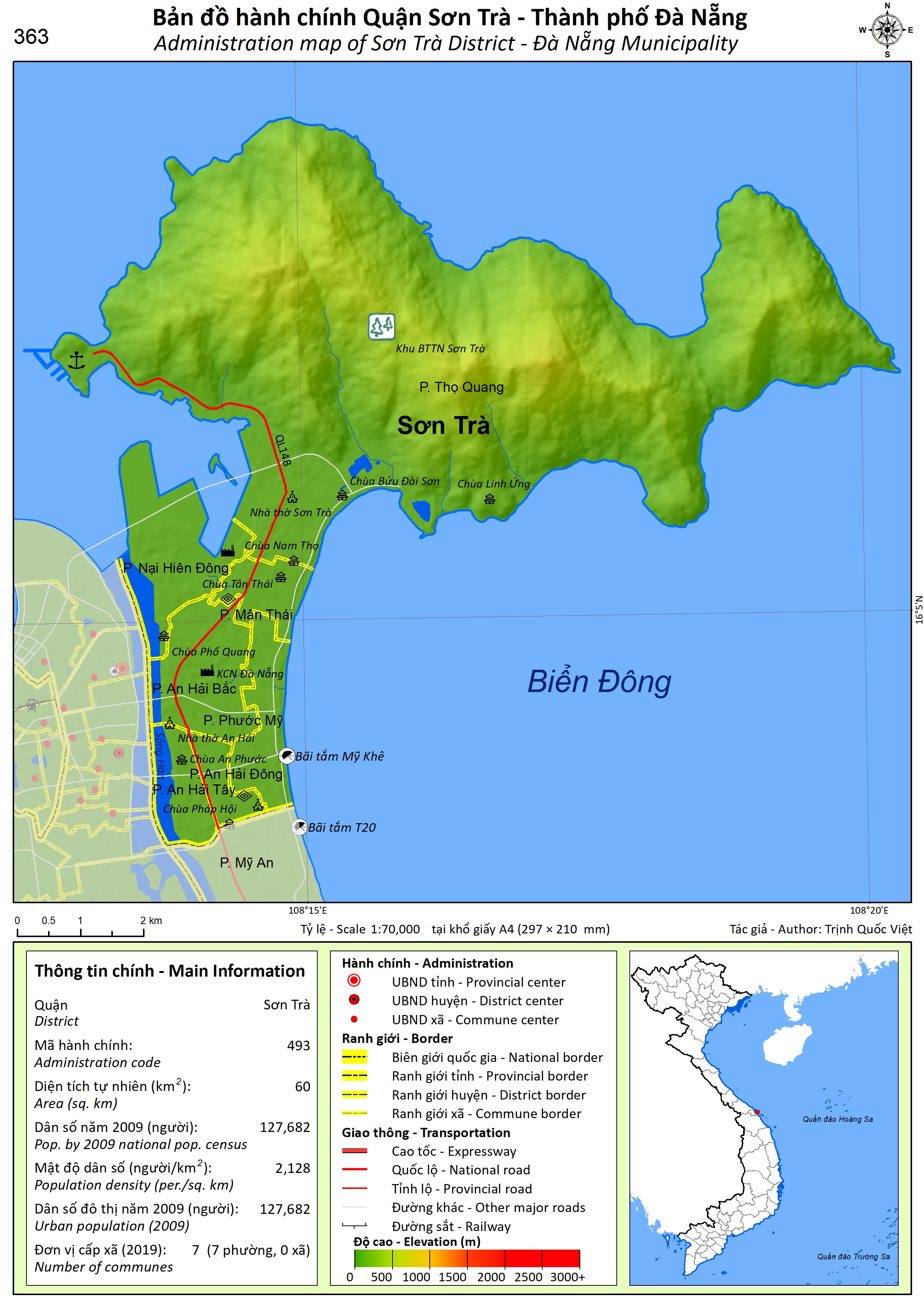
- Administration map of the district in Da Nang
- Country: Vietnam
- Region: South Central Coast
- Municipality: Da Nang
- Capital: An Hai Tay

Area
  - Total: 23 sq mi (60 km^{2})

Population (2018)
  - Total: 173,455
- Time zone: UTC+7 (Indochina Time)

Sơn Trà was a former urban district (quận) of Da Nang in the South Central Coast region of Vietnam. As of 2003 the district had a population of 112,196. The district covers an area of 60 km^{2} (23 sq mi). The district is bounded by ocean to the north and east, the Hàn River to the west, and Ngũ Hành Sơn district to the south. Sơn Trà Mountain occupies a large portion of the district.

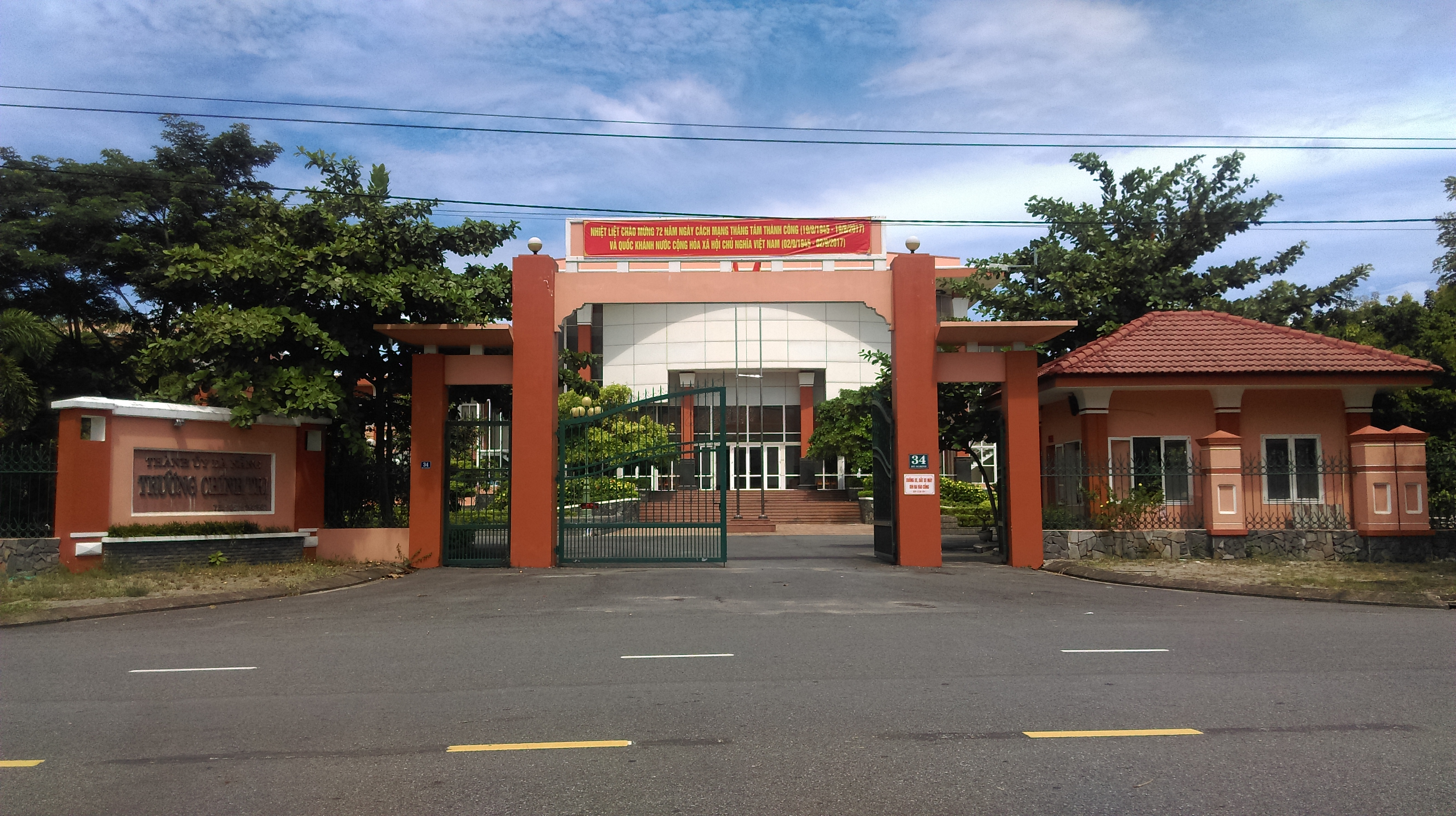
Đà Nẵng Political School

The district was divided into 7 wards (phường):

- An Hải Bắc
- An Hải Đông
- An Hải Tây
- Mân Thái
- Nại Hiên Đông
- Phước Mỹ
- Thọ Quang

The district capital lay at An Hải Tây ward.

After the 2025 Vietnamese administrative reforms, the district was split into Sơn Trà ward and An Hải ward.
