= Hằng Nga Guesthouse =

Vietnamese guesthouse

Coordinates: 11°56′5.04″N 108°25′50.29″E

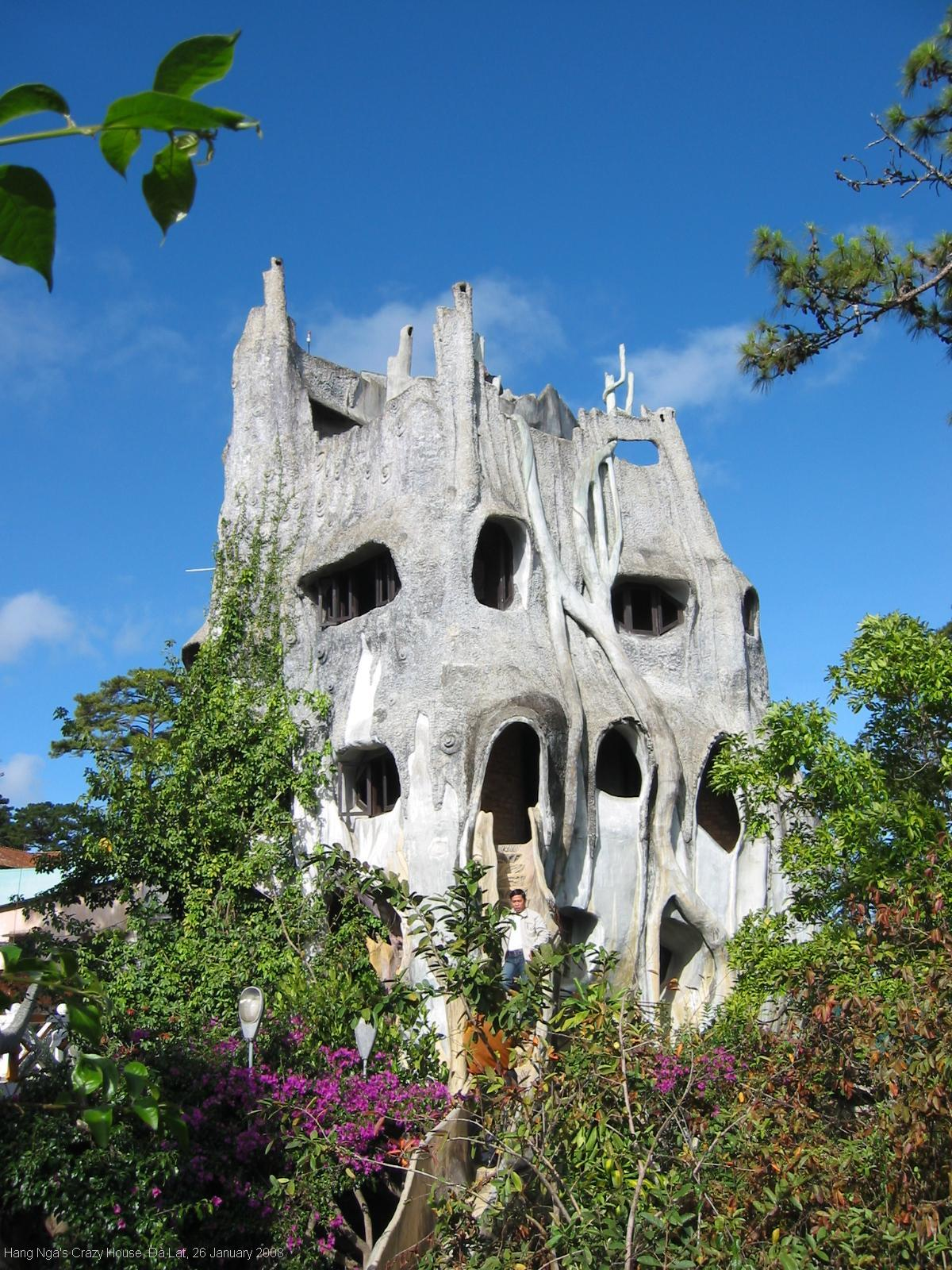
The exterior of Hằng Nga guesthouse

Hằng Nga guesthouse (Vietnamese: Biệt thự Hằng Nga), popularly known as the “Crazy House” (Vietnamese: Ngôi nhà quái dị), is an unconventional building designed and constructed by Vietnamese architect Đặng Việt Nga in Đà Lạt, Vietnam.

Described as a “fairy tale house” (Hằng Nga, chữ Hán: 姮娥, is the Chinese goddess of the Moon), the building's overall design resembles a giant tree, incorporating sculptured design elements representing natural forms such as animals, mushrooms, spider webs and caves. Its architecture, comprising complex, organic, non-rectilinear shapes, has been described as expressionist. Nga has acknowledged the inspiration of Catalan architect Antoni Gaudí in the building's design, and visitors have variously drawn parallels between it and the works of artists such as Salvador Dalí and Walt Disney. Since its opening in 1990, the building has gained recognition for its unique architecture, being highlighted in numerous guidebooks and listed as one of the world's ten most “bizarre” buildings in the Chinese People's Daily.

== Design ==
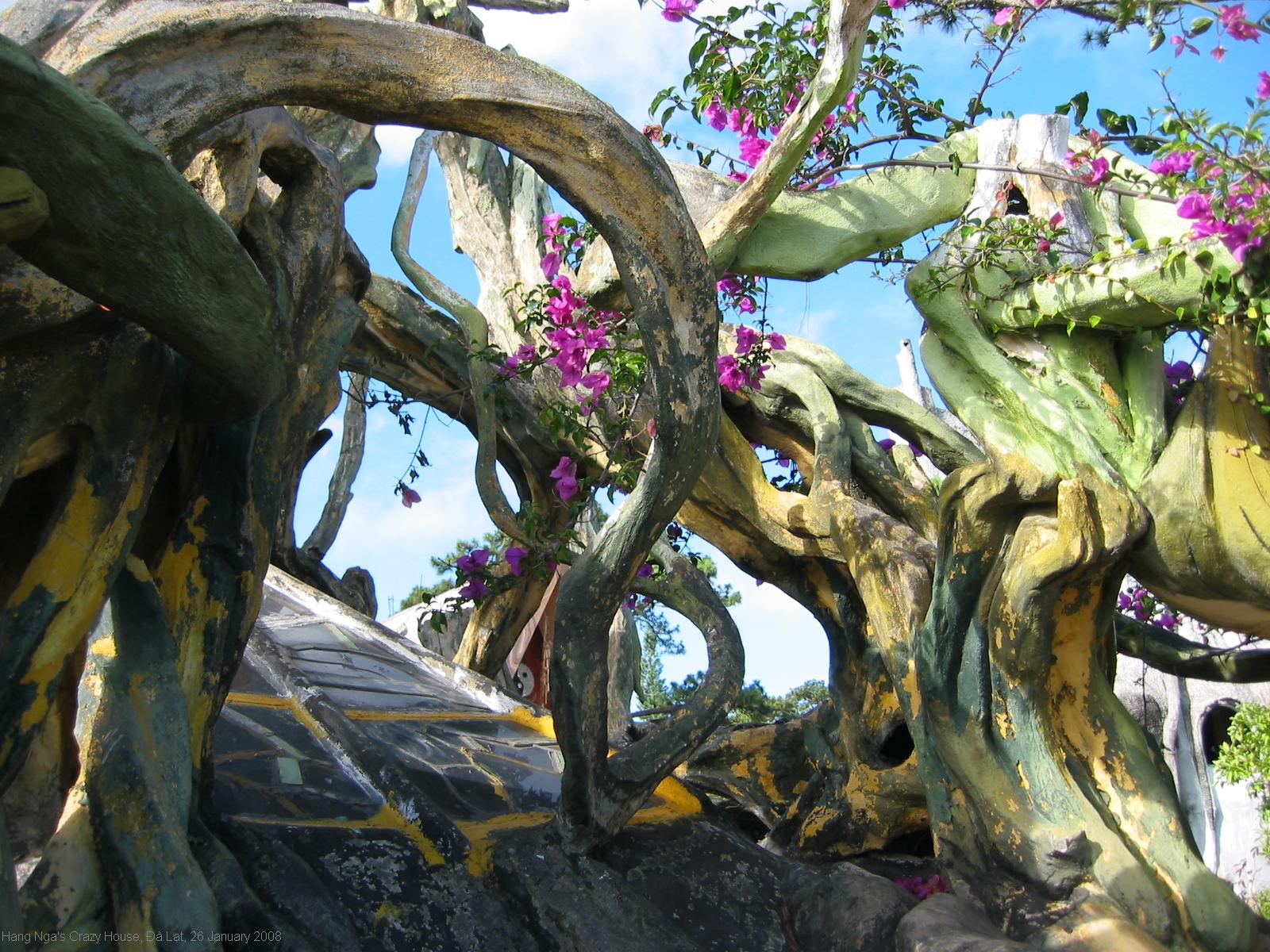
The guesthouse's exterior is decorated with twisting organic forms.

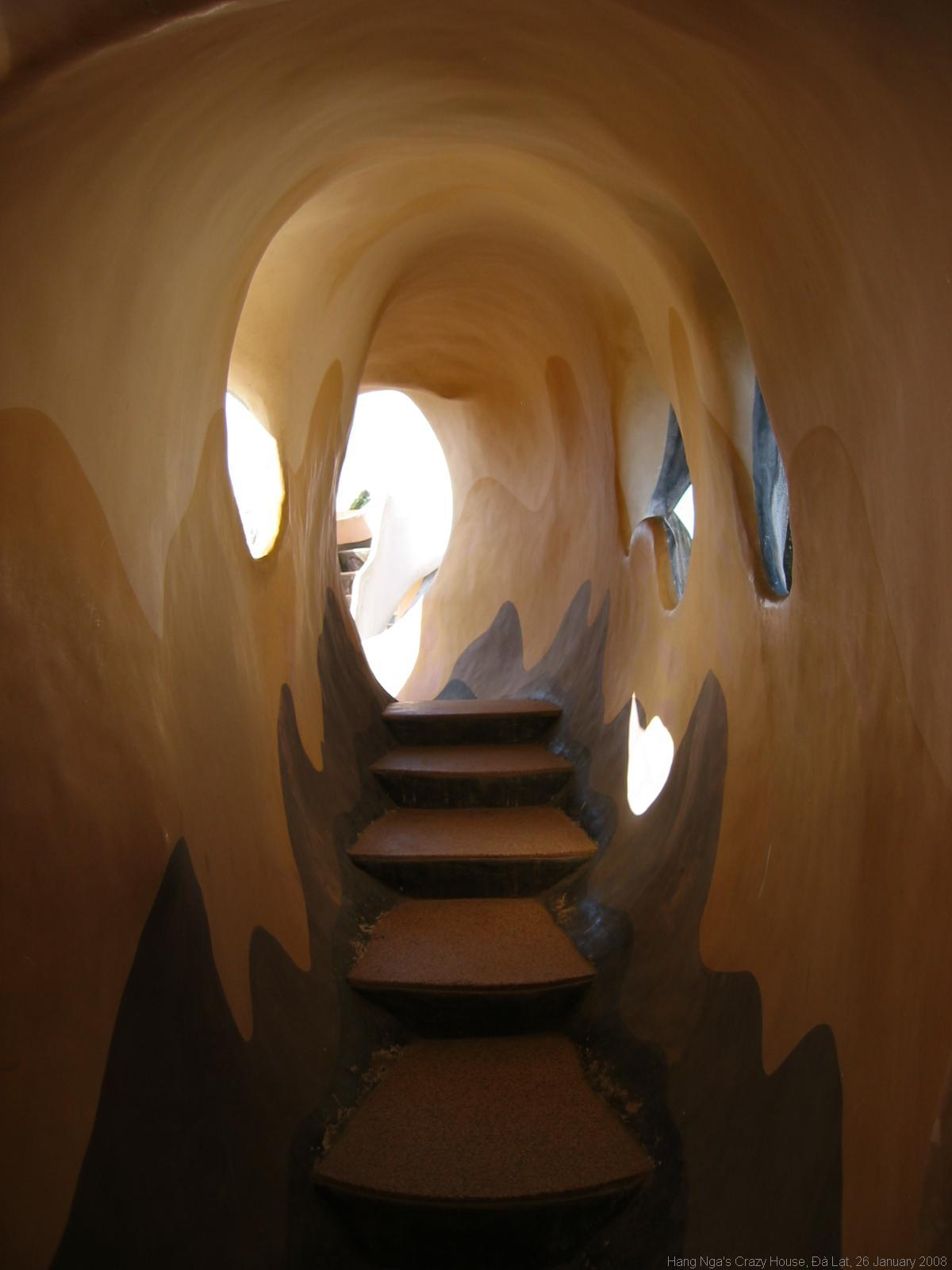
A cave-shaped stairway.

Hang Nga guesthouse was originally built as a personal project by Vietnamese architect Dang Viet Nga, opening to the public in 1990. Nga, daughter of Trường Chinh, who received a PhD in architecture from the University of Moscow, has stated that her overall design was inspired by the natural environment surrounding of the city of Da Lat, along with the work of Catalan architect Antoni Gaudí.

=== Architecture ===
Rather than using standard architectural plans as blueprints, Nga produces paintings, and hires non-professional local craftsmen to transform these into structural elements. Few right angles are found throughout the building, which instead boasts a complex organic structure echoing natural forms. The building's exterior resembles a five-story-high banyan tree, with unevenly shaped window openings and branch-like structures that "grow" along its walls and rise above the roof into the sky. Describing it as a "fairy tale house", observers have variously drawn comparisons between the building's architecture and the works of Salvador Dalí and Walt Disney. In attempting to classify the building's architecture, the People's Committee of the city of Đà Lạt described it as “expressionist”.

=== Interior design ===
The guesthouse has ten themed guest rooms, each one having an animal as its theme; examples include the tiger room, the eagle room, the ant room and the kangaroo room, each with decorations matching the theme. The walls of the tiger room, for instance, feature a large tiger with glowing red eyes; the kangaroo room incorporates a sculpted kangaroo with a fireplace in its belly; the fireplace in the eagle room is in the form of a giant eagle's egg. Many of the rooms incorporate an added level of symbolism, with the animal theme connected to a particular nationality. For instance, Nga describes the tiger room as representing “the strengths of the Chinese”; the eagle room as being “big and strong” like Americans; and the ant room as representing the “hard working Vietnamese”.

Furniture inside the rooms is handcrafted—and sometimes even built into the rooms themselves—to match the rooms’ nonlinear, organic shape. Stone decorations throughout the house depict animals such as bears, giraffes, frogs, spiders and ants, along with natural elements such as mushrooms and spider webs. Stairways and hallways inside the building are designed to resemble tunnels and caves.

== Tourism use ==
To help alleviate the financial burden associated with what was essentially a personal project—having accumulated upwards of VND 30 million in debt—Nga expanded the building into a guesthouse, and opened the house to paid visits by tourists in late 1990. Current fees for visits to the guesthouse are VND 60,000 (2020 Jan) per visit; room rates ranged from VND 290,000 to 630,000 per room per night for Vietnamese, and from $29–63 for foreigners.

== Reception ==
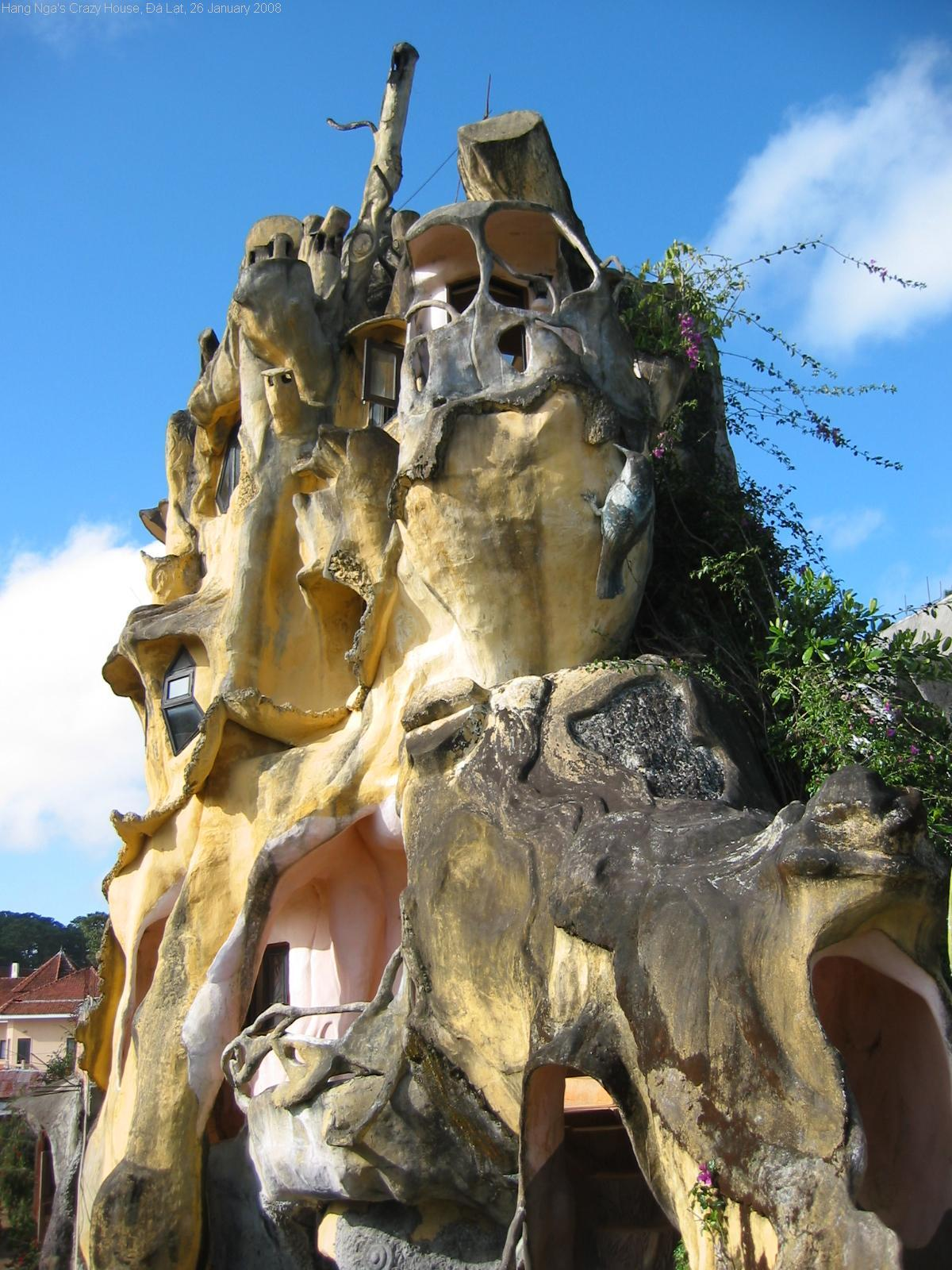
Reactions to the guesthouse's unique architecture have been mixed.

The five-storey-high guesthouse has generated a great deal of attention and controversy since its inception, with reactions ranging from criticism and derision to open admiration. The house was dubbed the "Crazy House" by early visitors, a name which Dang soon adopted for the house herself.

Visitors have generally responded positively to the house, describing it as "brave", "brilliant", "quintessentially cosmic", and lauding Nga for her vision and dedication to her work. One French tourist commented as follows:

Thanks for showing me the meaning of life. The fairy tale house took me back to my childhood, to when things were pure and natural.

Local authorities, including the People's Committee of the city of Da Lat, opposed Nga's work on the house for many years, rejecting her proposals while citing concerns about its ad-hoc character, its lack of formal aesthetic and its structural integrity. With perseverance—and private funding from friends and family—Dang was nevertheless able to further develop and refine the house, and was eventually able to convince the national government in Hanoi to endorse her work, allowing her to continue building without restrictions.

The building has been highlighted in numerous travel guidebooks: the third edition of Frommer's Vietnam, for example, called the guesthouse "an interesting, evolving piece of pop art", and "a fun visit". In 2009, the building was listed by the Chinese People’s Daily as one of the world's ten most “bizarre” buildings.

== Notes and references ==
Notes

Bibliography

- Lonely Planet Vietnam, (Lonely Planet, 2007), ISBN 1-74104-306-9, pp. 309–311.
