= Cam Lâm =

- Commune
- Location in Vietnam
- Coordinates: 12°29′N 108°55′E
- Country: Vietnam
- Province: Khánh Hòa
- Founded: 2007

Area
  - Total: 6.80 sq mi (17.62 km^{2})

Population (2020)
  - Total: 17,177
  - Density: 2,520/sq mi (974/km^{2})
- Time zone: UTC+07:00 (Indochina Time)

Cam Lâm is a commune (xã), of Khánh Hòa Province, Vietnam. It is one of the 65 new wards, communes and special zones of the province following the reorganization in 2025.

On June 16, 2025, the Standing Committee of the National Assembly issued Resolution No. 1667/NQ-UBTVQH15 on the arrangement of commune-level administrative units in Khánh Hòa province in 2025. Accordingly, Cam Đức Township, Cam Hải Đông Commune, Cam Hải Tây Commune, Cam Thành Bắc Commune, and parts of Cam Hiệp Bắc Commune, Cam Hiệp Nam Commune, Cam Hòa Commune, Cam Tân Commune, Cam An Bắc Commune, Cam An Nam Commune, and Suối Tân Commune were merged to form Cam Lâm Commune.
