= Pink Church =

Pink Church may refer to:

- Tân Định Church, Ho Chi Minh City, Vietnam
- Domaine de Marie, Da Lat, Vietnam
- Da Nang Cathedral, Diocese of Đà Nẵng, Vietnam
