= Battle of Da Lat =

Tet Offensive battle of the Vietnam War

Battle of Đà Lạt
- Part of the Tet Offensive of the Vietnam War
Date	31 January – 11 February, 1968
Location	Đà Lạt, Tuyên Đức Province, South Vietnam
Result	South Vietnamese-American victory

Belligerents
South Vietnam; United States	Viet Cong; North Vietnam

Units involved
(South Vietnam) II Corps: ARVN Regional Forces; Two RF companies; ARVN Rangers; 23rd Battalion; 11th Battalion; (United States) 981st USAMPC Co.	(Viet Cong) 145th Battalion (Viet Cong) 186th Battalion

Casualties and losses
At least 2 MPs wounded Unknown killed	200+ killed

The Battle of Da Lat began on 31 January, 1968, as part of the Tet Offensive, launched by North Vietnam and the Viet Cong against South Vietnam to coincide with the Lunar New Year. On the morning of 31 January, Viet Cong forces attacked and took control of the city. After a protracted battle that was estimated to have left around 200 Viet Cong dead, South Vietnamese and American forces regained control of Da Lat on 11 February.

== Planning ==
Along with Phan Thiet, Da Lat was one of two regional centres in II Corps that were to be taken over. An official post-war communist history acknowledged that the attack and the Tet Offensive as a whole were premature, noting "they had been given only enough time to prepare an ordinary campaign, and the conditions were not yet ripe... They could not be sure of achieving these goals, especially the capture of Dalat." It further said that their "thinking, planning, and organization was still at a simple level, while there were many things that could not be done in time." Finally, the timing of the attack was the subject of confusion because of a misunderstanding about the lunar calendar.

== Battle ==
The Viet Cong attacked Da Lat at 1:00 am on 31 January, and cut off the roads and communications into the city. The US Military Police compound was levelled by mortar and rocket fire, wounding two MPs. A reaction force was sent to evacuate all MPs from their accommodation to a medical villa. The Viet Cong would attack the medical villa continuously with mortars. On 3 February 1968, a few US Military Police returned to the original compound under enemy fire to retrieve equipment, taking records, vehicles, and radios that had been left behind on 31 January, without sustaining further casualties. The battle then shifted onto Cam Ly Airfield, where US Military Police supported ARVN in an attempt to dislodge the Viet Cong. The Vietnamese National Military Academy, the foremost ARVN military school in South Vietnam, was also attacked during the battle. At some point during the battle, ARVN and US Military Police would start running out of ammunition, which had to be replenished via airdrop. With further reinforcements from the 23rd ARVN Ranger Battalion arriving on 5 February 1968, the remaining Viet Cong were repelled, and retreated to fortified positions within the Pasteur Institute, a prominent biomedical research institute in Da Lat which had been temporarily seized by the Viet Cong. By 11 February 1968, all Viet Cong were either killed, surrendered, or had withdrawn, and Da Lat was declared secure. Around 200 Viet Cong were killed. South Vietnamese and American forces sustained minimal casualties.
