= Da Lat Market =

Night market

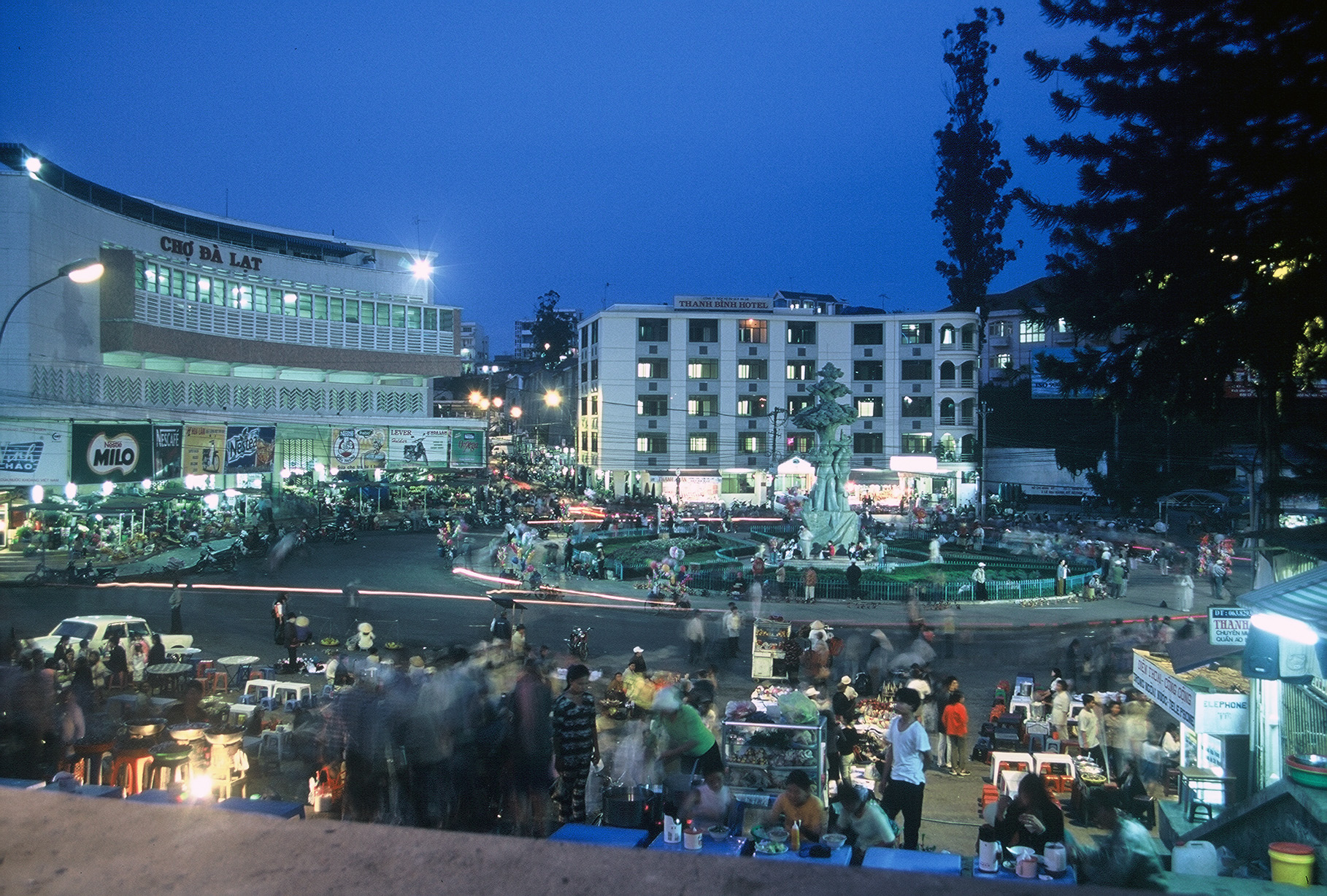
- Location: Nguyễn Thị Minh Khai Street, Xuân Hương – Đà Lạt, Lâm Đồng province; Da Lat, Vietnam; 11.941550°N 108.437214°E
- Environment: Urban
- Total retail floor area: 13,056 m^{2} (140,530 sq ft)
- Interactive map of Da Lat Market

Da Lat Market (Vietnamese: Chợ Đà Lạt) is a commercial and cultural center in the city of Da Lat, Vietnam.

== History ==
In the early 20th century, migration to mountains of Da Lat was slowly increasing from the Central region of Vietnam. By 1929, the town population surpassed 2,000 residents. A missionary built an open market with the lumber from surrounding forests, which would be colloquially called the Chợ Cây (Vietnamese for 'Tree Market') By 1960, a more stable, two-story market "Chợ Đà Lạt" was built in a valley next to its original location to safely replace Chợ Cây. In 1993, an adjacent second block was constructed that would considerably expand the market. In 2010, "Block C" went into construction which would add 5,000m² to the Da Lat Market complex. Although the structure stood as the most prominent in the city for decades, the rapid development of Dalat as a tourist destination as well as a point of commerce soon made the market one of the smallest in a neighborhood of high-rise hotels. In 2017, plans were announced for the Hoa Binh Center project that would restructure the entire city center in way that would frame the market as a cultural landmark and ultimately attempt to position the city of Dalat as a point for international tourism.

== Description ==
The market sits on Nguyen Thi Minh Khai Street and is split into three areas. The first area includes the oldest building facing the roundabout at the city's center and focuses on food and the two more recently built buildings in the back focus on clothing, art, and housewares. The primary building serves as an open market for local residents to buy produce, spices, and meats as well as a space for merchants to market goods towards tourists.

=== Night Market ===
In 2013, the city began formally organizing a night market as vendors had already informally begun to gather on the streets of Cho Da Lat after hours to sells street food and gifts to pedestrians. By 2017, there were concerns the safety of the night market and a lack of management, with scuffles breaking out between vendors and customers as well as sanitation issues. There were also issues with pickpockets.

== Gallery ==
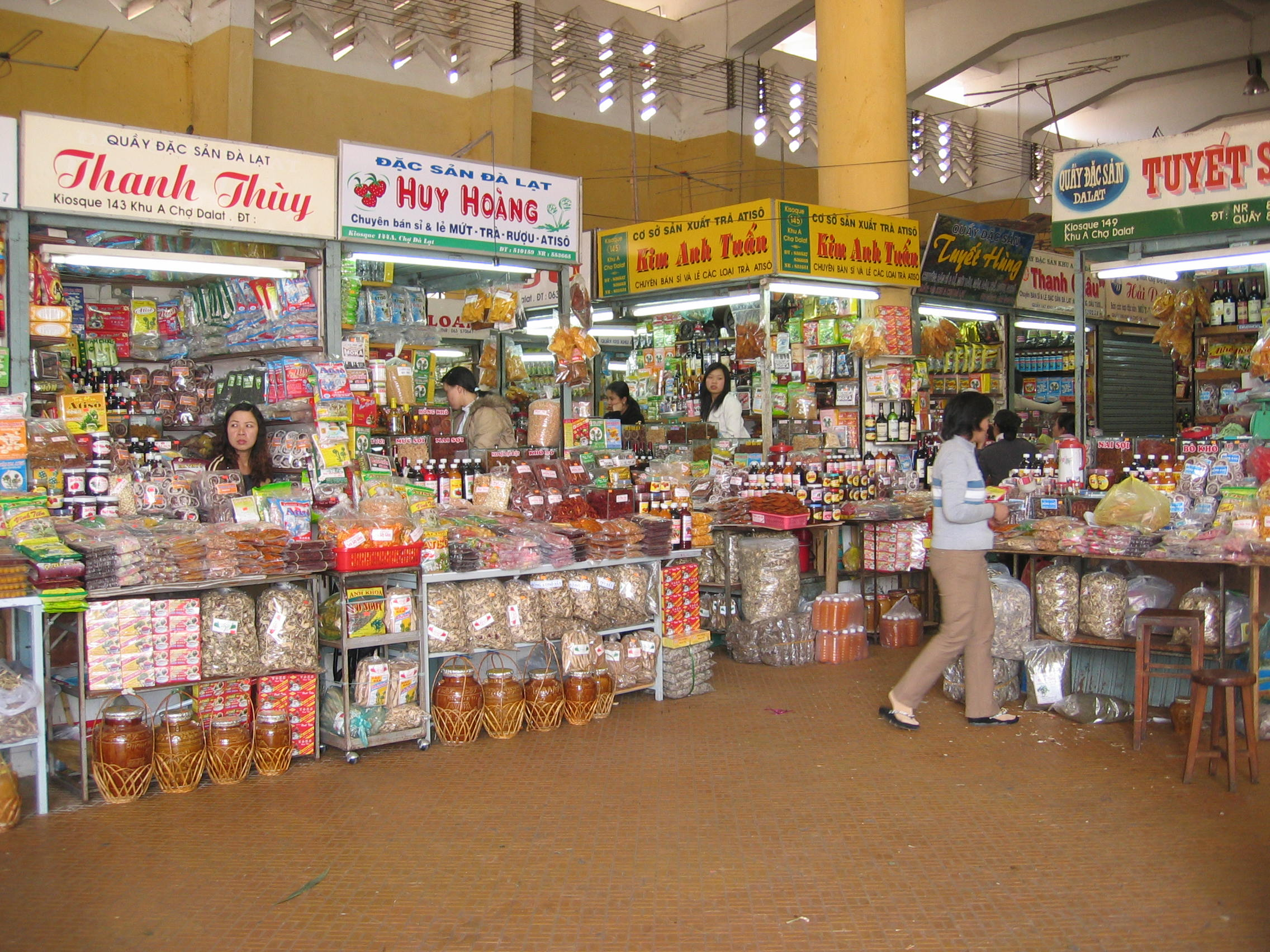
Inside the market

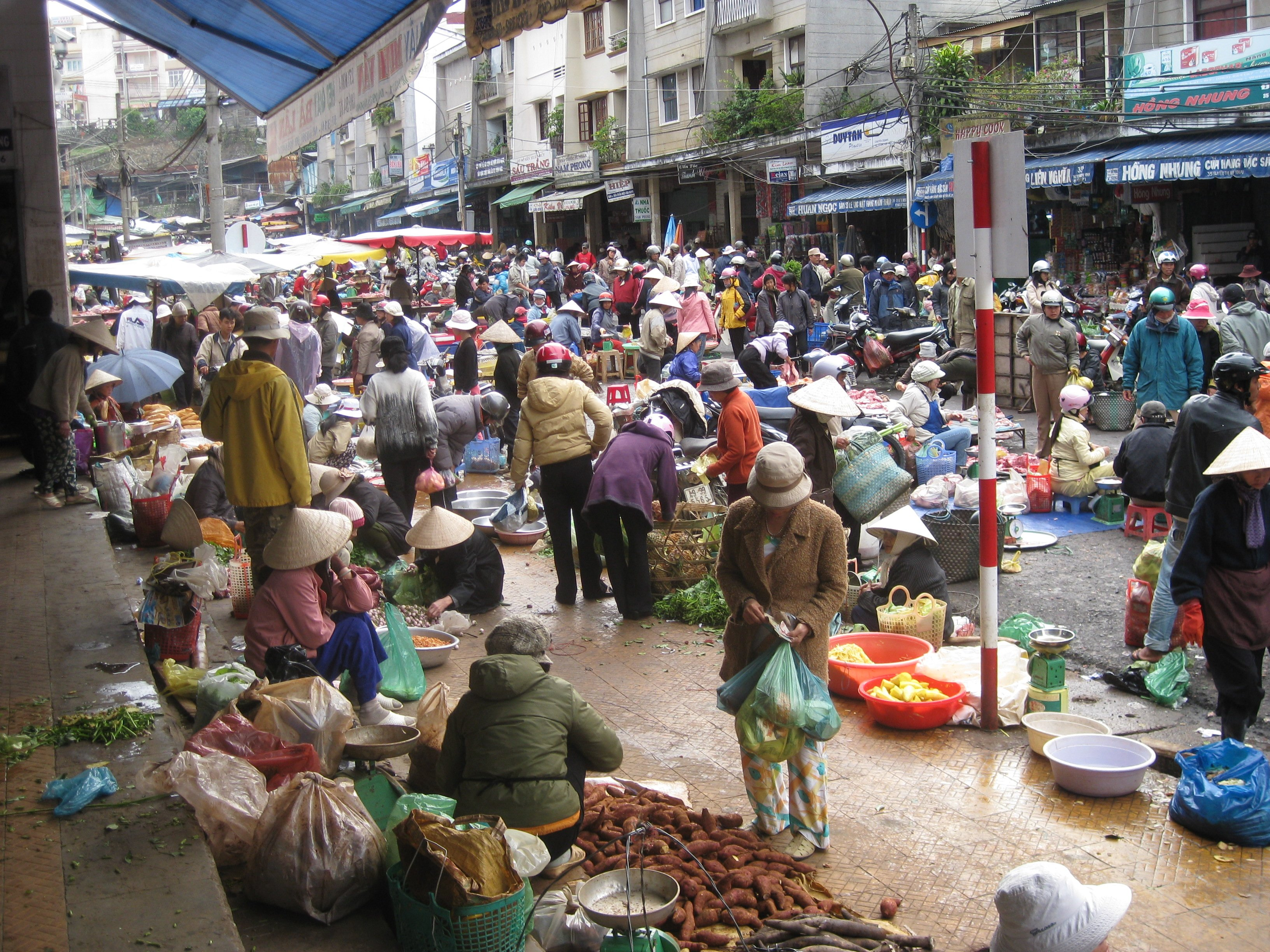
Outside of the streets of the market in the morning

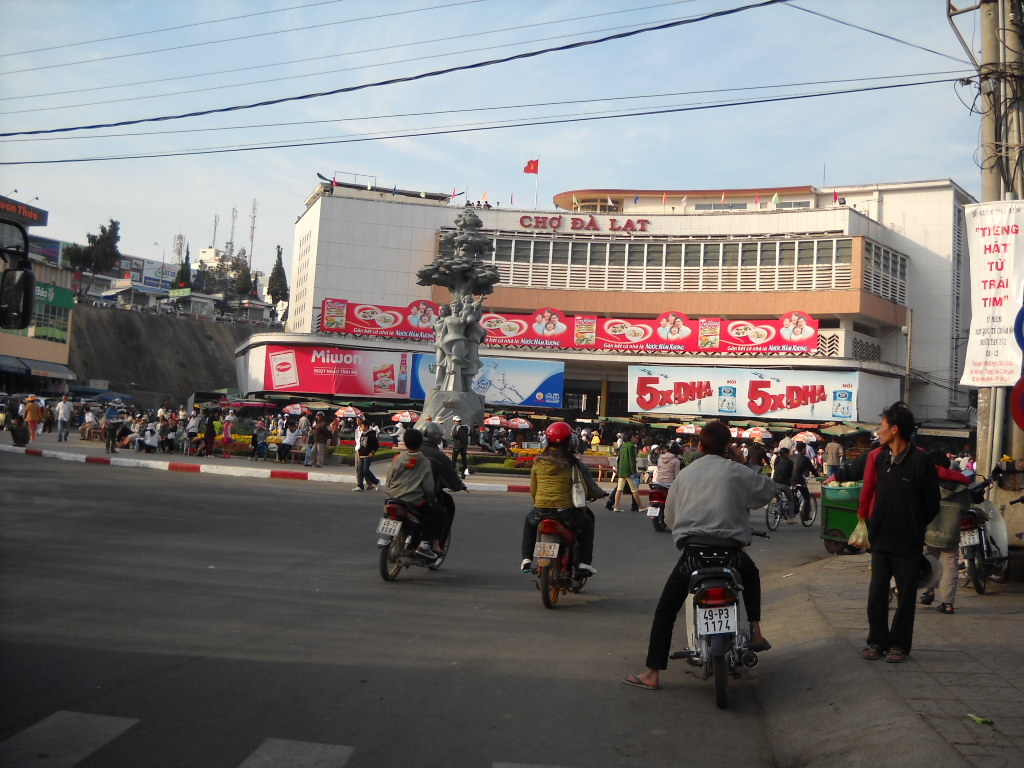
The roundabout in front of the market

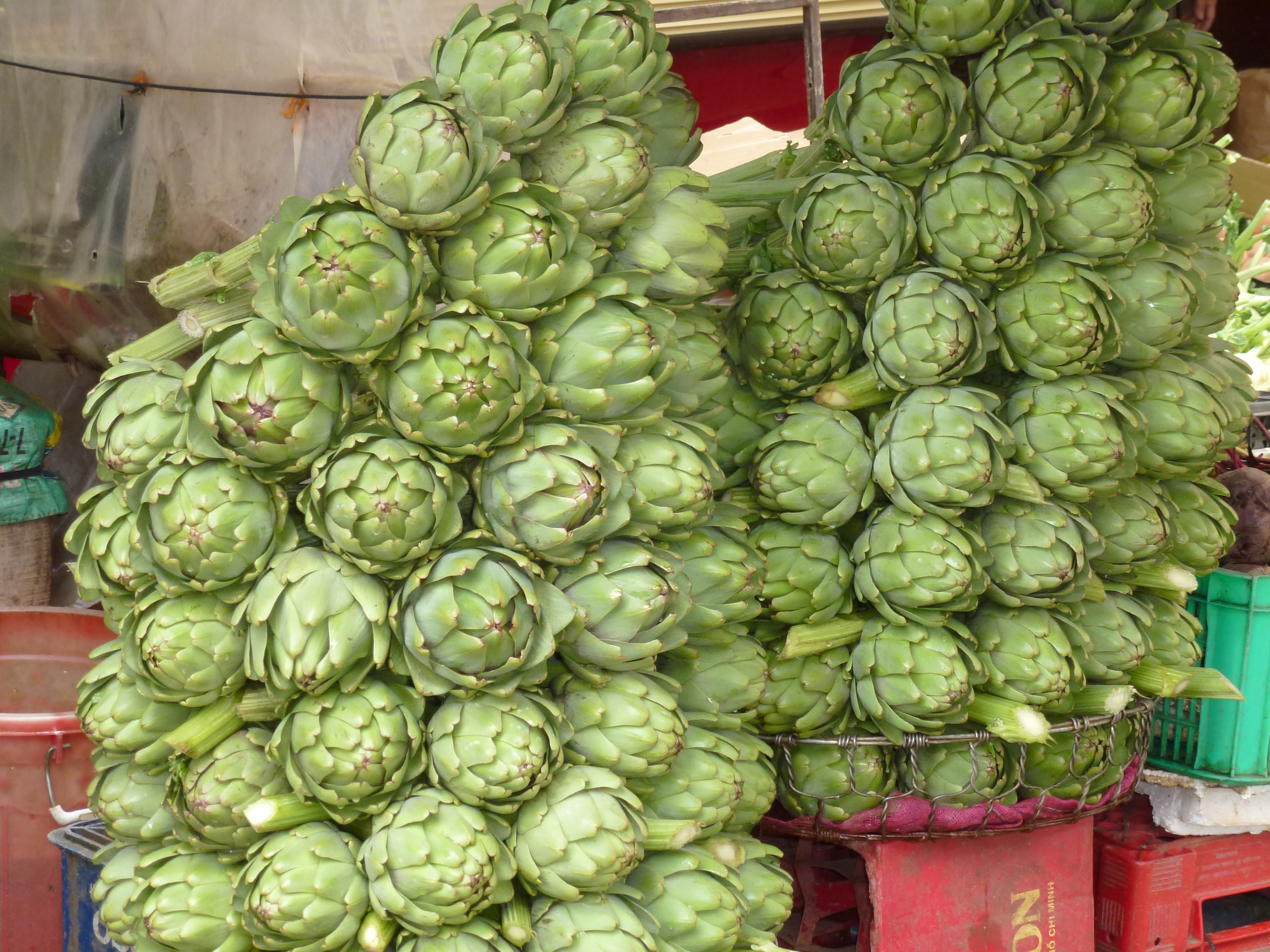
Artichokes for sale at the market
