= Da Lat =

Da Lat Đà Lạt
- Provincial city (Class-1)
- Da Lat City; Thành phố Đà Lạt
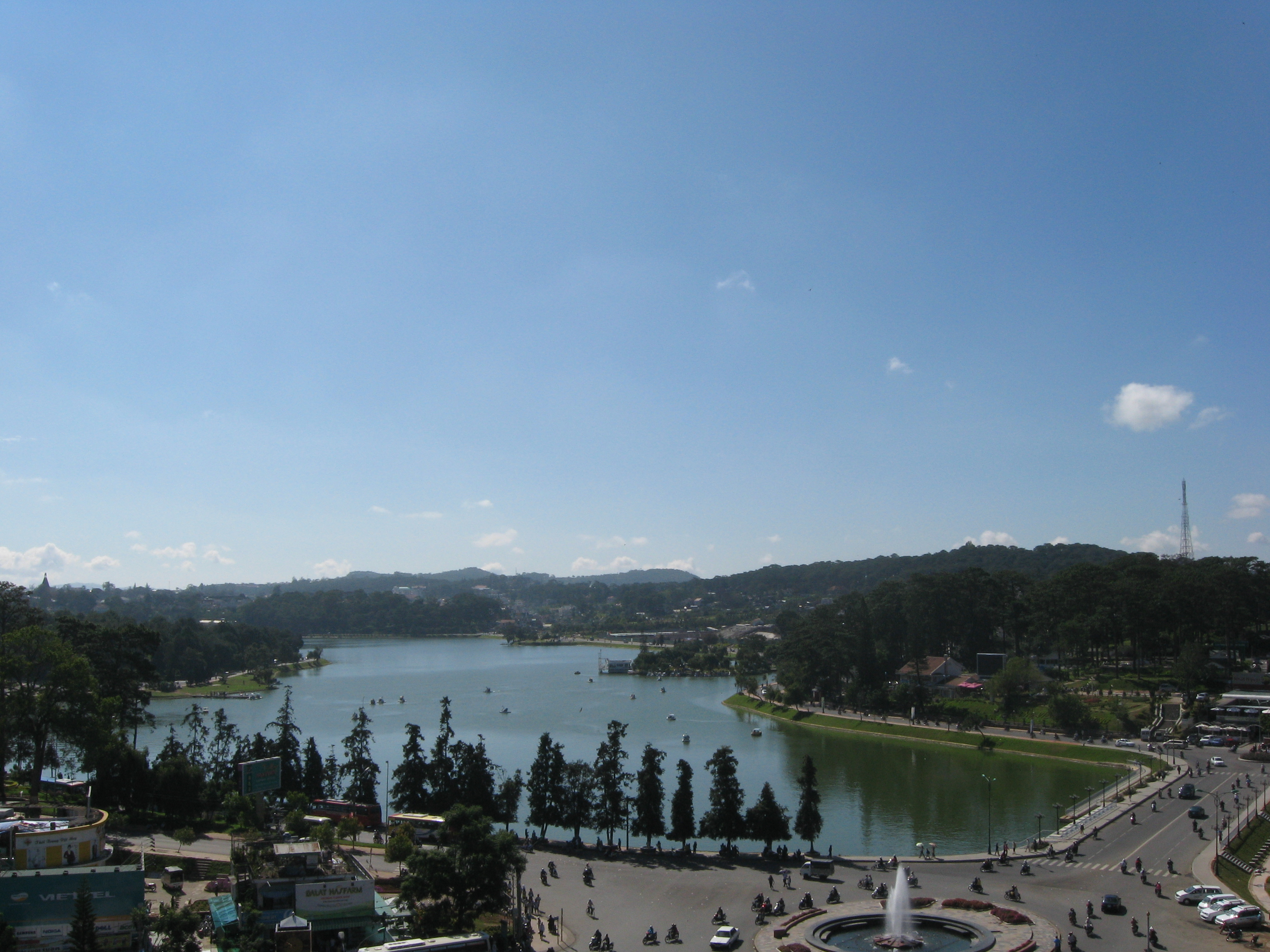
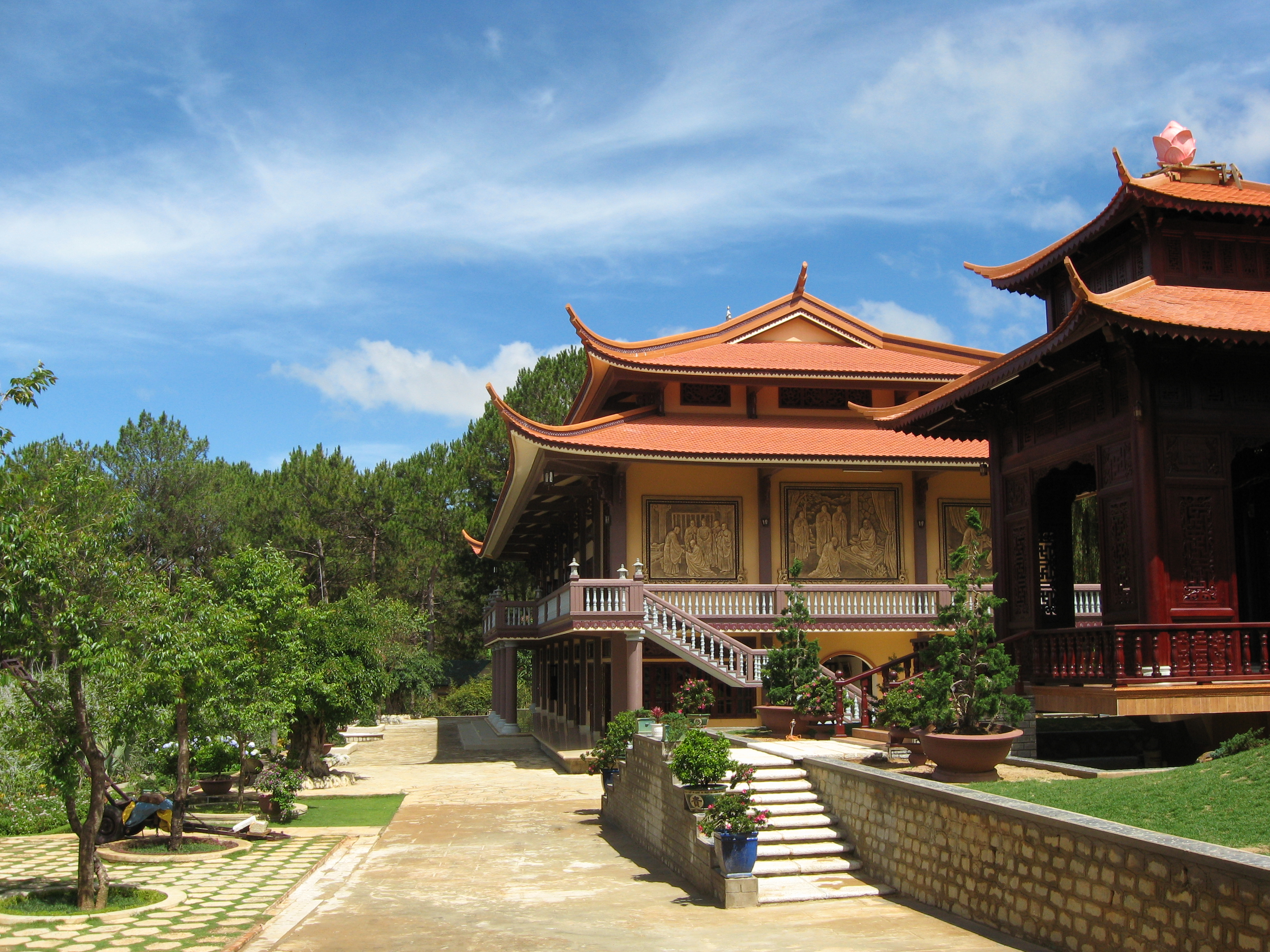
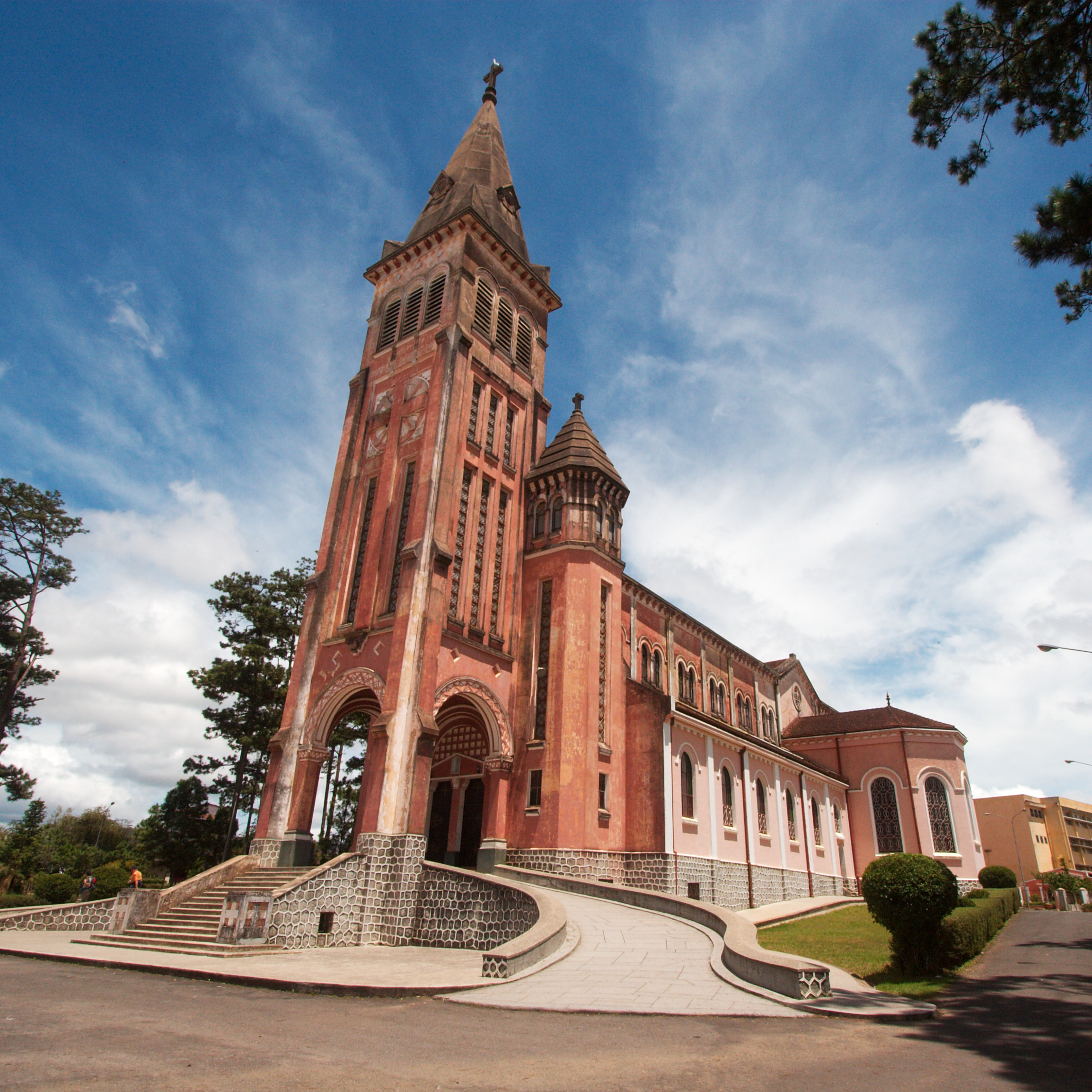
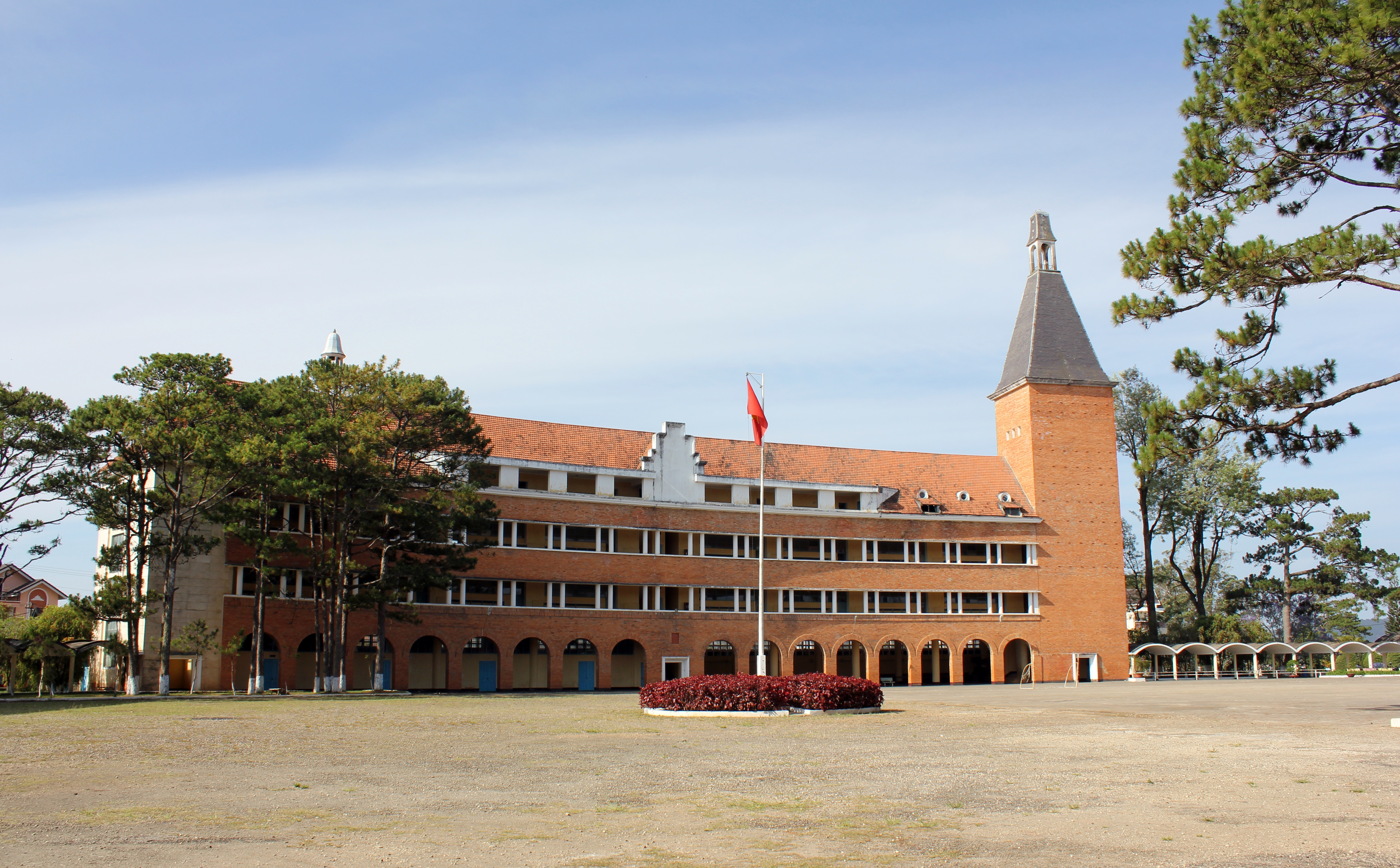
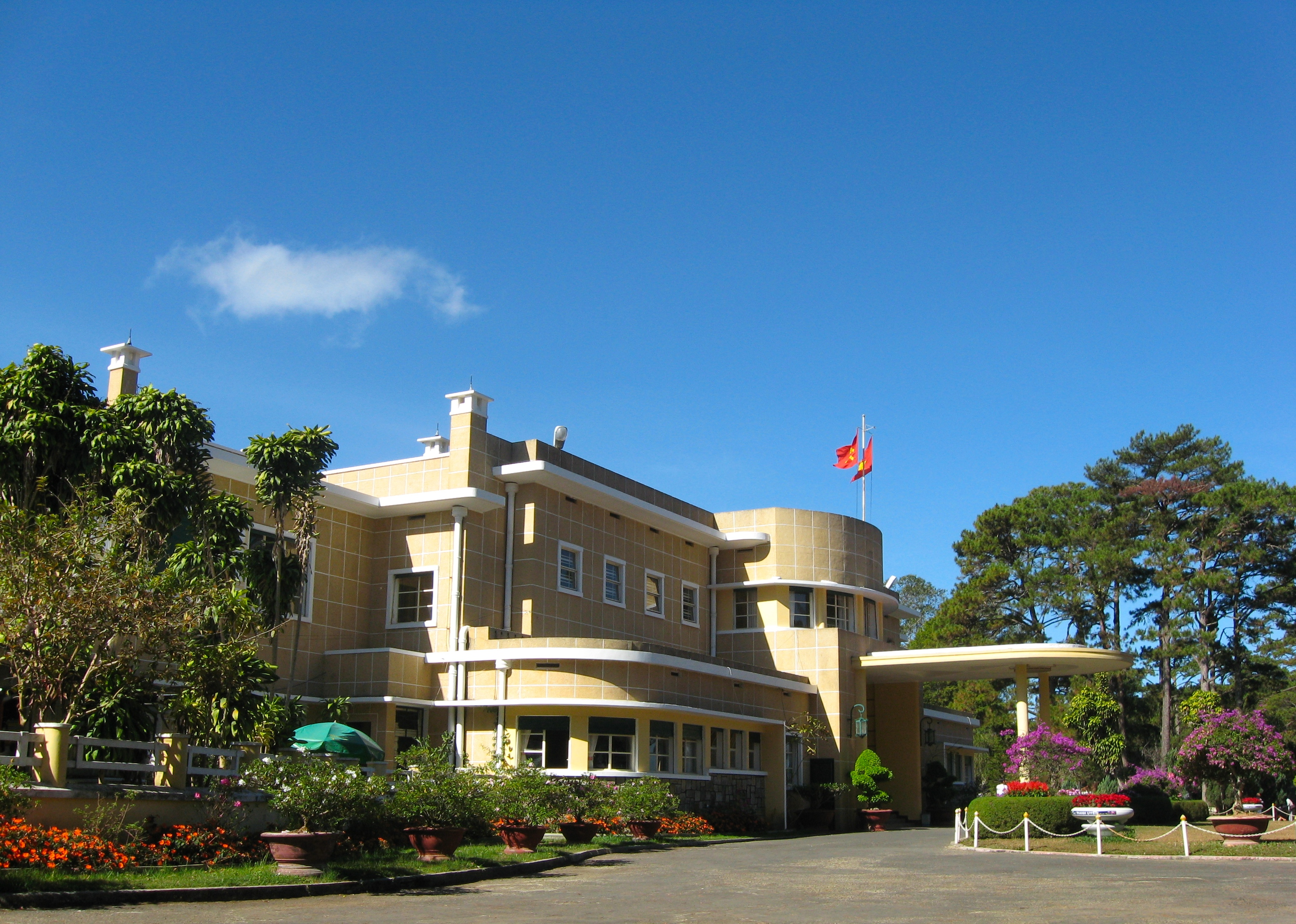
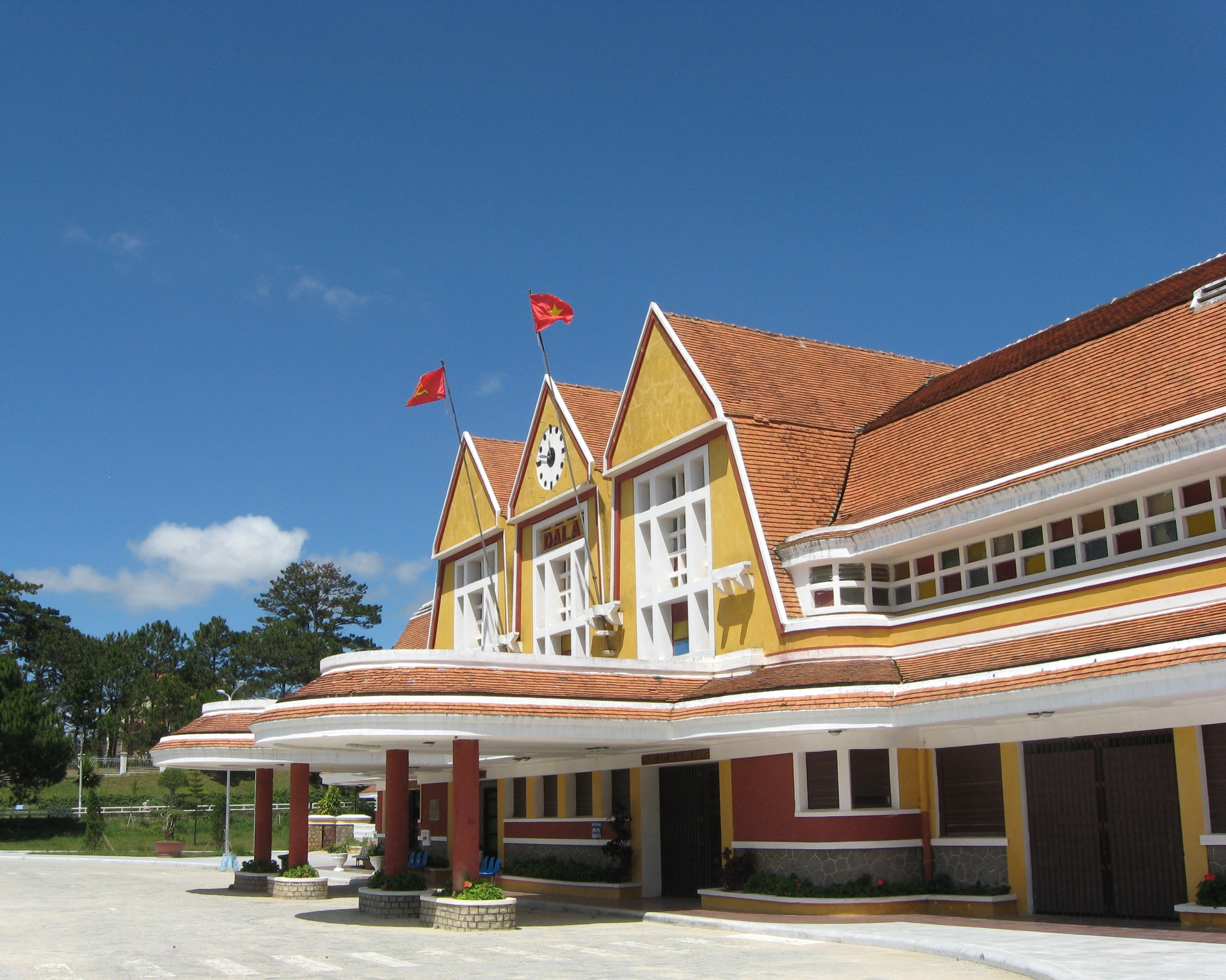
- From left to right, top to bottom: Xuân Hương Lake, Trúc Lâm Zen Monastery of Da Lat, Da Lat Cathedral, Da Lat Pedagogical College, Dinh III, Da Lat Station in the city centre

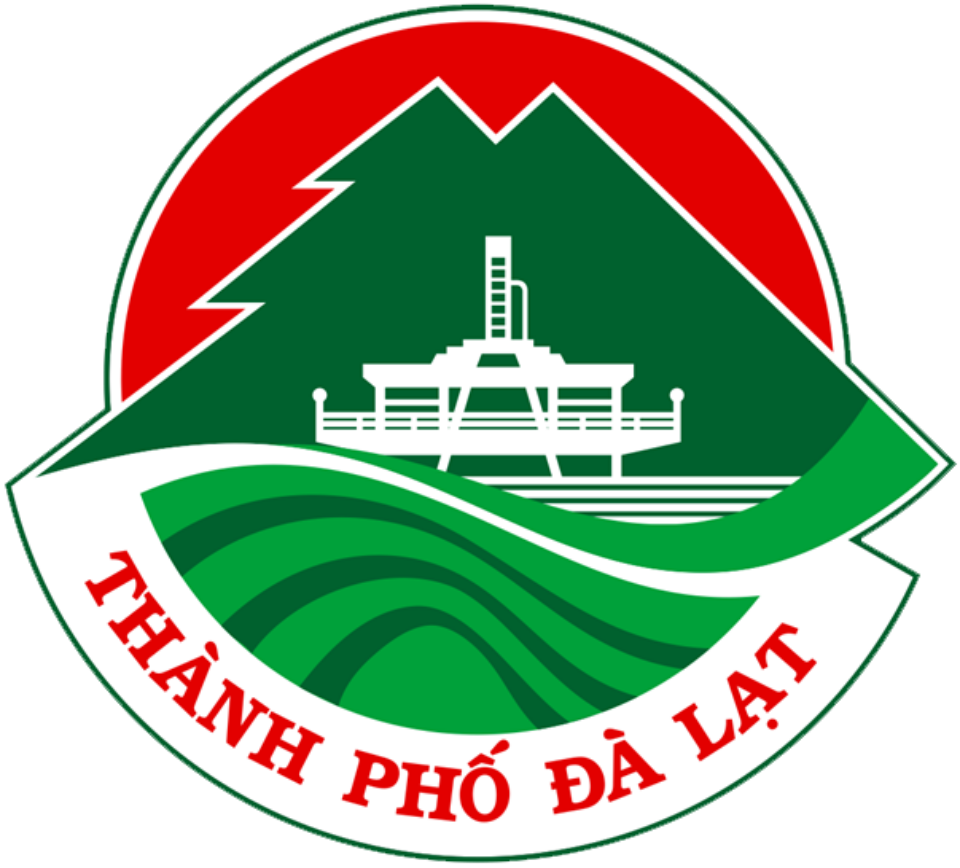
- Seal
- Nicknames: City of Thousand Flowers, City of Thousand Pines, City of Eternal Spring, City in the Fog, Little Paris
- Interactive map of Da Lat
- Location of Da Lat in Vietnam Da Lat (Southeast Asia) Da Lat (Asia)
- Coordinates: 11°56′30″N 108°26′18″E
- Country: Vietnam
- Province: Lâm Đồng
- Region: Central Highlands
- Founded: 1893: Alexandre Yersin found Lâm Viên Plateau; 1916: Huế Court announced the establishment of Da Lat town
- Demonym: Dalatese

Government
  - Chairman of the People's Committee: Tôn Thiện San
  - Secretary: Đặng Trí Dũng

Area
  - Provincial city (Class-1): 391.15 km^{2} (151.02 sq mi)
- Elevation: 1,500 m (4,900 ft)

Population (31/12/2022)
  - Provincial city (Class-1): 258.014
  - Density: 659/km^{2} (1,710/sq mi)
  - Urban: 203,710
- Time zone: UTC+7
- Climate: Cwb
- Website: https://dalat.lamdong.gov.vn/

Da Lat, or Dalat (Vietnamese: Đà Lạt; Vietnamese pronunciation: [ɗâː làːt̚]), is a former city in Vietnam and the former capital of Lâm Đồng Province. It is the largest city of the Central Highlands region in Vietnam but ceased to exist as a municipal city on 1 July 2025, following the elimination of district-level units in Vietnam. The city is located 1,500 m (4,900 ft) above sea level on the Langbiang Plateau. Da Lat is one of the most popular tourist destinations in Vietnam.

Da Lat's specific sights are pine woods and twisting roads full of marigold (Vietnamese: hoa dã quỳ) and mimosa blossom in the winter. The city's highland tropical climate stands in contrast to Southern Vietnam's otherwise lowland tropical climate. Mist covering the valleys almost year-round leads to its name "City of Eternal Spring". Residents and tourists have often said that Da Lat has all four seasons in one day: spring in the morning, summer at noon, autumn in the afternoon and winter at night, from the sunset to the sunrise.

With its year-round cool weather, Da Lat supplied huge amounts of temperate agriculture products for all over Vietnam, for example: cabbage, cauliflower, artichoke, tea, wine, persimmon, and coffee. Its flower industry produces three characteristic flowers: hydrangea (Vietnamese: cẩm tú cầu), Da Lat rose, and golden everlasting (Vietnamese: hoa bất tử). The confectionery industry offers a wide range of mứt, a kind of fruit preserve that closely resembles varenie, made from strawberry, mulberry, sweet potato, and roselle.

Da Lat is also known as an area for scientific research in the fields of biotechnology and nuclear physics. Da Lat is known regionally for avocado ice-cream, bánh tráng nướng, and its large garment market, with a broad selection of cool-weather clothing.

== Name ==
Colonial coat of arms of Dalat

The name Đà Lạt is derived from the language of the local ethnic group Lạt and its meaning is "Stream/water of the Lạt".

Some sources mention it as the backcronym of the Latin phrase 'Dat Aliis Laetitiam Aliis Temperiem' ("It Gives Pleasure to Some, Freshness to Others"), which the French colonial government used in their emblem of Da Lat.

== History ==
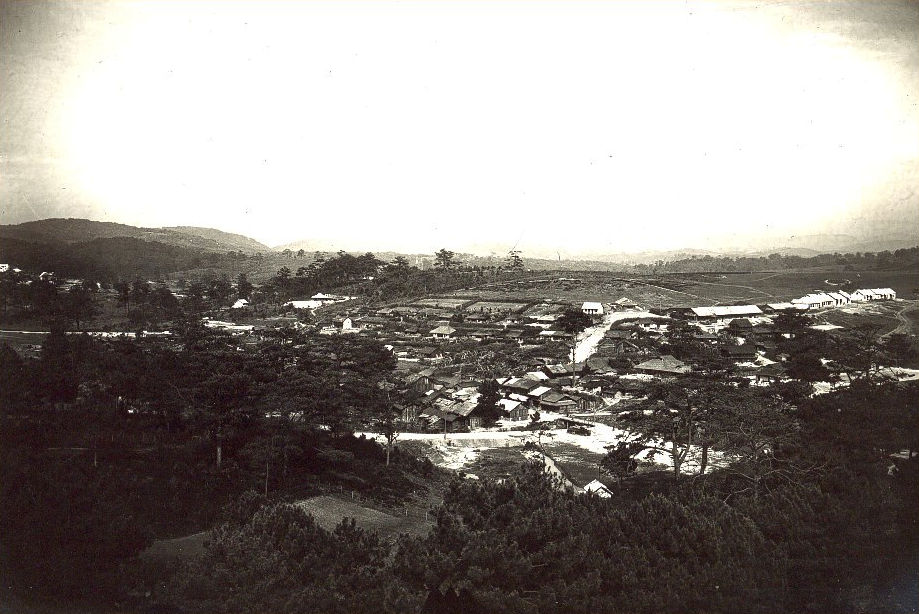
Da Lat c. 1925

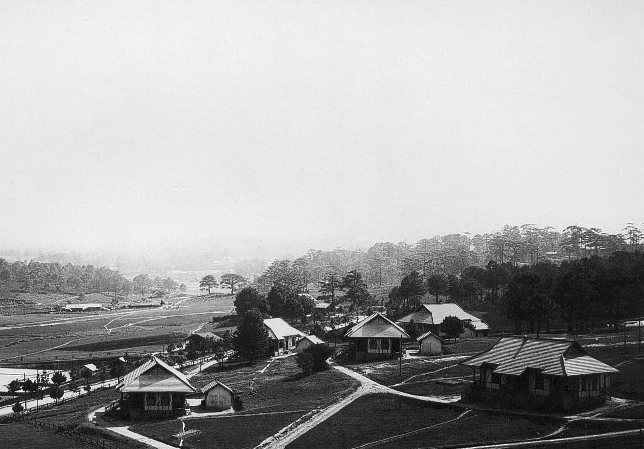
Da Lat in the late 1920s, the area near today's Dalat Palace Hotel

=== French era ===
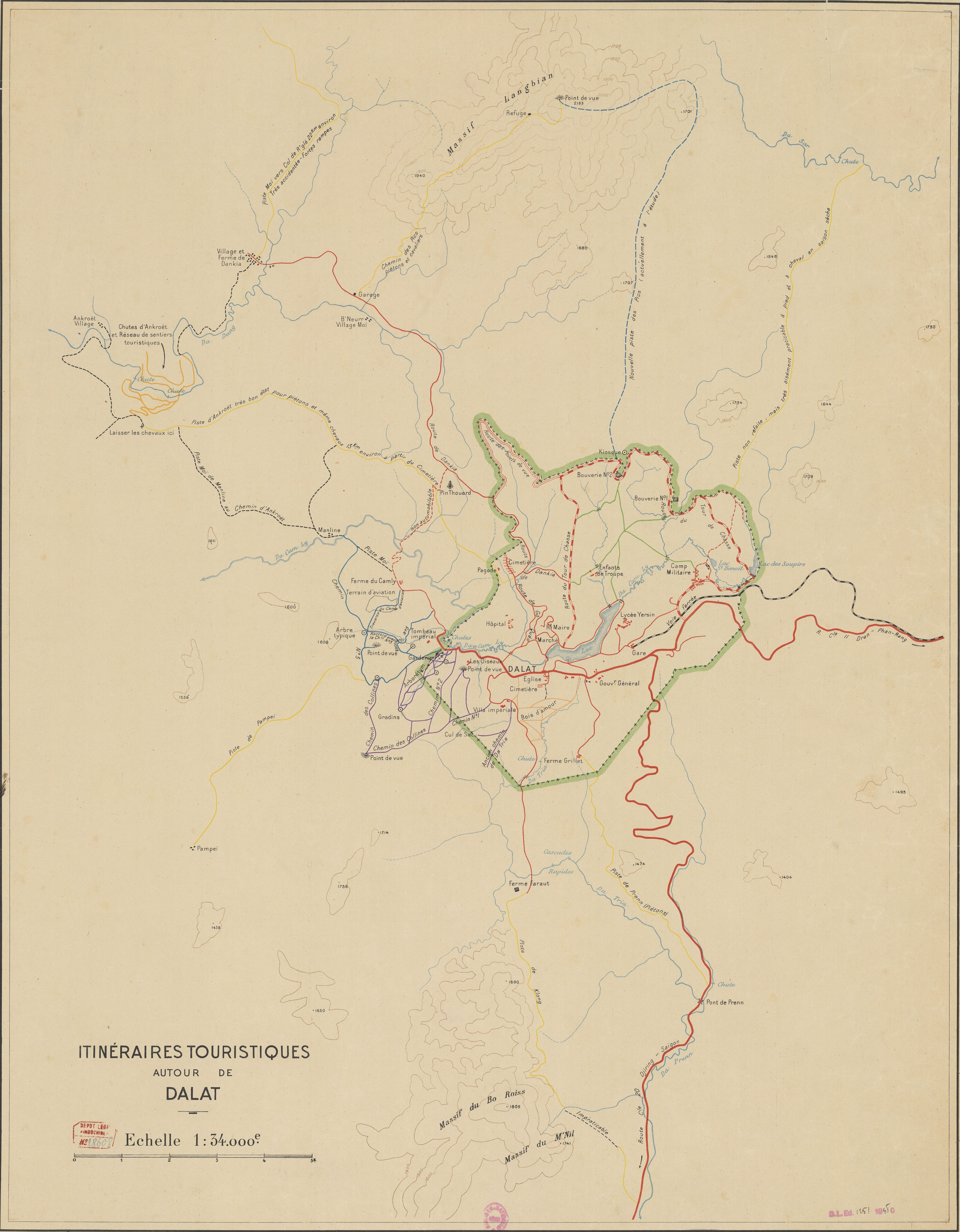
Map of Da Lat in 1942

During the 1890s, explorers in the area (including the noted bacteriologist Alexandre Yersin, protégé of the French chemist Louis Pasteur), which was then part of the French colony of Cochinchina, asked the French governor-general, Paul Doumer, to create a resort center in the highlands, and the governor agreed. The original intended site for the hill station was Dankia, but Étienne Tardif, a member of the road-building expedition of 1898–99, proposed the current site instead. In 1907, the first hotel was built. Urban planning was carried out by Ernest Hébrard.

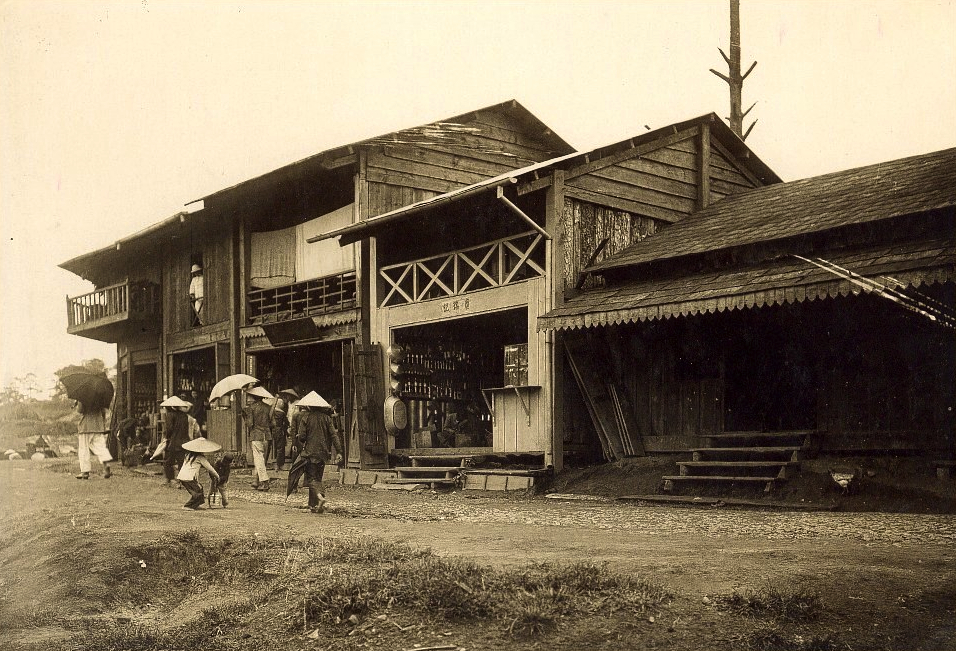
A street of Da Lat c. 1925

Many Europeans used to travel up to Da Lat to escape the heat of the lower coastal areas and Mekong delta.

The French endowed the city with villas and boulevards, and its Swiss charms remain today. Hébrard included the requisite health complex, golf course, parks, schools, and homes but no industry. The legacy of boarding schools where children from the whole of Indochina were taught by French priests, nuns, and expatriates still existed as late as 1969. In 1929, the Christian and Missionary Alliance established a school which later shortly relocated to Bangkok, Thailand, due to the Vietnam War and has been located in Penang, Malaysia, since the 1970s. There were seminaries of Jesuits (such as Pius X Pontifical College) as well as other orders.

In the 1920s and 1930s, there were ideas of making Da Lat the 'summer capital', 'administrative capital', and 'federal capital' of French Indochina. During the World War II, Governor-general Jean Decoux (r. 1940–1945) supported this project.

=== South Vietnamese era ===
Da Lat remained a resort city following the establishment of South Vietnam after the French withdrawal from Indochina. It was a popular destination for both civilians and military members largely due to its cool climate, spas, and colonial-era hotels.

In the mid-1950s, the Vietnamese Scout Association established their national training grounds at Da Lat.

The South Vietnamese National Military Academy took control of the former French Far East Expeditionary Corps academy in Da Lat in 1954. Despite this, the city was not heavily affected by the Vietnam War. The only major involvement Da Lat had during the Vietnam War was during the 1968 Tet Offensive. A fierce battle raged from 31 January to 11 February 1968. Most of the fighting took place between the ARVN and USAMPC units stationed in Da Lat, and Việt Cộng (VC) forces. Another brief attack targeted the military academy on 30 May 1970 before being repelled by South Vietnamese forces.

=== Present-day Vietnam ===
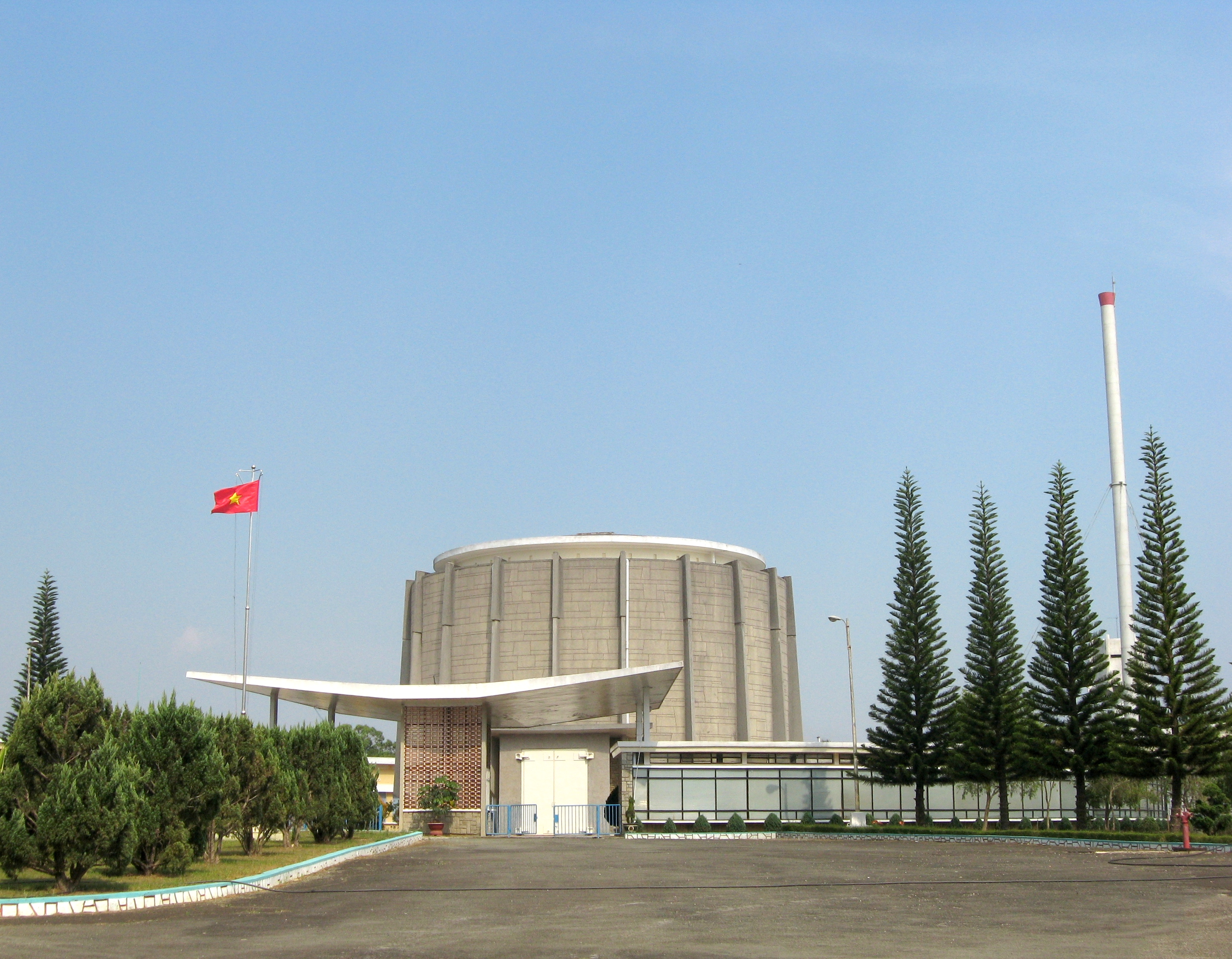
Da Lat Nuclear Research Institute (Viện Nghiên cứu Hạt nhân Đà Lạt)

South Vietnam eventually fell under communist rule and was merged with the Democratic Republic of Vietnam, creating the Socialist Republic of Vietnam and also experiencing the Đổi Mới reforms along with the rest of the country.

Places like Da Lat as well as Hoi An and Da Nang are regularly regarded as amongst the most romantic tourist places in Vietnam. Da Lat has also become a hub for nuclear research and biotechnology.

== Geography ==
Da Lat is located 1,500 m (4,900 ft) above sea level on the Langbian Plateau in the southern parts of the Central Highlands (in Vietnamese: Tây Nguyên).

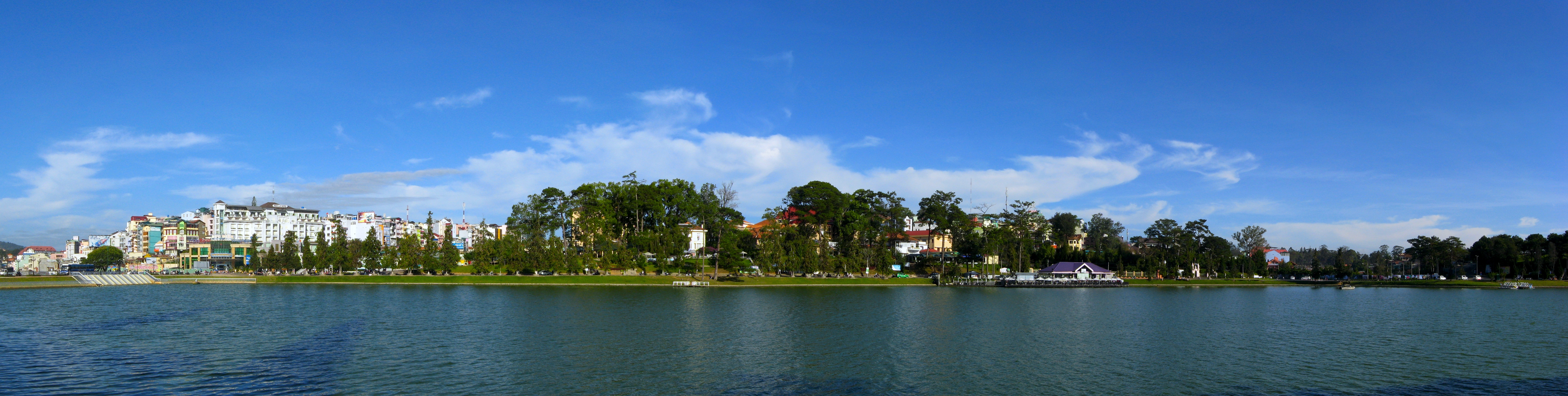
Xuan Huong Lake in the morning

=== Geology ===
Da Lat is a source area for pyroxene from meteorites from the Australasian strewnfield.

=== Administrative ===
Da Lat is divided into 11 wards numbered from 1 to 11, and 4 communes: Tà Nung, Xuân Trường, Xuân Thọ and Trạm Hành.

=== Climate ===
Da Lat

Climate chart (precipitation, max. and min. temperature)
J	F	M	A	M	J	J	A	S	O	N	D
9 22 11	20 23 11	64 25 13	170 25 14	212 24 16	203 23 16	232 23 16	238 22 16	283 22 16	244 22 15	93 21 14	36 21 13
- █ Average max. and min. temperatures in °C
- █ Precipitation totals in mm
- Source: Vietnam Meteorological Administration
Imperial conversion
J	F	M	A	M	J	J	A	S	O	N	D
0.4 72 52	0.8 73 52	2.5 77 55	6.7 77 57	8.3 75 61	8 73 61	9.1 73 61	9.4 72 61	11 72 61	9.6 72 59	3.7 70 57	1.4 70 55
- █ Average max. and min. temperatures in °F
- █ Precipitation totals in inches

Da Lat features a subtropical highland climate under the Köppen climate classification (Cwb) and is mostly mild year round.

Da Lat's year-round temperate weather, standing in contrast to central & southern Vietnam's otherwise-tropical climate, has led it to be nicknamed the "City of Eternal Spring". The average temperature is 14 to 23 °C (57 to 73 °F). The highest temperature ever in Da Lat was 31.5 °C (88.7 °F), and the lowest was −0.6 °C (30.9 °F). Mist covers the adjoining valleys almost year-round. Its temperate climate also makes it ideal for agriculture. Indeed, Da Lat is renowned for its orchids, roses, vegetables, and fruits. There are nascent wine-making and flower-growing industries in the region.

There are two separate seasons in Da Lat. The rainy season lasts from May to October, and the dry season lasts from November through April of the next year. The average annual precipitation is 1,750 mm.

Climate data for Da Lat, elevation 1,513 m (4,964 ft)
Month	Jan	Feb	Mar	Apr	May	Jun	Jul	Aug	Sep	Oct	Nov	Dec	Year
Record high °C (°F)	30.0 (86.0)	31.0 (87.8)	31.5 (88.7)	31.2 (88.2)	30.6 (87.1)	30.0 (86.0)	29.2 (84.6)	29.3 (84.7)	29.7 (85.5)	30.0 (86.0)	29.2 (84.6)	29.4 (84.9)	31.5 (88.7)
Mean daily maximum °C (°F)	22.3 (72.1)	23.9 (75.0)	25.1 (77.2)	25.3 (77.5)	24.7 (76.5)	23.6 (74.5)	23.0 (73.4)	22.7 (72.9)	22.9 (73.2)	22.8 (73.0)	21.7 (71.1)	21.4 (70.5)	23.3 (73.9)
Daily mean °C (°F)	15.9 (60.6)	16.9 (62.4)	18.1 (64.6)	19.0 (66.2)	19.5 (67.1)	19.2 (66.6)	18.8 (65.8)	18.6 (65.5)	18.5 (65.3)	18.2 (64.8)	17.5 (63.5)	16.4 (61.5)	18.0 (64.4)
Mean daily minimum °C (°F)	11.7 (53.1)	11.9 (53.4)	13.0 (55.4)	14.7 (58.5)	16.2 (61.2)	16.4 (61.5)	16.2 (61.2)	16.2 (61.2)	16.0 (60.8)	15.3 (59.5)	14.6 (58.3)	13.2 (55.8)	14.6 (58.3)
Record low °C (°F)	−0.1 (31.8)	−0.6 (30.9)	4.2 (39.6)	4.0 (39.2)	10.0 (50.0)	10.9 (51.6)	10.0 (50.0)	10.6 (51.1)	10.0 (50.0)	8.1 (46.6)	4.4 (39.9)	2.6 (36.7)	−0.6 (30.9)
Average rainfall mm (inches)	9.1 (0.36)	20.5 (0.81)	64.1 (2.52)	170.3 (6.70)	212.3 (8.36)	203.5 (8.01)	232.7 (9.16)	238.3 (9.38)	283.4 (11.16)	244.7 (9.63)	93.5 (3.68)	36.2 (1.43)	1,808.6 (71.2)
Average rainy days	2.2	2.5	5.8	12.8	20.5	21.2	23.8	23.1	24.0	20.0	11.5	5.9	176.8
Average relative humidity (%)	81.2	77.7	78.1	83.3	87.2	88.8	89.7	90.4	90.2	88.6	85.4	84.2	85.5
Mean monthly sunshine hours	237.4	231.1	240.2	199.2	195.5	150.3	146.9	134.4	126.5	139.8	168.5	198.7	2,147.8
Source 1: Địa chí Đà Lạt (extremes 1918–1940, and 1964–1998)
Source 2: Vietnam Institute for Building Science and Technology, The Yearbook of Indochina (1932-1933)

== Education ==
- Dalat University (Trường Đại học Đà Lạt)
- Yersin University (Trường Đại học Yersin Đà Lạt)
- The Pedagogical College of Da Lat (Trường Cao đẳng Sư phạm Đà Lạt)
- Ho Chi Minh City University of Architecture – Đà Lạt Campus (Trường Đại học Kiến trúc TP.HCM – Phân hiệu Đà Lạt)

== Transport ==
- Da Lat station is the city's main railway station along the Da Lat–Thap Cham railway line. There are also direct services to and from Ho Chi Minh City (Saigon station).
- Dau Giay–Dalat Expressway (or Dau Giay–Lien Khuong Expressway) starts at the Dầu Giây junction of National Route 1 and Ho Chi Minh City–Long Thanh–Dau Giay Expressway, connecting Dalat with Ho Chi Minh City.
- Lien Khuong International Airport is located 30 km (19 mi) south of the city. The airport provides daily direct domestic flights to Ho Chi Minh City and Hanoi operated by Vietnam Airlines, VietJet Air, Bamboo Airways, and Pacific Airlines. There is also a direct international flight to Kuala Lumpur from the airport which is operated by AirAsia.
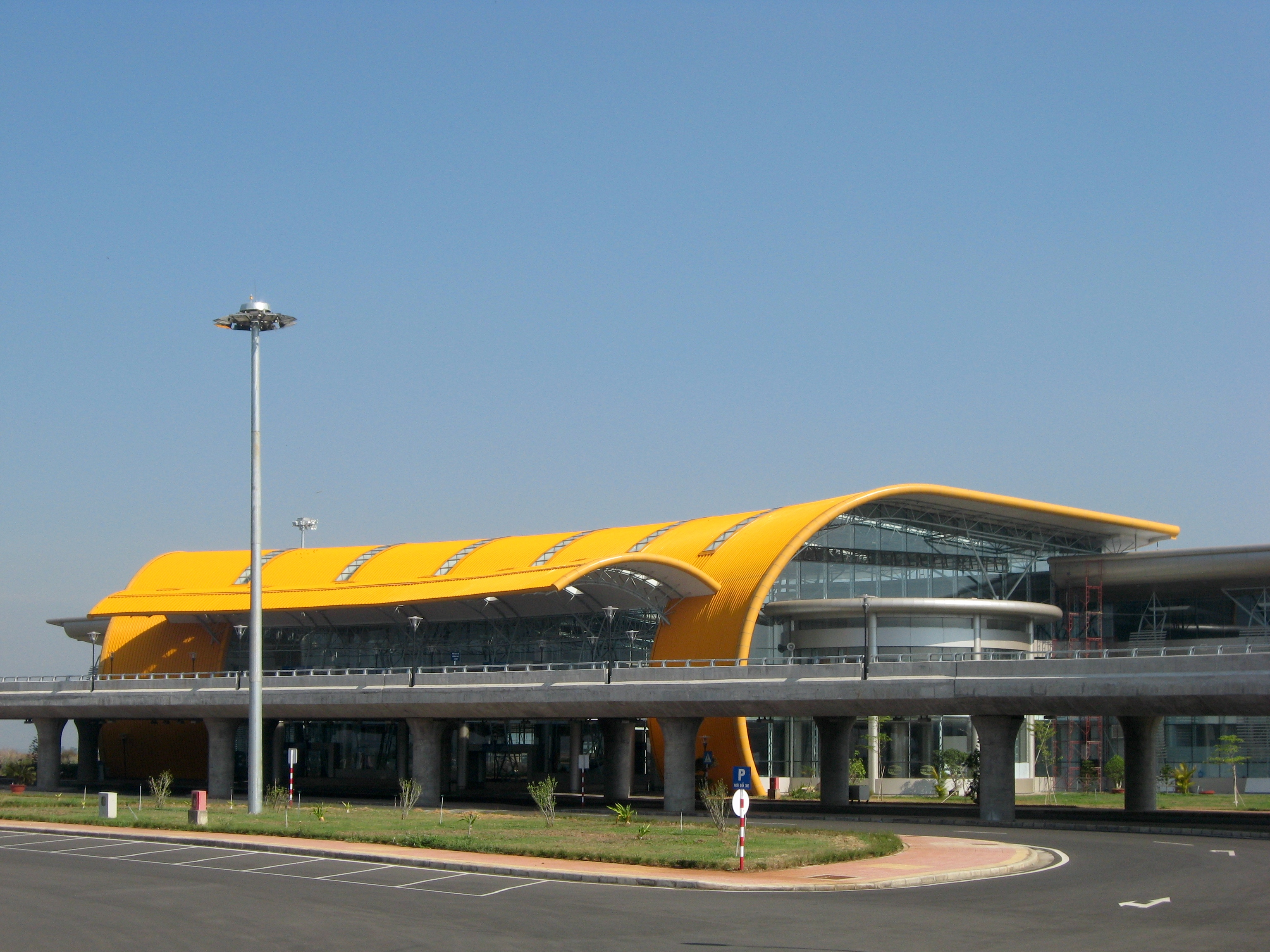
  Lien Khuong International Airport is Da Lat's main airport.

== Architecture ==
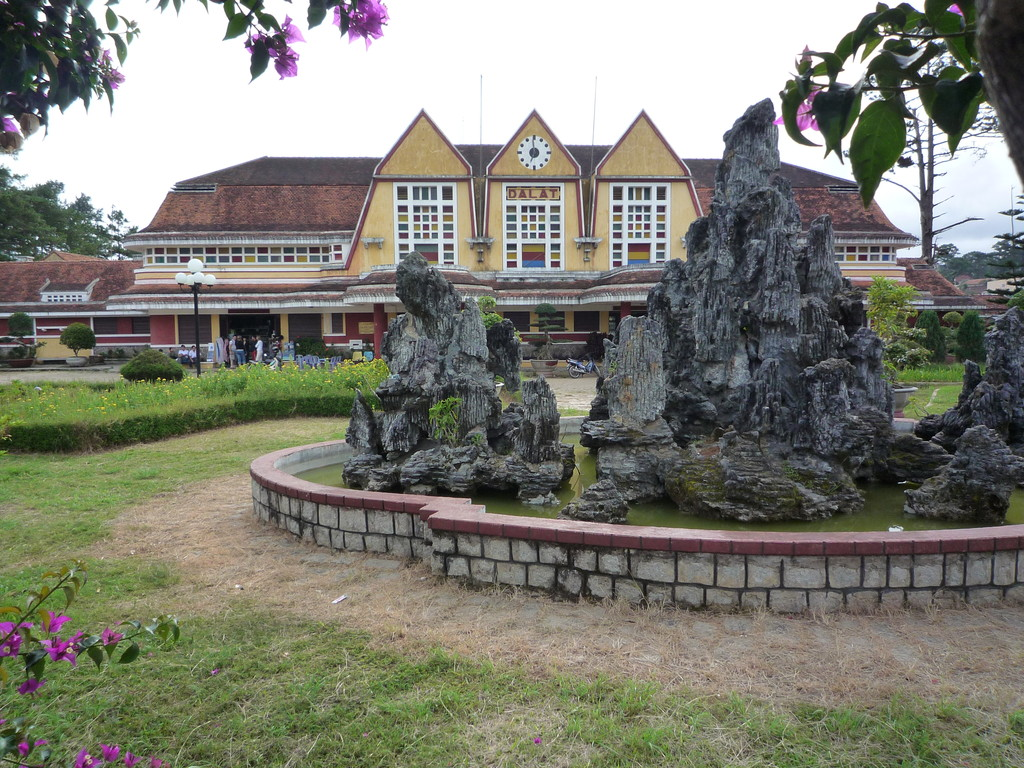
A Vietnamese Hòn Non Bộ in front of the Art Deco-influenced Da Lat Railway Station of vernacular French architecture

The architecture of Da Lat was mostly influenced by the style of the French during colonial period. Da Lat Railway Station, built in 1938, was designed in the Art Deco architectural style by French architects Moncet and Reveron, although it incorporates the high, pointed roofs characteristic of the Cao Nguyen communal buildings of Vietnam's Central Highlands. The three gables represent an art deco version of Normandy's Trouville-Deauville Station. The station's unique design—with its roofs, arching ceiling, and colored glass windows—earned it recognition as a national historical monument in 2001. They designed the Lycée Yersin, which opened in 1927. The Dominion of Mary Church and Convent, home to Roman Catholic nuns of the Mission of Charity, were built in 1938 with a similar pointed-roof style.

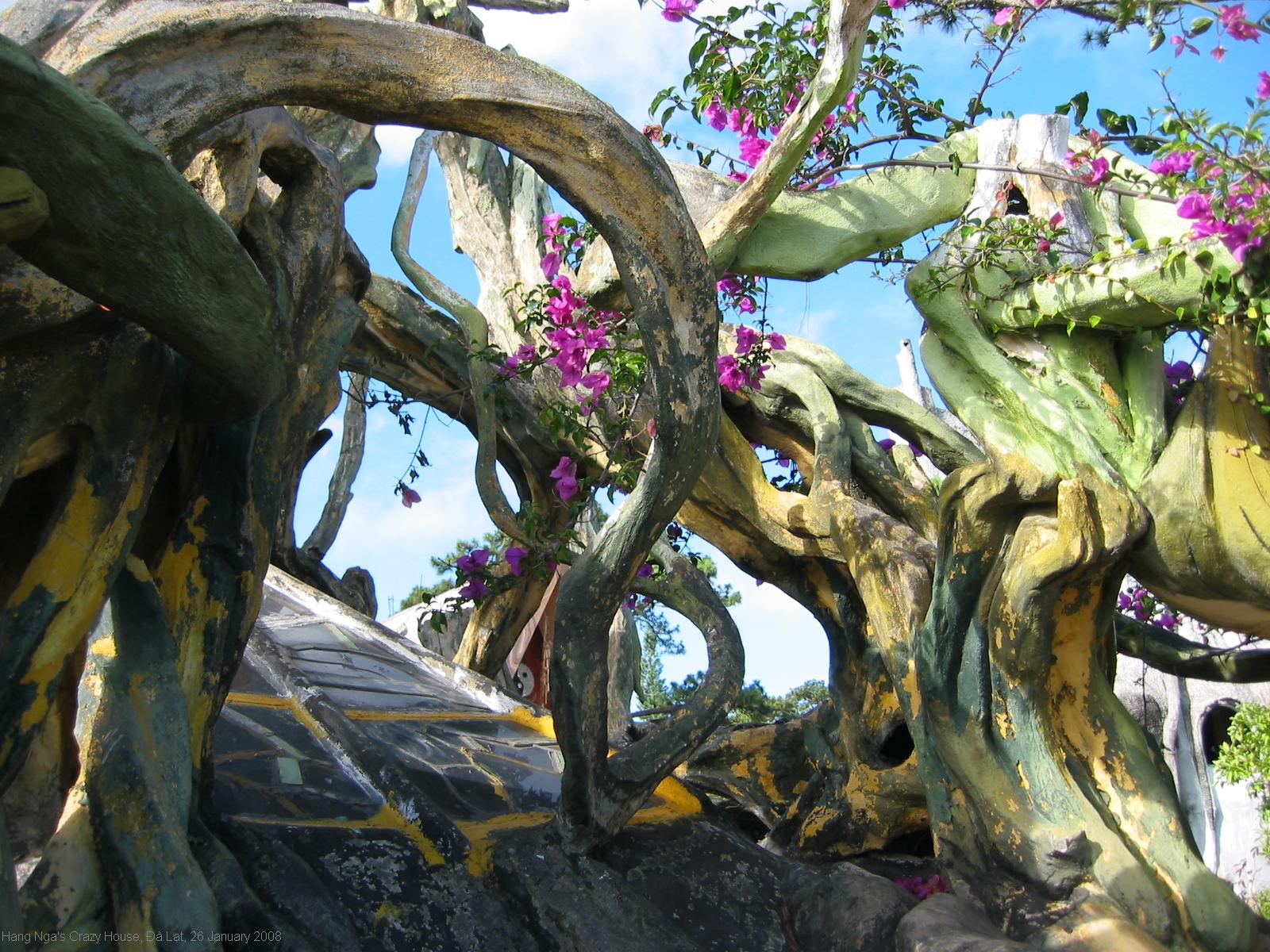
Hằng Nga guesthouse is decorated with twisting organic forms.

Of particular note is the unconventional architecture of the Hằng Nga guesthouse, popularly known as the "Crazy House". Described as a "fairy tale house", its overall design resembles a giant banyan tree, incorporating sculptured design elements representing natural forms such as animals, mushrooms, spider webs and caves. Its architecture, consisting of complex, organic, non-rectilinear shapes, has been described as expressionist. Its creator, Vietnamese architect Dang Viet Nga (also known as Hằng Nga), who holds a PhD in architecture from Moscow State University, has acknowledged the inspiration of Catalan Spanish architect Antoni Gaudí in the building's design. Visitors have variously drawn parallels between the guesthouse and the works of artists such as Salvador Dalí and Walt Disney. Since its opening in 1990, the building has gained recognition for its unique architecture, having been highlighted in numerous guidebooks and listed as one of the world's ten most "bizarre" buildings in the Chinese People's Daily.

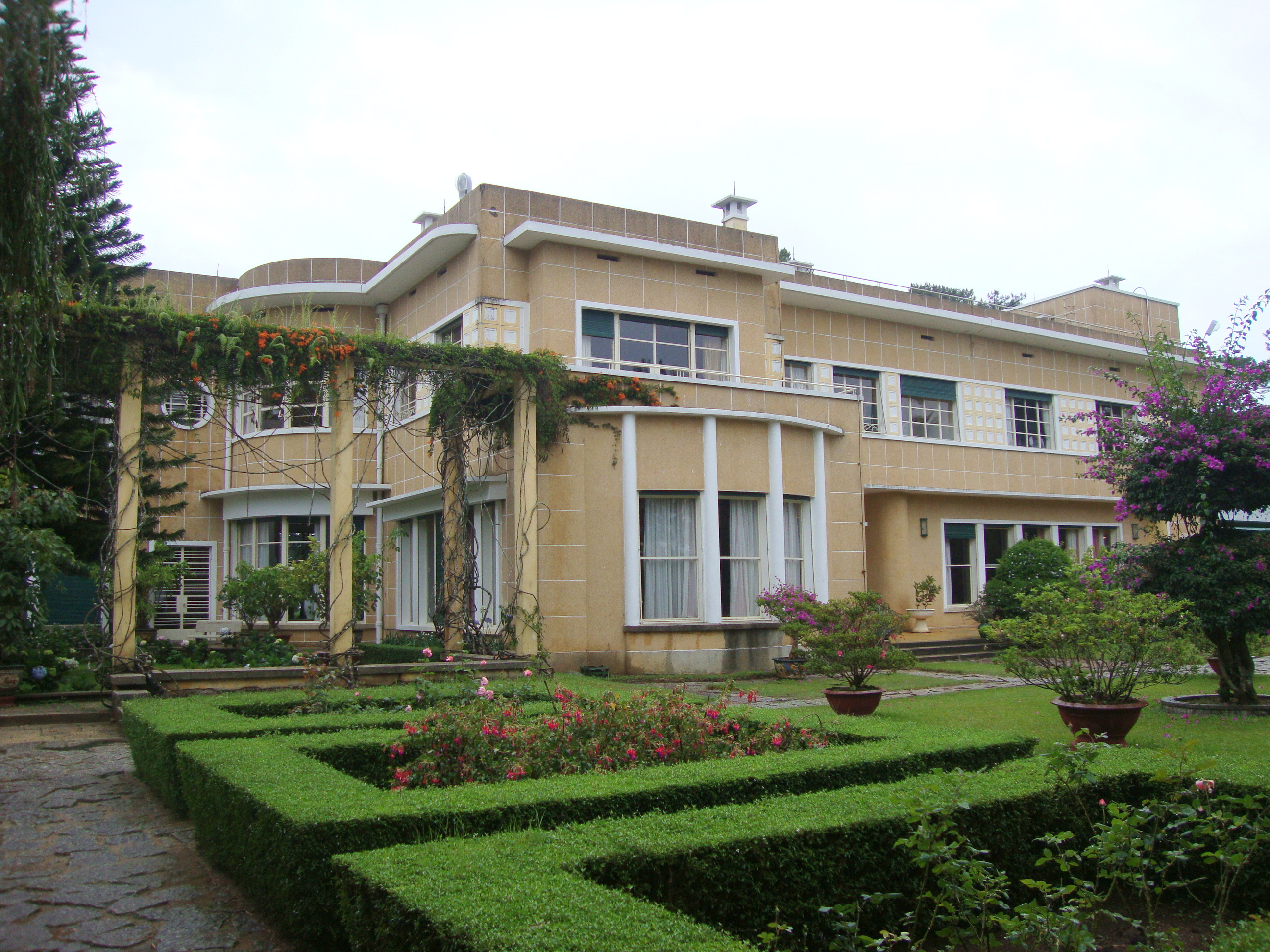
The Third Mansion

Da Lat is also well known for a series of three Mansions of the Vietnamese Last Emperor. The First Mansion was built in 1940 by the French millionaire Robert Clément Bourgery and was bought by Emperor Bao Dai in 1949. It was used as a summer mansion for President Ngo Dinh Diem and following presidents of the Republic of Vietnam until 1975. The Second Mansion was built in 1933 as the summer mansion for the Governor of French Indochina Jean Decoux. Built in 1933–1938, the Third Mansion was the residence of Emperor Bao Dai; his wife, Queen Nam Phuong; and his family. The mansion, now a museum for tourists, has attributes typical European style since both its front and backyard have flower gardens.

== Festivals ==
- Dalat Flower Festival (Festival Hoa Đà Lạt)
- Dalat Tea Culture Week (Tuần lễ văn hóa Trà Đà Lạt)
- Cherry Blossom Festival (Lễ hội Hoa Anh Đào)
- "Đồi cỏ hồng" Festival
- Rain Festival (Lễ hội Mưa)
- Gong Festival (Lễ hội Cồng chiêng)

== Tourism ==
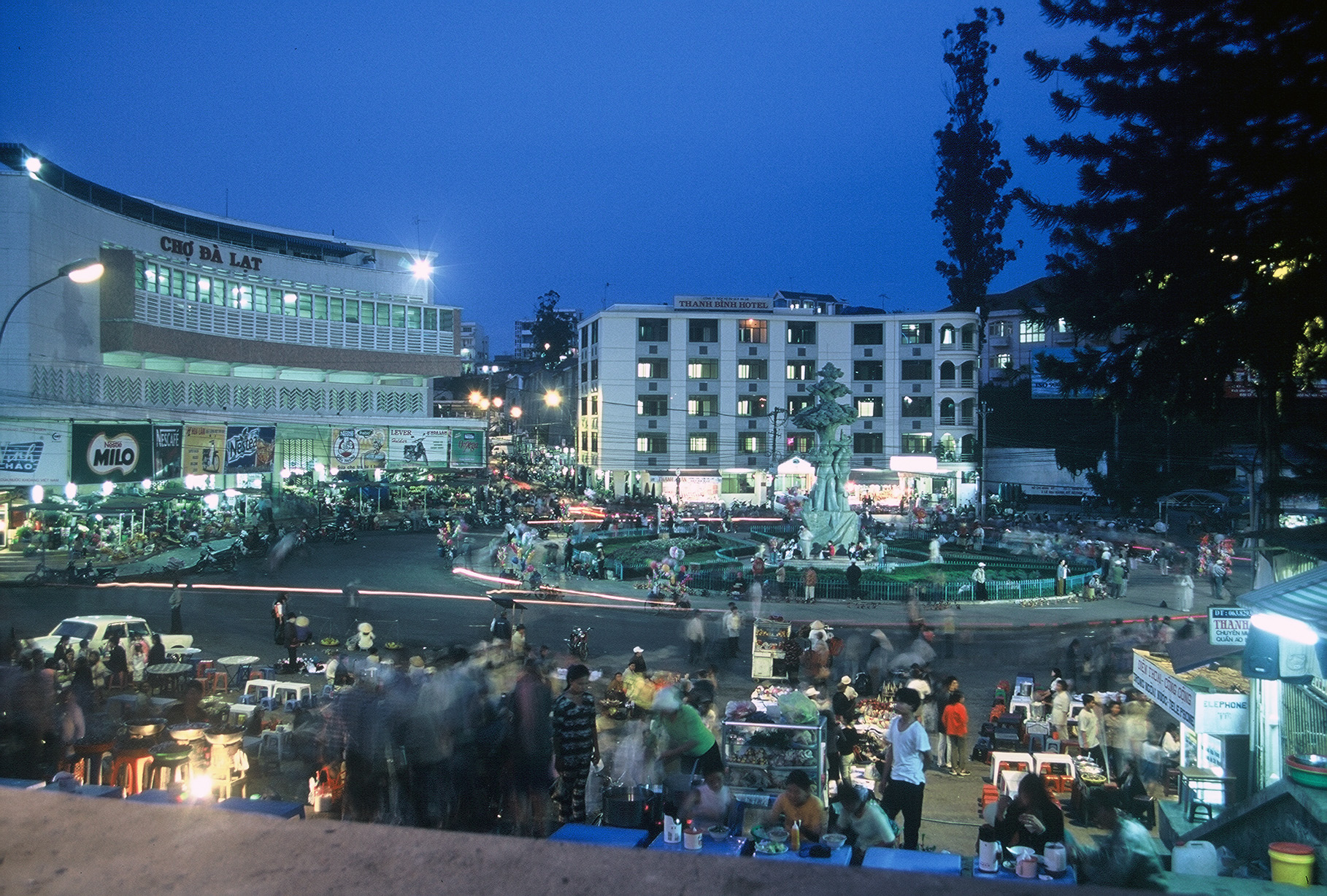
Da Lat Center Market (Chợ Đà Lạt)

Da Lat is one of the famous tourist cities of Vietnam and was included in the list of Asia's most overlooked places by CNN in 2017. Da Lat attracts both domestic tourists and foreign tourists, with more than 1,500,000 tourists and about 300,000 foreign tourists visiting the city every year. It is also the most favorite honeymoon location in Vietnam.

Hoa Binh Area or officially known as Hoa Binh Central Area (Khu Hòa Bình or Khu Trung tâm Hòa Bình), is a quarter in the downtown Da Lat and attracts numerous visitors. Some popular sites located in the Hoa Binh Area include Hoa Binh Hall (formerly Hoa Binh Theatre). Coi Xay Gio was known as a perfect selfie spot thanks to its remarkable yellow wall, though in 2021 the wall was repainted to discourage selfies due to danger from road vehicles.

=== Popular tourist places ===
- Xuân Hương Lake
- Lam Vien Square
- Hoa Binh Walking Town (Hoa Binh Area)
- The Pedagogical College of Da Lat
- Dalat Center Market
- Da Lat Railway Station
- The Palace of Bao Dai King (Dinh III)
- Clay Tunnel of Da Lat
- Tuyen Lam Lake
- Smurf Village (Làng Xì Trum)
- Truc Lam Monastery
- Linh Sơn Pagoda
- Dalat Flowers Garden
- Dalat Cathedral (Chicken Church; Nhà thờ Con Gà)
- Domaine de Marie
- Valley of Love (Thung lũng Tình Yêu)
- Dreamlike Hill (Đồi Mộng Mơ)
- Langbiang Peak
- Prenn Waterfall
- Golden Stream Lake (Suối Vàng)
- Vu Thi Village
- Dalat Heaven Gate
- Linh Quy Phap An Pagoda
- Infinite Lake (Hồ Vô Cực)
- Zoodoo Garden
- Minions Themed Village

== Gallery ==
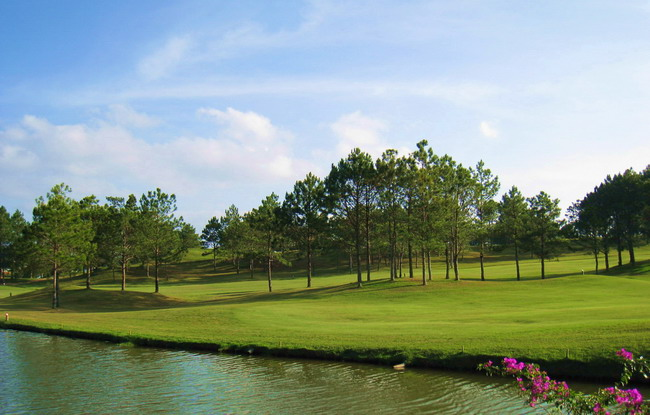
A golf course in Da Lat

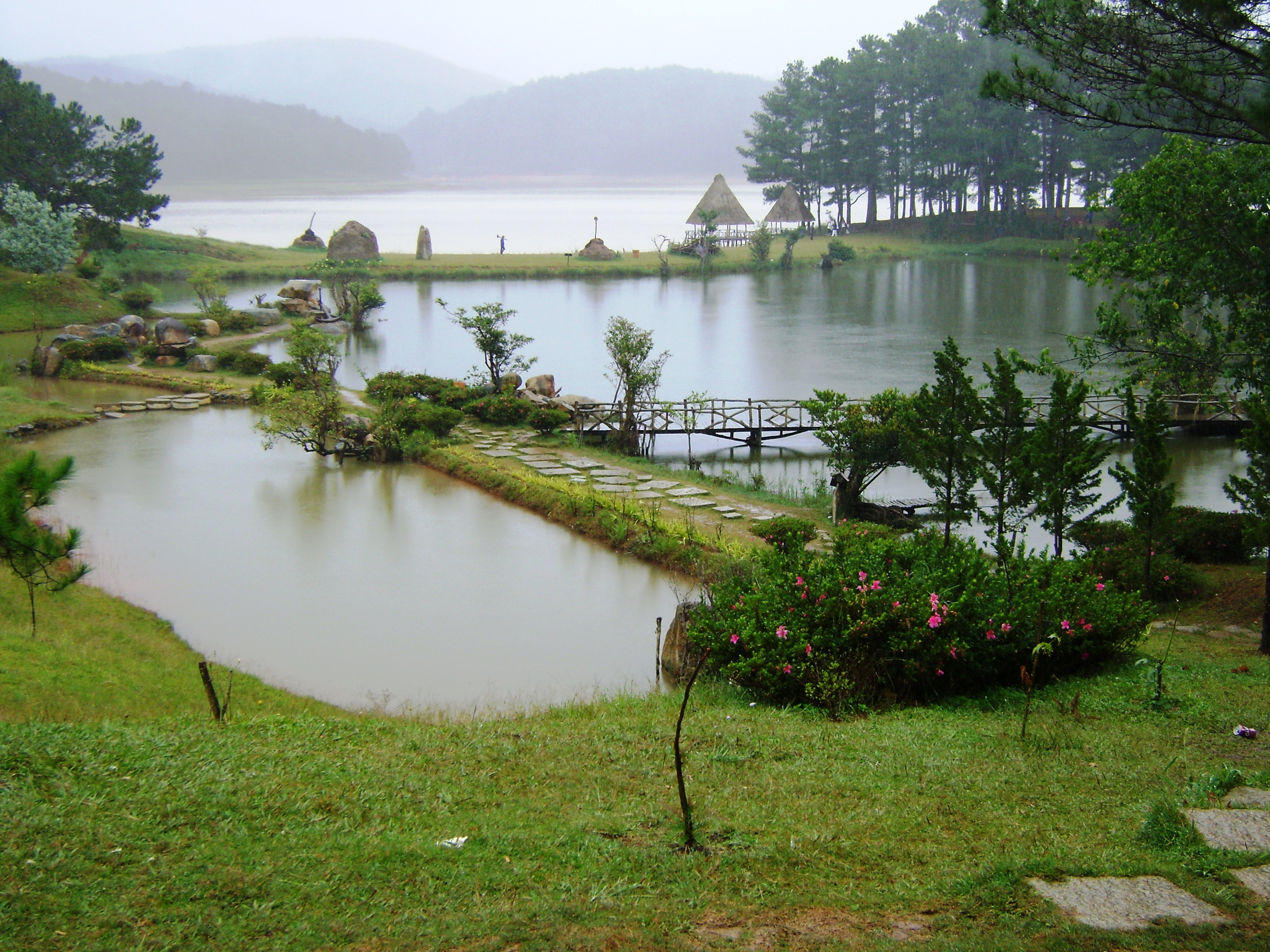
Golden Valley in the morning mist

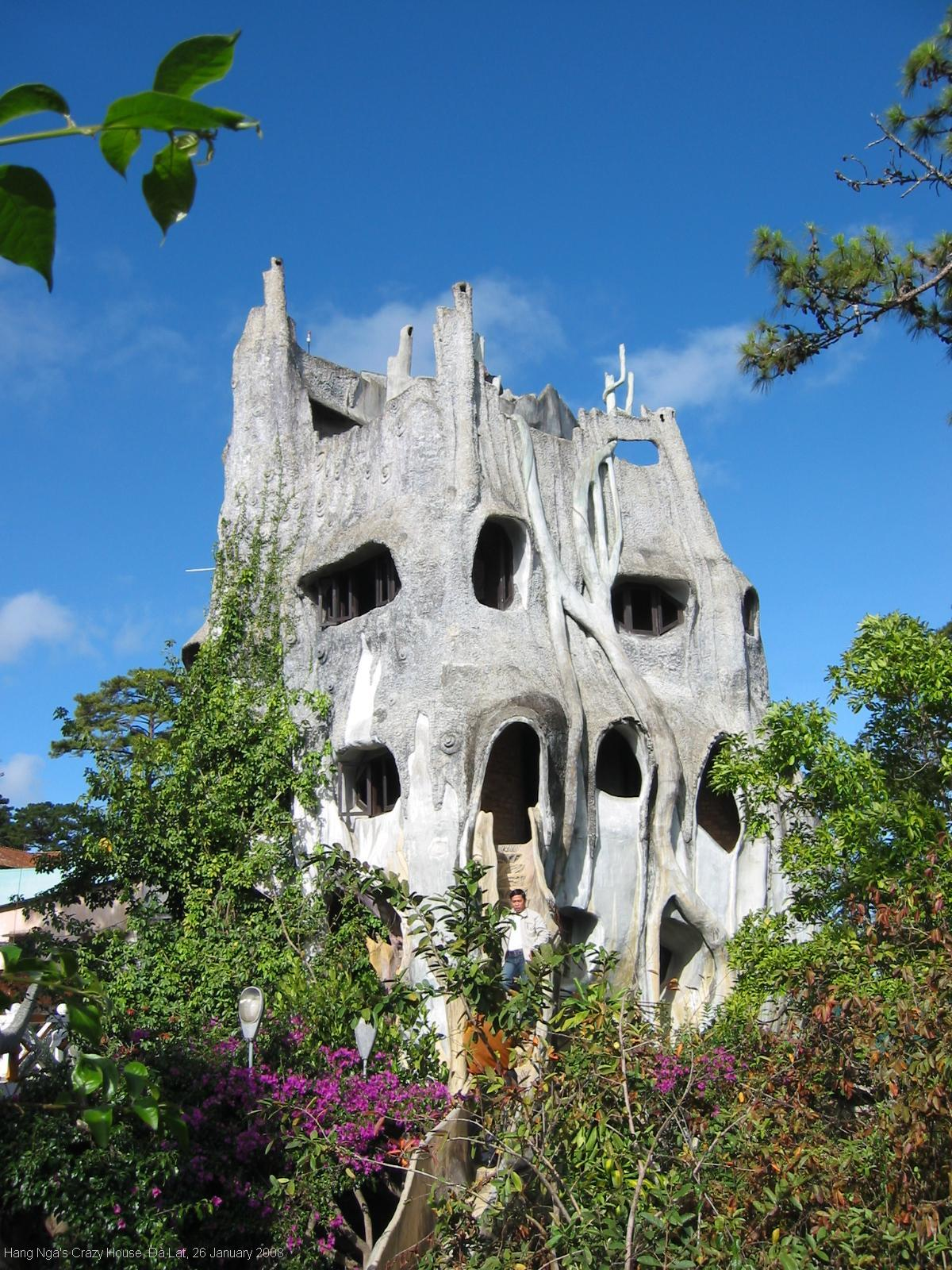
Hang Nga guesthouse

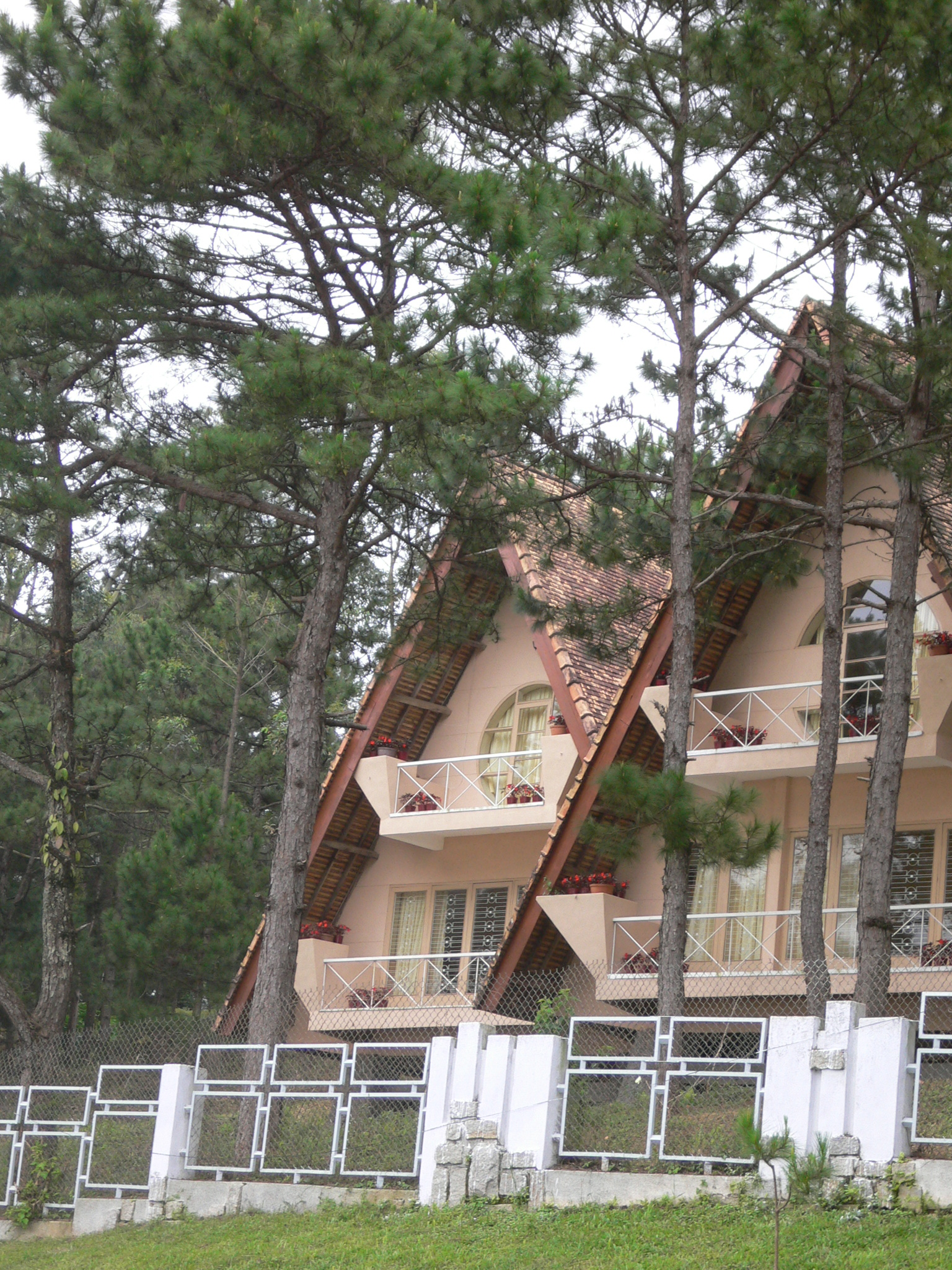
A villa in Dalat's pine forest

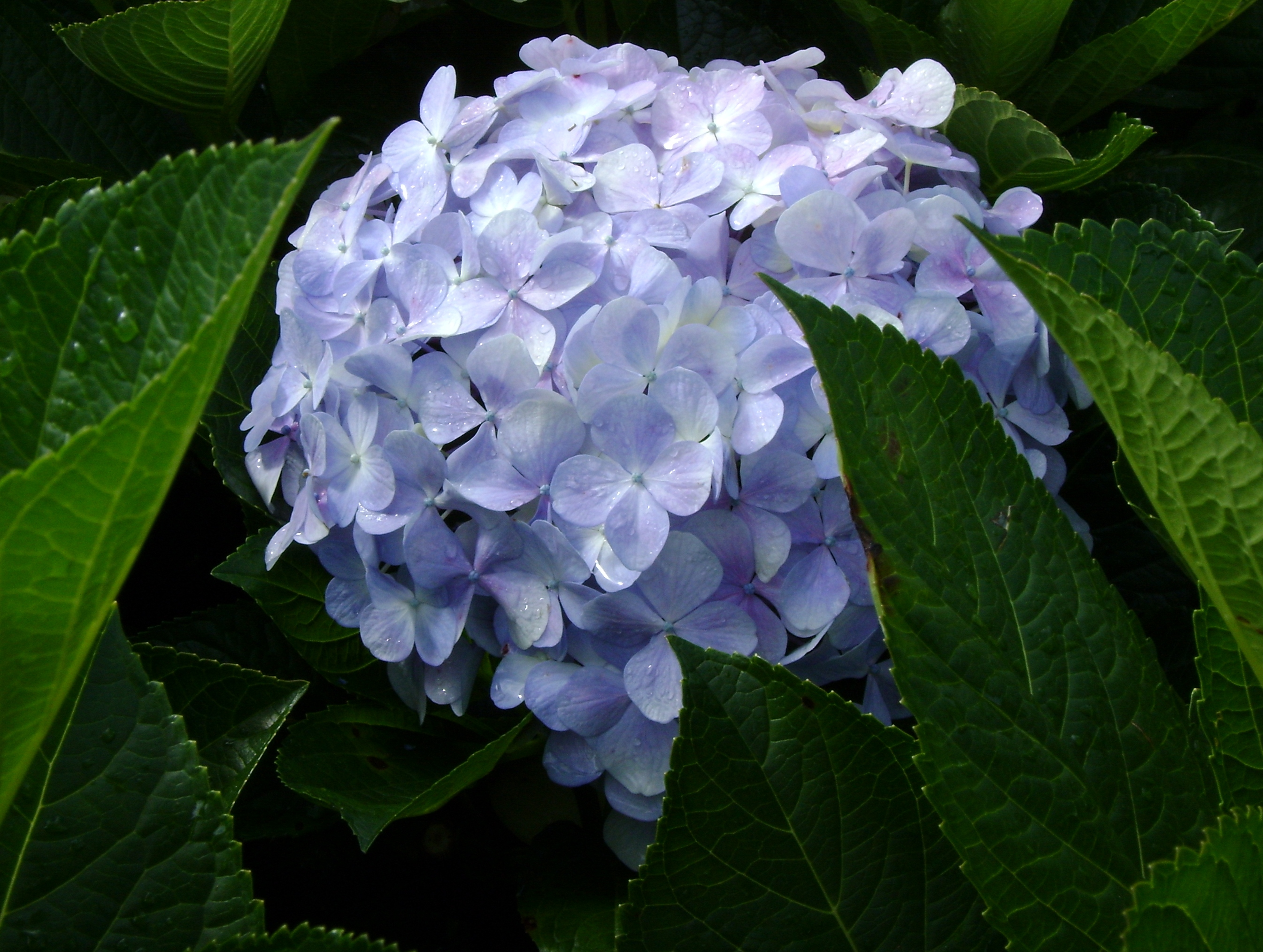
A hydrangea flower in Da Lat

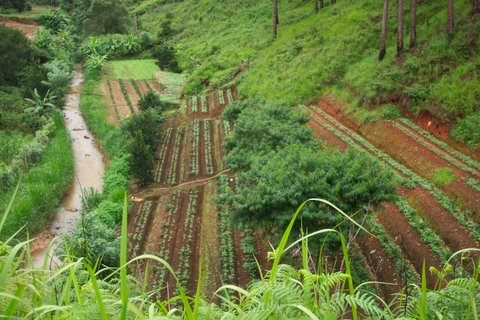
Coffee terrace near Da Lat

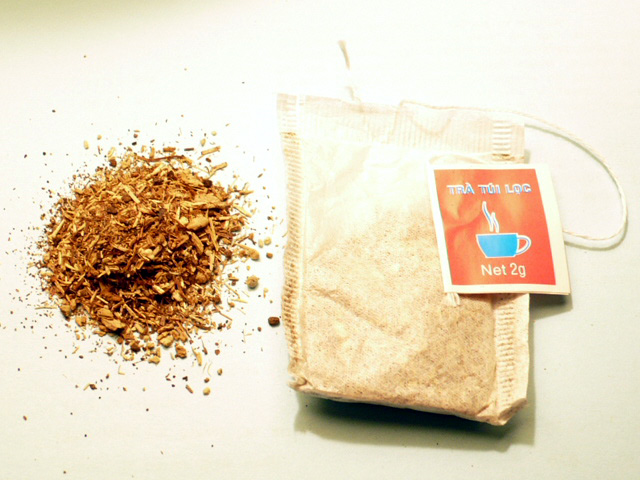
Artichoke tea, a product of Dalat

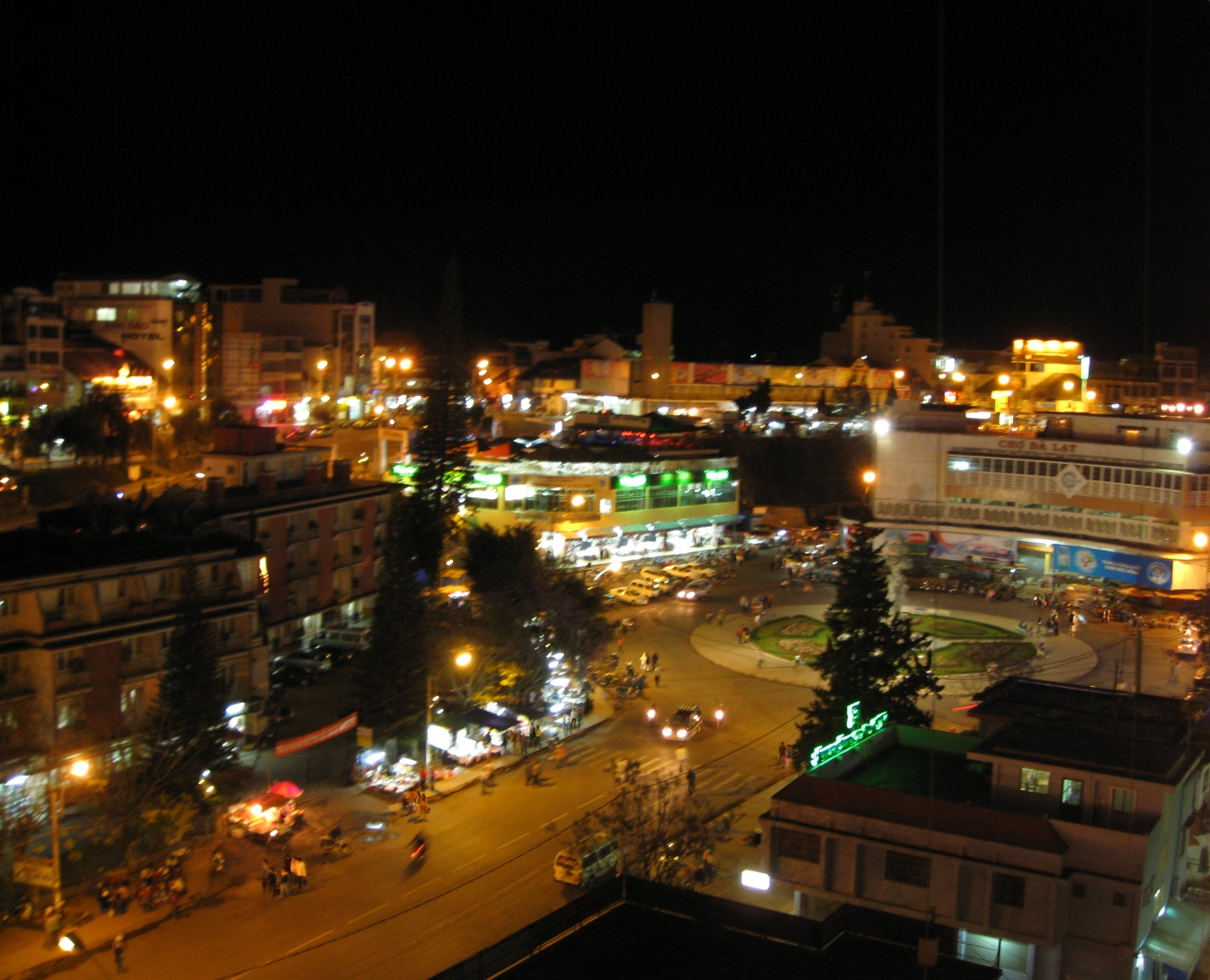
Da Lat Center Market during nighttime

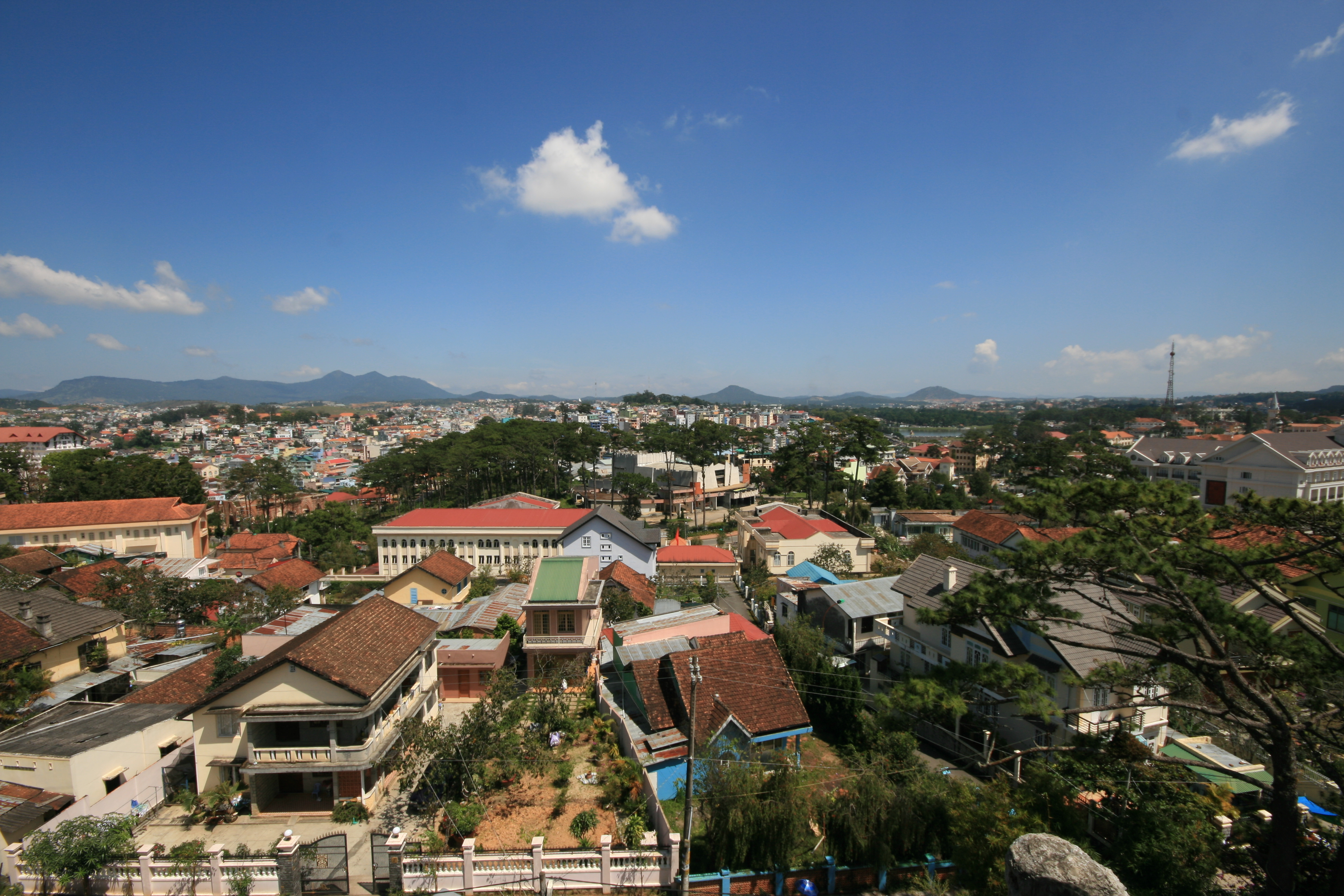
View of Da Lat

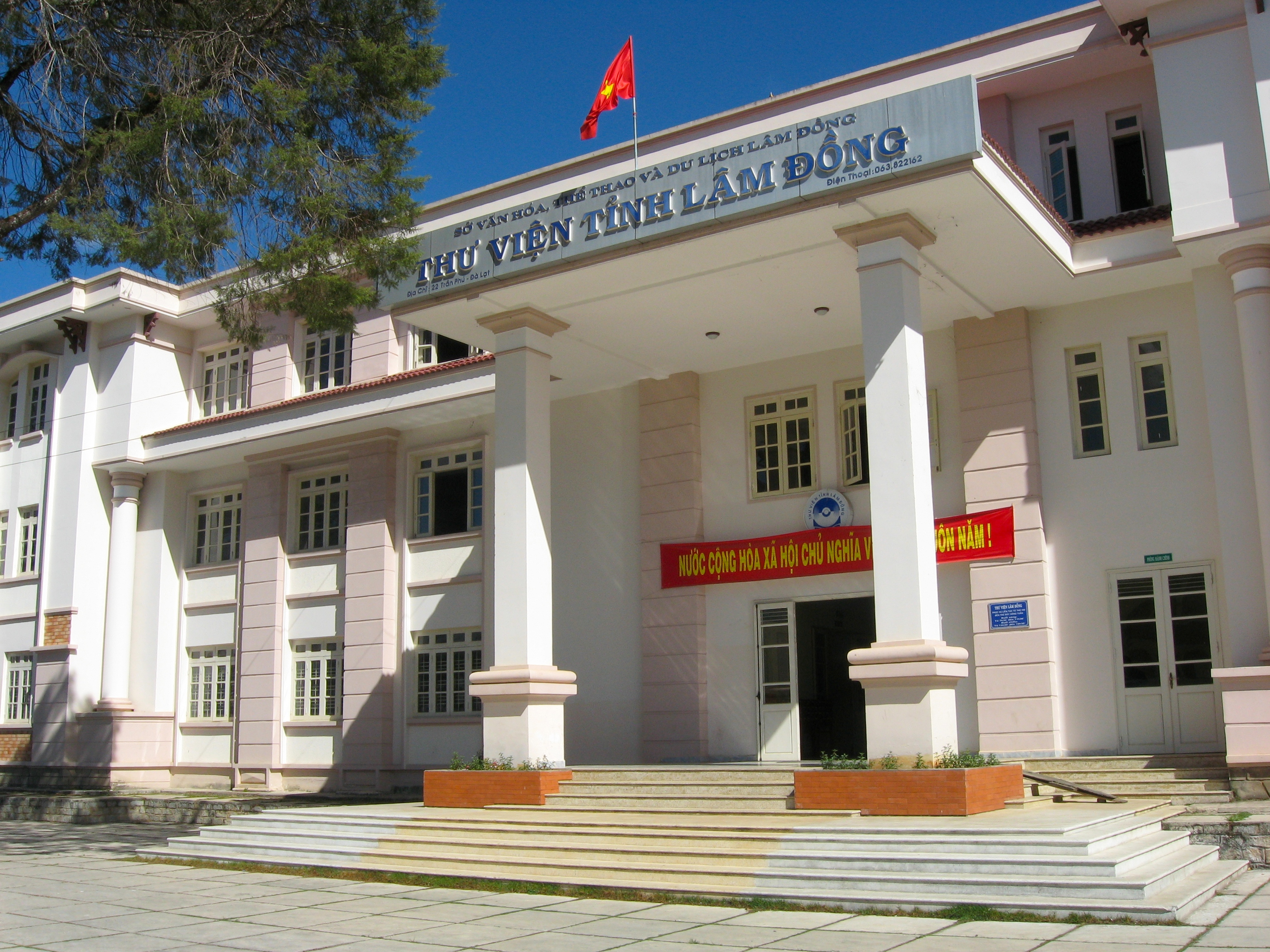
Lam Dong Library

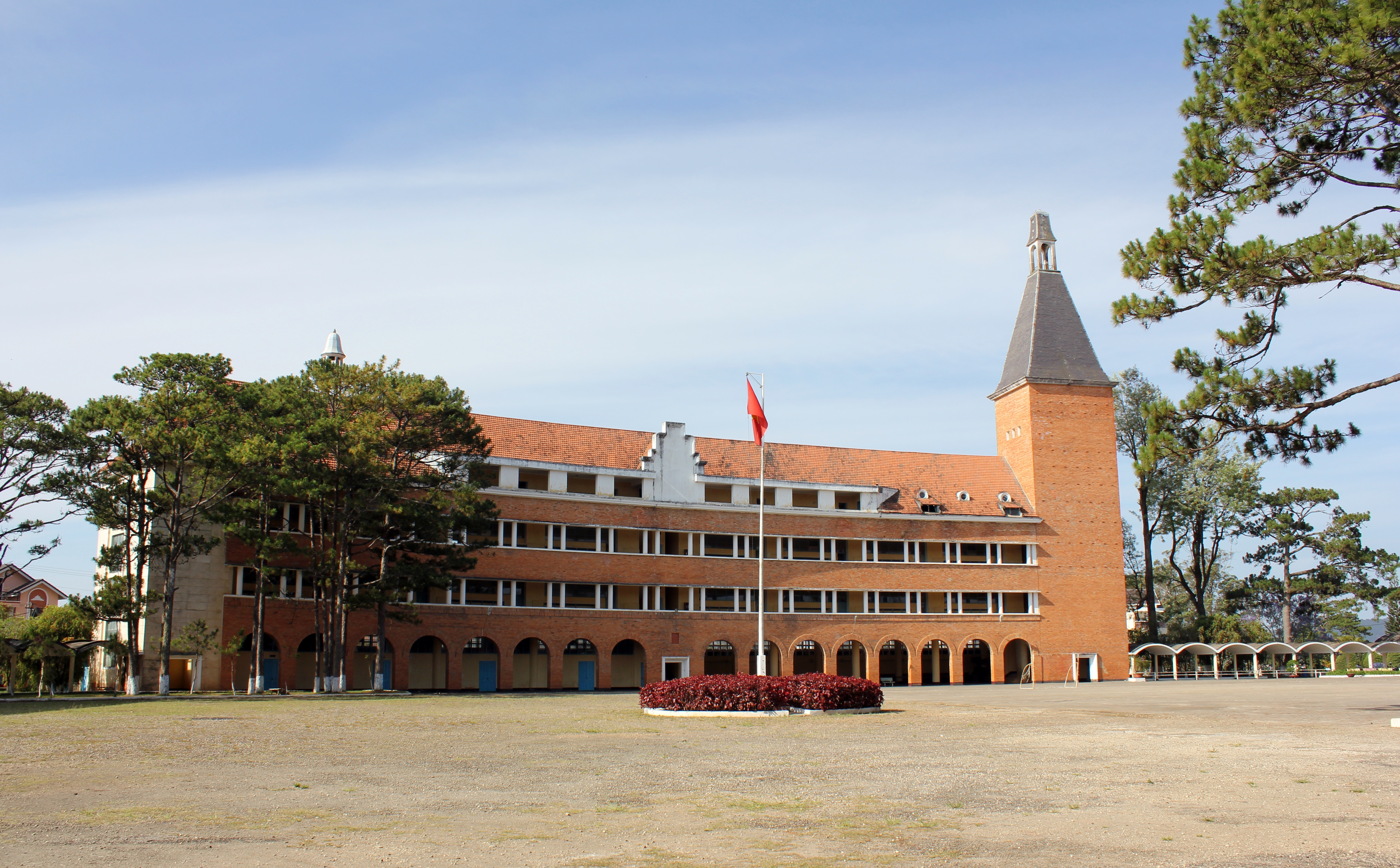
Dalat Teacher's College

== See also ==
- Da Lat–Thap Cham Railway
- Dalat Palace Hotel
