= Dinh III =

Historic mansion in Vietnam

- Dinh III Bảo Đại
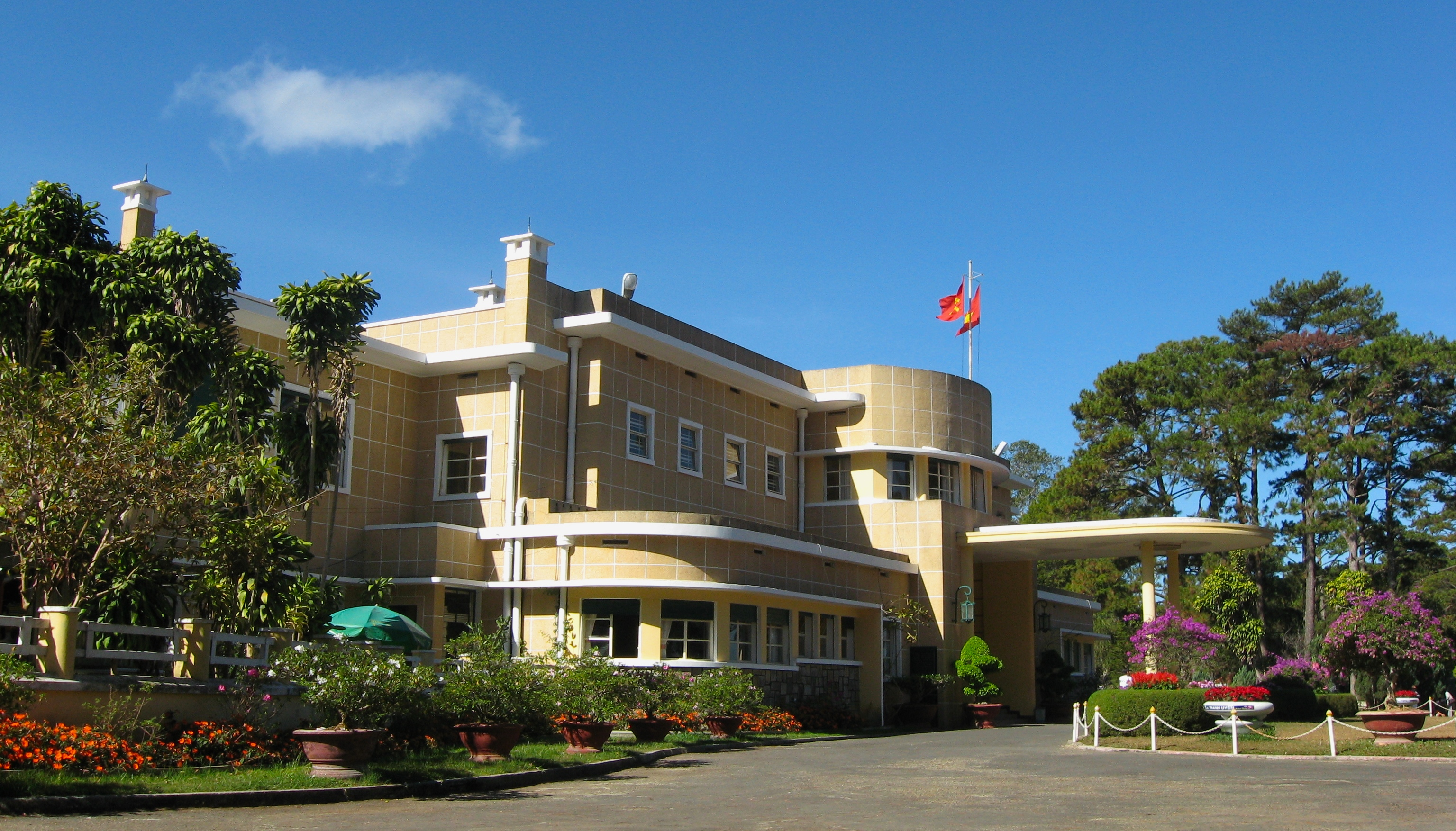

- Location within Vietnam
- Alternative names: Bao Dai Palace III

General information
- Architectural style: European colonial
- Location: Da Lat, Lam Dong Province, Vietnam
- Coordinates: 11°55′48″N 108°25′47″E
- Construction started: 1933
- Completed: 1938
- Client: Bao Dai
- Owner: Xuân Hương Tourism Service Company (since 2000)
- Governing body: Lâm Đồng Provincial Government

Technical details
- Floor count: 2

Design and construction
- Architects: Paul Veysseyre and Arthur Kruze

Dinh III, also known as Dinh Bảo Đại or Bao Dai Palace III, is a historic mansion in Da Lat, Vietnam. Constructed between 1933 and 1938, it functioned as the summer residence and administrative hub for Bao Dai, the final emperor of the Nguyen dynasty, alongside his family.

The structure exemplifies European colonial architecture integrated with Vietnam's highland landscape, and it now serves as a prominent cultural and tourist site preserving artifacts from the imperial era.

== History ==
Dinh III was commissioned as part of French urban planner Ernest Hébrard's vision for Da Lat, positioned on a hilltop in the Ái Ân forest at an elevation of approximately 1,539 meters. French architects Paul Veysseyre and Arthur Kruze designed the mansion, which became the primary summer retreat for Bao Dai, his consort Nam Phuong, and their children, including Crown Prince Bao Long.

Following the abdication of Bao Dai in 1945 and the establishment of the Republic of Vietnam, the mansion transitioned into a high-end resort for government officials under Presidents Ngo Dinh Diem and Nguyen Van Thieu. After the reunification of Vietnam in 1975, it fell under the management of the Lâm Đồng provincial finance and administration department until 2000, when oversight transferred to the Xuân Hương Tourism Service Company.

In 2019, French Ambassador Nicolas Warnery presented a digitized copy of the original architectural designs to the Lâm Đồng provincial authorities, enhancing preservation efforts.

== Architecture ==
Dinh III features a symmetrical European design with flat roofs, expansive gardens, and seamless integration with the surrounding pine forests. The ground floor includes formal spaces for receptions, banquets, offices, a library, and entertainment areas, with passages connecting interior rooms to outdoor terraces. A notable artifact is a painting of Angkor Wat gifted by Cambodian King Norodom Sihanouk.

The upper floor houses private family quarters, including bedrooms for Bao Dai, Nam Phuong, and their children (such as princes Bao Long and Bao Thang, and princesses Phuong Mai and Phuong Lien). A distinctive Moon Viewing Pavilion provides panoramic views for evening gatherings. The mansion also contains an underground wine cellar, hunting trophies (e.g., tiger skins and elephant tusks), and imperial artifacts relocated from the Hue court, some of which are displayed on-site while others reside in the Lâm Đồng Museum.

== Post-monarchy usage and tourism ==
Post-1975, Dinh III evolved into a cultural heritage site and major tourist draw, attracting visitors for its historical significance and architectural elegance. It is particularly popular during the autumn persimmon season, with nearby gardens offering seasonal fruit-picking experiences. Tourists are advised to prepare for Da Lat's rainy season, with the mansion serving as an indoor highlight amid misty highlands.

In 2023, adjacent land near Dinh III was proposed for auction, reflecting ongoing development in the area.
