= Domaine de Marie =

Catholic convent in Da Lat, Vietnam

Coordinates: 11.9495°N 108.4303°E

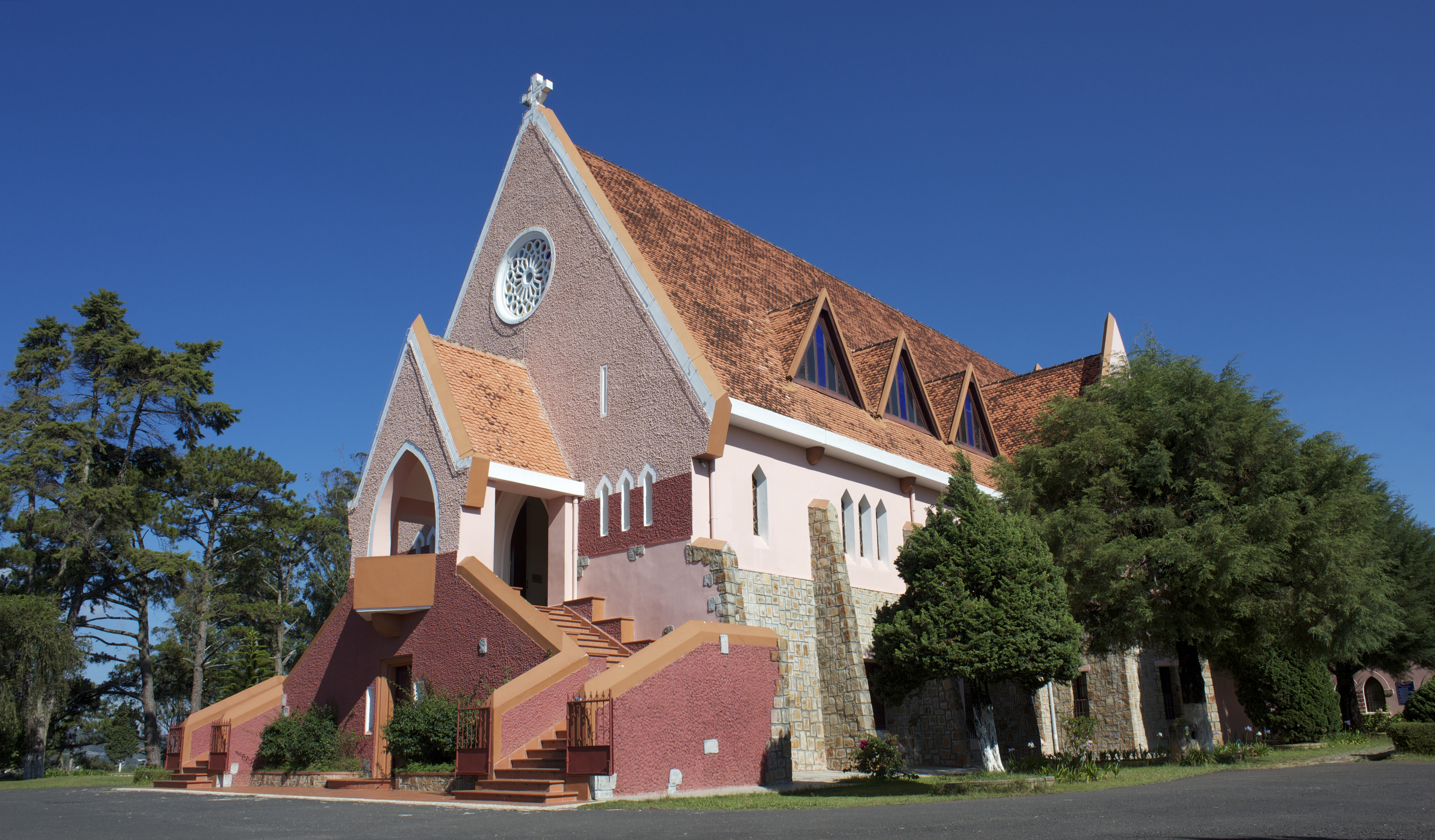
View of the church

The Domaine de Marie (French: [dɔmɛn də maʁi], "Dominion of Mary"; Vietnamese: Nhà thờ Domaine de Marie) is a Catholic convent in Da Lat, Vietnam. The church's history goes back to its initial construction in 1940 and is French and Vietnamese style of architecture. It is part of the Roman Catholic Diocese of Đà Lạt and contains a nunnery which operates schooling for local children.

== History ==
The construction of the complex started in 1940. The cathedral in the Domaine holds the remains of Suzanne Humbert, wife of Jean Decoux (Governor-General of French Indochina from July 1940 to 9 March 1945), who died in a traffic accident in 1944. Her tomb is located immediately behind the church lobby, situated in a spacious site with many flowers.

== Architecture ==
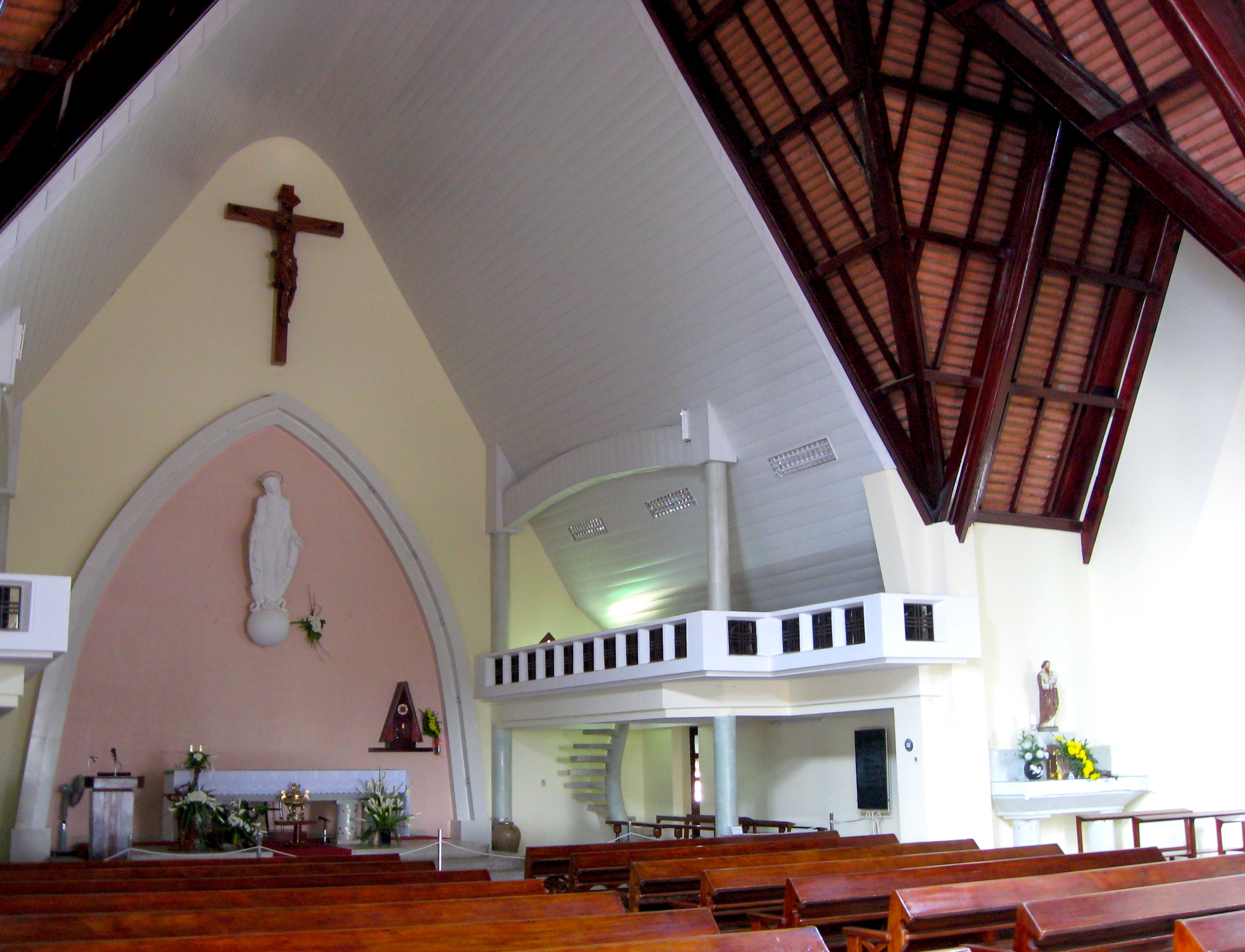
Church interior

The church is located atop a hill in Da Lat. It is built in a style reminiscent of 17th Century French architecture. The walls are made of pink limestone. The church features stained-glass windows and a large 3m of statue of the Virgin Mary standing upon a globe of the world. The statue resembles a Vietnamese woman and was designed by French architect Jonchère in 1943. It was donated by Mrs. Decoux. Nicknamed the "Cherry Church" by locals, it is described as a fusion of French and Vietnamese architecture. The French influence can be seen in the walls that allow a "creative manipulation of lights" with the various roofs of the complex designed in the style of the Nha Rong, a type of stilt house typical of the Central Highlands area of Vietnam. The church's façade is designed as an isosceles triangle and is noted for the number of small arch-shaped windows. A cross is located on top of the main triangular portion of the building. The church is part of a complex spanning 29.6 acres (12.0 ha), which also contains two convents.

== Religious use ==
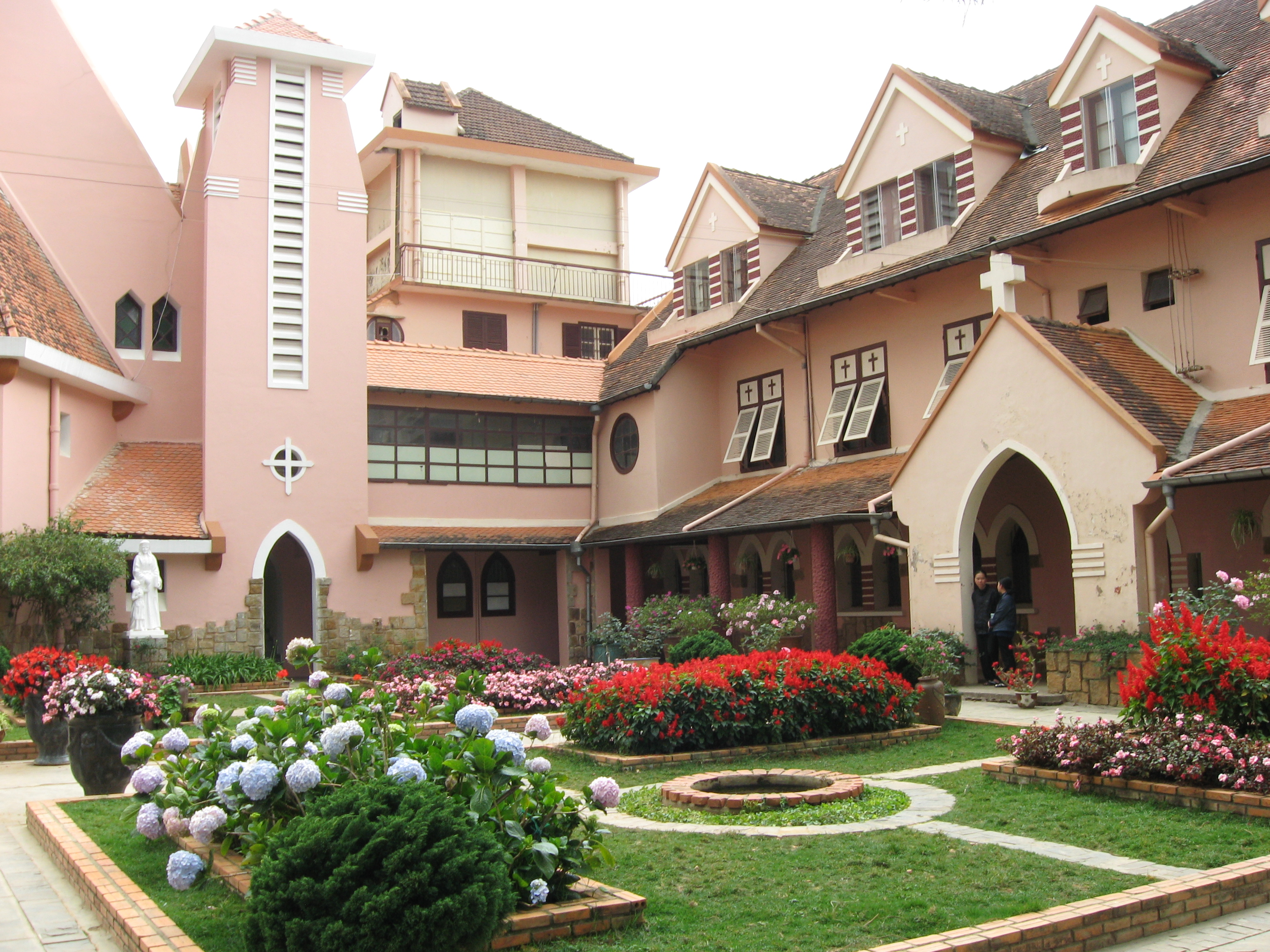
Cloister

As of 2007, 23 nuns of the order of the Daughters of Charity of Saint Vincent de Paul still live in the convent, along with numerous young women and children that are hard-of-hearing. The Daughters have been present in French Indo-China since 1940; two were sent to Dalat in 1941 to scout out an area to establish a convent. Having cleared the area on the top of the hill, 30 nuns arrived at the end of October 1941 from various locations around the French Indochinese colonies. When the church was inaugurated in November 1942 it had 60 nuns and a priest. Over the years the convent would accept Vietnamese girls who wished to join their order. They would also run an orphanage at the church; as of 2007 the church operates a kindergarten with 300 children. The revenue from this operation helps keep the Domaine open. The complex is part of the Roman Catholic Diocese of Đà Lạt.

== Worship services ==
As of 2015, the church still holds services weekdays at 17:00 and twice Sundays at 5:45 and 16:30.The facility is open to tourists and to the public.
