= Venezuelan cinema in the 1890s =

Overview of the introduction of cinema to Venezuela in the 1890s

Venezuela was introduced to cinema as a for-profit industry in the 1890s, when the medium became international. There were at least eight national films made in the decade, by three groups of filmmakers — one of the groups was based in Maracaibo and one was based in Caracas. The first film screening in the nation may have taken place as early as 1894, but is generally reported as 1896, with this later date being the first scheduled public screening.

== Introduction and reception ==
Unlike other countries where cinema came as a product of social development, cinema came to Venezuela, like most of Latin America, through two pathways; one with the locals only as the viewers, the other with them being viewed. The passive involvement of the continent with the development of film was described by Paulo Antonio Paranaguá, who referred to cinema at its arrival as "another foreign import".^{:99} The first path stemmed from rapidly developing modernity,^{:100–101} albeit in a relationship dependent on neo-colonialism by Western culture,^{:99} with Luis Manuel Méndez being employed to create electrical infrastructure resulting in him bringing a projector to Maracaibo.^{:42-43} The second was realized as Venezuela being a subject of films, with companies from France and the United States choosing to depict the country in their films for their own reasons: the interest of the exotic^{:100} and propaganda,^{:1} respectively.

While some films may have been shown in the nation in 1894 and 1895 by the Kinetoscope Company on a Kinetoscope, the first scheduled, multi-show, and completely public screenings took place in 1896 with a Vitascope operated by Manuel Trujillo Durán under the employ of Méndez.^{:42-44} Trujillo Durán travelled around Venezuela and then onto Colombia with the Vitascope projector films, screening in Venezuela between 11 July and 29 December 1896; as he was traveling he may have acquired new films from the company to show at different locations.^{:44-45} By the end of the century, two other cinema devices had been used in Venezuela: the Projectoscope and the Cinematograph.^{:10}

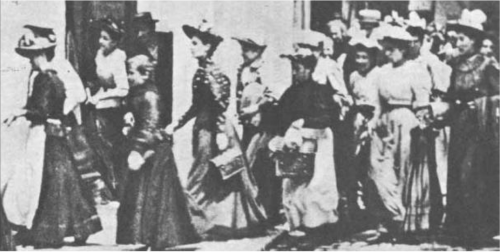
Crowds gather outside the Teatro Baralt, 11 July 1896.

Reviews in contemporary newspapers of film screenings have mentioned at least some of the films being well-received; The Monroe Doctrine was said to have been popular among its Venezuelan crowd for depicting their own political reality, and had a large group of people waiting outside the Baralt Theatre to watch it,^{:43-44} while Muchachos bañándose en la laguna de Maracaibo was "loudly applauded" at its debut.^{:28} (Note: Review text: "el descorrer de la cinta adolecía de alguna irregularidad y que la luz que daba sobre el bastidor no pareció bien dispuesta: así se borraban o confundían lastimosamente las figuras (aunque) los cuadros del Cinematógrafo parecieron buenos, muy particularmente el de los muchachos bañándose en el lago, que fue ruidosamente aplaudido" In English: "the drawing of the tape suffered from some irregularity and the light that it gave on the frame did not seem well disposed: this way the figures were erased or confused pitifully (though) the pictures of the cinematographer seemed good, very particularly that of the kids bathing in the lake, which was loudly applauded") Michelle Leigh Farrell of Georgetown University also writes in general that when projectors first arrived "the theaters in Maracaibo were filled to view both domestic and imported films".^{:21} However, author Stephen M. Hart suggests that the Venezuelan public quickly became uninterested in the films on offer, which were mostly the actuality films typical of the time, wanting something more exciting.^{:13}

A 1897 review of early Venezuelan films in the Maracaibo newspaper El Cronista reports on the projector being mishandled, saying that the tape seemed to stick, and mentions that the theatre was not well-lit to be able to see the film play very well.^{:28}

Azuaga García of the Universitat de Valencia analyzes media coverage of the early film screenings, contrasting the Venezuelan treatment with that of France by describing it as very warm,^{:29} writing that:

It can [...] be observed that, contrary to what happens in France, for example, the Venezuelan press welcomes the new invention, practically ignoring the limitations of the silent and black and white image that annoy so many European intellectuals and artists. In fact, the chroniclers of the Venezuelan cities where the cinematographer arrived not only enthusiastically comment on foreign films and national attempts, but programs are often published quite prominently.

— Jesús Ricardo Azuaga García, Pandemonium: La Filmografia de Roman Chalbaud en el Cine Venezolano: Contexto y Analisis p. 29

Yolanda Sueiro Villanueva of Central University of Venezuela looks at the reception afforded cinema upon its later arrival in Caracas. The newspaper reviews, here, show a different class of reporting: they remark on the technological advancements required to make the show happen and on the inherent quality of the medium of film, rather than the films themselves.^{:10} Sueiro Villanueva writes that:

When cinema arrives in Caracas, the press qualifies it as a technological marvel as well as a progressive advance; however, among the range of preexisting amusements, movies occupy one of the lowest seats. It's surprising, to say the least, to find press releases that praise the scientific qualities of the new spectacle and simultaneously consider it a very low quality event, almost a childish distraction.

— Yolanda Sueiro Villanueva, Inicios de la exhibición cinematográfica en Caracas (1896-1905) p. 10

Sueiro Villanueva also describes the Caracas press' reception of the films created by Carlos Ruiz Chapellín and Ricardo Rouffet, which were shown in a circus rather than the grand theatres and halls that previous screenings had occupied:^{:30} they were almost completely overlooked; only one newspaper mentions the films being shown, and does not elaborate beyond the titles.^{:71}

Separate from the existing filmmaking activity, a film circuit group was established in Caracas in 1899, which included the Teatro Caracas, the Circo Metropolitano, a small bar opposite the Circo, the Café La Francia, and the Socorro bodega. After this, cinematography exhibitions appear only sparsely in Venezuela until about 1907.^{:31} Farrell writes that in the 1890s Venezuela was a frontrunner in the industry of film within Latin America, a status it lost after the state became involved with production in the 20th century.^{:20-21}

== National films ==
Title	Director	Location	Genre	Subject
1897
Un célebre especialista sacando muelas en el gran Hotel Europa	unknown, possibly Manuel Trujillo Durán and Guillermo Trujillo Durán or Gabriel Veyre (Note: For information on the director debate, see the film's article.)	Maracaibo	Actualité; proto-horror	A dentist pulls the teeth from a man, in a luxurious hotel.^{:29}
Muchachos bañándose en la laguna de Maracaibo	unknown, possibly M. and G. Trujillo Durán or Veyre	Maracaibo	Actualité	Young people play in the shallows of Lake Maracaibo, with views of the city being also shown.^{:42}
Disputa entre Andracistas y Rojistas	unknown, possibly Carlos Ruiz Chapellín	Caracas	Documentary, political	Supporters of political rivals get into a fight in the run-up to an election.
Una paliza en el estado Sarría	unknown, likely Ricardo Rouffet and Ruiz	Caracas	Actualité	A fight breaks out in an impoverished area of Caracas.^{:32–37}
Carlos Ruiz peleando con un cochero	unknown, likely Ricardo Rouffet	Caracas	proto-Western	The titular entertainer, Carlos Ruiz Chapellín, gets into a fight with a coachman.^{:30}
1899
Joropo de negros en el Orinoco	Carlos Ruiz Chapellín	Caracas	Folk tale (joropo)^{:37}	A folk tale about native peoples of the Orinoco.^{:37}
Joropo Venezolano	Filippi Domini and Giuseppe Prateri		Folk tale (joropo)^{:37}	
La salida de la Misa de San Francisco	Filippi Domini and Giuseppe Prateri		Actualité^{:37}	Churchgoers leave after mass.^{:37}

== Influence and themes ==
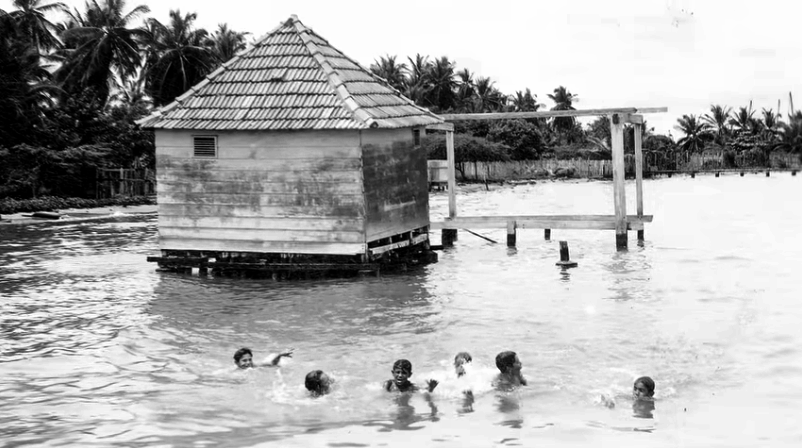
Boys enjoying a swim in Lake Maracaibo, a photo used in Muchachos bañándose...; the postcard-like imagery in the film is a reason for critics to believe the film was influenced by French actualité films^{:29}

The films available for Venezuelans to view when the technology arrived were "predominantly foreign", with this described as "a factor of tremendous significance" in terms of the development of national film.^{:103}^{:20-21} Hart looks at the French influence on the development of cinema in Venezuela; though the Lumières' representatives did not arrive in Venezuela until after the country had been exposed to many U.S. films through Méndez' Vitascope business,^{:42-44} Hart sees the Maracaibo-produced first films as being of the actualité genre.^{:13} Azuaga García describes Un célebre especialista... as "everyday", and Muchachos bañándose... as "like a view or postcard", both styles he believes are influenced by Lumière films.^{:29} Paul A. Schroeder Rodríguez of Amherst College agrees, denominating the Latin American body of films in this time as vistas,^{:22} a term literally meaning "views" and indeed used by some of the filmmakers themselves. (Note: As in an advertisement for a Carlos Ruiz Chapellín film quoted in Sueiro Villanueva p.71) Schroeder defines these vistas as actualités with the key element of their creators being prone to "experimentation", he claims because of their inexperience in the art.^{:22}

Farrell asserts that the Venezuelan film industry has been "struggl[ing] against cultural imperialism [...] since the arrival of film", and has always tried to create its own identity.^{:19-20} Along the lines of this innovative spirit, Elisa Martínez de Badra of the Universidad Católica Andres Bello posits the argument that Ruiz and W. O. Wolcopt's partnership producing slapstick films and the "staging" of Un célebre especialista... and Muchachos bañándose... were early examples of narrative and narrative-approaching films and influenced the development of films in the region to have fictional narratives early on.^{:67} Though Tom Gunning of the University of Chicago identifies early Latin American cinema as spectacle, a marker of the U.S. school of filmmaking,^{:103} Mártinez de Badra specifically separates the first Venezuelan films from those produced by Edison.^{:67}

A distinctly Latin American identity is further argued for by film historian Ana M. López; she also refers to the films as vistas, but notes the different context of the production. She argues that the everyday images of French actualité films would have been more thrilling and shocking for a Venezuelan audience, as they were foreign both geographically and culturally, so the Latin American productions modeled on them were culturally imbued with their own locations, traditions, and developments.^{:103-104} Venezuela does have some differences from its neighbors, though. One is that while López lists many of them replicating L'Arrivée d'un train en gare de La Ciotat with films featuring their own new public transportation, Venezuela cannot be counted among them.^{:104} Another is its inclusion in a different catalogue of thematically-linked early Latin American films in López' article; though there were a few "scientific" films, showing medical practices and including Un célebre especialista..., created to establish a more positive reputation for the medium of cinema, López writes that this practice was not as common as scholarship may see it to have been.^{:108-109}

Regarding the question of influence and identity, Paranaguá chooses a different ground. He refers to a "tripolar circulation" of cinema inspiration, with Latin America at one point of a triangle that connects to both the United States and Europe.^{:20}

== Timeline of film screenings ==
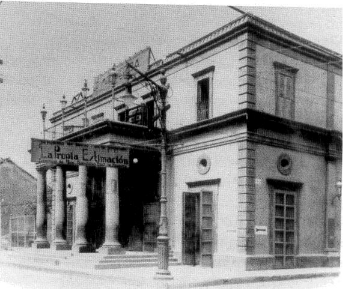
The Teatro Baralt in 1896, where the first films were shown

Some of the dates and film titles are dubious or questioned. (Note: As of 1997.) Information for the pre-1897 screenings are adapted from Memorias de Venezuela vol. 10, from information published in the book Panorama histórico del cine en Venezuela (Fundación Cinemateca Nacional, 1997); the records are from newspaper archives.^{:44}

The premiere of the first Venezuelan films, and the two other films shown, on 28 January 1897 are sourced from the introduction to Peter Rist's Historical dictionary of South American Cinema. Rodolfo Izaguirre has also suggested that more films were shown at the same time, but does not propose titles.^{:752} The films shown on 26 November 1897 are sourced to Azuaga García's analysis of national film. He also notes that there are records of Rouffet films mentioned in Caracas newspapers around this time, but there is "no assurance that these were presented to the public".^{:30}

The first screenings were relatively affordable, with the typical cost being between 1 and 20 bolívares depending on the seat.^{:42-43}^{:26} The equivalent in United States dollar at the time was 5.18 Bs. to US$1, (Note: See Currency history of Venezuela.) giving the expenses in USD at the time as between 19c and $3.86.

Key
^{?}	Denotes information that is dubious

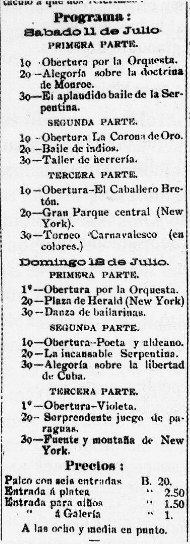
A Maracaibo newspaper publishes times and prices for the first film screenings in July 1896

Date	Film(s)	Location	Notes
24 September 1894	Buffalo Dance^{?}	unknown	
After April 1895	The Indian short stick dance^{?}	unknown	
April–May 1896^{?}	Serpentine^{?}	unknown	Second version
11 July 1896	Alegoría sobre la doctrina de Monroe	Maracaibo	Set in Venezuela, but produced by the Edison Company (United States)^{:44}
11 July 1896	La Serpentina	Maracaibo	In color
11 July 1896	Baile de Indios/Fiesta de Indios	Maracaibo	
11 July 1896	Un taller de herrería	Maracaibo	
11 July 1896	Gran Parque central (Nueva York)	Maracaibo	
11 July 1896	Torneo Carnavalesco	Maracaibo	
12 July 1896	Plaza del Herald (Nueva York)	Maracaibo	
12 July 1896	Danza de las bailarinas	Maracaibo	
12 July 1896	La incansable Serpentina^{?}	Maracaibo	Not in source; in film listing to right
12 July 1896	Alegoría sobre la libertad de Cuba	Maracaibo	
12 July 1896	Sorprendente juego de paraguas	Maracaibo	In color
12 July 1896	Fuentes y montañas de Nueva York	Maracaibo	
5 September 1896	Baile de escoceses	Caracas	
5 September 1896	Escena en una cervecería	Caracas	
5 September 1896	Mariposa blanca	Caracas	
5 September 1896	La mariposa cubana/Mariposas de leche	Caracas	
5 September 1896	Incendio en Nueva York y salvación de la victimas	Caracas	
8 September 1896	Lucha entre los grandes boxeadores Corbett y Courtney	Caracas	
8 October 1896	El baile de las palomitas	Valencia	
9 October 1896	Sorpresa de unos jugadores por la policía	Valencia	
7 December 1896	La cuerda de monos/Danza de monos	Maracaibo	
29 December 1896	Ejercicio de carrera por la caballería americana	Maracaibo	
29 December 1896	La cremación de Juana de Arco	Maracaibo	In color
29 December 1896	Ecos del carnaval	Maracaibo	In color
29 December 1896	Baño natural/Baño matinal	Maracaibo	
29 December 1896	El camaleón	Maracaibo	Serpentine second take
29 December 1896	Sun dance	Maracaibo	Second version
29 December 1896	El incendio de una casa cochera	Maracaibo	
28 January 1897	Los Campos Elíseos	Maracaibo	
28 January 1897	Un célebre especialista sacando muelas en el gran Hotel Europa	Maracaibo	First Venezuelan-made film shown in the country
28 January 1897	Muchachos bañándose en la laguna de Maracaibo	Maracaibo	
28 January 1897	La llegada de un tren	Maracaibo	
26 June to 14 July 1897	Unknown	Caracas	Screenings at Circo Metropolitano^{:61-64}
August 1897	Unknown	Caracas	Screening by Veyre at Salón de la Fortuna^{:29}
26 November 1897	Una paliza en el estado Sarría	Caracas	
26 November 1897	Carlos Ruiz peleando con un cochero	Caracas	
14 March 1899	Pasión y muerte de Nuestro Señor Jesucristo	Caracas	Screening at the Archbishop's Palace^{:31}
