= Venezuelan cinema in the 1900s =

Cinema

Venezuela had been introduced to cinema in the 1890s. After an initial boom in screenings and production, the presence of cinema in the nation was lower between 1900 and 1910.

== Industry development ==
A film circuit was established in Caracas in 1899, which included the Teatro Caracas, the Circo Metropolitano, a small bar opposite the Circo, the Café La Francia, and the Socorro bodega. After this, cinema appears only sparsely until about 1907.^{:31} Farrell writes that in the 1890s Venezuela was a frontrunner in the industry of film within Latin America, a status it lost after the state became involved with production in the 20th century.^{:20-21}

It is in 1907 that contemporary evidence exists, through newspaper reviews, of more national films being created. These films were still vistas, depicting everyday activities of the common people, with an aim to "[win] the favor of the public and that of the tyrannical authorities of the time".^{:31} The filmmakers were also active in making propaganda for the government.^{:31} Some of the subjects of the reemergence of 1907 include "national holidays, bullfights, events, sports, views of places of the national territory and official events".^{:10}

For a few days, beginning on 30 November 1900, a Bioscope was presented by W. H. Whiteman in the Hotel Bolívar of Ciudad Bolívar.^{:38} These screenings were so popular that the public in the city wrote to the newspaper to ask the show to be transferred to the Teatro Bolívar, where the zarzuela performances were cancelled to allow this to happen.^{:38} The first sound films of the country were shown by the Frenchman G. Romegout on 31 August 1901, operating a gramophone at the same time as the projector.^{:67-68}

Cinema did not reappear in Caracas until the end of 1901; in the 1890s, Carlos Ruiz Chapellín had shown films in various venues, filling them with theatre during 1900.^{:87} However, the resurgence of the cinema here, being shown at the Teatro Municipal of Caracas, was not as popular. In November 1901, El Tiempo wrote:

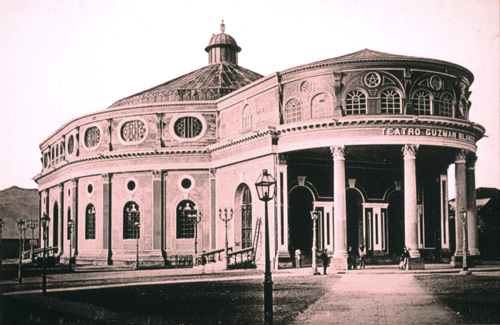
The Teatro Municipal of Caracas at the time

Although the vistas that are currently exhibited in the Municipal are regular, and the spectacle is innocent, it has seemed a condescension, in the least, to allocate our main coliseum for these functions [...] We have always believed that the Municipal, for being the best we have, should only be used for the opera, for concerts or for well-organized dramatic companies [...] for the masses there is the Teatro Caracas and the Calcaño.

— in Inicios de la exhibición cinematográfica en Caracas (1896-1905), Yolanda Sueiro Villanueva^{:90}

From 1902 through 1904, the screenings of films again became minimal.^{:132} Additionally, most halls used for showing films did not have permanent facilities for the function, being limited to the Baralt Theatre in Maracaibo and Teatro Municipal in Valencia; in 1904, the Teatro Municipal in Barquisimeto was the main location for cinema in this region, with other areas using commercial public buildings like cafés and hotels for screenings.^{:37}

The pioneer Manuel Trujillo Durán had returned to photography until 1902; in August 1903 he was working with fellow Zulian Alfredo Duplat in San Cristóbal, Táchira on films, traveling through the state after showing films in Cúcuta.^{:55} A report in the newspaper Horizontes announced that they were showing films that they had directed.^{:55} Trujillo Durán continued to work in film through the decade, but sparsely: he operated projectors at several locations, including as the duo 'Trujillo & March' at the Baralt Theatre, where he is documented in 1906 and 1908; at the University of the Andes in 1907; and around the country for Pathé in 1908 and 1909.^{:55}

In 1905, film screenings emerged again in Caracas. Ruiz Chapellín, who had been the main film entrepreneur in the city, was replaced in this position by Carlos Badaracco; seen as a more gentile person, Badaracco's presence and the ability from 1904 to rent films from U.S. companies rather than buy them outright led to more investors in cinema. Badaracco created the Empresa Nacional and guidelines to film projection in 1905, making it an official job.^{:122} Badaracco would work as a professional projectionist until the end of the decade.

This year, a company owned by the Ireland brothers began showing a hundred films that they had imported at the Municipal in Caracas; though a renowned company, the shows left the Municipal starting on 25 April 1905, with the reason that the Circo Metropolitano could hold the much larger audiences they were attracting. The Irelands also introduced different film seasons through the year, and held a special screening on 27 April 1905 with then-Vice President Juan Vicente Gómez in attendance, their last show at the Municipal, though running concurrently with their regular programming at the Circo.^{:100} Other companies were formed in the decade. In 1908, after the Baralt brothers of Maracaibo relocate to Caracas, the Baralts worked with the Delhom brothers and the two sets of siblings formed a company together. Though it dissolved a year later, the Delhoms continued to make films for another five years, with Manuel Delhom making at least a dozen in 1908.^{:11}

In 1908, the government of Carabobo had several films made commemorating the 5 July 1811 act of Independence. These were screened at the Gaumont Cinema in Valencia, shortly before President Cipriano Castro left the country.^{:11}

== National films ==
| Title | Director | Genre | Subject | Notes |
|---|---|---|---|---|
1901
| Diálogos de Tirabeque y Pelegrín^{:40} | G. Romegout, a Lumière worker^{:40} | | The popular cartoon characters Tirabeque and Pelegrín^{:40} | First certain fiction and first sound film made in Venezuela^{:40} |
| Bailes populares^{:37} | Romegout^{:37}^{:67} | Folktale^{:37} | | Featuring sound^{:67} |
| Coplas de Gedeón^{:67} | Romegout^{:67} | | | Featuring sound^{:67} |
1903
| Unknown (likely multiple)^{:55} | Manuel Trujillo Durán and Alfredo Duplat^{:55} | | | Possibly made in Colombia; shown in Venezuela by Venezuelans (13-27 August)^{:55} |
1908
| 5 de Julio or 5 de Julio: Película Criolla^{:33-34} | Manuel Ignacio Baralt, Servio Tulio Baralt and Manuel Delhom^{:33-34} | Documentary | The acts surrounding the signing of the Venezuelan Declaration of Independence, including "Tram travel, the arrival of a train in Valencia, Esquina de San Francisco, traveling by car in El Paraíso, official acts, Yellow House, the National Pantheon and Palacio Federal"^{:34} | Made in honor of the president of Carabobo state, Dr. Samuel E. Niño^{:34} |
| Las Trincheras-Valencia^{:34} | S. T. Baralt and M. Delhom^{:34} | Documentary | Showing the visit of President Cipriano Castro to Las Trincheras^{:34} | |
1909
| Carnival in Caracas^{:11} | M. A. Gonhom and Augusto González Vidal^{:11} | Documentary | Showing the carnival in Caracas^{:11} | Said to be filmed on primitive cameras, but enjoyed by the audience who wanted to see the subject^{:11} |
