= Un célebre especialista sacando muelas en el gran Hotel Europa =

First Venezuelan film (1897)

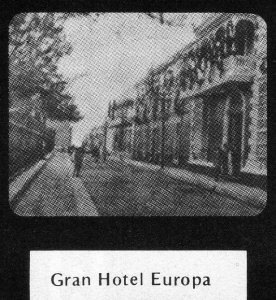
- Frame from the film
- Directed by: Unknown; possibly Manuel Trujillo Durán or Gabriel Veyre
- Release date: 28 January 1897
- Country: Venezuela

Un célebre especialista sacando muelas en el gran Hotel Europa (English: A celebrated specialist pulling teeth at the grand Hotel Europa) was the first Venezuelan film. It was screened at the Baralt Theatre in Maracaibo, Zulia on 28 January 1897 as the second in a film block of four; (Note: The first film in the block was the French Les Champs-Élysées.) the block also featured another film from Maracaibo (Muchachos bañándose en la laguna de Maracaibo: English: Children bathing at the lagoon of Maracaibo). Little is known about the film's production, and scholars are uncertain of the identity of its director.

No complete copies of the original film survive. During the 2010s, a reconstruction of the film was produced in Venezuela with preserved photographs from the original. In the film, a dental surgeon at the Hotel Europa in Maracaibo pulls a man's teeth. Although the subject matter could make it an early horror film, scholars agree that the film was an actuality film.

A contemporary reviewer criticized the screening for its inappropriate projection speed and theatre lighting, but gave praise to the film.

== Film content ==
As suggested by its title, the film depicts a "celebrated" surgeon pulling a patient's teeth at the Hotel Europa in Maracaibo. The story was described by the film historian Ana López as "a somewhat precarious dental extraction". Jesús Ricardo Azuaga García described the film as being stylistically similar to Lumière films (possibly emulating them), saying that it illustrates "one of those more or less everyday activities that the French film pioneers used to show in their films". Azuaga García notes that this was to be unusual for early Venezuelan film, and cites only three examples. (Note: The first of these three is Un célebre especialista.... The other two are La salida de la Misa de San Francisco, an 1899 film by Filippi Domini and Giuseppe Prateri, and Domingos Caraqueños, made by Lucas Manzano and Enrique Zimmermann in 1918.)

Although no copies of the film were preserved, the Venezuelan Association of Film Exhibitors produced a part-reconstruction of Un celebre especialista sacando muelas en el gran Hotel Europa (English: A celebrated specialist pulling teeth at the grand Hotel Europa) and Muchachos bañándose en la laguna de Maracaibo (English: Children bathing in the lagoon of Maracaibo) in January 2017 for the 120th anniversary of their premieres. The association collected frames from the 1890s which had been stored in the Zulia Photographic Archive, restoring and adding color to the images to recreate the approximate look of the films. Abdel Güerere wrote and produced the restoration, which was directed by Emiliano Faría. A 1991 DVD history of Venezuelan cinema referred to the film; the DVD included an image of the extraction and one of the Hotel Europa. (Note: The images relating to the film were included on disc 3.)

The identity of the dentist featured in the film is not known. The Diccionario General de Zulia identifies Vicente Toledo as the only well-known dentist in late 19th-century Venezuela. The 1897 Commercial Directory of American Republics cites two registered dentists in Maracaibo: Elias A. Capriles and Gaspar Elias González. González was the inaugural president of the Fraternidad Odontológica del Zulia (English: Zulian Organization of Dentistry) in 1916. The Hotel Europa, which features in the film, was sold and remodeled as the Hotel Zulia in 1913; it was ultimately demolished in 1956, and the site used to build the Maracaibo Municipal Council building.

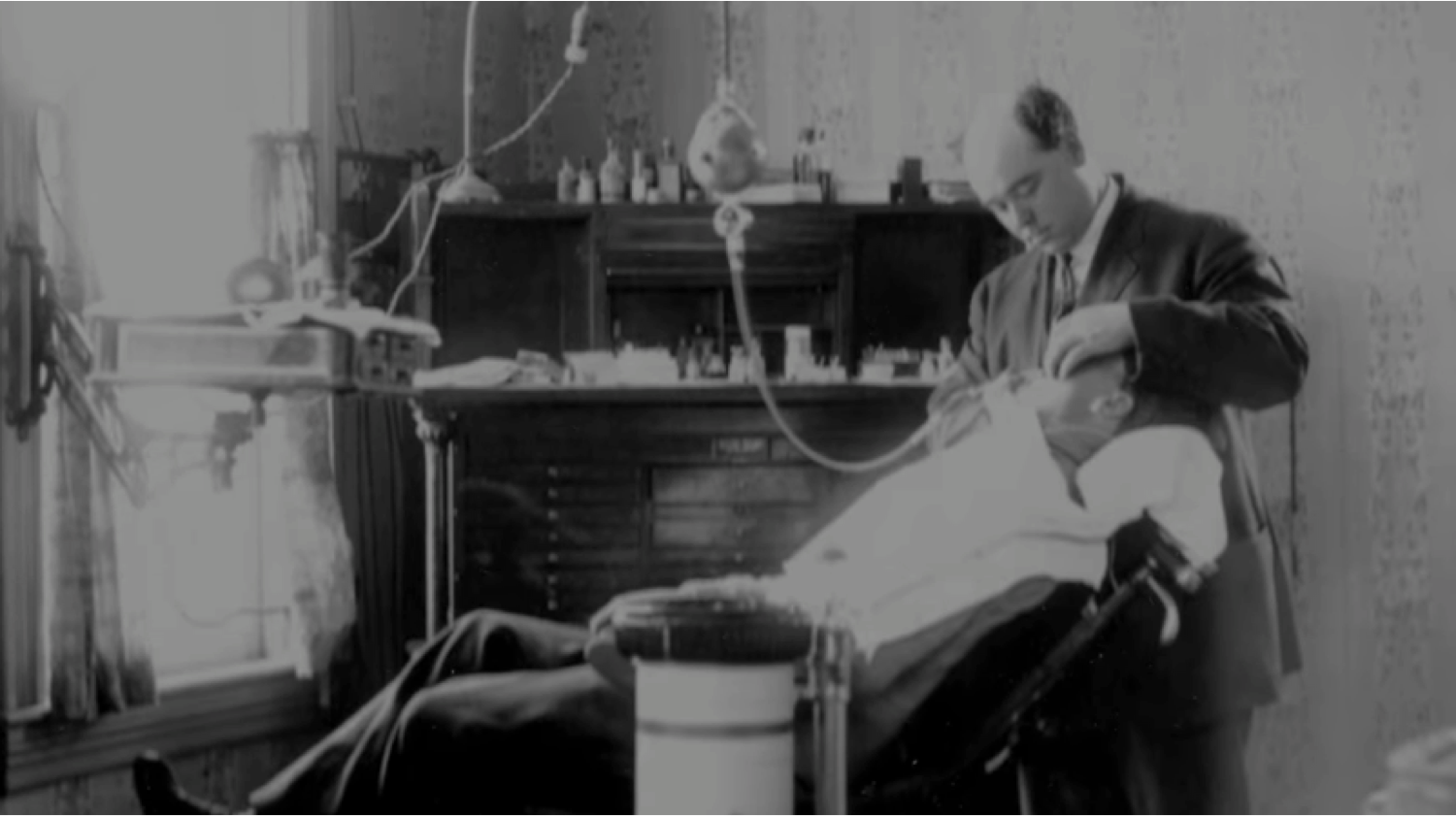
A still of dental extraction used in the reconstructed film

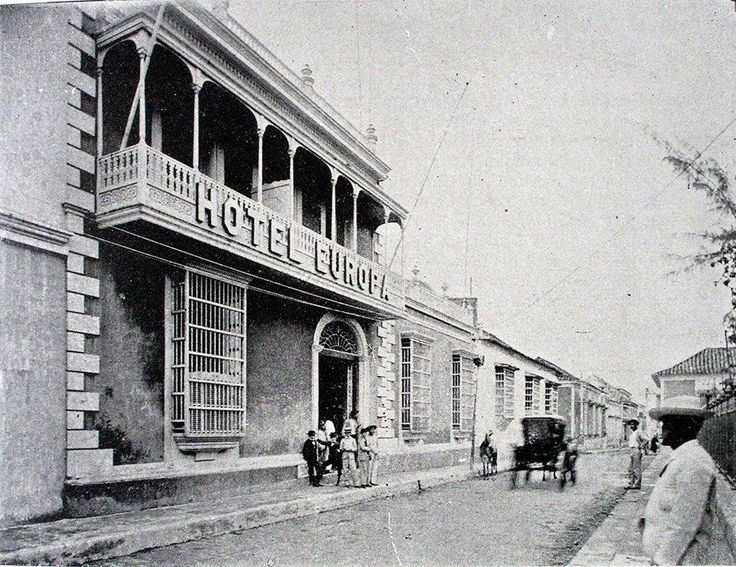
The Hotel Europa in Maracaibo, around the time the film was made

== Screening ==
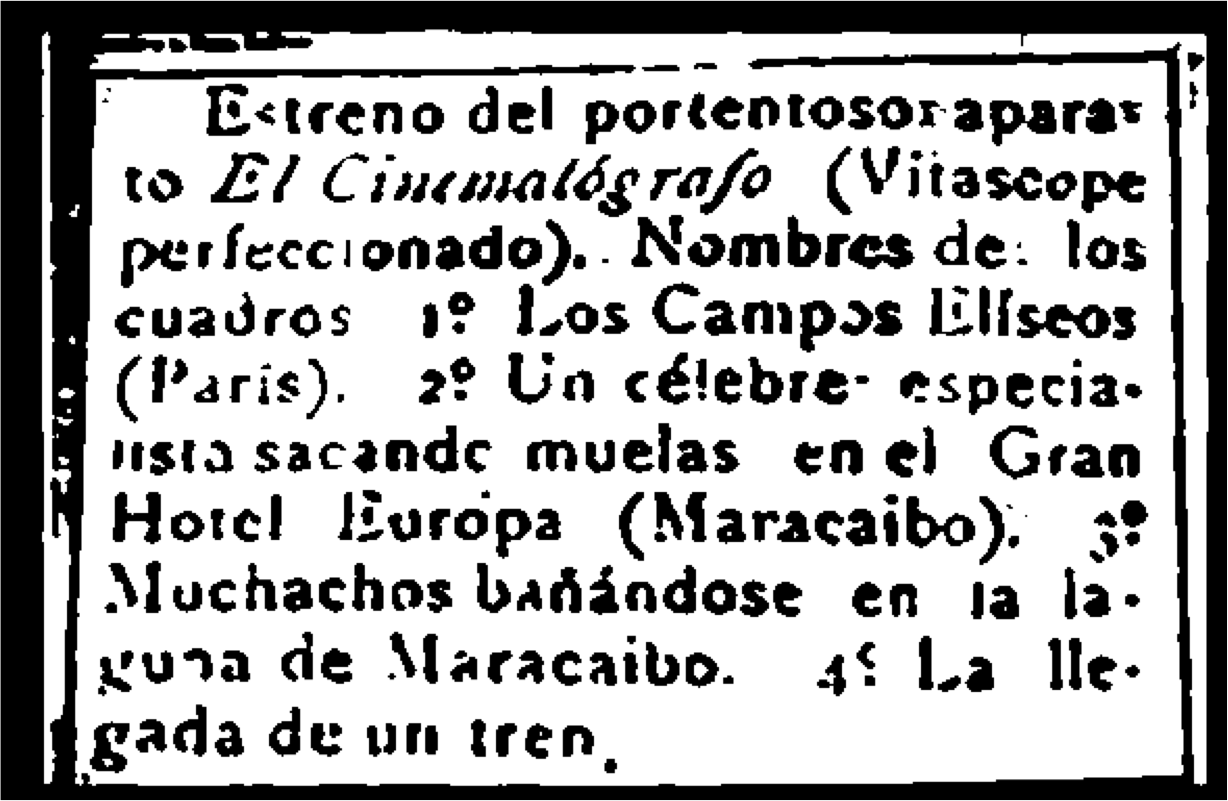
Newspaper clipping announcing the showing of the films (Note: The clipping reads: * Premiere of the portentous device The Cinematographer (perfected Vitascope). Names of the shows: 1st The Champs Elysees (Paris). 2nd A celebrated specialist pulling teeth in the Great Hotel Europa (Maracaibo). 3rd Children bathing at Lake Maracaibo. 4th The arrival of a train. ** Spanish: Estreno del portentoso aparato El Cinematógrafo (Vitascope perfeccionado). Nombres de los cuadros 1° Los Campos Elíseos (Paris). 2° Un célebre especialista sacando muelas en el Gran Hotel Europa (Maracaibo). 3° Muchachos bañándose en la laguna de Maracaibo. 4° La llegada de un tren.)

The film screening of Un célebre especialista sacando muelas en el gran Hotel Europa took place on 28 January 1897 at 7:00 pm at the Teatro Baralt in Maracaibo, where the first films shown in the country (imported American short films) had been screened. Another Venezuelan film, Muchachos bañándose en la laguna de Maracaibo, was also shown; this film depicted people bathing at Lake Maracaibo and views of the city. Two French films made by the Lumière brothers were also screened. One of these, shown last of the four, was the famous L'Arrivée d'un train en gare de La Ciotat. According to film historian Peter Rist, these films were projected on this occasion by Gabriel Veyre, a film director and projectionist for the Lumière company. Rodolfo Izaguirre has suggested that in addition to the Venezuelan and French films, American films by Thomas Edison were shown as well. The films were screened after a performance of Gaetano Donizetti's opera, La favorita.

A contemporary review in El Cronista noted that the films seemed to have been made well, but their screening was poorly executed. The reviewer noted that the projection speed of the films was initially irregular and the theatre lighting was too bright for films. (Note: "The drawing of the tape suffered from some irregularity and the light that it gave on the frame did not seem well disposed: this way the figures were erased or confused pitifully [though] the pictures of the cinematographer seemed good, very particularly that of the children bathing in the lake, which was loudly applauded." ** Spanish: "El descorrer de la cinta adolecía de alguna irregularidad y que la luz que daba sobre el bastidor no pareció bien dispuesta: así se borraban o confundían lastimosamente las figuras (aunque) los cuadros del Cinematógrafo parecieron buenos, muy particularmente el de los muchachos bañándose en el lago, que fue ruidosamente aplaudido.")

== Production and director ==
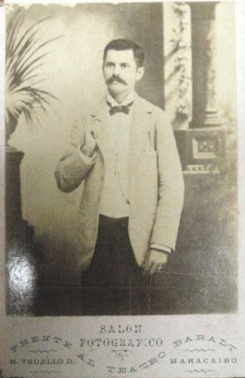
A portrait of Manuel Trujillo Durán at the time.

The director of the film is unknown; scholars and researchers have suggested that the most likely people to be the director would be Manuel Trujillo Durán, a photographer from Maracaibo, or Veyre, the French traveling filmmaker. Film scholar, lecturer and Trujillo biographer Alexis Fernández discussed the production of the first films in a 2013 television interview, agreeing that there is no tangible evidence indicating who the director was.

For many years, film scholarship believed Trujillo had brought the Vitascope to Venezuela. Sources have also suggested that Trujillo, with or without his brother Guillermo, (Note: Guillermo was a nationally-recognized poet and politician, whom assisted Manuel with his business ventures.) made the early films. Though it was determined that Trujillo did not introduce the Vitascope, (Note: A business partner, Luis Manuel Méndez, is credited with this.) the associated belief that he made the first films has persisted in some parts of Venezuela. By 2018, it was generally accepted in local and national Venezuelan media that Trujillo did not make the film.

The likelihood of Trujillo being the director has been a subject of debate among Venezuelan film scholars. Those who dispute it refer to evidence that shows Trujillo probably did not have a camera with the capability to make films, and the fact that he was in Táchira at the time of the screening. On the other side, proponents of Trujillo as director note his proximity to the introduction of Venezuelan film and his relationship with American camera companies. Veteran Venezuelan film critic Rodolfo Izaguirre says that the films are "presumed" to be made by him, and Venezuelan film histories that support Trujillo note that "it is said" he was the director. Outside of analysis, an article in the newspaper Últimas Noticias about National Film Day events in January 2019 celebrated Trujillo for making and projecting the film himself and outfitting the Baralt Theatre so the films could be shown.

Proposing another director in 2018, Jesús Ángel Semprún Parra and Luis Guillermo Hernández wrote that the French camera operator and filmmaker Veyre was more likely to have made the film. They come to this view by noting that, while Trujillo left Maracaibo en route to Colombia in early January 1897, Veyre and his associate C. F. Bernard arrived in Venezuela in January 1897 as part of their filmmaking tour of Latin America and the Caribbean. In a 2014 profile of Veyre, Venezuelan film professor Arturo Serrano wrote that he made no films in Venezuela.

== Modern critical views ==
Ana López suggests that Un célebre especialista... may be not only the first Venezuelan film, but may also contain "the earliest views shot in Latin America", though Evangelina Soltero Sánchez suggests earlier dates for films produced elsewhere in South America.

López writes that the subject of dental surgery, similar to "a few" other early Latin American films, created "a veneer of scientific objectivity [that] perfectly rationalized its more thrilling appeals" and gave a contemporary audience justification for watching a film when they were otherwise considered spectacles. However, López notes that the prevailing scholarly narrative that many Latin American films had science-related themes is inaccurate; she cites four films related to science, only one of which was produced after 1900. She suggests that films produced in Latin America were influenced by the upcoming 1900 Paris Exposition, where they might be shown.

In his book, Latin American Cinema: A Comparative History, Paul A. Schroeder Rodríguez describes early Latin American films as generally reflective of "the air of self-sufficiency of the early pioneers, as if they were looking at themselves and liked what they saw" and cited Un célebre especialista... as an example that "speak[s] for [itself]". Stephen M. Hart provides an insight into the cool welcome given the film in his book, saying that whilst it fit the mold of the actualité – a short film demonstrating actual events – audiences were quickly numbed by seeing many of these in succession and began "craving more interesting material than [...] a dentist's antics".

Michelle Leigh Farrell discusses 20th-century Venezuelan cinema in her 2011 paper, noting its lack of presence and marginal influence in South America despite Venezuela having produced some of the first Latin American films. Farrell believes that this early success influenced the Venezuelan government to capitalize on the early films, monopolizing the industry with poorly managed production companies which made newsreels and films supporting the government. Michael Chanan suggests that although Venezuela was typical of Latin American nations (many of which did not continue their early production of entertainment films), there may be a rich trove of hidden independent films – such as the works of Edgar J. Anzola – which have been missing for decades.

Elisa Martínez de Badra compares the film to its few predecessors, writing that the Edison films shown in Maracaibo in 1896 were "theatrical spectacle" but Un célebre especialista... was not; she describes it as "new media". Martínez adds that the form of Un célebre especialista... and Muchachos bañándose... is one of two factors that contributed to the development of a narrative approach in Venezuelan cinema. (Note: The other factor she mentions is the partnership of Carlos Ruiz Chapellín and W. O. Wolcopt, who created early films that could be considered slapstick comedy.)

Examining The House at the End of Time as the first Venezuelan horror film, Robert Gómez suggests that Un célebre especialista... may actually hold this position: "It's not for no reason that the figure of the dentist exists in lots of B-movies and art films as the character that uses his office to torture victims. Think Marathon Man." Gómez adds that although the unknown director was not making a genre film, "one can not ignore the reaction of the spectator, who probably saw in it, as is natural, a terrifying story in the same way that many spectators reacted to L'Arrivée d'un train en gare de La Ciotat by the Lumière brothers".

== Sources ==
Literature

- Azuaga García, Jesús Ricardo (September 2015). Pandemonium: La Filmografia de Roman Chalbaud en el Cine Venezolano: Contexto y Analisis [Pandemonium: The Filmography of Roman Chalbaud and the Cinema of Venezuela] (PDF) (Thesis) (in Spanish). Universitat de Valencia.
- Calvo, Guadi (2003). "Román Chalbaud: La voz definitiva" [Román Chalbaud: The definitive voice]. Archipielago. Revista cultural de nuestra América (in Spanish). 11 (41).
- Carro, Nelson (1997). "Un siglo de cine en América Latina" [A century of Latin American cinema]. Política y Cultura (in Spanish). 8.
- Chanan, Michael (1996). "Section 2, Sound Cinema 1930-1960 "Cinema in Latin America"". In Nowell-Smith, Geoffrey (ed.). The Oxford History of World Cinema. Oxford University Press. ISBN 978-0198742425.
- Correa, Luzmar; Jerez, Zuhé; Rojas, Ana (April 2011). Castillo, Jorge (ed.). Documental sobre el inicio de las casas productoras de cine en Venezuela [Document about the beginnings of the production houses of Venezuelan cinema] (PDF) (Thesis) (in Spanish). Universidad Católica Andrés Bello. Archived from the original (PDF) on 6 December 2019.
- Farrell, Michelle Leigh (24 August 2011). A "Revolution of Consciousness": Redefining Venezuelan National Identities Through Cinema (PDF) (Thesis). Georgetown University.
- International Bureau of the American Republics (1897). Commercial directory of the American republics, : comprising the manufacturers, merchants, shippers, and banks and bankers engaged in foreign trade; together with the names of officials, maps, commercial statistics, industrial data, and other information concerning the countries of the International union of American republics, the American colonies, and Hawaii. Government Print Office of Washington.
- Hart, Stephen M. (15 October 2014). Latin American Cinema. Reaktion Books. ISBN 9781780234038.
- Izaguirre, Rodolfo (2000). "Un cine en busca de... tantas cosas" [A cinema tradition in search of... so many things]. In Baptista, Asdrúbal (ed.). Venezuela Siglo XX: Visiones y Testimonios [20th Century Venezuela: Visions and Testimonies] (in Spanish). Vol. 1. Fundación Polar. ISBN 978-980-379-015-8.
- Izaguirre, Rodolfo; Cortés Bargalló, Luis (1998). La lengua española y los medios de comunicación vol. 2: En el cine venezolano, la lengua es el asalto [The Spanish language and media of communication vol. 2: In the cinema of Venezuela, language is an attack] (in Spanish). Siglo XXI Editores, Secretary of Public Education. ISBN 9789682321115.
- López, Ana M. (2003). "'Train of Shadows': Early Cinema and Modernity in Latin America". In Shohat, Ella; Stam, Robert (eds.). Multiculturalism, Postcoloniality, and Transnational Media. Rutgers University Press. pp. 99–128. ISBN 9780813532356.
- Martínez de Badra, Elisa (2011). El guión: fin y transición [The script: end and transition]. Universidad Católica Andres Bello. ISBN 9789802441433.
- Milano, Ismar; López, Pedro (2017). "Los Servicios de Alojamiento en Maracaibo-Venezuela: 1830-1920" [The Services of Accommodation in Maracaibo-Venezuela: 1830-1920] (PDF). Trienal de Investigación FAU-UCV (in Spanish).
- Retamal Muñoz, Leonel Alexi (2010). "Ya no basta con grabar: Presencia y permanencia de la cuestión social en el cambio de enfoque del cine documental chileno (1919 – 1959)" [Not enough filming: Presence and permanence of the social question in the change in focus of Chilean documentary filmmaking (1919-1959)]. Tesina Diplomado América Latina, Desarrollo y Cultura: Desafíos de la Globalización – via Universidad de Santiago de Chile.
- Rist, Peter (2014). Historical dictionary of South American cinema. Rowman & Littlefield Publishers. ISBN 9780810880368. OCLC 879947308.
- Schroeder Rodríguez, Paul A. (8 March 2016). Latin American Cinema: A Comparative History. University of California Press. ISBN 9780520963535.
- Semprún Parra, Jesús Ángel; Hernández, Luis Guillermo (2018). Luis Perozo Cervantes (ed.). Diccionario General del Zulia [General Dictionary of Zulia] (in Spanish). Vol. 1. Sultana del Lago. ISBN 9781976873034.
- Soltero Sánchez, Evangelina (1997). "Prosa de vanguardia: tres caminos hacia el séptimo arte" [Prose of vanguard: three paths walked in the seventh art] (pdf). Anales de Literatura Hispanoamericana (in Spanish) (26). ISSN 0210-4547.
- Straka, Tomás (2018). Historical dictionary of Venezuela. Guzmán Mirabal, Guillermo; Cáceres, Alejandro E.; Rudolph, Donna Keyse (Third ed.). Rowman & Littlefield. ISBN 9781538109496. OCLC 993810331.
- Sueiro Villanueva, Yolanda (2007). Inicios de la exhibición cinematográfica en Caracas (1896–1905) [Beginnings of the cinema exhibition in Caracas (1896–1905)] (in Spanish) (1 ed.). Fondo Editorial de Humanidades y Educación, Universidad Central de Venezuela. ISBN 978-9800023952. OCLC 225867560.

News

- "'Muchachos bañándose en la laguna de Maracaibo' en el siglo XXI" ['Muchachos bañándose en la laguna de Maracaibo' en the 21st century]. El Nacional (in Spanish). 22 December 2016. Archived from the original on 20 March 2019.
- Longo, Carmela (26 January 2019). "El cine venezolano busca mantenerse activo" [Venezuelan cinema searches to stay active]. Últimas Noticias (in Spanish). Archived from the original on 25 April 2019.
- "Homenaje a Manuel Trujillo Durán" [Homage to Manuel Trujillo Durán]. Notitarde (in Spanish). 20 November 2016. Archived from the original on 24 April 2019.
- Sanchez Amaya, Humberto (13 January 2019). "Un género con mucho público y un pasado lejano" [A genre with lots of publicity and a distant past]. El Nacional. Archived from the original on 13 January 2019 – via pressreader.com. Alt URL

Video

- Güerere, Abdel (25 January 2017). "Muchachos bañándose en la laguna de Maracaibo Siglo XXI" [Muchachos bañándose en la laguna de Maracaibo 21st Century]. YouTube (in Spanish).
- Historia Viva: La Casa de la Bahía [Living History: La Casa de la Bahía] (in Spanish). Historia Viva. 13 August 2013. Event occurs at 25:35-27:27.

Web

- "El cine nacional está de fiesta" [National cinema is having a party] (in Spanish). Centro Nacional Autónomo de Cinematografía. 26 January 2012. Archived from the original on 6 March 2019.
- Serrano, Arturo (10 November 2014). "Los heroes del cine venezolano (Parte I)" [The heroes of Venezuelan Cinema (Part I)]. Vice Versa (in Spanish).
