= Guillermo Trujillo Durán =

Venezuelan poet and politician

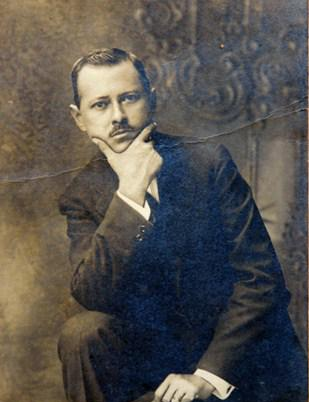
- Born: 10 February 1878; Maracaibo, Venezuela
- Died: 11 February 1967 (aged 89); Maracaibo
- Honours

Guillermo Trujillo Durán (10 February 1878 – 11 February 1967) was a Venezuelan poet and politician. He is also remembered for his work in journalism and film, alongside his brother Manuel Trujillo Durán. He worked as editor for several Maracaibo-based publications and published some collections of poetry. In politics, he first served in the government of Zulia before entering the National Assembly, where he was Vice-President on two occasions.

In 1930, he was awarded one of the highest honors for civilian services to Venezuela, being made a Grand Officer of the Order of the Liberator.

== Early and personal life ==
Guillermo Trujillo Durán was born in Maracaibo, Zulia, on 10 February 1878, to José Trinidad Trujillo and María del Carmen Durán. He had a brother, Manuel, with whom he was always very close. Manuel was a contemporary of Udón Pérez, who would become a famous poet, at school. In adulthood, the brothers and Pérez were friends, with Pérez and Guillermo often seen together at one of Maracaibo's popular artists' meeting places, a refreshment shop in Baralt Plaza. As poets, Pérez and Trujillo were considered of the same class.

He also studied pharmacy at the University of Zulia, but did not graduate.

== Career ==
Trujillo was the director of the magazines El rayo de luz and Gutenberg, both founded by his brother. The studio that these operated out of was at 6 Venezuela Street in downtown Maracaibo, opposite the Baralt Theatre and next to Pérez.

Trujillo became a member of the Venezuelan Academy of Language on 30 August 1952, where he sat in chair Y; was on the editorial board of five other magazine and newspapers; and was also the Vice President of the Literary Center of Zulia. Some of his best work was notable for winning literature competitions.

He then took a job as director of the magazine for the Ministry of Development, and moved to Caracas for this role for several years. In 1957 a compilation of many of his works was published in a book called Prism.

Jesús Angél Semprún Parra describes Trujillo's work as:

His poetry is a mixture of classical, romantic and modernist rhythms where he sings heroic deeds, but is considered superficial, full of common places, with fragile images, despite internal musicality, and that is why few of his poems have remained valid

— J. A. Semprún Parra, Diccionario General de la Literatura en Zulia

=== Cinema ===
Trujillo's brother Manuel learned to operate film projectors through an associate, Luis Manuel Méndez. From this role, many sources credited Manuel and sometimes both Manuel and Guillermo as the creators of the first Venezuelan films. The films are titled Un célebre especialista sacando muelas en el gran Hotel Europa and Muchachos bañándose en el lago de Maracaibo; the narrative nature and early production of the films is a matter of pride across Venezuela and particularly in the state of Zulia; (Note: As noted in several sources, including:) the day of the films' premiere, 28 January, is both National Day of Cinema and the "Day of Zulian Identity" in the state.

=== Politics ===
At one point, Trujillo was the general secretary in the government of Zulia, and then became the deputy for Zulia in Venezuela's National Assembly, serving between 1914 and 1939. He was a deputy over five periods, and for two of these was the Vice President of the National Assembly. He also held various positions overseeing and inspecting trade and highways in Venezuela.

== Publications ==
- El arte por dentro, Monólogo en verso escrito para la artista Srta. Refugio Azuaga y representanto con notable éxito el 11 de marzo de 1899. (1899)
- Discursos leídos en la Academia Venezolana Correspondiente de la Real Española en la recepción del señor don Guillermo Trujillo Durán el día 30 de agosto de 1952. Tema del discurso de Trujillo Durán: "Ojeada sobre la formación del castellano. La obra de las Academias". Contestación del académico Dr. don José Ramón Ayala. Caracas: Academia Venezolana Correspondiente de la Real Española. (1952)
- Discursos leídos en la Academia Venezolana Corresponsidente de la Real Española en la recepción del señor don Luis Yépez el días 30 de abril de 1955. Contestación del académico Don Guillermo Trujillo Durán. Caraca:Academia Venezolana de la Lengua Correspondiente de la Real España. (1955)
- Prisma (1957)
