= Monroe Doctrine (disambiguation) =

Monroe Doctrine is a U.S. foreign policy regarding the Western Hemisphere first articulated in 1823.

It may also refer to:

- Fort Monroe Doctrine, a policy regarding freed slaves working with the Union
- The Monroe Doctrine, a 1896 film
- The Monroe Doctrine, a music album

== See also ==
- Donroe Doctrine, interpretation of U.S. President Donald Trump's foreign policy
