= Isla Multiespacio =

Coordinates: 10.4667°N 66.9500°W

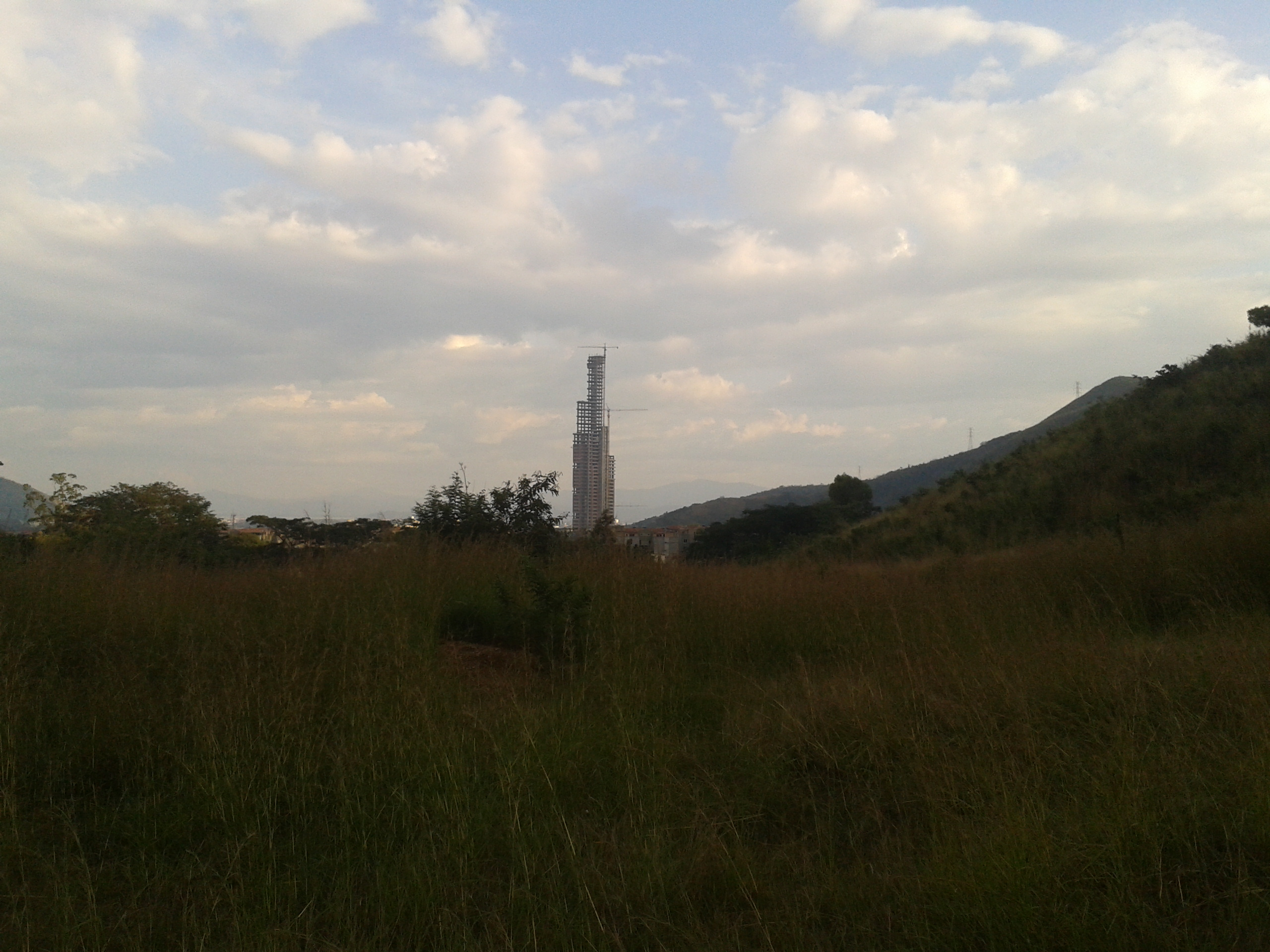
- Interactive map of the Isla Multiespacio area

General information
- Status: Under construction
- Type: Mixed-use
- Location: Valencia, Venezuela
- Construction started: July 2009
- Estimated completion: 2025

Height
- Antenna spire: 252.8 m (829 ft)
- Roof: 200 m (660 ft) (Corporate Tower); 150 m (490 ft) (Hotel)

Technical details
- Floor count: 65 (Corporate Tower); 35 (Hotel)

Design and construction
- Architect: Pedro Mateo
- Main contractor: CACRO C.A.

The Isla Multiespacio Complex (abbreviated IME) is among the most ambitious architectural projects of recent years in Venezuela. This is currently under construction in the Municipality of San Diego in Valencia, Carabobo State (Venezuela). Its construction started in July 2009 and is expected to be completed in 2025. From the Isla Multiespacio stands the highest office tower in the Midwest, the skyscraper would be 150 m initially but then they decided to increase the height to 252.8 m and 65 floors. it's the tallest building in Venezuela, built the first private theater in the nation and a hotel designed for guests with joy social areas looking at the city from above, among other projects.

== Corporate tower ==
The elevators were designed to ensure fast and efficient service running 5.6 meters per second and faster labor dynamics.

== Hotel ==
The hotel plans to have 300 rooms: 290 double rooms, each with more than 36 m2, 9 suites of 68 m2 and 174 m2 presidential suite.

== Private theater ==
The complex plans to have the first private theater in Venezuela. Plans show that this cinema will be suspended in the air as a part of its design. A grandstand, which serves as the main entrance and space for outdoor functions, rises to nearly 5 feet above the ground, a second characteristic that makes it unique in the country.

== Mall ==
The commercial center of 22,206 m2 is divided into 4 modules buildings with enclosed areas and outdoor simulate urban shopping streets typical of a few decades ago, with neon signs, personality facades, terraces, and artisans. In total it will have an area of more than 180 shops including food court, restaurants and movie theaters.

== Integrative medical clinic and aesthetician ==
It has 12 floors with offices focused on the inner and outer beauty in an area of 3,600 m2 with the advantage of being located 5 minutes from the industrial park, the airport, the flying club and 10 minutes of the 3 major universities in the region, which allows a break of aesthetics at any time of day; way to work or school, at noon or late afternoon.

== Parking ==
The Isla Multiespacio will have a parking structure, which is designed with ease of access, in their four levels for a total of 1760 sites roofing, which would join the 440 seats in the basement of the theater, to provide a total of 2100 parking spaces.

== See also ==
- List of hotels in Venezuela
- List of tallest buildings in South America
