= Hotel Europa =

Former hotel in Venezuela

Coordinates: 10°38′27.7″N 71°36′26.4″W

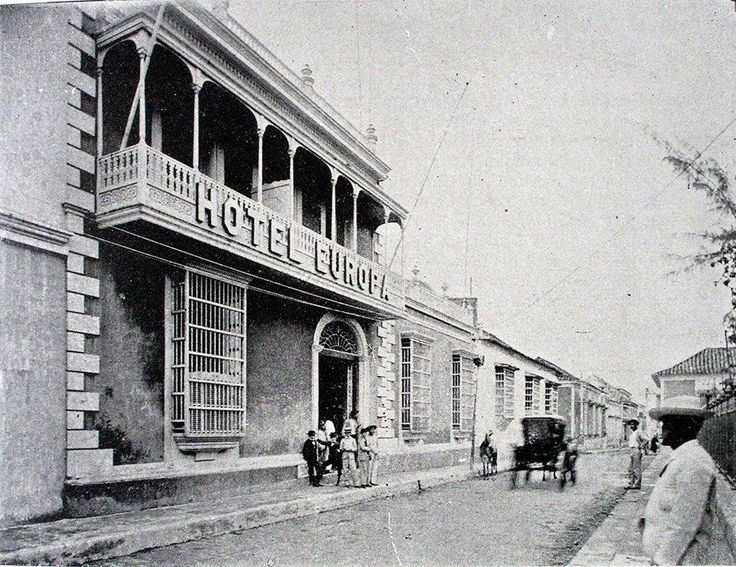
The Hotel Europa in Maracaibo, c. 1897

The Hotel Europa was a grand hotel located in Maracaibo, Venezuela. It opened in the late 19th century and served as the filming location for the first Venezuelan film, Un célebre especialista sacando muelas en el gran Hotel Europa, in 1897. Later, it was converted into other hotels with different names, most notably the Hotel Zulia, before being demolished in 1956 for the construction of the Maracaibo municipal building.

== History ==
The Hotel Europa opened at the end of the 19th century. It was situated at the south corner of Plaza Bolívar in the center of Maracaibo, facing the square. The building it occupied had been standing for a long time; it was considered at the time "the most beautiful" in the city. It had previously been the home of the Italian consul, Don Francisco Fossi.

=== Hotel Europa ===
The hotel was reportedly popular because of its efficient service, comfort, and the respectable management.

The hotel was also considered prestigious, as it had many modern amenities and guest rooms were spacious with "all-American comfort" pieces including full bathtubs and marble-tiled showers. There were also suites for family visitors. The restaurant was ventilated and offered live music; the menu reportedly offered an extensive selection of European dishes and had a well-stocked service of "the most exquisite liquors" available. The hotel was advertised to offer good service for a reasonable price; this countered the main concerns of visitors to the area, which were reported as typically expensive yet dirty.

The location of the hotel was also prime, situated near the center of the city, as guests could listen to the military displays taking place in Plaza Concordia from their balconies on Thursdays and Sundays; this was seen as an exclusive attraction of the city.

In 1897, the hotel was the filming location for the first Venezuelan-produced film, Un célebre especialista sacando muelas en el gran Hotel Europa. Later reports state that an innovation of hotels at the time, particularly the more modern Hotel Europa and its similar Hotel Los Andes, was to have on-hand medical services for foreign guests.

=== Later functions ===
The Hotel Europa became the Hotel Zulia in 1913, which was accessed from Calle de las Ciencias. This hotel was financed by Doña Concha Iriarte, and had two storeys, with the guest rooms on the top floor. It was advertised as for "families, tourists, traveling agents, [and] oil tycoons". Typical rates at Maracaibo hotels in 1931 were $6 to $8 per day.

The hotel was known as a meeting point for high society of the time, where guests and visitors could hear the music of Juan Delgado, Eduardo Perich, María de Ángela, Carmelita Suárez, and their students. It saw some refurbishment in 1928, opening the Zulia Tea Room on the ground level; this was a patisserie designed by Hermes Romero, a Zulian architect. However, by the 1930s, Doña Concha had left the business and it had become the Hotel América. This hotel served largely traveling businessmen and baseball players from elsewhere, as it was close to both the city center and the Estadio del Lago in La Ciega. The building then passed to ownership by the municipal council and was retained as an administrative headquarters before being demolished in 1956 to construct a new Maracaibo municipal council building that would replace the entire block.

== See also ==
- List of hotels in Venezuela
