= Rafael Parra =

Rafael Parra was the president of the Venezuelan state of Zulia and a Venezuelan general. He died in October 1912, in Curaçao.

== President of Zulia ==
Parra was appointed the President of Zulia in 1877, by the new President of Venezuela, Francisco Linares Alcántara. He arrived in Maracaibo on 22 September 1877. He held the office for three terms, between 1877 and 1878 and again in 1891. One of his first acts (before he arrived in Maracaibo) was to create a Board for reconstructing the Baralt Theatre. Parra signed off on the demolition and rebuild of the old Baralt Theatre on 28 July 1877; he laid the first stone of the new building in a ceremony on 7 October 1877. The new theatre was inaugurated on 24 July 1883; the inauguration was combined with traditional festivities for the birthday of Simón Bolívar.

In 1877, Parra voiced his support of the Maracaibo aqueduct. Not yet under construction, the aqueduct had been approved for consideration on 23 February 1877. This year, the state had brought an American or English engineer called Turner to Maracaibo to consult on aqueducts for the large Lake Maracaibo; state legislature authorized for Parra to employ Turner, but Turner died shortly thereafter and work did not begin.

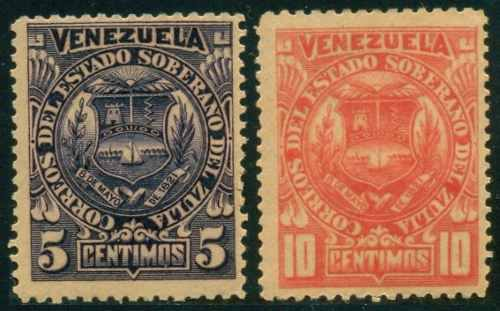
Stamp from Zulia commissioned by Parra

He unsuccessfully sought re-election in 1880, for which there were three candidates. The election campaigning was seen as violent. In 1891, he returned to the presidency, taking office on 25 January and touring the various districts of Zulia in July that year. During 1891, Parra also introduced a new postal system to Zulia and was involved in establishing the design of a stamp for Zulia; he decreed that the state would have its own stamp and system, but this had not been authorized by the Venezuelan government. Parra produced 50,000 stamps, which featured the new shield of state. These never left the Maracaibo customs office until 1896, when the new President of Zulia, Jesús Muñoz Tébar, paid the fiscal value of the stamps and had many sent to the Venezuelan army to be destroyed (they were technically illegal), also sending some to the personal collection of David Belloso Rossell.

== Personal life ==
Parra was married to Gregoria Martínez, and their son Hermócrates Parra was born on 19 February 1867 in La Villa del Rosario. Hermócrates was a surveyor and civil engineer in Zulia; he was one of the state's first engineers and constructed much of the city's infrastructure. After working in North America, Hermócrates later became a politician in Zulia.
