= List of hotels in Venezuela =

The following is a list of some hotels in Venezuela:

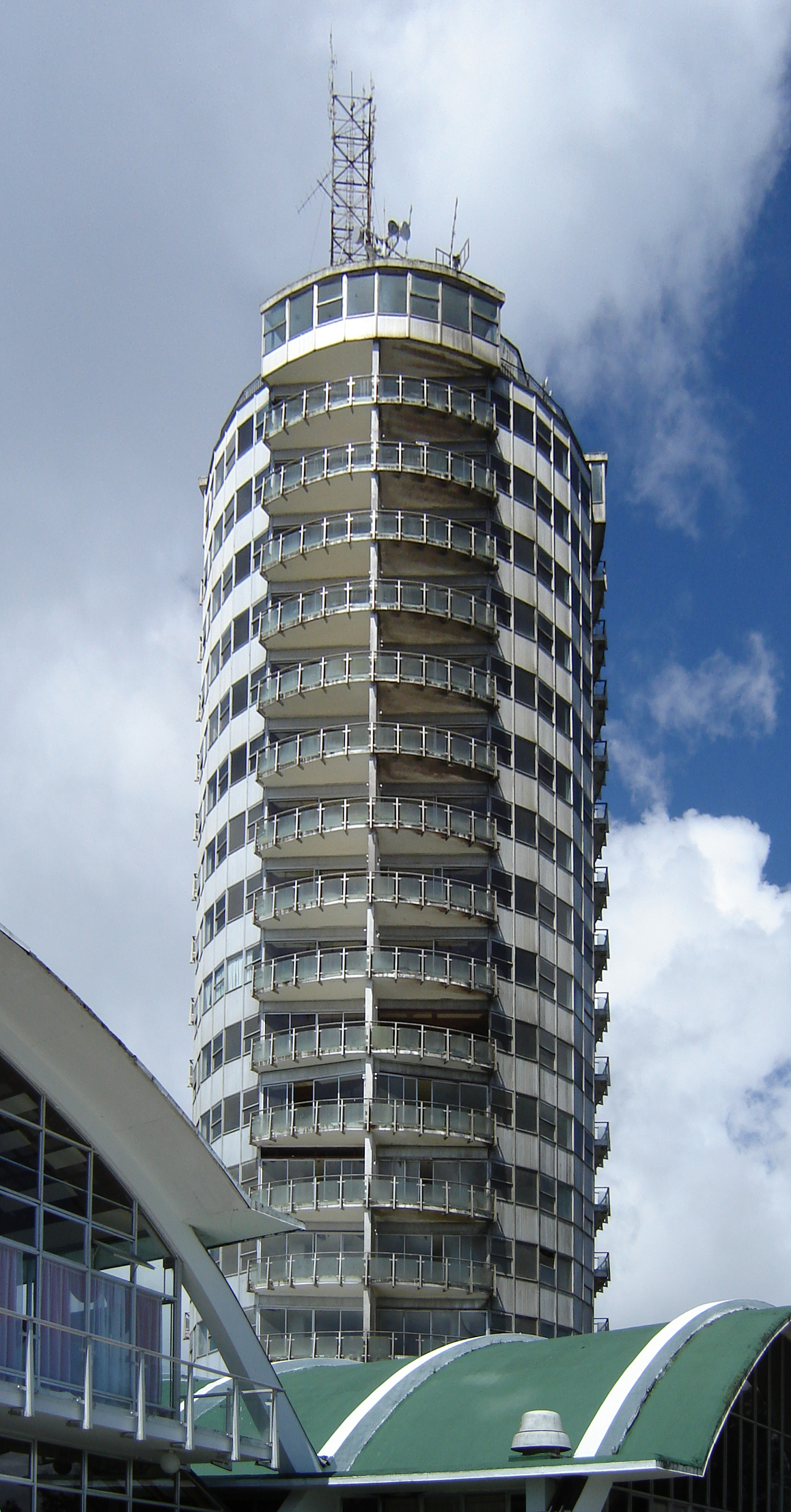
Humboldt Hotel, located in Caracas

== Amazonas ==
- Gran Hotel Amazonas

== Aragua ==
- Antiguo Hotel Jardín
- Hotel de Golf Maracay

== Carabobo ==
- Hotel Hesperia Valencia

== Caracas ==
- Gran Meliá Caracas
- Hotel Alba Caracas
- Hotel Aladdin
- Hotel Ávila
- Hotel Caracas Palace
- Hotel Humboldt
- Hotel Tamanaco Intercontinental

== Nueva Esparta ==
- Hotel La Posada de El Reino

== Zulia ==
- Hotel Kristoff Maracaibo

== Defunct ==
| Hotel | Location | Opened | Closed |
|---|---|---|---|
| Hotel Europa | Maracaibo, Zulia state | Late 19th century | 1956 |
| Hotel Majestic | Caracas | 1930 | 1949 |
| Hotel Potomac | Caracas | 1949 | 1990 |

== See also ==
- Isla Multiespacio
- List of hotels in Mexico
- List of hotels in Puerto Rico
- Lists of hotels – an index of hotel list articles on Wikipedia
