= Rafael María Baralt =

Venezuelan diplomat

The Most Excellent Rafael María Baralt
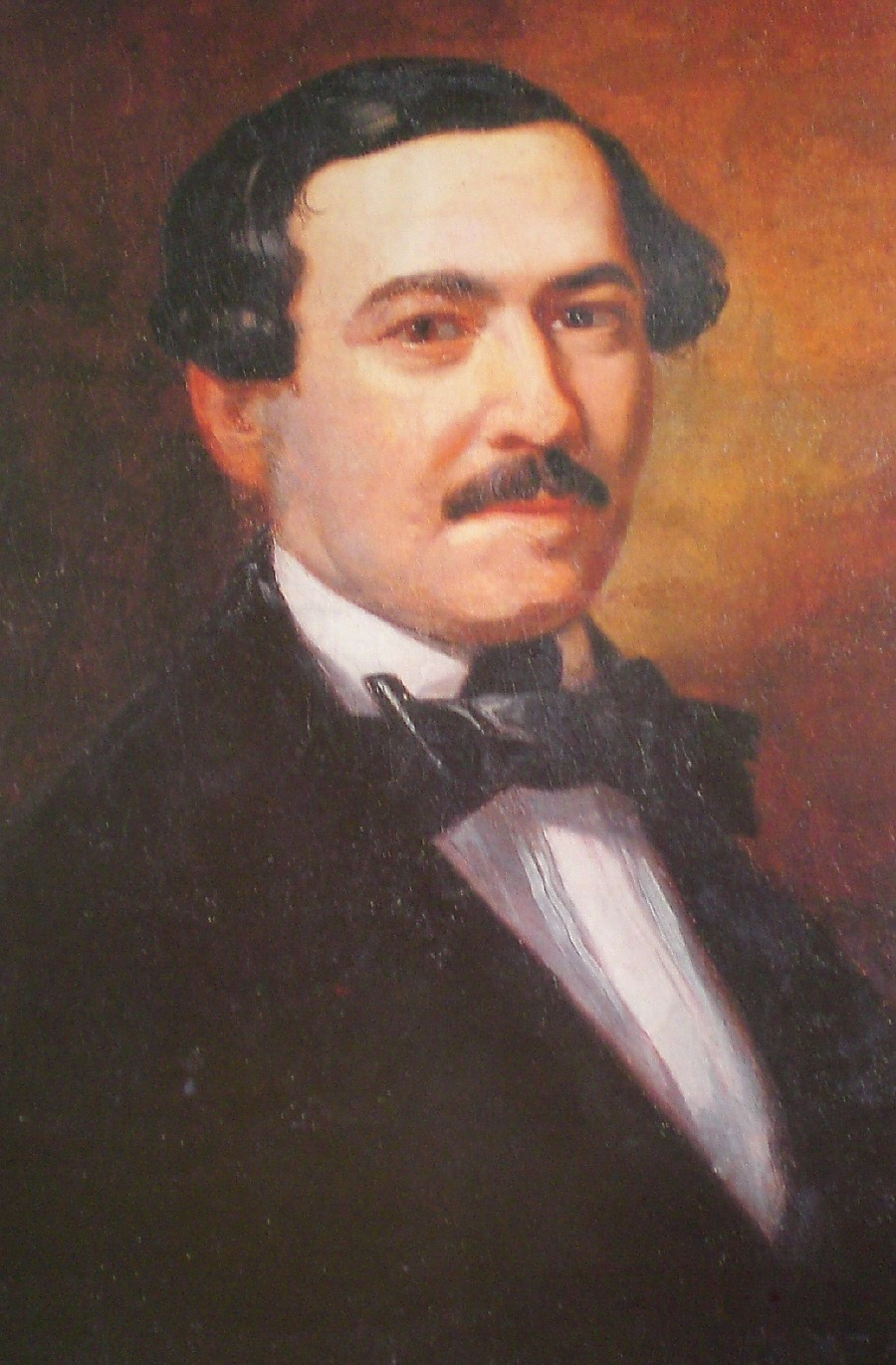
- Born: Rafael María Baralt y Pérez; 3 July 1810; Maracaibo, Viceroyalty of New Granada
- Died: 4 January 1860 (aged 49); Madrid, Spain

Seat R of the Real Academia Española
- In office 27 November 1853 – 4 January 1860
- Preceded by: Juan Donoso Cortés
- Succeeded by: Tomás Rodríguez Rubí

Rafael María Baralt y Pérez (3 July 1810 - 4 January 1860) was a Venezuelan diplomat and one of the country's most famed writers, philologists, and historians. He was the first Latin American to occupy a chair at the Real Academia Española.

== Life ==
Born in Maracaibo on 3 July 1810, he was the son of Miguel Antonio Baralt, who helped build the Baralt Theater in Maracaibo, and Ana Francisca Pérez, who was Dominican.

Baralt was elected to seat R of the Real Academia Española, he took up his seat on 27 November 1853.

He suffered an untimely death in Madrid on 4 January 1860 due to the stresses and aggravations suffered during services rendered to his beloved country of birth. He is buried in the National Pantheon of Venezuela.

== Gallery ==
Statue of Rafael María Baralt in Plaza Baralt

Photo of Baralt from 1859

Close up of the statue

== Books ==
- Resumen de la Historia de Venezuela (1840)
- Adiós a la Patria (1842).
