= Muchachos bañándose en la laguna de Maracaibo =

Venezuelan film from 1897

Muchachos bañandose en la laguna de Maracaibo
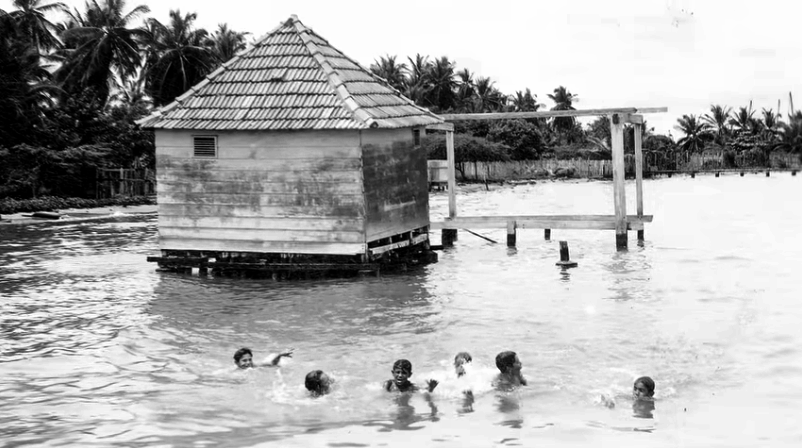
- An archive photograph from the 1890s of boys bathing in the lake, used to recreate the film in the 2010s
- Directed by: Unknown; possibly Manuel Trujillo Durán or Gabriel Veyre
- Release date: 28 January 1897
- Country: Venezuela

Muchachos bañándose en la laguna de Maracaibo (English: Kids bathing at the lagoon of Maracaibo) is the second Venezuelan film produced, after Un célebre especialista sacando muelas en el gran Hotel Europa. It was screened at the Baralt Theatre in Maracaibo, Venezuela, on 28 January 1897.

The film shows a group of young people, "muchachos", enjoying Lake Maracaibo. Not much is known about the film's production, and scholars question the identity of its director. Though more is known of the contents of this film than its pair Un célebre especialista..., it has not seen as much modern discussion as the latter.

== Content ==
The film shows a group of young people "bathing" at the titular lake or lagoon, and includes "views of Baralt Plaza, the main market, and, in general, the central belt of the city".^{:42} Jesús Ricardo Azuaga García writes that the film was stylistically similar to Lumière films, possibly emulating them, in that it was "like a postcard".^{:29} He later notes that a French sensibility is highly irregular for Venezuelan film, listing only three instances.^{:37} No copies of the film were preserved, but there have been at least two partial restorations. The first is a reconstructed shot of children jumping into the lake, included on disc 4 of a National Library DVD collection documenting the history of Venezuelan cinema; other images from the film were also included, on disc 3.^{:66, 91-2} Later, for the 120th anniversary of the premiere in January 2017, the Venezuelan Association of Film Exhibitors produced some reconstructed film of both Un celebre especialista... and Muchachos bañándose.... The group collected frames from the 1890s stored in the Zulia Photographic Archive, restoring and colorizing the images to recreate the approximate look of the films. Emiliano Faría directed the effort, with Abdel Güerere writing and producing.

== Screening ==
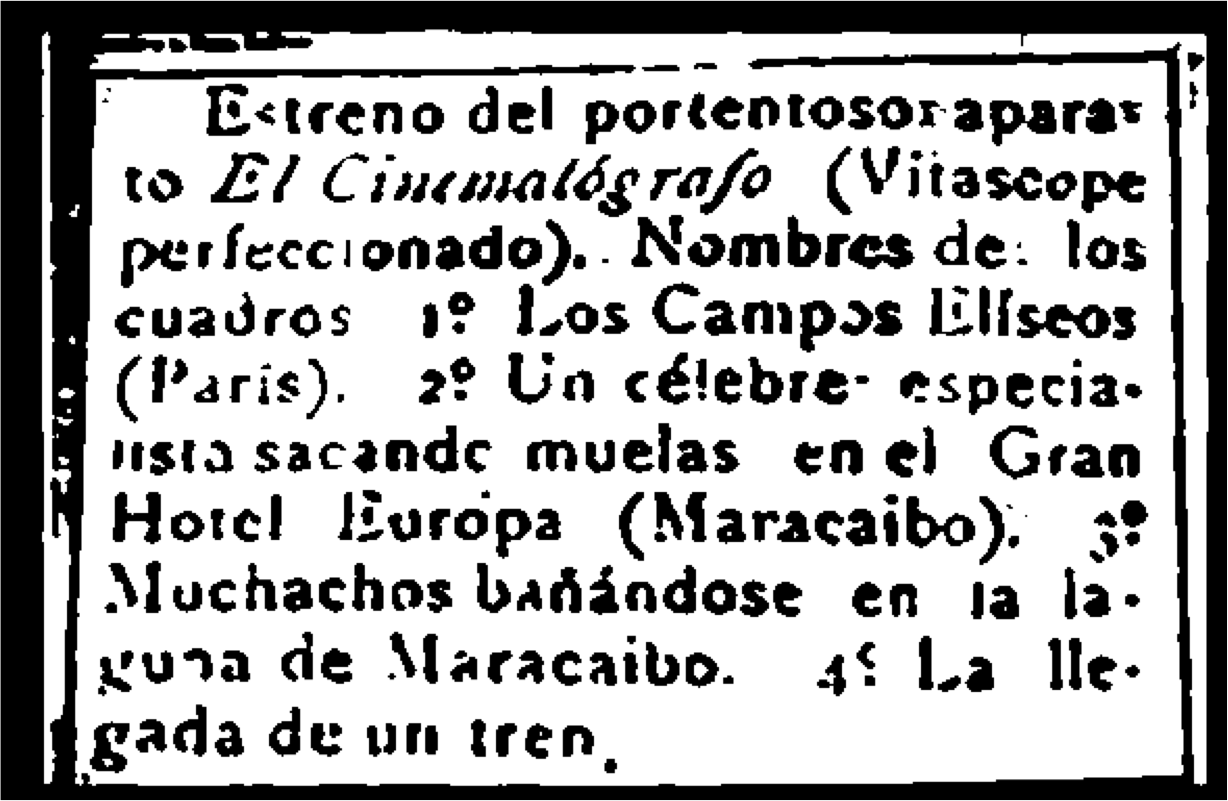
Newspaper clipping announcing the showing of films. (Note: The clipping reads: Estreno del portentoso aparato El Cinematógrafo (Vitascope perfeccionado). Nombres de los cuadros 1° Los Campos Elíseos (Paris). 2° Un célebre especialista sacando muelas en el Gran Hotel Europa (Maracaibo). 3° Muchachos bañandose en la laguna de Maracaibo. 4° La llegada de un tren. In English: Premiere of the portentous device The Cinematographer (perfected Vitascope). Names of the shows 1st The Champs Elysees (Paris). 2nd A celebrated specialist pulling teeth in the Great Hotel Europa (Maracaibo). 3rd Kids bathing at Lake Maracaibo. 4th The arrival of a train.)

Less than six months after Venezuela saw the arrival of the first Vitascope, Venezuelan film as a national industry began on 28 January 1897 at exactly 7:00 pm,^{:9} with the screening of two films produced in the country—Un célebre especialista sacando muelas en el gran Hotel Europa and Muchachos bañándose en la laguna de Maracaibo. This screening was held at the Teatro Baralt in Maracaibo, where the first films to be shown in the country, imported American shorts, had been shown previously.^{:xxxi} Two other films, both French, were shown in the same screening. The first was a short film showing a race down the Champs-Élysées. The other, shown last of the four, was L'Arrivée d'un train en gare de La Ciotat; both French films were by the Lumière brothers and, according to Peter Rist, were projected in Maracaibo by Gabriel Veyre.^{:2} Un célebre especialista sacando muelas en el gran Hotel Europa showed a dentist perform an extraction at a famous hotel. Venezuelan film historian and critic Rodolfo Izaguirre has suggested that in addition to the Venezuelan and French films, some American films by Thomas Edison were shown as well.^{:752} The films were screened following a performance of Gaetano Donizetti's opera La favorita.^{:107–120}^{:29}

The screening may not have gone very well. Reports suggest the public reception was both cautiously intrigued at moving images, but indifferent to the films themselves.^{:13} A contemporary review, in El Cronista, noted the films seemed well-shot, but the actual screening was not well executed. The reviewer noted the running of the tapes was initially irregular, and the lighting of the theatre was too bright to show films, making it hard to see images. However, he also reports that the film "of the kids bathing in the lake" was met with loud applause.^{:28} (Note: Review text: "el descorrer de la cinta adolecía de alguna irregularidad y que la luz que daba sobre el bastidor no pareció bien dispuesta: así se borraban o confundían lastimosamente las figuras (aunque) los cuadros del Cinematógrafo parecieron buenos, muy particularmente el de los muchachos bañándose en el lago, que fue ruidosamente aplaudido" In English: "the drawing of the tape suffered from some irregularity and the light that it gave on the frame did not seem well disposed: this way the figures were erased or confused pitifully (though) the pictures of the cinematographer seemed good, very particularly that of the kids bathing in the lake, which was loudly applauded")

== Production and identity of director ==
The film is widely stated to have been made by Manuel Trujillo Durán, a view that persisted even after it was determined the film pioneer did not bring the Vitascope to Venezuela.^{:47}

For many years, sources suggested that it was Trujillo, with or without his brother Guillermo, who made the early films.^{:242}^{:22}^{:14} Debate still continues, with Venezuelan film scholars variously suggesting different likelihoods that Trujillo was the director. To support the opinion he was not the director, there is evidence that Trujillo probably did not have a motion picture camera with which to make the film, and was in Táchira at the time.^{:54} Those who feel Trujillo could be the director rely on his proximity to film at its inception in Venezuela and his relationship with American camera companies.^{:337} Even Rodolfo Izaguirre, veteran Venezuelan film critic and inveterate supporter of Trujillo, says the films are only "presumed" to be made by him,^{:752} with Venezuelan film histories that support Trujillo noting that "it is said" he was the pioneer.^{:337}

Alexis Fernández, film scholar and lecturer, and a biographer of Trujillo, discussed the production of the first films in a television interview in 2013, agreeing that there is nothing tangible to prove who the director was. While it is generally accepted that Trujillo did not make the film,^{:2060} in both local and national Venezuelan news and culture, however, the belief that Trujillo effectively and single-handedly started Venezuelan cinema persists. An article in the pro-Maduro newspaper Últimas Noticias about National Film Day events in January 2019 celebrated Trujillo for not only making and projecting the film himself, but also being personally responsible for outfitting the Baralt Theatre so the films could be shown.

In 2018, historians Jesús Ángel Semprún Parra and Luis Guillermo Hernández suggested that Veyre, the French camera operator and filmmaker, was more likely to be the director. While Trujillo left Maracaibo at the start of January 1897 to travel to Colombia to present films there, Veyre and C.F. Bernard arrived in Venezuela at the same time as part of their filmmaking tour of Latin America and the Caribbean.^{:528}

== Modern critical views ==
Azuaga García writes that the film falls into one of the two main categories of film at its time; he explains that in Venezuelan early cinema there were typically either government-focused or tourism films, Muchachos bañandose... is the latter, and may have inspired Julio Soto's films of the 1910s, Tomas del Lago and Revista de Maracaibo.^{:35}

Discussing the success of these first films of the nation, Michelle Leigh Farrell questions the Venezuelan film industry's influence; though leading in the 1890s by virtue of having some of the earliest films in Latin America, its output was lacking compared to other South American countries through the 20th century. She proposes that being a frontrunner in filmmaking was cause for the government to take over the industry for the purpose of self-promotion, stymying general cinema production.^{:21} Michael Chanan instead notes that after the first films, it was typical of the Latin American markets to slow down production, though he also suggests there may be many lost and forgotten films from the early to mid century.^{:427-435}

Elisa Martínez de Badra compares the film and its pair to their few predecessors, writing that the Edison films shown in Maracaibo in 1896 were "theatrical spectacle" but that Muchachos bañándose... was not; Martínez describes it as a "new media". She also says that Muchachos bañándose... together with Un célebre especialista... are one of two factors leading to the development of a narrative approach in Venezuelan cinema—the other was the working partnership of Carlos Ruiz Chapellín and W.O. Wolcopt creating slapstick comedy.^{:67}
