= Hotel Aladdin =

General information
- Status: Completed
- Type: Hotel
- Location: Caracas, Venezuela
- Inaugurated: 1998-1999

Hotel Aladdin is a hotel located in Caracas, Venezuela. It was built in the Guaicaipuro street of El Rosal, in the Chacao municipality of Caracas, and inaugurated between 1998 and 1999. Part of the filming of the 2005 film Secuestro Express took place in the hotel. In 2023 it was unofficially reported that the hotel was in sale.

== See also ==
- Humboldt Hotel
- List of hotels in Venezuela
