= Universidad Rafael Belloso Chacín =

Dr. Rafael Belloso Chacín University (URBE)
- Motto: Somos Excelencia (Spanish)
- Motto in English: We are Excellency
- Established: 5 October 1989; 36 years ago
- Affiliations: Universia; EF (Education First); AIESAD; GDLN; ATEI
- President: Óscar Belloso Vargas
- Vice-Chancellor: Mike González
- Students: approx. 40,000
- Location: Maracaibo, Zulia, Venezuela; 10.6933°N 71.6337°W
- Campus: 71.126 sq yd (59.470 m^{2})
- Colours: Intense Red, Blue & White
- Nickname: URBE
- Website: www.urbe.edu

The Dr. Rafael Belloso Chacín University (Spanish: Universidad Rafael Belloso Chacín, URBE) is a private university in Maracaibo, Zulia State, and one of the largest in Venezuela. The university was founded by its founding principal and superior council president, Óscar Belloso Medina in 1989.

It has approximately 40.000 students in undergraduate, graduate and other courses offered by this university and these are divided into 5 faculties from which they derive 9 schools that are taught in 17 careers and 25 graduate programs. It also has a line of media which are: TV URBE, a television station dedicated to the university; URBE 96.3fm, radio station 96.3 FM frequency for the state of Zulia, and an official web portal.

== History ==
=== Foundation ===
The university was founded on 5 October 1989 in honor of Dr. Rafael Belloso Chacin, MD founder and rector of the university. It started academic activities on 26 March 1990 with 567 students and 100 teachers.

=== Faculties ===
On 5 October 1995, six years after the foundation of the city, he joined the Faculty of Law and Political Sciences with the School of Law and the Faculty of Administrative Sciences adds two new degrees: Accounting and Industrial Relations.

By November 1996, the Graduate Student Day, marks the final entry to the super information highway with the operation of the Internet.

== Faculties ==
Rafael Belloso Chacin University has 5 faculties, 9 schools and a total of 17 races:

Faculty of Engineering

- School of Informatic Engineering
- School of Computer Engineering
- School of Industrial Engineering
- School of Electronic Engineering (Telecommunications, Automation and Control)

Faculty of Humanities and Education

- School of Education (Integral and Preschool)
- School of Mass Communication (Journalism, Audiovisual Communication, Advertising and Public Relations)

Faculty of Administrative Sciences

- Accounting
- School of Administration (Business, Marketing, Banking and Insurance)
- Human Resources Management

Faculty of Computer Science

- Graphic Design: This major focuses on giving the students the right tools to perform in the graphic design studies. Students learn how to apply several techniques, hand made or digital, through the use of software and other methods that have shaped what we know today as Graphic Design. This major also explores the artistic side a graphic designer must have to take fully advantage of his/her work. Students learn how to start with sketches and finish with amazing digital works of art.

Faculty of Law

- Law School
