= Manuel Trujillo Durán =

Venezuelan filmmaker

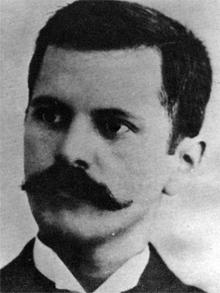
- Born: Manuel María Segundo de la Trinidad Trujillo Durán; 8 January 1871; Maracaibo, Venezuela
- Died: 14 March 1933 (aged 62)
- Known for: Pioneering film in Venezuela
- Notable work: possibly Un célebre especialista sacando muelas en el gran Hotel Europa and Muchachos bañándose en el lago de Maracaibo

Manuel Trujillo Durán (8 January 1871 – 14 March 1933) was a Venezuelan photographer who pioneered film in Venezuela. Trujillo was most successful as a photographer, though he dabbled in other industries and is best remembered for his connections to the fledgling film industry in Venezuela. He became one of the first people from Latin America to learn how to show films; he was thought for many years to be the director of Venezuela's first films, and traveled through Venezuela and Colombia with projectors to introduce cinema to this part of the South American continent.

== Early and personal life ==
Manuel María Segundo de la Trinidad Trujillo Durán was born in Maracaibo, Zulia, a prosperous city in northwest Venezuela, on 8 January 1871, to José Trinidad Trujillo and María del Carmen Durán. He had a brother, Guillermo, with whom he was always very close.

At age 14, Trujillo began studying at the Colegio Federal de Varones, where he excelled in arts and sciences. In school he was a contemporary of Udón Pérez, who would become a famous poet. Both knew each other in adulthood, as the men worked next door to each other.

Trujillo married twice; with his first wife, Atilana Maggiolo, he had one child, who died in infancy, and with his second wife, Agripina Altuve, he had five children – two (Roque and Ciro) survived to adulthood. He had two grandchildren, who were both alive in 2013: Iraida and Martín Trujillo Ortiz.

Trujillo had an interest in astronomy; when the solar eclipse of 3 February 1916 could be seen from Maracaibo, he took a telescope to the roof of the government buildings to view it, releasing fireworks over the city when the eclipse began to spur a celebration among the people.

Though celebrated in his lifetime for various pursuits, Trujillo killed himself by gunshot at his home in Maracaibo on 14 March 1933. His funeral procession took over the city.

== Photography ==
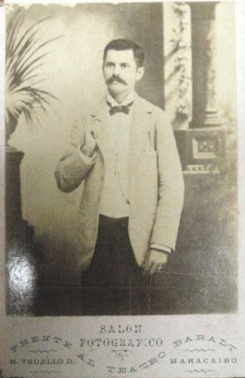
An advertisement for Trujillo's photography services, including a self-portrait

In 1896, Trujillo founded his "El rayo de luz" (English: "The ray of light") photography studio at 6 Venezuela Street, in front of the Baralt Theatre. It was here where, starting in 1897, he would produce and develop images for his magazine of the same name. He likely built the studio himself, as he was eager and attentive to carpentry. He also founded the Gutenberg newspaper. Several of his photographs were used in other publications, including national newspapers. He then founded the Trujillo y Arraga photographic hall, with the painter Julio Arraga, as an exhibition centre for "photographic art and artistic creation [to come] together". In the 1897 Commercial Directory of American Republics, his registered profession was photographer.^{:1366}

== Film pioneering ==
Trujillo was a photographer by trade and an associate of film technician and entrepreneur Luis Manuel Méndez; through this friendship he learned how to use a Vitascope, and be a film technician, when Méndez acquired one and brought it to Venezuela in 1896. For many years (Note: Film scholarship in Venezuela began in about the late 1970s, with documents produced from the early 1980s. Some early Venezuelan "scholarly" documents, like film critic Izaguirre's essay/article from 1984, mention the then-accepted Trujillo narrative when contextualising other topics.) both official records and the general public believed that Trujillo had brought the technology to Venezuela himself. (Note: This claim persists in several records.) When the film industry grew in Venezuela, and the subsequent development of film scholarship with access to local archives, scholars began to study the early films and found records that showed that Méndez was the person who introduced film to Venezuela after acquiring the film projector in New York City. Trujillo's past relationship dealing with the Edison Company was evidence used to support his pioneering claims, Méndez's travel records and ties to the Kinetoscope Company, which produced and sold the projectors, was evidence of him introducing the technology in Venezuela.

When Méndez brought the technology to Maracaibo, it allowed him and Trujillo to show films. Trujillo then took the projectors around Venezuela and Colombia, and became a pioneer in the roles of projector, distributor and marketer. It is also possible that Trujillo produced the first Venezuelan films, shown in Maracaibo in 1897, or that he worked on them with his brother Guillermo. These are titled Un célebre especialista sacando muelas en el gran Hotel Europa and Muchachos bañándose en el lago de Maracaibo. Though the film industry in the country did not take off after these films were shown, (Note: For further discussion on the industry impact, see the films' articles.) the narrative nature and early production of the films is a matter of pride across Venezuela and particularly in the state of Zulia; (Note: As noted in several sources, including:.) the day of the films' premiere, 28 January, is both National Day of Cinema and the "Day of Zulian Identity" in the state.

However, film scholarship considers the possibility of Trujillo being the director also to be "very unlikely" due to the facts he would not have had a cinema camera and that he was in Táchira when the films were screened. His reason for being in Táchira was to distribute and promote the Vitascope, being the first to introduce cinema to other parts of the country.

After 1897, Trujillo returned to photography until 1902; in August 1903 he was working with fellow Zulian Alfredo Duplat in San Cristóbal, Táchira on films, traveling through the state after showing films in Cúcuta.^{:55} A report in the newspaper Horizontes announced that they were showing films that they had directed.^{:55} Trujillo Durán continued to work in film through the decade, but sparsely: he operated projectors at several locations, including as the duo 'Trujillo & March' at the Baralt Theatre, where he is documented in 1906 and 1908; at the University of the Andes in 1907; and around the country for Pathé in 1908 and 1909.^{:55}

== Legacy ==
Though it is generally agreed that Trujillo was only employed to operate the projector during Venezuela's first film screenings in 1896, it is a widespread belief in some parts of the country that he did make the first Venezuelan films in 1897. Film scholar Arturo Serrano wrote an article that discussed this, saying there are "two tendencies" in the nation's history. One promotes Trujillo as "the most important pioneer of Venezuelan cinema", with the other tendency seeing him as an employee and artist adjacent to the true pioneers. Serrano also mentions that even the first tendency does not say with certainty that Trujillo made the first films, but believe that it's "very likely".

This did not stop Trujillo from becoming an icon in Venezuela, with the population generally seeing him as their national father of film, and the National Short Film Festival founded in 1990 named after him. He has been reverently described as "a transhuman entrepreneur of spectacle in Maracaibo and elsewhere [in Venezuela]", and a "journalist, painter and apprentice of everything human", with biographers claiming that "his presence gave wings to Maracaibo, allowed thought and illusions, criticism and theory to circulate".
