= Luis Manuel Méndez =

Luis Manuel Méndez was a Venezuelan businessman and film presenter from the state of Zulia.

== Electric business ==
Méndez worked as a representative for the American Telephone Company across the west of Venezuela, operating in Maracaibo, San Antonio del Táchira, Cúcuta (in present-day Colombia) and San Cristóbal. Venezuelan film scholar Arturo Serrano, therefore believes that his interest in starting a film business was not new or unexpected when he traveled to New York in 1896. In this capacity, he operated the Maracaibo Telephone Company, opening telephone lines in the city on 5 November 1888 with an initial 50 connected devices.^{:2021}

== Bringing cinema to Venezuela ==
=== Vitascope deal ===
In 1896, Méndez was tasked with bringing electricity to the state of Táchira, and took a trip to New York City for information. It was while he was in New York that early demonstrations from competing cinema companies took place; Méndez was inspired to get into the business, which he saw to be profitable, and made a deal for distribution rights with the Vitascope across both Venezuela and neighboring Colombia.^{:42-43} Méndez paid $750 on 10 June, becoming the first foreign deal for the Vitascope; he received Vitascope number 25, and returned to Venezuela later that month.^{:43}

For many years (Note: Film scholarship in Venezuela began in about the late 1970s, with documents produced from the early 1980s. Some early Venezuelan "scholarly" documents, like film critic Izaguirre's essay/article from 1984, mention the then-accepted Trujillo narrative when contextualising other topics.) records instead indicated that the Vitascope was introduced by contemporary Manuel Trujillo Durán, whom Méndez employed at the time. Though Trujillo, a photographer, had connections to the Edison Company, Méndez had his own with the Kinetoscope Company, which produced and traded the Vitascope. It was later when the travel records of Méndez' visit to the United States were discovered was his role widely acknowledged.

=== Screenings and distribution ===
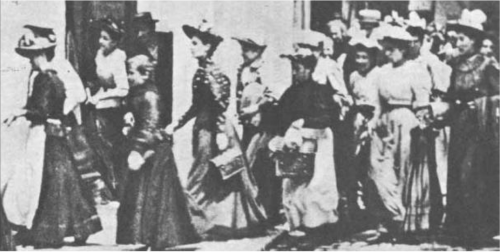
Crowds gather outside the Teatro Baralt to see films projecting on Vitascope for the first time in Venezuela, 11 July 1896.

When Méndez brought the technology to Venezuela, it allowed him to show films in the country for the first time; he hired Trujillo to set up a show in Maracaibo, playing four shows over a few days.^{:42-43} What was thought to be the first film screening in Venezuela was held on 11 July 1896,^{:43} a fact discovered in documentation found at Harvard in 1991. This show was held in the Baralt Theatre, where the first Venezuelan-produced films would be shown the next year, with tickets costing 1 bolívar in the stalls and 20 bolívares in the balcony.^{:42-43} However, the Kinetoscope Company had already presented the Kinetoscope in the country in 1895,^{:42} and shown at least one film, with another report suggesting a film was shown in Venezuela as early as 24 September 1894.^{:44}

However, these did not show the breadth of films Méndez licensed from 1896, nor show them as widely.^{:44} After the screenings in Maracaibo, Trujillo was put under contract by Méndez to take the projector around Venezuela and Colombia, distributing and marketing films. He originally returned to Maracaibo in November 1896 after touring Venezuela and with a collection of new films that he wished to show, but was sent to Colombia instead.^{:45}

The first film produced specifically for the Vitascope was known as The Monroe Doctrine or the alternate title Venezuela Case in the United States, (Note: See Monroe Doctrine at IMDb.) where it was made, and as Alegoría sobre la doctrina de Monroe in Venezuela.^{:44} The film was a satirical take on the auspices of the Monroe Doctrine, and presented Venezuela in a positive light.^{:44} The Venezuelan audience were said to be "moved" by the depiction of their complicated political reality on international film.^{:44}
