= Baralt Theatre =

Theatre in Maracaibo, Venezuela

Coordinates: 10°38′32″N 71°36′29″W

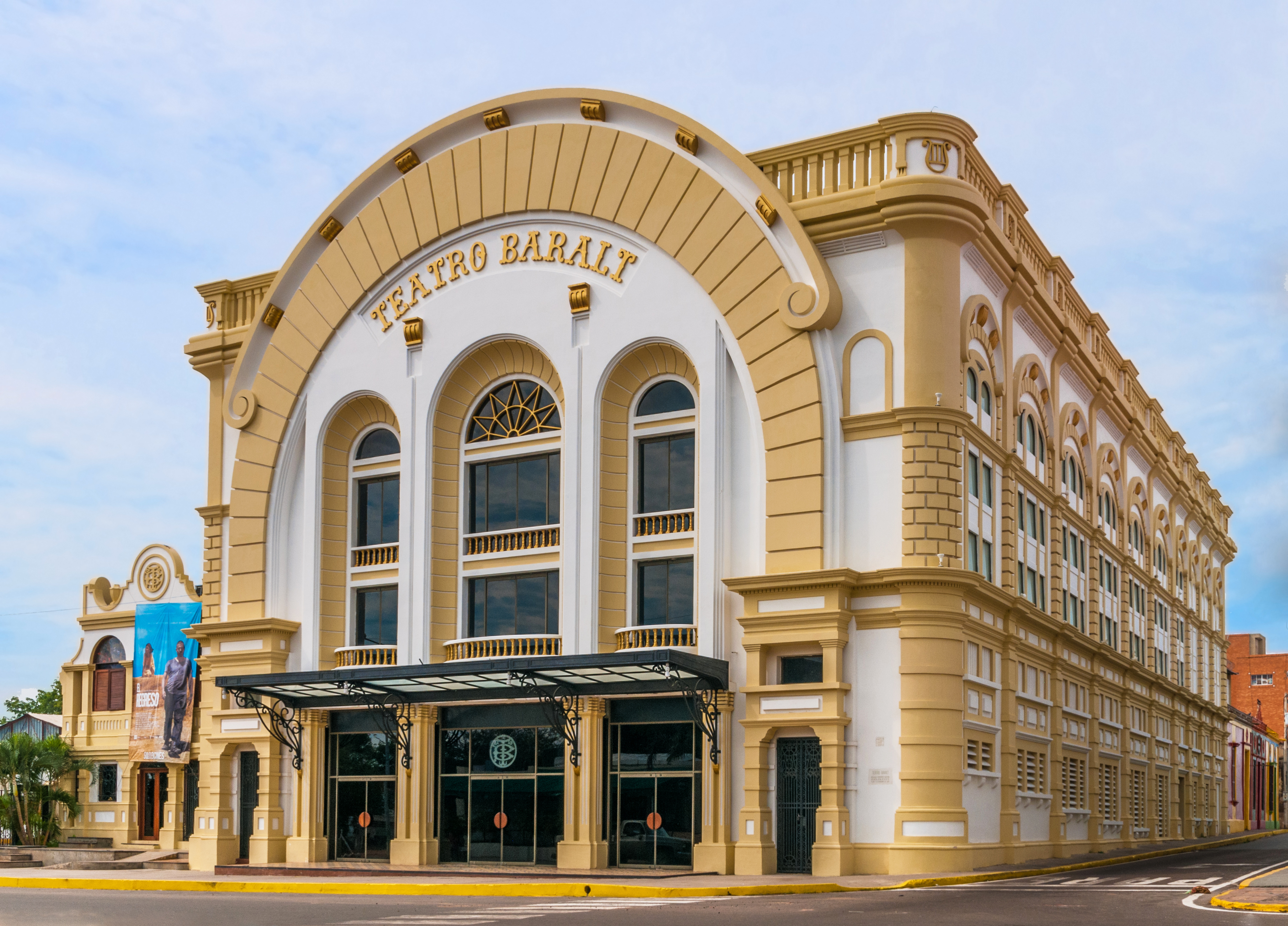
View from the corner of 95th Street and 5th Avenue

The Baralt Theatre (Spanish: Teatro Baralt) is a theatre in downtown Maracaibo, Venezuela, at the northwestern corner of the historic Plaza Bolívar. The first theatre at the site was built in the mid 19th century as a small performance hall, with subsequent theatre buildings there having seen many different reconstructions.

A major Venezuelan cultural institution, the theatre received a National Monument designation in 1981, recognizing its location as the site of the first film screenings in the country and as a longstanding part of the historic center of Maracaibo.

== Construction history ==
=== Early theatre ===
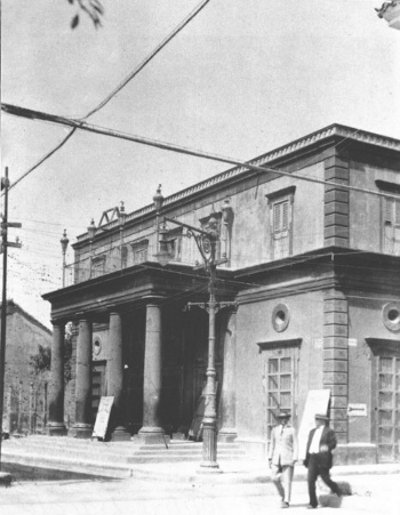
The theatre as it looked shortly after completion in 1883

The first request to build a theatre was submitted to the Court of Spain by José Domingo Rus in 1811, but this was not approved.

The first theatre began construction in 1839. The land it was built on was donated for this purpose by Don Miguel Antonio Baralt, who had inherited it from his father, the patriarch of the influential Baralt family in Venezuela (Miguel's son was Rafael María Baralt). Don Miguel often leased his land at the intersection of Urdaneta and Venezuela streets, where the theatre still stands, for performances; a temporary stage was constructed at the site before he donated it to the city. The land had become colloquially known as "el Teatro de Baralt" (Baralt's theatre) from the early 1800s.

The construction project soon received help from the workers' union and, on 5 December 1845, from the state when 3,000 pesos were allotted to "build a more permanent structure within the property of Don Miguel". This building was also known as Teatro de Baralt and was in use between the 1840s and 1877, at which point it was demolished to be replaced by a full theatre building.

=== Reconstructions ===
The President of the State of Zulia, Rafael Parra, signed off on the demolition and rebuild of the theatre on 28 July 1877; he laid the first stone of the new building in a ceremony on 7 October 1877. The new theatre was neoclassical, designed by Manuel de Obando, and inaugurated on 24 July 1883; the inauguration was combined with traditional festivities for the birthday of Simón Bolívar. This theatre was named Teatro Baralt, to honor the whole family. Notably, the debut of the theatre featured a national play, a rarity in Latin America; a competition was held to choose a play, and seven writers submitted entries in two categories. In the prose category, three writers entered, but the judges did not like any of the plays and simply drew a winner at random (Sufrir por culpas ajenas by Eduardo Gallegos Celis); the four verse entries were better received, with a first and second prize awarded. The winner here was Qué mujer by Octavio Hernández, and the runner-up was En el borde del abismo by Manuel Antonio Marín.

In 1928, the Governor of the State of Zulia, Vicente Pérez Soto, again announced a demolition and rebuild. The increased prosperity of the city, brought about by the development of the oil industry, and the resultant modernization of society, led Pérez Soto to want a building more in keeping with the city's enhanced status. The new theatre on this occasion was designed by Leon Jerome Hoet and opened on 19 December 1932, the anniversary of Juan Vicente Gómez' coup.

== Specifications ==
The theatre is in two halves: the first is the main theatre, featuring the stage, seating, and restrooms; the second is the public area, with a smoking area and restaurant. The seating consists of stalls at floor level and a raised circle, for a capacity of 3,000.

Externally, the facade has design features which have been described as Art Nouveau by the Venezuelan heritage board, including the balustrades and large arches in relief with detailing in iron above the entrance. It has a gable roof made of zinc with trusses. The structure also makes use of windows and large concrete latticework grilles to allow ventilation through the building to keep it cool; before this design, the theatre had made use of air ducts supplying cool air from an ice box with a fan in the basement. Attached to the theatre is a patio and a small pavilion in the same design.

Internally, there are extensive paintings and frescoes across the walls, ceilings and columns in an art deco style by Antonio Angulo, an artist from Zulia, who also designed light fixtures. The curtain was donated by the Spanish government for the 1932 opening, and was designed by César Bulbena.

== Monument and legacy ==
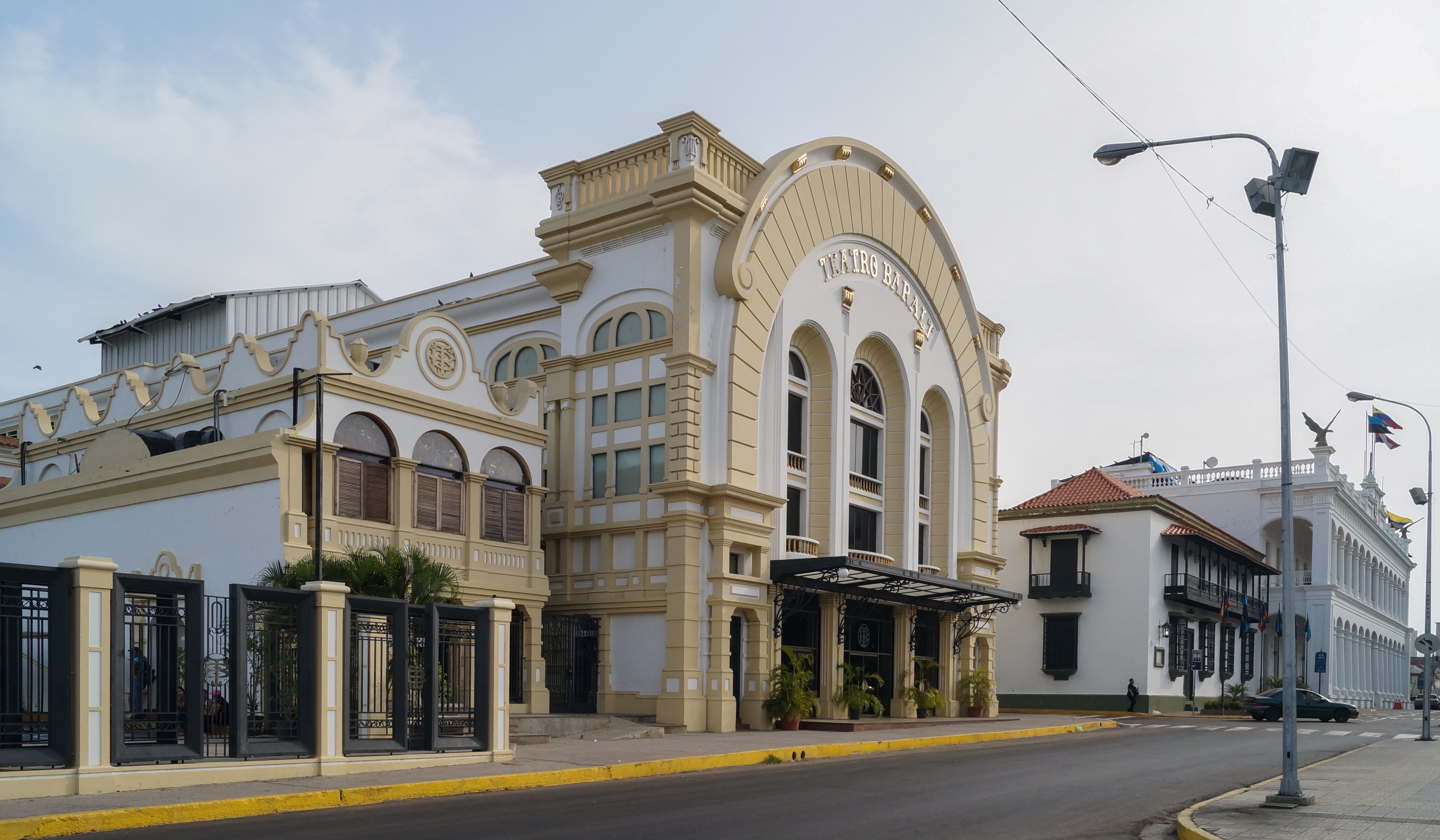
Teatro Baralt, with other monuments on the street seen to the right

The theatre was named a National Monument in November 1981. In terms of Venezuelan heritage listings, this is seen as the first step to becoming a World Heritage Site. From 1986 it underwent a long restoration, only re-opening in 1998. The restoration was led by Paolo D'onghia. During the restoration, D'onghia discovered the foundations of the original building, deciding to preserve these as well as Hoet's designs by creating a basement entrance. The floors for the lower entrance hall were designed by Francisco Hung, styled after a mosaic in the main entrance hall.

There are guided tours available at the theatre, which last half an hour and are run in the mornings.

The theatre is remembered nationally as the location of the first film screening in the country, on 11 July 1896, by Luis Manuel Méndez and Manuel Trujillo Durán. It also screened the first Venezuelan-made films on 28 January 1897, two Maracaibo shorts, Un célebre especialista sacando muelas en el gran Hotel Europa and Muchachos bañándose en la laguna de Maracaibo. Later, in 1912, a film was recorded in the theatre by Alciro Ferrebús Rincón and José García Rebot, titled Maracaibo en el teatro Baralt. It was at one point home to the University of Zulia's cinema club.

The Venezuelan National Short Film Festival, named after Trujillo Durán, is held annually in the theatre in the last week of January, and is co-hosted by the theatre foundation and the University of Zulia.

== Sources ==
- "Zulia Monuments: Teatro Baralt". Institutional Assets and Monuments of Venezuela (in Spanish). 4 August 2016.
- Arteaga Jurado, Alejandro (2007a). "Sus Orígenes". Renacer de sueños – La historia del Teatro Baralt. Zaida Gotera de Prado (President of the Fundación Teatro Baralt), Nereida Petit (architecture historian), Aleksie García (Coordinator at the Centro Rafael Urdaneta). Universidad Rafael Belloso Chacín. Archived from the original on 15 November 2021.
- Arteaga Jurado, Alejandro (2007b). "Su Estructura". Renacer de sueños – La historia del Teatro Baralt. Zaida Gotera de Prado (President of the Fundación Teatro Baralt), Nereida Petit (architecture historian), Aleksie García (Coordinator at the Centro Rafael Urdaneta). Universidad Rafael Belloso Chacín. Archived from the original on 15 November 2021.
- Arteaga Jurado, Alejandro (2007c). "Lo Artístico, El Teatro hoy en día". Renacer de sueños – La historia del Teatro Baralt. Zaida Gotera de Prado (President of the Fundación Teatro Baralt), Nereida Petit (architecture historian), Aleksie García (Coordinator at the Centro Rafael Urdaneta). Universidad Rafael Belloso Chacín. Archived from the original on 15 November 2021.
- Knapp Jones, Willis (24 July 2014). Behind Spanish American Footlights. University of Texas Press. pp. 340–341. ISBN 9781477300169.
- "Teatro Baralt". Lonely Planet.
- "Cines Unidos conmemora el Día Nacional del Cine". Analitica (in Spanish). 3 February 2019.
- Semprún Parra, Jesús Ángel; Hernández, Luis Guillermo (11 January 2018). Diccionario General del Zulia (in Spanish). Vol. 1. Sultana del Lago.
- Paz García, Jesús (9 May 2019). "Festival de cortometrajes nacional prepara su XV edición". La Verdad (in Spanish). Archived from the original on 10 November 2019.
- Panorama (26 January 2018). "Un total de 64 cortos compiten en el Festival Nacional "Manuel Trujillo Durán"" (in Spanish). Archived from the original on 10 November 2019.
