= The Monroe Doctrine (film) =

- Produced by: Thomas Edison
- Starring: Charles F. Walton; John Mayon
- Release date: April 23, 1896 (New York City)
- Country: United States

The Monroe Doctrine, also known as The Venezuela Case,^{:52} is an 1896 American propaganda film. It features an allegorical fight over national determinism between the British Empire, the United States and Venezuela. As of 2021, the film is considered lost.

== Plot ==
John Bull arrives at a shoreline that represents Venezuela and starts attacking it with guns, overwhelming the country.^{:27} Uncle Sam arrives from the back of the image and grabs Bull by the neck. Defeating and making an example of him, Sam forces Bull to his knees and has him remove his hat for Venezuela.^{:viii} Sam has stood up for the principles of the Monroe Doctrine.^{:27}

== Cast ==
- Charles F. Walton, known for performing in boxing films and for his lanky physique, as Uncle Sam.^{:27}
- John Mayon, a replacement of Walton's rival John Slavin known for being stout, as John Bull.^{:27}

== Background and release ==
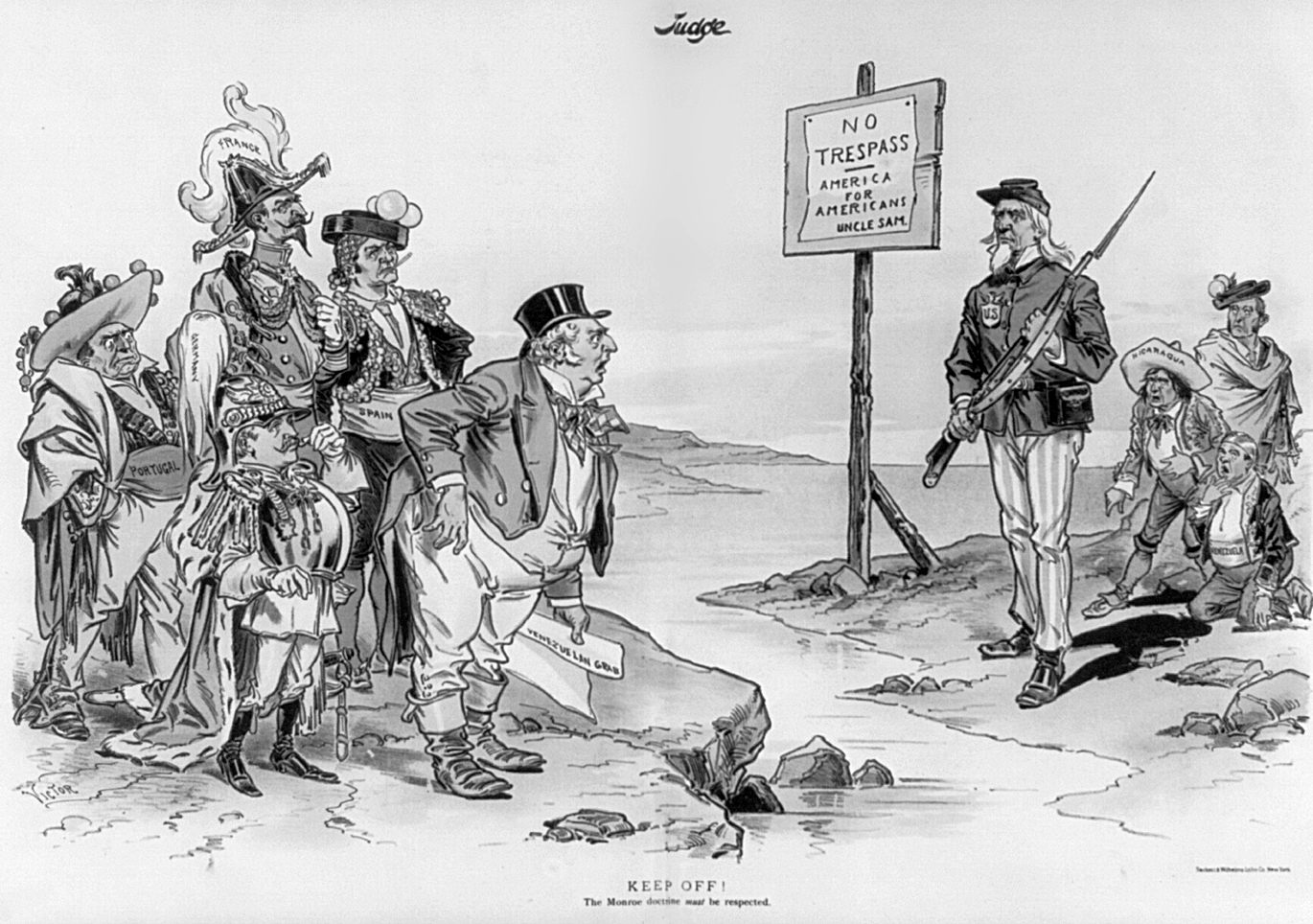
In Victor Gillam's 1896 political cartoon, Uncle Sam stands with rifle between European figures and representatives of Nicaragua and Venezuela

The film was made by the Edison company as a release film for their Vitascope in 1896.^{:viii} It depicted a political dispute that stemmed from a longstanding disagreement over land sovereignty between British Guiana and Venezuela. Miners from Venezuela had begun exploiting the disputed land, and the British warned them off with threats of armed intervention. The United States, in its assumed role as the protector of Latin America from European political forces, mediated to prevent a conflict.^{:52}

Film historian Charles Musser wrote that the film was "doubtlessly inspired by a political cartoon" depicting the same conflict published earlier in the year.^{:52} It was made in April 1896^{:26} and premiered at the release of the Vitascope at Koster and Bial's Music Hall in New York City on April 23, 1896; according to the New York Herald the audience were "delighted" by the film and the American dominance shown.^{:viii}^{:116} The film selection for the premiere had been curated by Raff & Gammon,^{:26} and it was the first commercially successful film screening in the United States.

In July of the same year, it became the first picture to be shown in Venezuela, where the people of Maracaibo were reportedly "moved" that a film representing their country was made.^{:43-44}

== Analysis ==
The Monroe Doctrine is described by Musser as a "comic allegory" that was "overtly political".^{:viii} This has been noted particularly in its first context, occupying the fifth spot in the running order at the Vitascope's premiere; it came after Walton & Slavin, a burlesque boxing match between allegorical Uncle Sam and John Bull figures, and Band Drill (a section of Milk White Flag),^{:viii} in which American soldiers march off to war.^{:27} Musser also compared it to the second film shown that night, Sea Waves at Dover, which shows detail of the waves at Dover in England battering the shore, reflecting the allegorical imagery used in this film.^{:27} The choice of patriotic narrative in the films may have been selected to itself allegorically fight an expected influx of devices similar to the Vitasope from European projection manufacturers,^{:27}^{:viii} or to warn the French film companies away from expanding their market into the Americas.^{:52} Media historians James Chapman and Nicholas J. Cull refer to it as "probably the first propaganda film".^{:1}
