= Carlos Ruiz Chapellín =

Venezuelan showman (1865–1912)

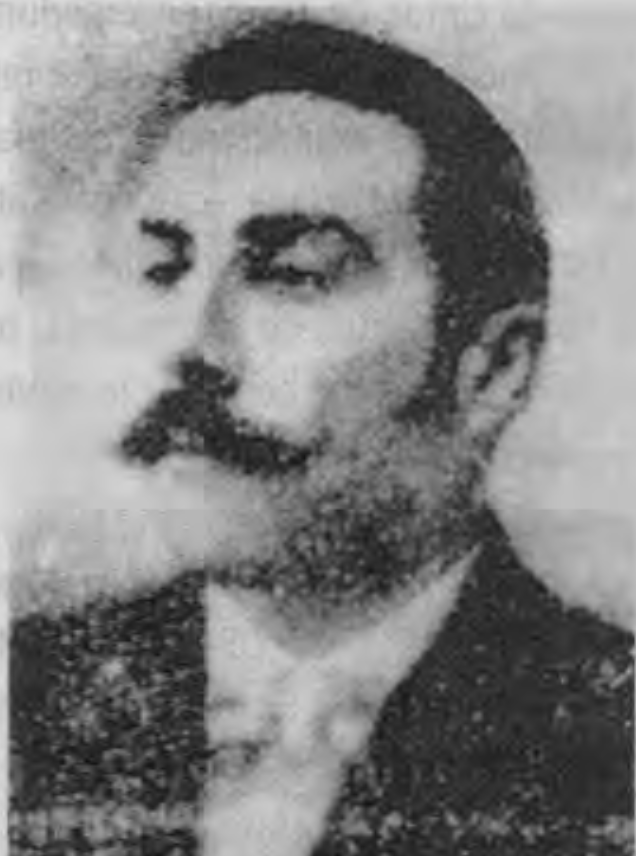
- A photograph of Ruiz Chapellín
- Born: 1865; Caracas, Venezuela
- Died: August 1912 (aged 46–47)
- Resting place: Southern General Cemetery, Caracas

Carlos Ruiz Chapellín (1865 – August 1912) was a Venezuelan showman, filmmaker and performer around the turn of the 20th century. During this period, public entertainment began to grow in Venezuela. Having seen early examples of musical plays and films become popular, Ruiz Chapellín was inspired to produce for the theatre as well as cinema.

Though film was a relatively brief intermission in his business as a showman and theatre producer, he is best remembered for creating slapstick comedy films in the late 19th century. He was one of the first filmmakers in Venezuela; unusually for the era, he created films which had attempts at narrative stories, rather than actuality, and showed his and other films in lower-class venues at a time when the technology was otherwise considered upper class.

In theatre, he produced comedic zarzuelas during the time of development of modern Venezuelan theatre, with his work receiving displays of support from the president. Both his shows and films were noted for their Venezuelan identity and relevance to the common people of his country.

== Early and later life ==
Carlos Ruiz Chapellín was born in 1865 in Caracas, Venezuela. He had at least one sibling, a brother named Adolfo. Ruiz Chapellín focused on being a writer in his later life, and was editor of the newspaper Las Tijeras. He died in August 1912, and is interred at the Southern General Cemetery in Caracas.

== Theatre career ==
Ruiz Chapellín's first known business was in producing popular shows, and he continued working in this field even when he later pursued other endeavors. In 1896, the Spanish Children's Zarzuela Company performed the popular zarzuela (a traditional form of variety show) El rey que rabió in Venezuela, which was particularly influential and provoked Ruiz Chapellín to create his own zarzuela company. The shows he went on to produce tended be more comedic than Spanish zarzuelas, being more like sainetes, and drew on Venezuelan culture.

In 1903, Ruiz Chapellín and his brother created another youth theatre company. Cipriano Castro, president and general of Venezuela, watched the company's 1904 performance of El rey que rabió and afterwards offered to build them a theatre in a show of official support. In the early years of the 20th century, the brothers' traveling shows were often dedicated to Castro, who also attended their premiere of Un percance en Macuto, a zarzuela written by Ruiz Chapellín and Pedro Elías Gutiérrez. Around the same time, Ruiz Chapellín was based at the Teatro Municipal of Caracas with bandmaster Vicente Martucci; according to Martucci, this is where Venezuelan theatre started out, with the pair involved.

Ruiz Chapellín discovered some child stars performing in small local theatres, bringing them into his regular company. One of these was Rafael Guinand, who starred in a Ruiz Chapellín brothers production of Juan José, which was accompanied by Gutiérrez, at the Teatro Municipal in Barquisimeto before it was officially opened. Guinand would go on to write the play El rompimiento, the adaptation of which was the first sound and feature-length Venezuelan film.

== Filmmaking ==
In 1897, shortly after it opened, Ruiz Chapellín rented the Circo Metropolitano de Caracas, where he would show zarzuelas and circus variety shows. He also planned to go into the film business at the Circo, being aware of the first Venezuelan films that had been shown and proved popular in Maracaibo in January 1897; Ruiz Chapellín formed a partnership with Ricardo Rouffet to create their own films. Rouffet was a Venezuelan inventor, principally in telegraphy, who in 1895 had registered his invention of a "Kinefonoscopio", which could project moving pictures and play a soundtrack at the same time, with the Ministerio de Fomento. Ruiz Chapellín also hired a man, W. O. Wolcopt from the United States, as part of this venture. Wolcopt brought a Projectoscope from New York, which was displayed in the Circo from 26 June to 14 July 1897. Ruiz Chapellín and Wolcopt may have shown a film called Disputa entre Andracistas y Rojistas, which showed a fight between supporters of that year's political candidates Ignacio Andrade and Juan Pablo Rojas Paúl; the nature of the film suggests a Venezuelan author, but there are few records of it. After the show, Wolcopt traveled the country for four months with the Projectoscope before returning to Caracas.

Ruiz Chapellín then hired Gabriel Veyre to show his Cinematograph at the Circo after seeing him project another film at the Fortuna Hall in Caracas. Ruiz Chapellín and Veyre had a dispute, with Ruiz Chapellín writing to Veyre's mother to say Veyre was in breach of his contract; Veyre fled the country to Colombia, but his Cinematograph, which could both record and project film, may have been used to make Ruiz Chapellín's films. In February and March 1898, Ruiz Chapellín also had a partnership with the Compañía Acrobática Universal to show films in Caracas.

Dr. Jesús Ricardo Azuaga García, a Central University of Venezuela (UCV) academic in audiovisual communication, described Ruiz Chapellín's choice to hold film showings in a circus as "gaudy", as the previous screenings were held in spectacular theatres and halls, but also suggests it was Ruiz Chapellín's attempt to "truly bring cinema to the popular classes". Yolanda Sueiro Villanueva, author and professor of film history at UCV, discussed how, in Venezuela at the time, the arts were housed in social spaces exclusive to the upper classes that participated in them, specifically mentioning the estado Sarría – the setting of one of Ruiz Chapellín's films, Una paliza en el estado Sarría – as an area that was derided; Ruiz Chapellín attempted to change this, by screening in a lower-class space, and by presenting the areas and issues relevant to its occupants' lives in this film.

Elisa Martínez de Badra, professor of social communication at Andrés Bello Catholic University, reviewed the cinema of early Venezuela in brief by suggesting that the partnership of Ruiz Chapellín and Wolcopt, along with the first Venezuelan films shown in January 1897, can be considered early examples of attempts at narrative cinema; Azuaga García wrote that Ruiz Chapellín's second film, Carlos Ruiz peleando con un cochero, in particular was almost certainly deliberately staged instead of actuality, and could be the first such example.

=== Films ===
Ruiz Chapellín and Rouffet are considered the creators of the films Una paliza en el estado Sarría ('A fight in the estado Sarría') and Carlos Ruiz peleando con un cochero ('Carlos Ruiz fighting with a coachman'), slapstick comedy films in which they also starred. They were premiered at the Circo Metropolitano on 26 November 1897. In November 1897, advertisements in Caracas started promoting "the new Projectoscope", claiming it played in color, and "criollo views", referring to this pair of films. They also claimed that they would be the first Venezuelan-made films to play in the capital. The films may have been advertised to the French as showing "real things" from life in the Caracas area, despite a level of fiction. Details on neither Rouffet nor the films were published in the local press, suggesting that they were critically overlooked, a contrast to press coverage of early films in Maracaibo.

Una paliza... was shown before its pair, Carlos Ruiz peleando..., but less is known of it. The "estado Sarría" of the title refers to a location in La Candelaria, Caracas, a neighborhood nicknamed this after a hippodrome in the area that was demolished in 1896, itself named for landowner Julio F. Sarría. In Carlos Ruiz peleando..., Ruiz Chapellín as a character gets into a stagecoach heist and a fight with its coachman; Azuaga García noted that the devised situation makes this film an early attempt at narrative staging, which could be considered proto-Western.

Sueiro Villanueva proposed that Rouffet was the active director of the films (with Ruiz Chapellín starring and functioning more like a producer), but also proposes that someone else altogether could have handled the camera, acting as director but staying absent from the public screenings.

Ruiz Chapellín then made the 1899 film Joropo de negros en el Orinoco, a joropo film featuring native peoples of the Orinoco. This was likely screened in Caracas in May, when it was highlighted in a local newspaper. It was the second short film to feature traditional joropo music, starting a trend that persisted into Venezuelan-produced films of the sound era. Vásquez wrote that the use of joropo in film both reflected the culture of, and was popular among, the Venezuelan people.

== Sources ==
Literature

- Rojas Uzcátegui, José de la Cruz. (1986). Historia y crítica del teatro venezolano : siglo XIX. Mérida: Universidad de los Andes, Dirección de Cultura, Facultad de Humanidades y Educación, Instituto de Investigaciones Literarias "Gonzalo Picón Febres". ISBN 9802210455. OCLC 17963067.
- Martínez de Badra, Elisa (2011). El guión: fin y transición [The script: end and transition]. Universidad Católica Andres Bello. ISBN 9789802441433.
- Sueiro Villanueva, Yolanda (2007). Inicios de la exhibición cinematográfica en Caracas (1896-1905) [Beginnings of the cinema exhibition in Caracas (1896-1905)] (in Spanish) (1 ed.). Caracas: Fondo Editorial de Humanidades y Educación, Universidad Central de Venezuela. ISBN 978-9800023952. OCLC 225867560.
- Serrano, Arturo. "The Beginnings of Cinema in Venezuela: The arrival of Cinema in Venezuela (1896–1907)". Universidad Católica Andrés Bello.
- Filmografía 1897-1938 [Filmography 1897-1938] (in Spanish). Fundación Cinemateca Nacional. 1997. ISBN 980-074532-7.
- Azuaga García, Jesús Ricardo (September 2015). Pandemonium: La Filmografia de Roman Chalbaud en el Cine Venezolano: Contexto y Analisis [Pandemonium: The Filmography of Roman Chalbaud and the Cinema of Venezuela] (PDF) (Thesis) (in Spanish). Universitat de Valencia.
- Vásquez, Ruper Rafael (21 January 2014). La música popular tradicional en el cine venezolano en la década de los noventas (PhD thesis) (in Spanish).
- Pérez, Maén Puerta de (2003). "Una visión del teatro infantil venezolano". Archipielago. Revista cultural de nuestra América (in Spanish). 11 (42). ISSN 1402-3357.
- Villanueva, Yolanda Sueiro (2024). "Melodías del cine: las regias funciones cinematográficas pre-talkies en Caracas, 1899-1930". Archivo Vallejo (in Spanish). 7 (13): 289–320. doi:10.59885/archivoVallejo.2024.v7n13.13. hdl:10481/86222. ISSN 2663-9254.
- Núñez, Lisbeth (2 June 2015). Teatro costumbrista Tres Autores Tres Épocas (Venezuela 1838-1942) (Thesis thesis) (in Spanish).
- Yanes, Oscar (2004). Así son las cosas... (in Spanish). Vol. 5. Planeta. ISBN 978-980-271-331-8.
- Eloy Gutiérrez, Jesús (2024). "La dimensión cultural del gomecismo" (PDF). Revista Comunicación (in Spanish) (207–208 ed.): 175–189.
- Landaeta Rosales, Manuel (1920). Hoja de servicios e índice de publicaciones historicas y estadisticas (in Spanish). Emp. El Cojo.
- Morales Lara, Julio (10 December 1932). "Entrevista hecha al maestro Martucci". Billiken. No. 682. Caracas.
- Sueiro, Yolanda (2001). "Pictura loquens: evolución del sonido cinematográfico y su repercusión en las exhibiciones de cine en Caracas (1897-1935)". Secuencias: Revista de historia del cine. Autonomous University of Madrid. p. 9. ISSN 1134-6795. Archived from the original on 10 July 2020.
- Bifano, José Luis (2001). "El indetenible avance de los inventos" (PDF). Inventos, inventores e invenciones: del siglo XIX venezolano (in Spanish). Fundación Polar. pp. 222–224, 239.

Other

- Monumental Ciudad de Caracas (2014). "Cementerio General del Sur en Caracas: Carlos Ruiz Chapellin 1856 - 1912". Flickr.
- Serrano, Arturo (10 November 2014). "Los heroes del cine venezolano (Parte I)" [The heroes of Venezuelan cinema (Part 1)]. Vice Versa (in Spanish).
- de Miranda, Nancy (2019). "Cronología del Cine Venezolano" [Chronology of Venezuelan Cinema] (in Spanish). Observatorio Cine.
- Vivas, Norderlin (6 June 2011). "El urbanista cuenta en pocas páginas de su libro la historia de la zona ubicada en La Candelaria" [The urban planner recounts in a few pages of his book the history of the settled zone in La Candelaria]. Candelaria Viva (in Spanish).
- Delgado Gómez, Antonio (1939). The Rapture (1939). Casanova, Armando (screenplay); Guinand, Rafael (play); Martínez Pozueta, Juan (cinematography); Carrasquel, Gonzalo E. (production design); Plaza Ponte, Antonio (sound) – via Mubi.
- Rojas, Lorena (12 February 2022). "Teatro Juares: joya arquitectónica en el centro de Barquisimeto". La Prensa de Lara (in Spanish).
