= Gabriel Veyre =

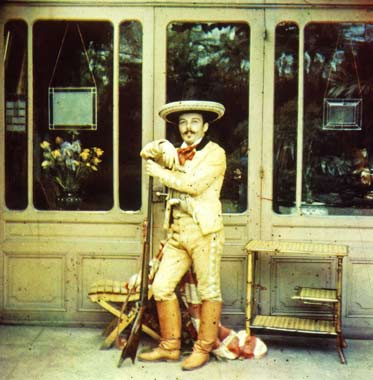
- A self-portrait taken in 1898 with the Lumière Trichrome process
- Born: Gabriel Antoine Veyre; February 1, 1871; Septème, France
- Died: January 13, 1936 (aged 64); Casablanca, Morocco
- Occupations: Filmmaker, photographer
- Years active: 1896 - 1936

Gabriel Veyre (February 1, 1871 – January 13, 1936) was a French early film director and photographer known for his work in Mexico, Indochina and Morocco.

== Education and career ==
Veyre graduated in pharmacy from Lyon University. In 1896, he traveled along with Claude Ferdinand Von Bernard to Latin America, in order to show the early films made by the Lumière Brothers and to exploit the cinematograph.

Between 1896 and 1897, he directed and produced 35 films in Mexico, with Von Bernard as the camera operator. Many of those films feature the Mexican president Porfirio Díaz in daily activities.

After leaving Mexico, he continued touring Canada, Japan, China and Indochina. His films and autochromes were presented in Paris in the 1900 Exposition Universelle.

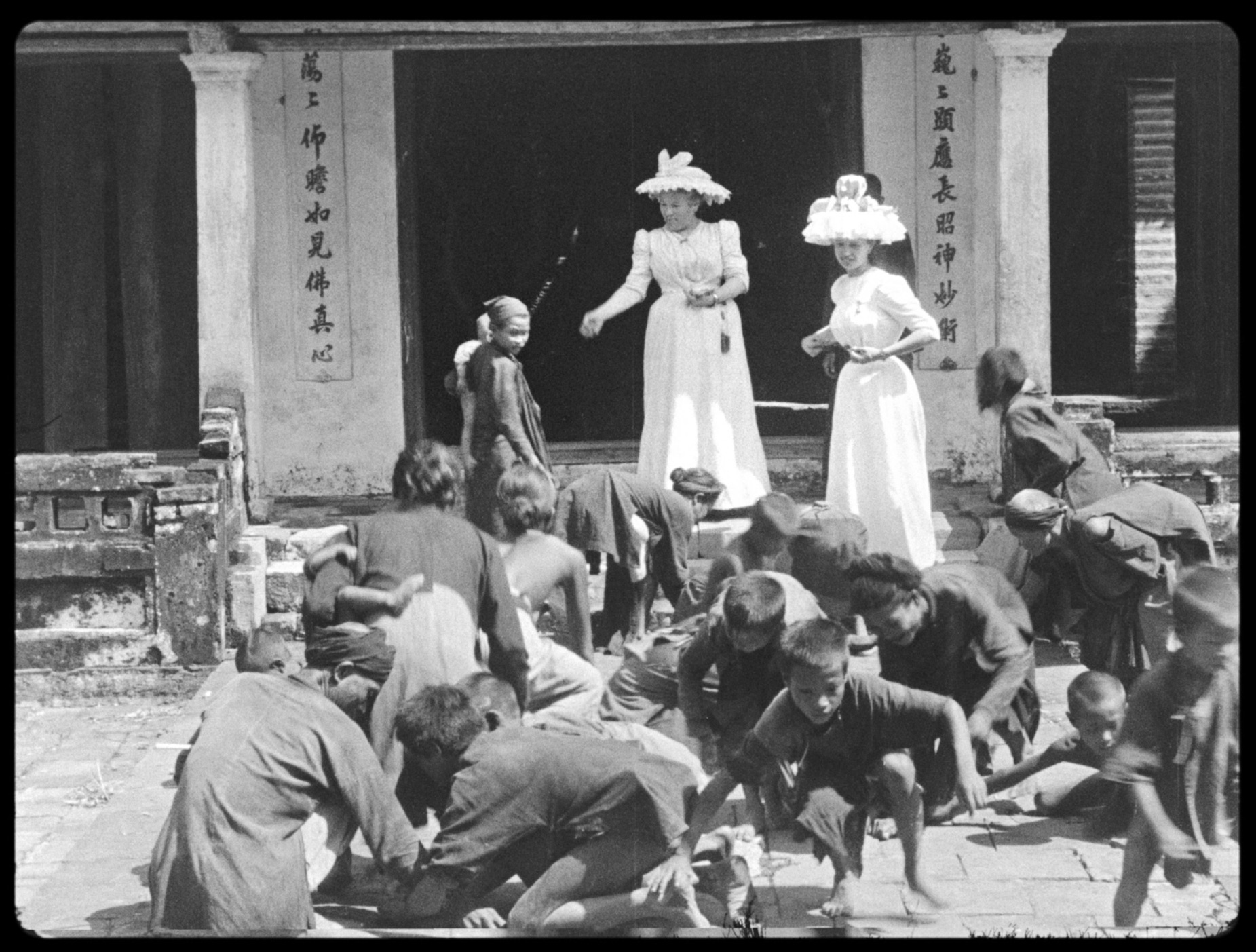
A film shot by Gabriel Veyre in French Indochina (current Vietnam) depicting two French women tossing Sapèques into a crowd of Annamite (Vietnamese) children.

He continued his work in Morocco where he also worked as a correspondent for L'Illustration. He published the book Dans l'intimité du Sultan in 1905. Veyre remained in Casablanca until his death in 1936.

On his travels, Veyre both exhibited Lumière films and made his own. Some of his work is preserved at the Paris-based Cinémathèque Française.

== Bibliography ==
- Gabriel Veyre, Dans l'intimité du Sultan, au Maroc 1901-1905, reissued in 2009, 251p.
- Philippe Jacquier et Marion Pranal, Gabriel Veyre, opérateur Lumière - Autour du monde avec le Cinématographe -Correspondance (1896–1900), éd. Institut Lumière / Actes Sud, 1996, 289p.
- Farid Abdelouahab, Philippe Jacquier et Marion Pranal, Le Maroc de Gabriel Veyre : 1901-1936, Kubik Editions, 2005, 191p. ISBN 978-2-35083-018-6

== Personal life ==
Philippe Jacquier is the heir of Veyre.
