= Saigon (ward) =

Ward and capital of Ho Chi Minh City, Vietnam

Saigon Phường Sài Gòn Bến Nghé
- Ward
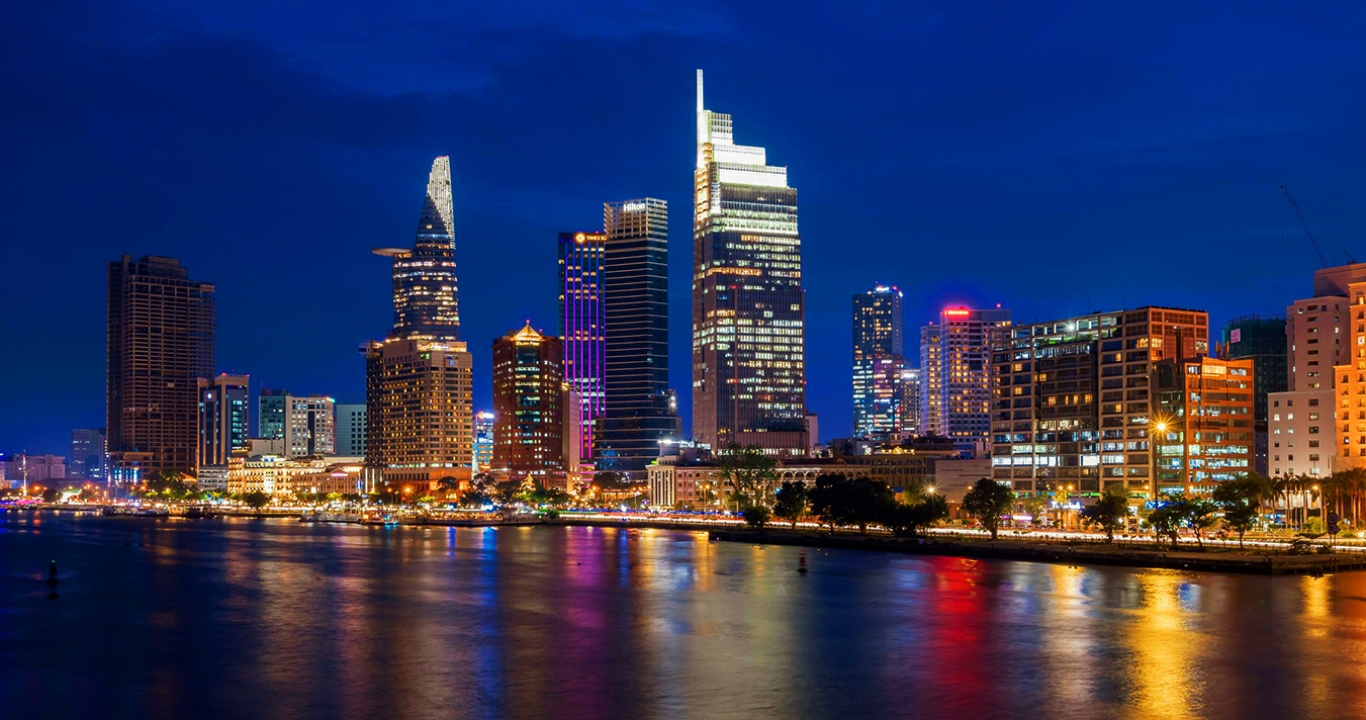
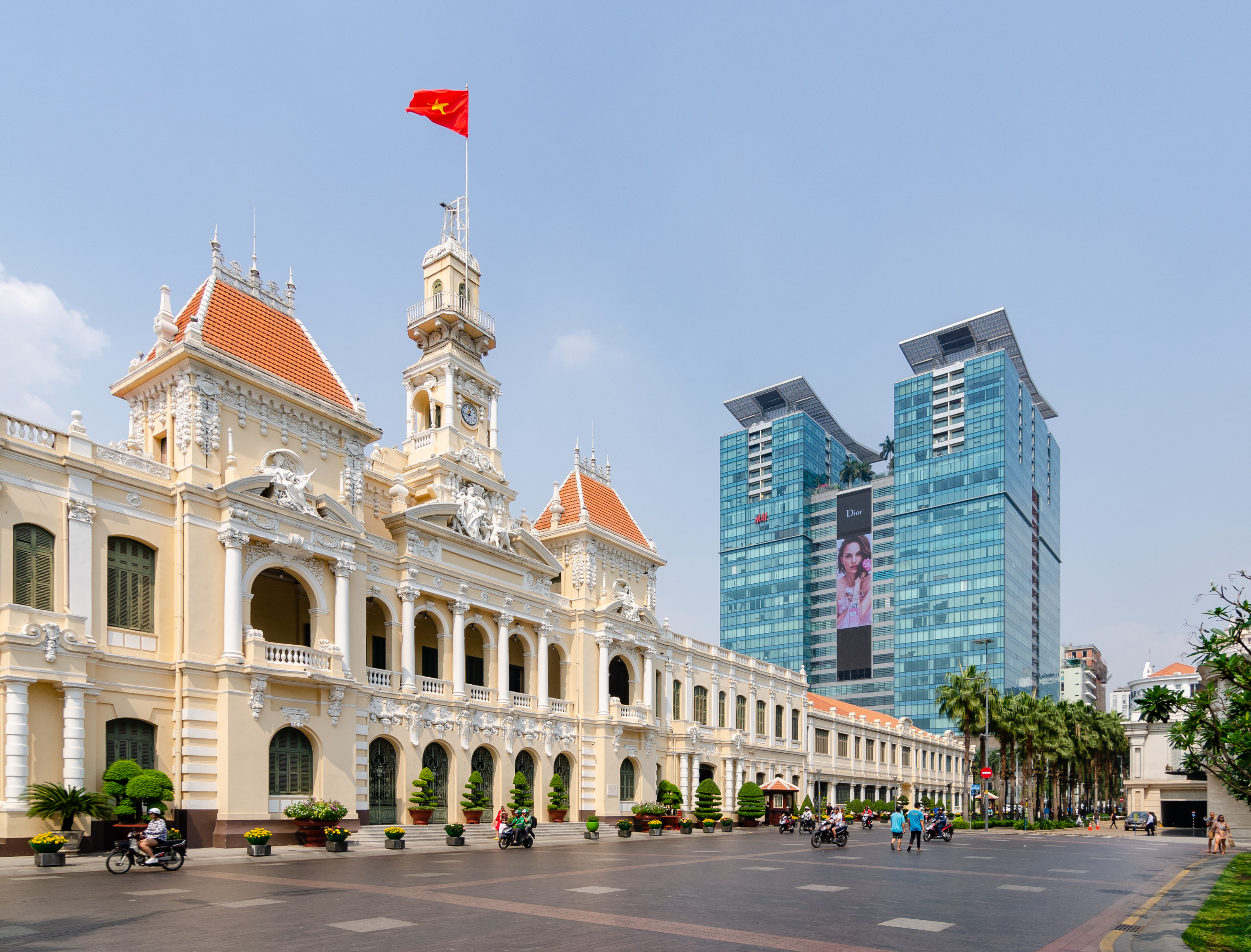
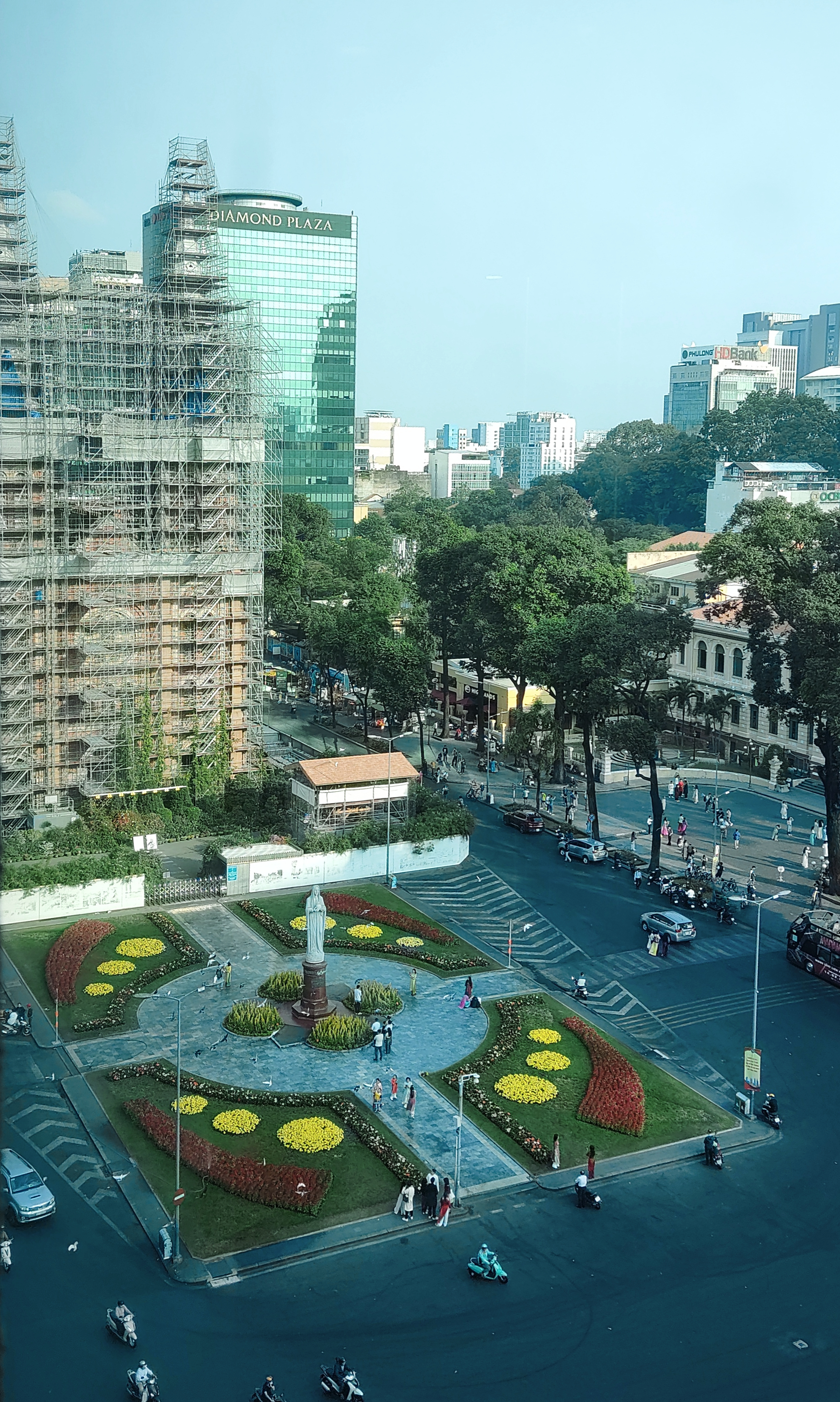
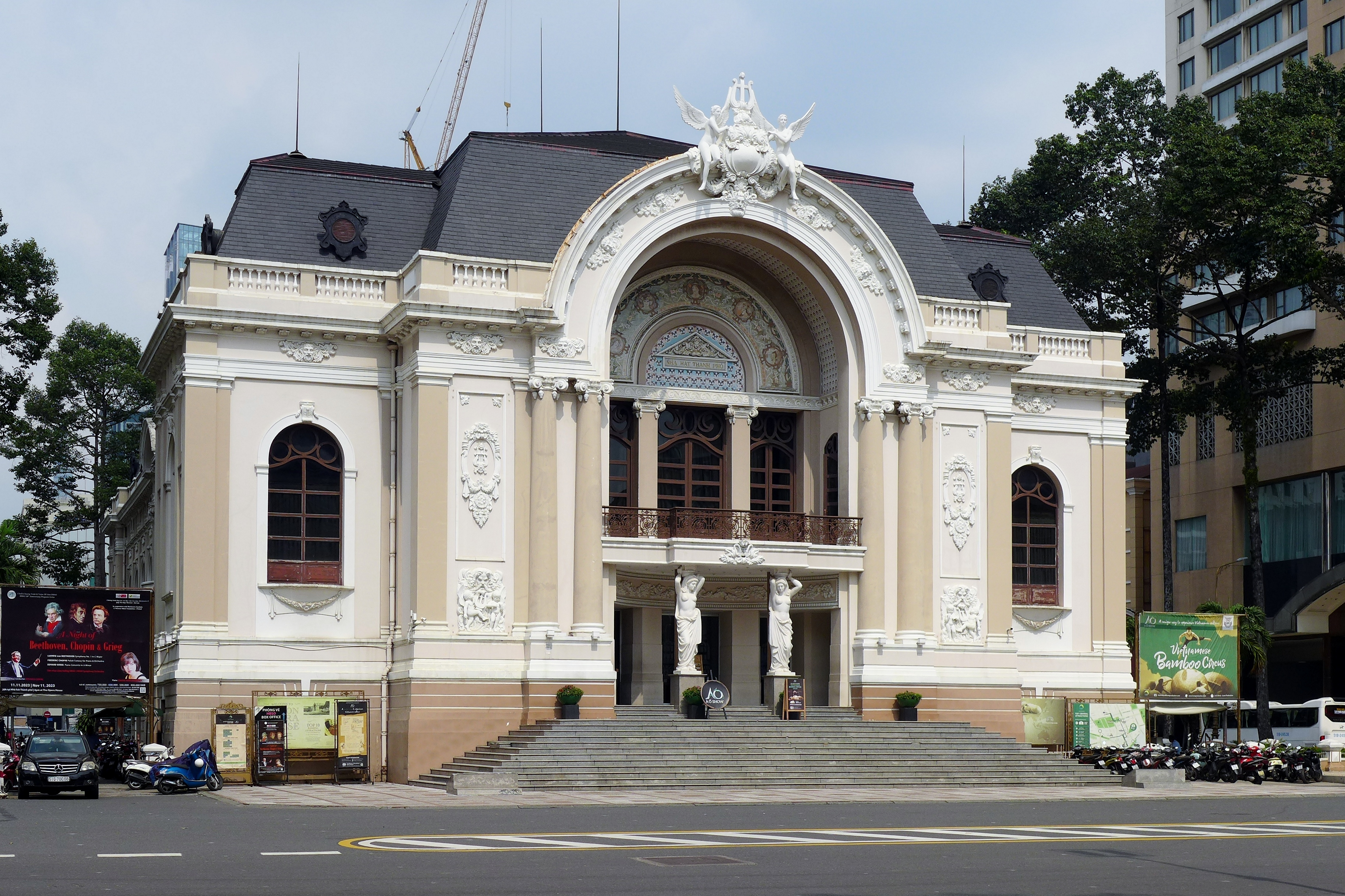
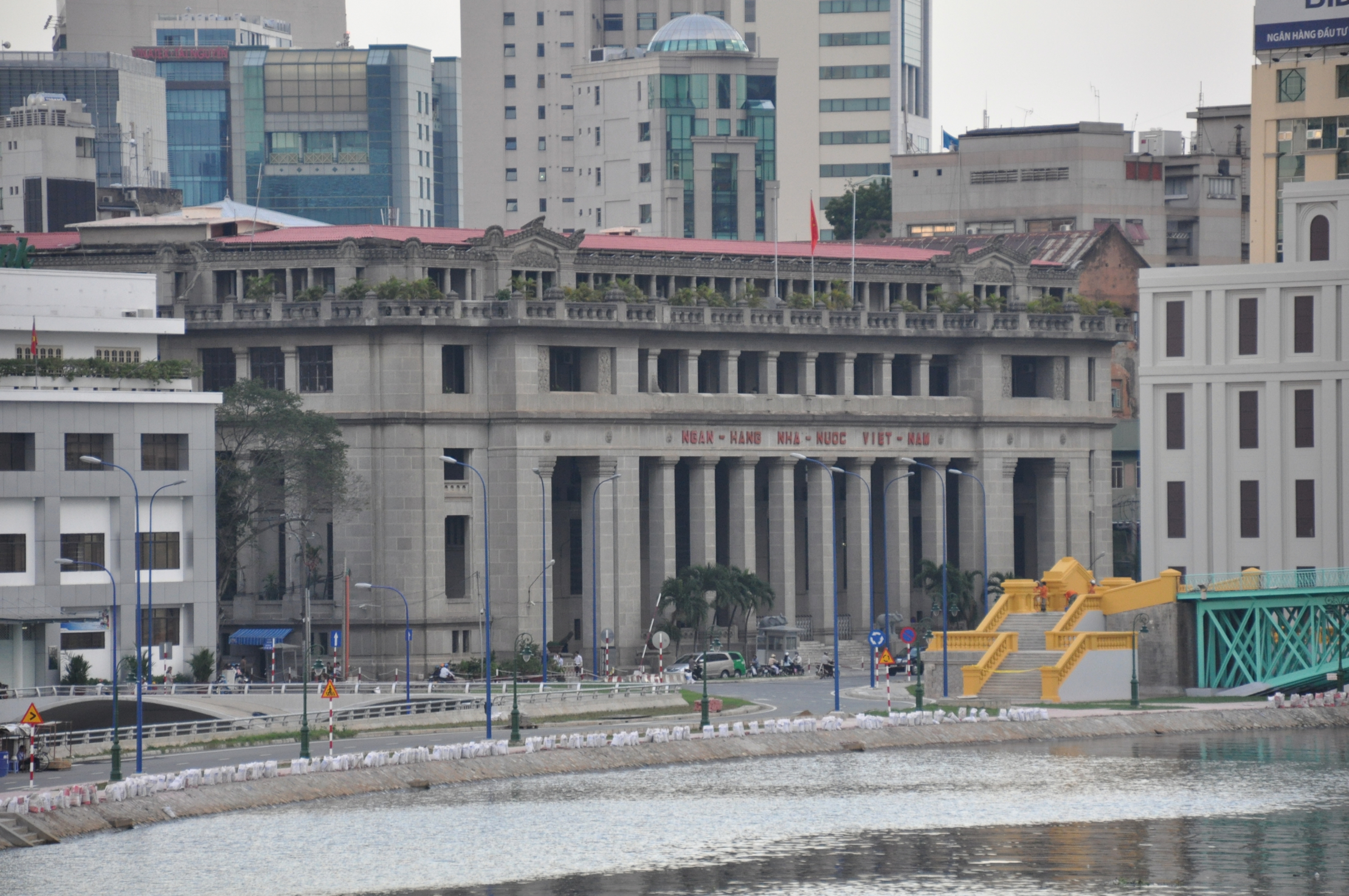
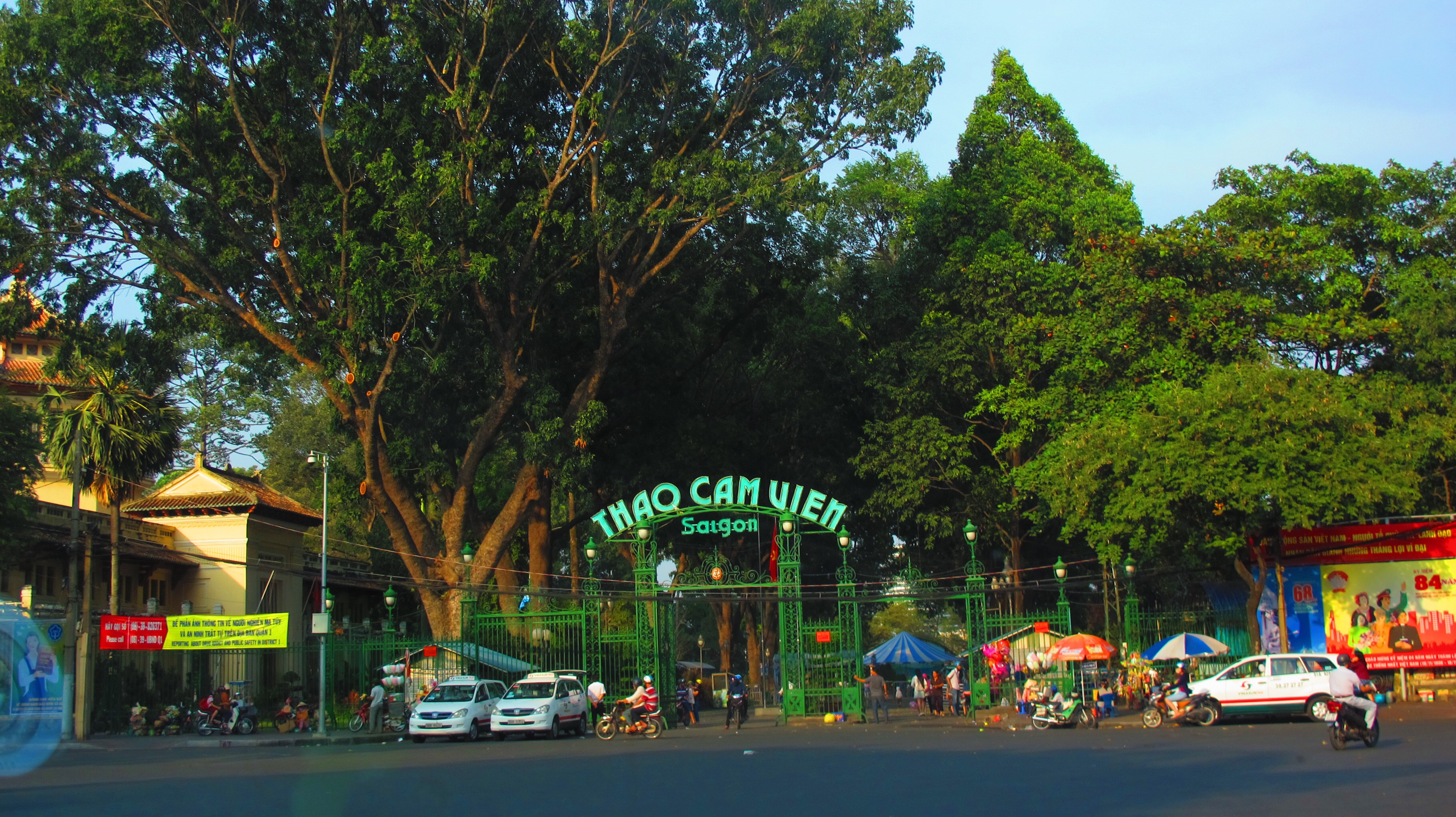
- Clockwise from top: Bạch Đằng Quay skyline at night viewed from Ba Son Bridge, Saigon Opera House, Saigon Zoo and Botanical Gardens, Ho Chi Minh City Branch of State Bank of Vietnam, Ho Chi Minh City Hall with Vincom Center Đồng Khởi, Notre-Dame Cathedral Basilica of Saigon at the Paris Commune Square
- Interactive map of Saigon
- Coordinates: 10°46′50″N 106°41′57″E
- Country: Vietnam
- Centrally- governed city: Ho Chi Minh City
- Established: June 16, 2025

Area
  - Total: 1.17 sq mi (3.04 km^{2})

Population (2024)
  - Total: 47,022
  - Density: 40,100/sq mi (15,500/km^{2})
- Time zone: UTC+07:00 (Indochina Time)
- Administrative code: 26740

Saigon (Vietnamese: Phường Sài Gòn) is a ward and administrative center of Ho Chi Minh City, Vietnam. It is one of the 168 new wards, communes and special zones of the city following the nation-wide administrative reform in 2025.

Saigon ward is the city's de facto downtown, central business district and administrative center. Prior to the ward's establishment, Saigon was the historic and colloquial name for Ho Chi Minh City's central area, roughly corresponding to the former District 1. It was also the official name for the capital city of the State of Vietnam (as Đô thành Sài Gòn-Chợ Lớn), the Republic of Vietnam (as Đô thành Sài Gòn), and the Republic of South Vietnam (as Thành phố Sài Gòn-Gia Định).

== Geography ==
The ward of Saigon is located in the central core of Ho Chi Minh City, bordering:

- Bến Thành ward (south, bounded by Nam Kỳ Khởi Nghĩa St.);
- Tân Định ward (west, bounded by Nguyễn Đình Chiểu St.);
- Xuân Hòa ward (southwest, separated by streets of Hai Bà Trưng and Nguyễn Thị Minh Khai);
- Gia Định ward (northwest, bounded by Thị Nghè Canal);
- Thạnh Mỹ Tây ward (north, bounded by Thị Nghè Canal);
- Xóm Chiếu ward (southeast, bounded by Bến Nghé Channel);
- An Khánh ward (east, with bounded by Saigon River).

According to Official Dispatch No. 2896/BNV-CQĐP dated May 27, 2025 of the Ministry of Home Affairs, following the merger, Sài Gòn has a land area of 3.04 km², the population as of December 31, 2024 is 47,022 people, and the population density is 15,468 people/km².

== History ==
=== Etymological history ===
The first known human habitation in the area was either a Cham settlement called Baigaur, or a Cambodian city named Prey Nokor, which was a small fishing village. Over time, under the control of the Vietnamese, it was officially renamed Gia Định (嘉定) in 1698, a name that was retained until the time of the French conquest in the 1860s, when it adopted the name Sài Gòn, francized as Saïgon, although the city was still indicated as 嘉 定 on Vietnamese maps written in chữ Hán until at least 1891.

Ho Chi Minh City has a history of administrative management of more than 300 years, since 1698 when Lord Nguyễn Hữu Cảnh established Gia Định Province. Over that time, the place has had many different names used to refer to the entire land or a part of the area, such as Saigon, Chợ Lớn, Gia Định, Bến Nghé, Phiên An, Phan Yên. Of which, Saigon is the most popular name in administrative management as well as community and cultural life.

In 1976, the National Assembly officially renamed Saigon–Gia Định (established from the merge of City of Saigon and Province of Gia Định) as Ho Chi Minh City. For the almost 50 years since then, Saigon has no longer been used in formal contexts, but is still widely recognized as the vernacular name of the city. The area of Saigon ward then was Bến Nghé ward of District 1, Ho Chi Minh City (except the now-extension part in Đa Kao) and matched with the major of the historic town of Bến Nghé.

=== Establishment ===
During Vietnam's 2025 administrative reorganization at the commune level, the government of Ho Chi Minh City has advocated naming new wards and communes with letters instead of numbers, with considerations from the history of the neighborhood, familiarity, and cultural values. This policy is widely supported by the people.

To implement the above policy, District 1 proposed to name its central ward Saigon for the following reasons:

- "As the historical, political, economic, and cultural center of Ho Chi Minh City, the ward is home to many symbolic architectural works such as the Ho Chi Minh City Hall, Saigon Opera House, Ho Chi Minh City Museum, etc.
- It is home to many important historical sites, with structures such as Ba Son Shipyard (associated with the revolutionary activities of Ho Chi Minh and the workers' movement in the early 20th century) and the U.S. Consulate General (U.S. Embassy before 1975).
- More than 3/4 of the ward's perimeter is bordered by rivers and canals, from the Thị Nghè Canal and Bến Nghé Canal to the Saigon River, which affirms the characteristic river element in the history and culture of this land.
- It is a bustling commercial and financial center, with significant streets such as Nguyễn Huệ, Đồng Khởi, Lê Lợi, Hàm Nghi, Hai Bà Trưng, etc.
- Showing respect for historical values to help preserve local identity in the context of rapid urbanization.
- The name Saigon is easily recognizable and familiar to both residents and international visitors, convenient for promoting the image, promoting the development of tourism, services, and urban economy.
- Saigon is not only a place name, but also a symbol of pride, familiar memories, and responsibility to continue the traditional values of a young city, but rich in heritage that knows how to cherish its roots in the city's development journey."

On June 16, 2025, the National Assembly Standing Committee issued Resolution No. 1685/NQ-UBTVQH15 on the arrangement of commune-level administrative units of Ho Chi Minh City in 2025 (effective from June 16, 2025). Accordingly, the entire land area and population of Bến Nghé ward and parts of Đa Kao ward (quarter 4, 5, 6, 8, 10) and Nguyễn Thái Bình ward (quarter 1) of the former District 1 will be integrated into a new ward named Sài Gòn (Clause 1, Article 1).

== Division ==
Saigon ward is divided into 14 quarters, including Ba Son Quarter and numbered quarters from 1 to 13, with 1 to 8 is part of former Bến Nghé ward, 9 is part of former Nguyễn Thái Bình ward and 10 to 13 is part of former Đa Kao.

== Education ==
=== Schools ===
- April 30 Kindergarten
- Hoa Lư Kindergaten
- Sapa Private Kindergarten
- Hòa Bình Primary School, Branch 2 of the school on Tôn Thất Đạm Street before school year of 1998–1999 was Bến Nghé Primary School
- Vinschool Golden River Private School at Vinhomes Golden River development (Ba Son)
- Asian International School, Primary School at 2Bis Thái Văn Lung
- Võ Trường Toản Secondary School
- Trưng Vương High School
- Trần Đại Nghĩa High School for the Gifted

=== Higher education institutions ===
- Ho Chi Minh City University of Social Sciences and Humanities, Saigon Campus (of VNU-HCM)
- Ho Chi Minh City Medicine and Pharmacy University, School of Pharmacy
- Ho Chi Minh University of Banking
- Saigon University, Campus 2
- Posts and Telecommunications Institute of Technology, Ho Chi Minh City
- Institute of Social Sciences in Ho Chi Minh City
- Institute of Education Management of Ho Chi Minh City
- Cao Thắng Technical College

=== Libraries ===
Some notable libraries located in the ward:

- American Center Ho Chi Minh City – Library of Consulate General of the United States, Ho Chi Minh City at Level 8, Diamond Plaza, 34 Lê Duẩn Boulevard
- The IDECAF Media Library at 31 Thái Văn Lung Street
- Nguyễn An Ninh Digital Library on Nguyễn Văn Bình Street, a digital version of the original same name physics library and specialized for topics of Southern Vietnam
- Library of Social Sciences at Insitiute of Social Sciences in Ho Chi Minh City, 34 Lý Tự Trọng

== Consulates ==
List of Consulate General in Sài Gòn Ward
Nation	Address
United Kingdom	25 Lê Duẩn Boulevard
Netherlands	29 Lê Duẩn Boulevard
Germany	Level 4, Deutsches Haus, 33 Lê Duẩn Boulevard
United States of America	No.4 Lê Duẩn Boulevard
France	No.6 Lê Duẩn Blvd & 27 Nguyễn Thị Minh Khai St.
Norway	Somerset Chancellor Court Ho Chi Minh City, 21 Nguyễn Thị Minh Khai Street
Singapore	Room 5, Level 11, Saigon Centre Tower 2, 67 Lê Lợi Boulevard
Panama	No.7 Lê Thánh Tôn Street
Australia	Level 20, Vincom Center Đồng Khởi, 47 Lý Tự Trọng Street
New Zealand	Suite 804, Level 8, The Metropolitan, 235 Đồng Khởi Street
Canada	Suite 1002, Level 10, The Metropolitan, 235 Đồng Khởi Street
Laos	93 Pasteur Street
Finland	Room 501, Sailing Tower, 111A Pasteur Street
Italy	Level 10, President Place Building, 93 Nguyễn Du
Switzerland	Level 37, Bitexco Financial Tower, No.2 Hải Triều Street
Indonesia	18 Phùng Khắc Khoan Street (formerly in Đa Kao)
Hungary	22 Phùng Khắc Khoan Street (formerly in Đa Kao)

== See also ==
- Ho Chi Minh City
- District 1
