= Đa Kao =

Coordinates: 10°47′N 106°42′E

Đa Kao Đất Hộ, Hòa Mỹ
- Ward
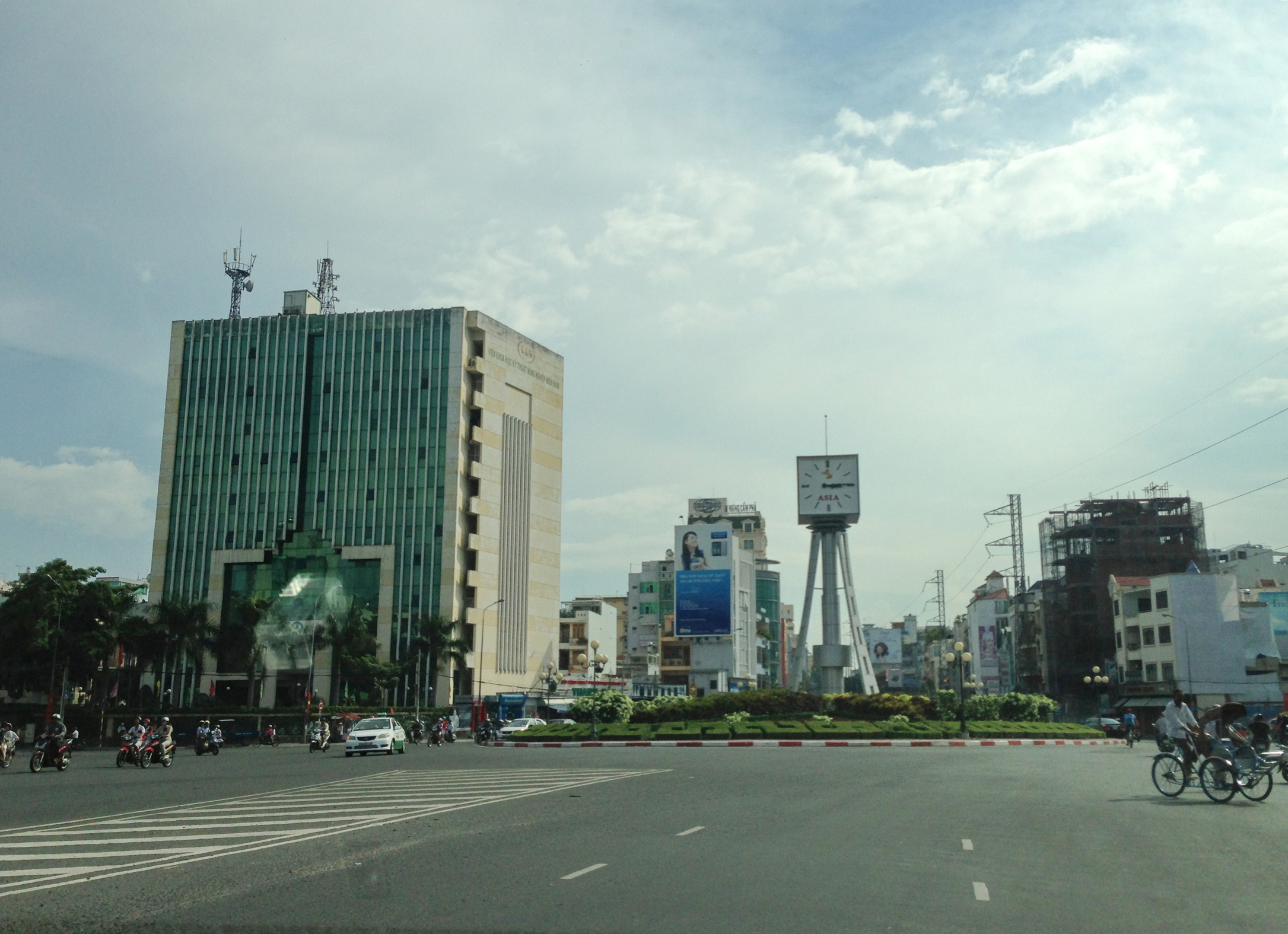
- Đa Kao Roundabout with the BIDV clock tower
- Interactive map of Đa Kao
- Country: Vietnam
- Municipality: Ho Chi Minh City
- District: District 1

Population
  - Total: 21,579
  - Density: 56,450/sq mi (21,797/km^{2})
- Time zone: UTC+07:00 (Indochina Time)

Đa Kao is an area in the southside of Tân Định ward, it plays a role as administrative centre also a part of the city historic central business district along with some nearby ward. It was a ward (phường) of District 1 in Ho Chi Minh City, Vietnam, but was dissolved following Vietnam's 2025 administrative reforms since July 2025.

== Geography ==
Đa Kao Ward located in the north of District 1, borders to:

- Bến Nghé ward to the east by Nguyễn Thị Minh Khai Street
- Tân Định ward to the west by streets of Võ Thị Sáu and Đinh Tiên Hoàng (stretch leading to Bông Bridge)
- Võ Thị Sáu ward, District 3 to the south by Hai Bà Trưng Street
- Ward 1, 2 and 17, Bình Thạnh District to the north by Nhiêu Lộc – Thị Nghè Channel.

The ward had an area of 0,99 km^{2}, with the total population is 21.579 people, and population density is 21.467 person/km^{2}, in 2023.

== History ==
The Đa Kao area was originally called by a Vietnamese name that has meaning as Đất Hộ (quartier land or land managed by quartier). Quartier (Hộ) was an administrative unit that existed during the period when the cities of Saigon (changed from Bến Nghé) and Chợ Lớn were merged into the Saigon – Cholon region (Région de Saigon – Cholon; Vùng Sài Gòn – Chợ Lớn) during the French colonial period; this unit was equivalent to the canton level in the provinces. The head of a quartier was called Chief of quartier (Chef de quartier; Hộ trưởng). Đất Hộ was transcribed as Dakao (or Đa Kao) in books, newspapers, and documents during the French colonial period. The name Đa Kao became widely popular in Saigon from the 1950s onwards.

At the beginning of the Nguyễn Dynasty, the current Đa Kao ward area was roughly equivalent to Hoà Mỹ hamlet (thôn), Bình Trị commune, Bình Dương district, Tân Bình fu (or prefecture), Phiên An province (later changed as Gia Định). In the 6th year of Gia Long, the Phiên An province headquarters was located in this village, before moving to Quy citadel (the first, biggest and most iconic edition of the Citadel of Gia Định) under the Minh Mạng Dynasty. By the 1860s, when the French planned the City of Saigon, Hoà Mỹ hamlet was changed as a village and was still on the outskirts of the city. In 1881, Hoà Mỹ village was divided into two villages, Hội An and Tân An, but a year later it was merged back into the old one. In 1888, Hoà Mỹ village was officially incorporated into the City of Saigon and divided into quartiers. Currently, in Đa Kao ward, there is a street named Hoà Mỹ and an eponymous temple on the street, also there is a temple named as Tân An, one of the two village split from Hòa Mỹ, on the corner of Nguyễn Bỉnh Khiêm – Nguyễn Văn Thủ (opposite the Tax Branch of District 1).

During the Republic of Vietnam, Đa Kao ward corresponded to Tự Đức ward, District 1, City of Saigon. The ward was named after Tự Đức street, which was named after The Emperor Tự Đức, in the ward at that time (now is Nguyễn Văn Thủ street).

In 1976, Tự Đức ward was dissolved and divided into 3 wards: Ward 5, Ward 6 and Ward 7.

On August 26, 1982, the Council of Ministers issued Decision No.147-HĐBT. Accordingly, Ward 5 was dissolved, and its area was merged into Ward 6 and Ward 7.

On December 21, 1988, the Council of Ministers issued Decision No.184-HĐBT. Accordingly, the entire area and population of Ward 6 and Ward 7 were merged to form Đa Kao.

In July 2025, following Vietnam's 2025 administrative reforms, Đa Kao ward was dissolved into two parts by the Nguyễn Đình Chiểu Street, the part northwest side of the street also most of the former ward was merged into Tân Định ward, the rest was merged into Bến Nghé ward with part of Nguyễn Thái Bình ward to established the Saigon ward.

== Gallery with some notable landmarks ==
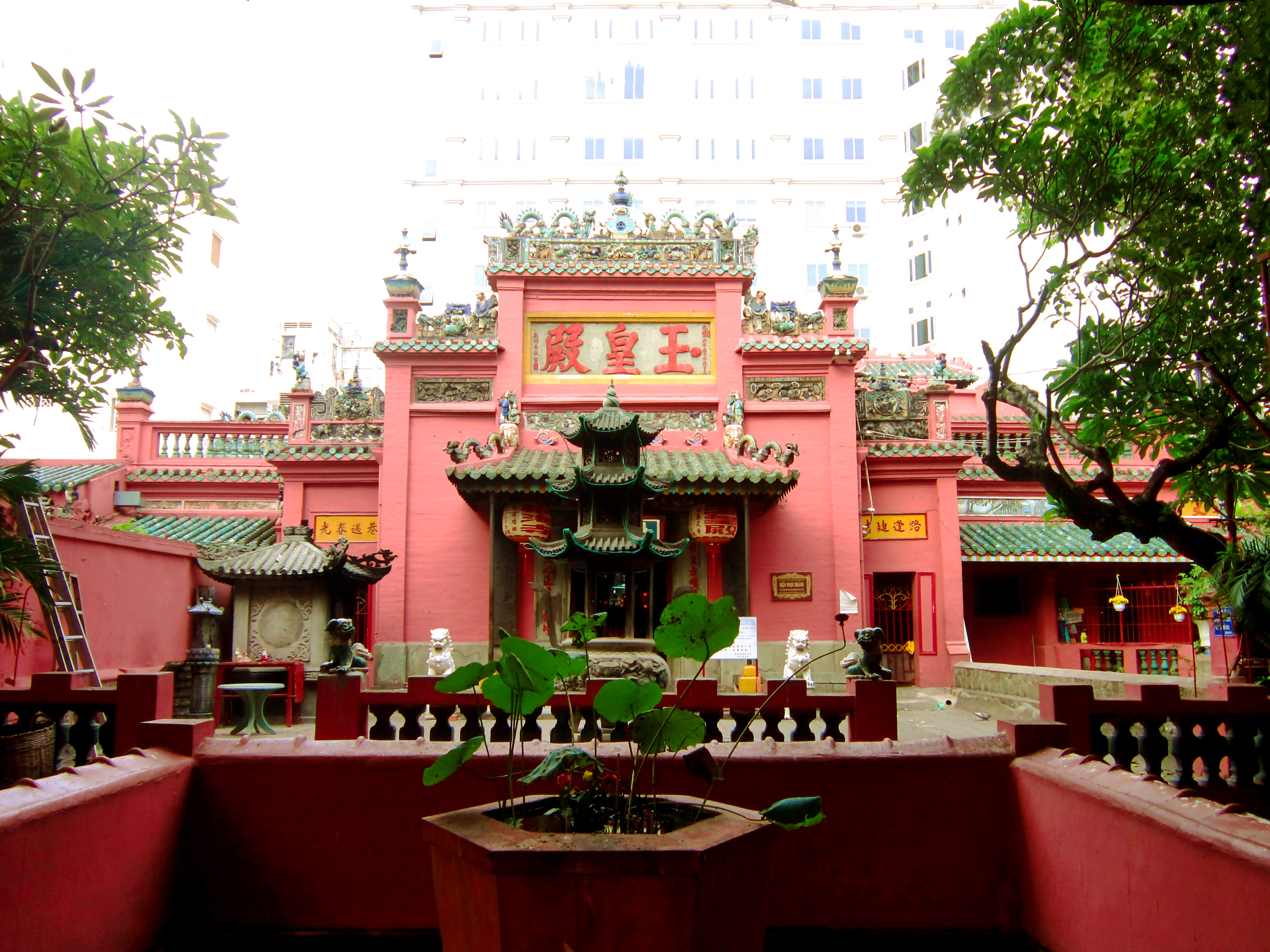
Jade Emperor Pagoda (Ngọc Hoàng Temple or Phước Hải Tự)

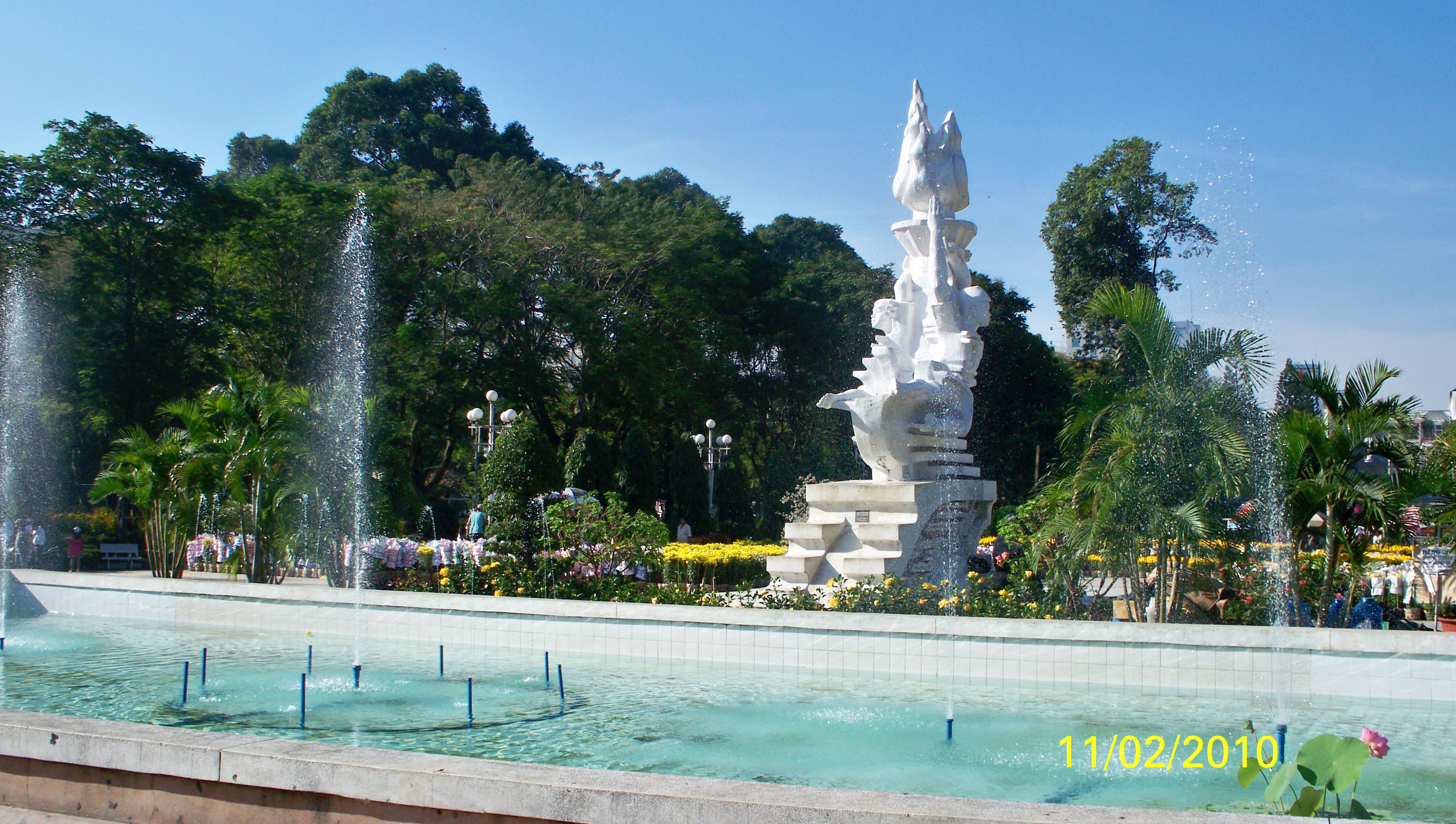
Lê Văn Tám Park

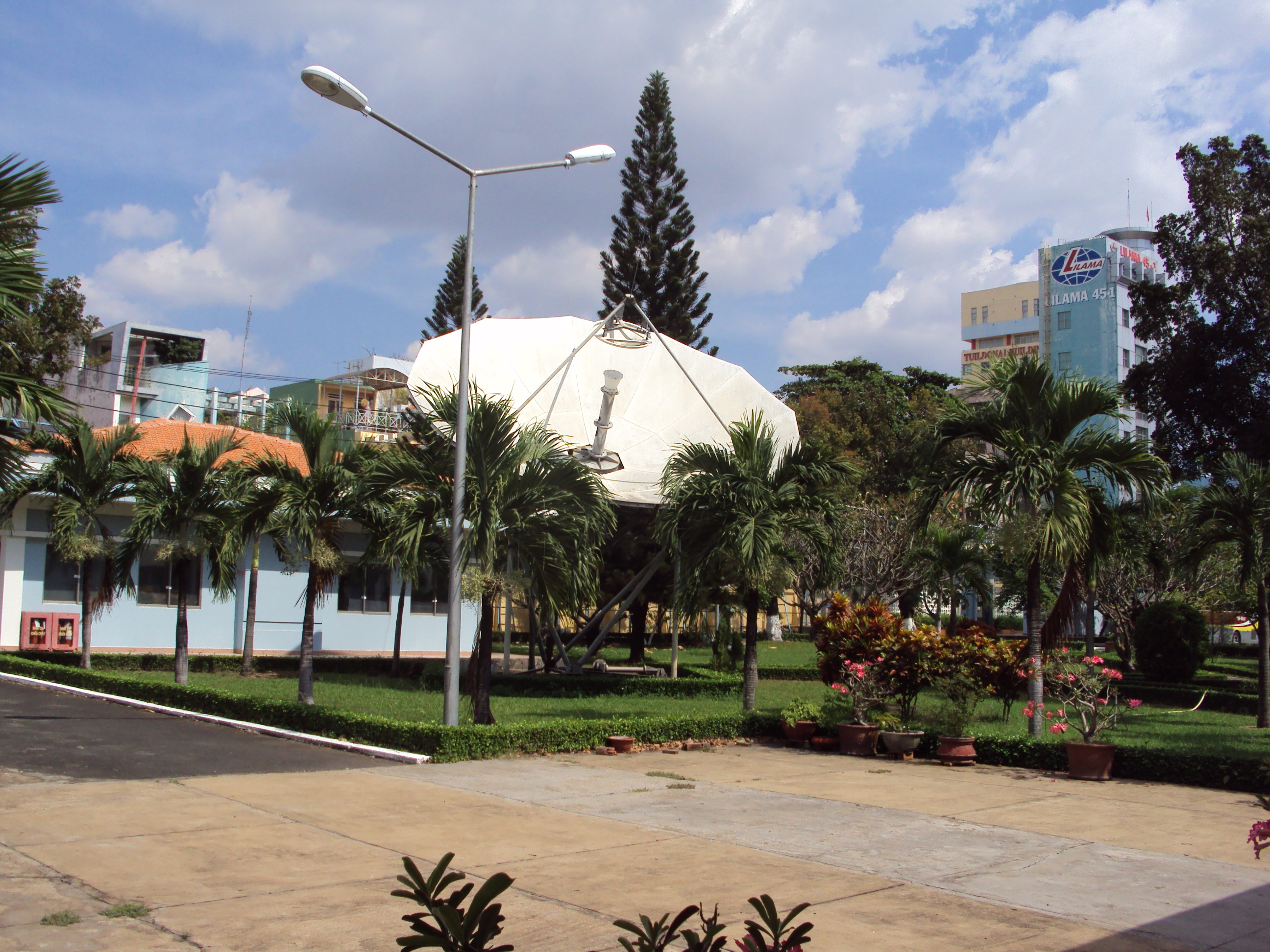
International Telecom Center 2 (Lotus Station) behind Lê Văn Tám Park

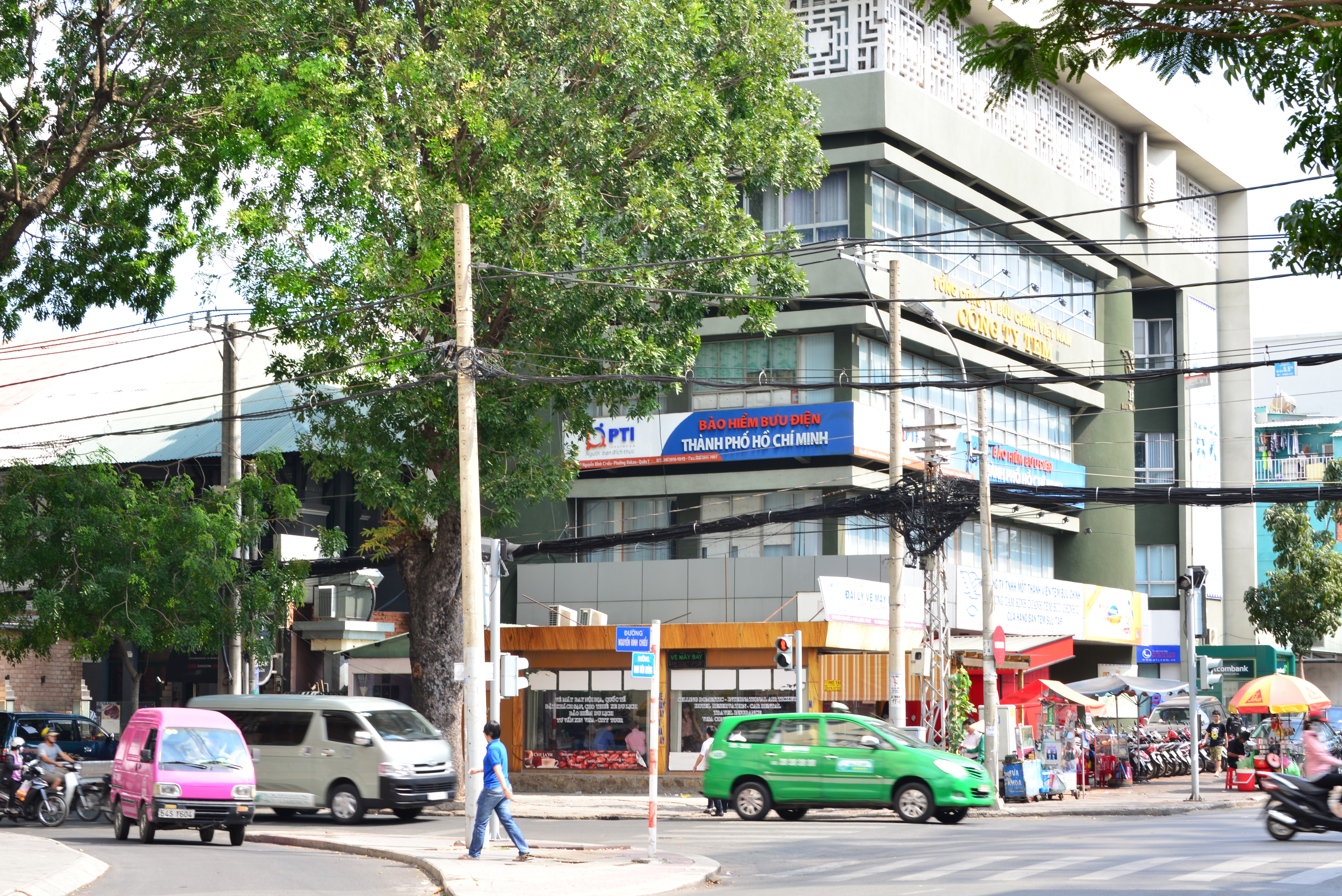
TEM Building of Vietnam Stamp Company on the corner streets of Đinh Tiên Hoàng – Nguyễn Đình Chiểu

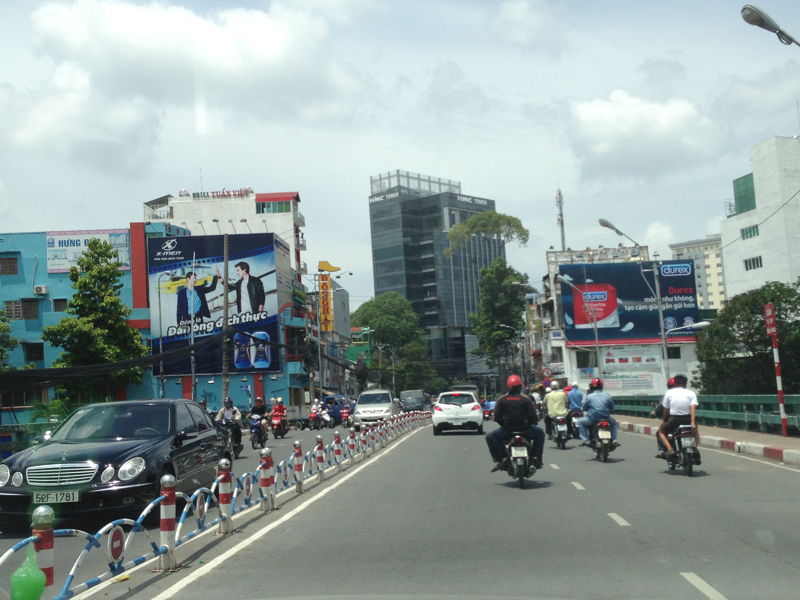
Bông Bridge and HMC Tower on Đinh Tiên Hoàng Street

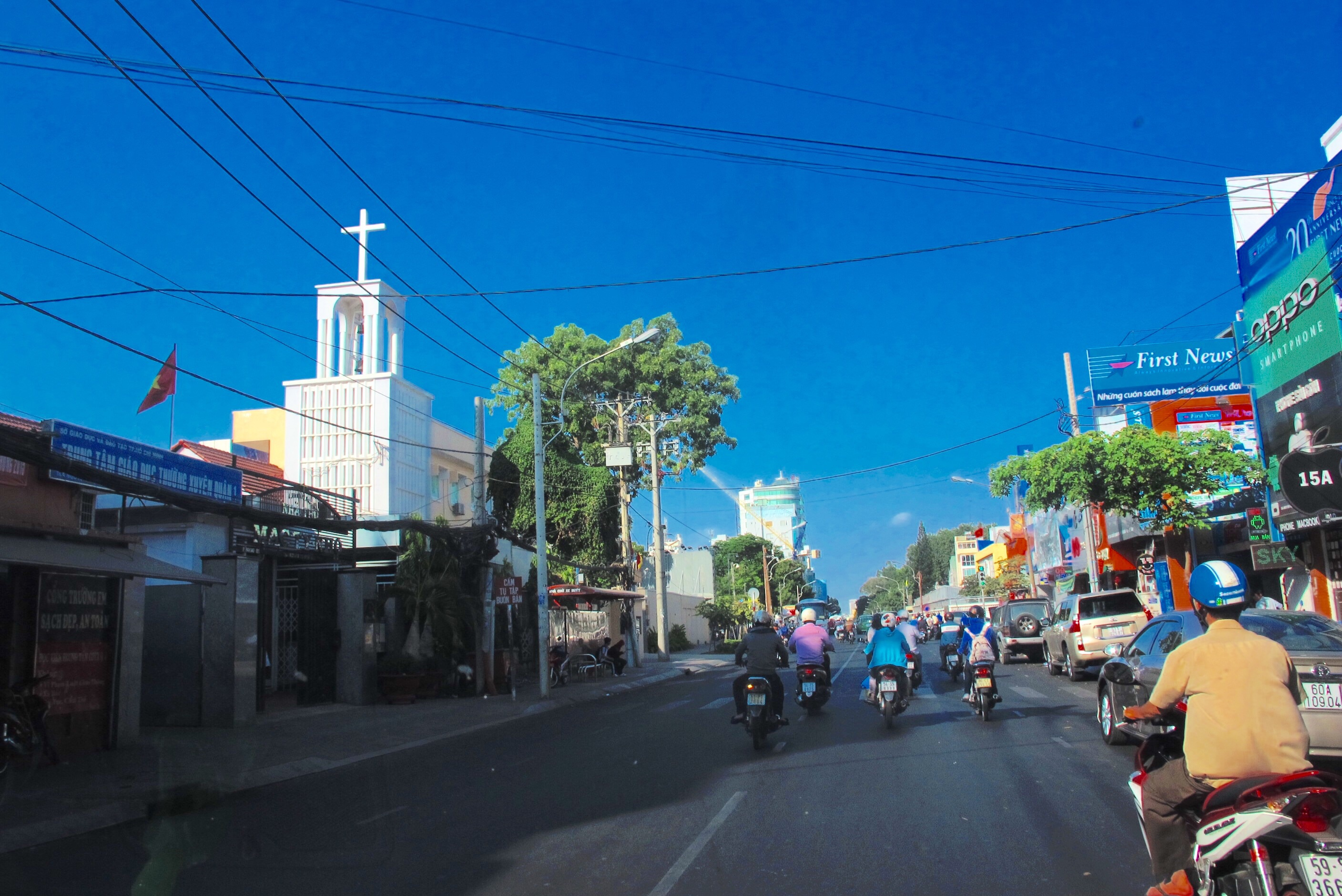
Martin de Tours Parish Church on Nguyễn Thị Minh Khai Street looking towards Thị Nghè Bridge and surrounding buildings

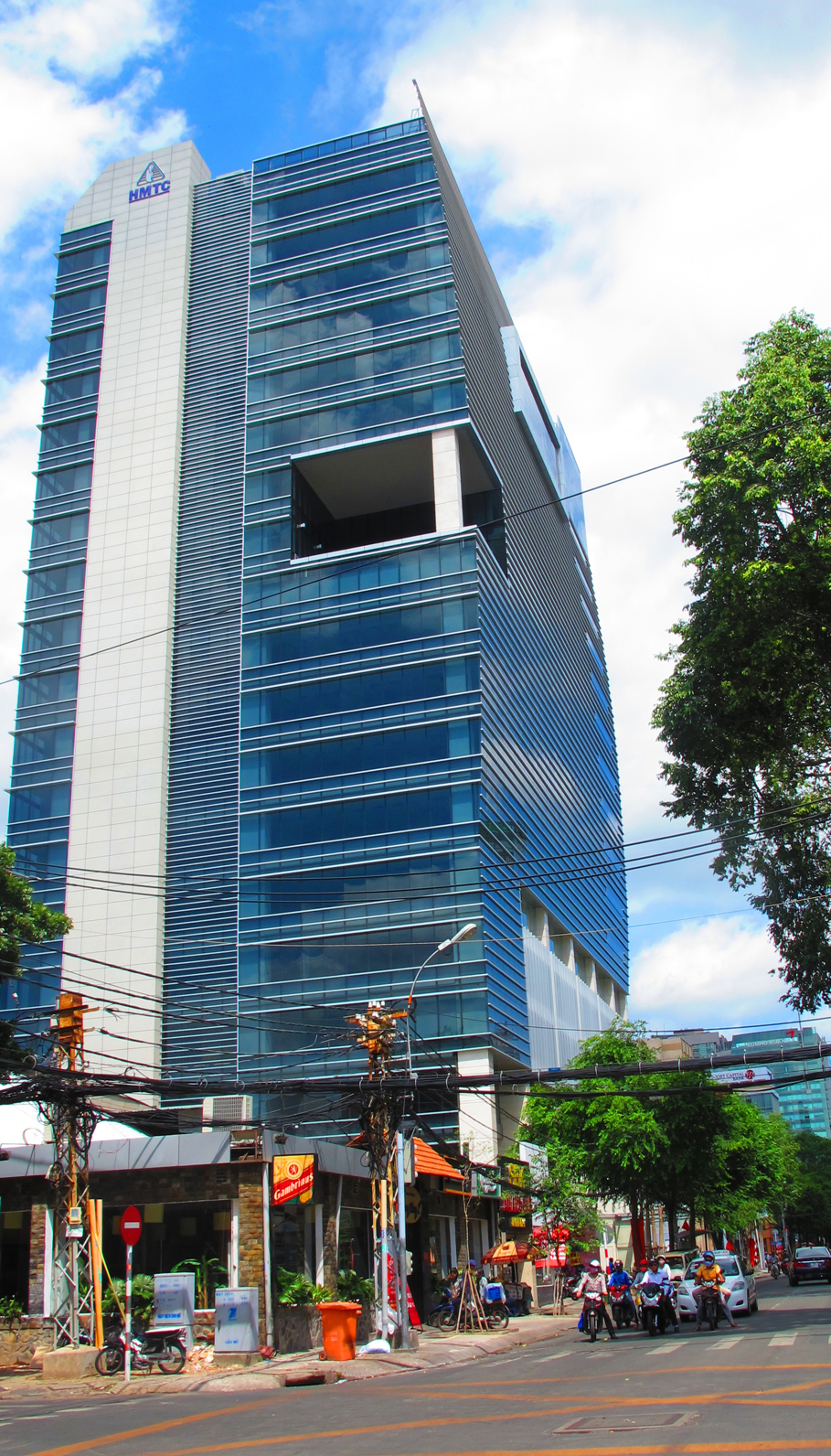
Empress Tower on Hai Bà Trưng Street

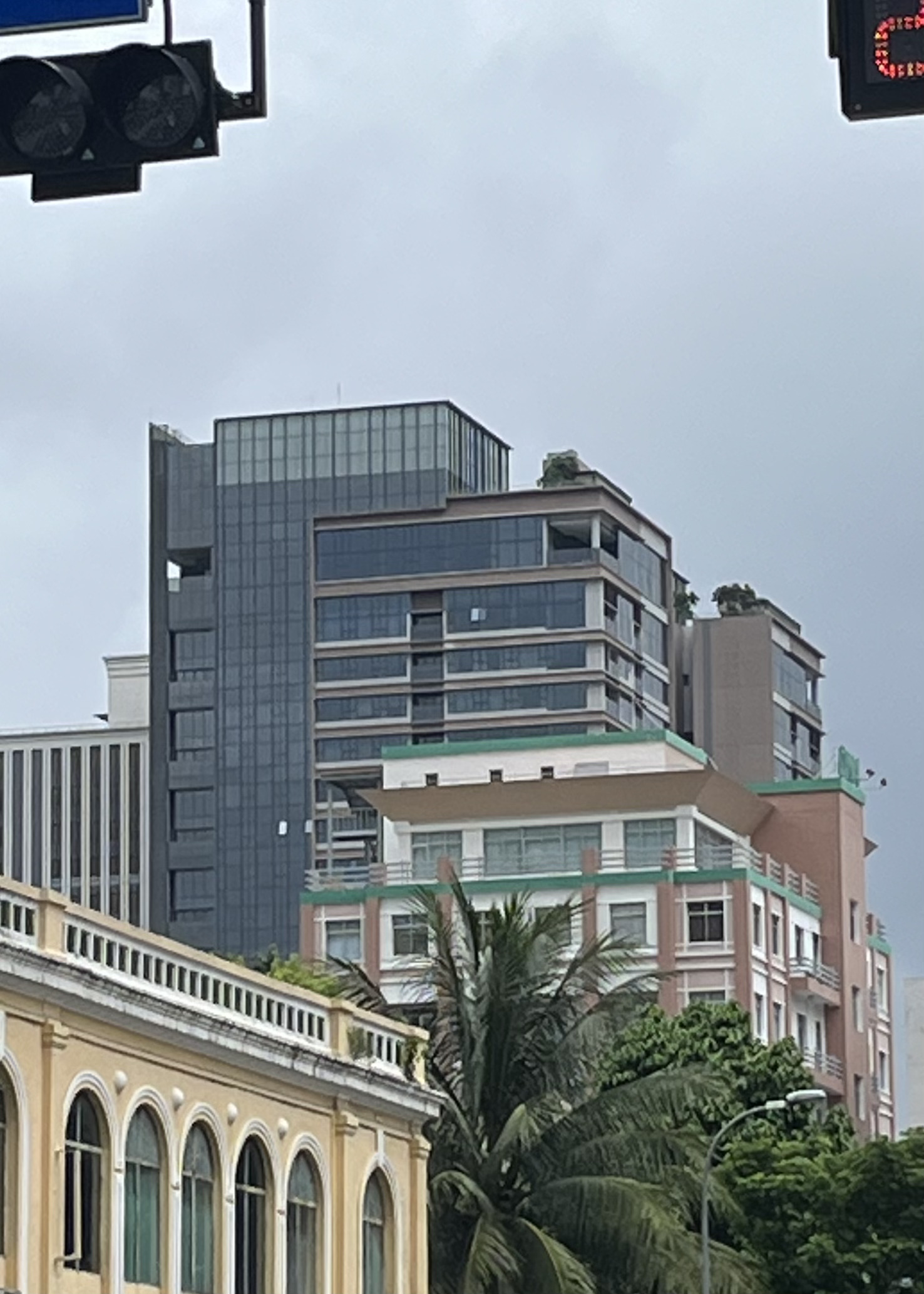
The MarQ Apartment and LIM Tower 3 (grey, left) with School of Management for Agriculture and Rural Development II (DMA) and glimpse of School of Medicine, University of Medicine and Pharmacy at Ho Chi Minh City
