= District 1, Ho Chi Minh City =

District 1 Quận 1
- Urban district
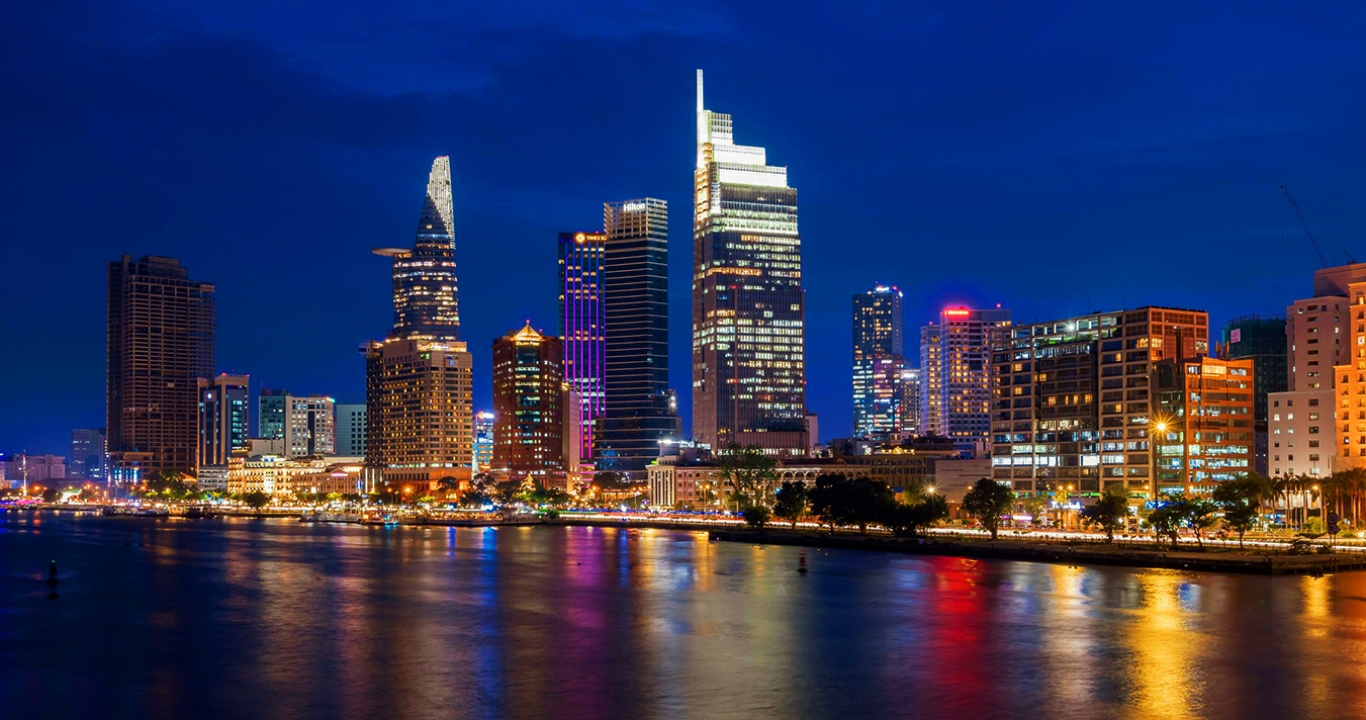
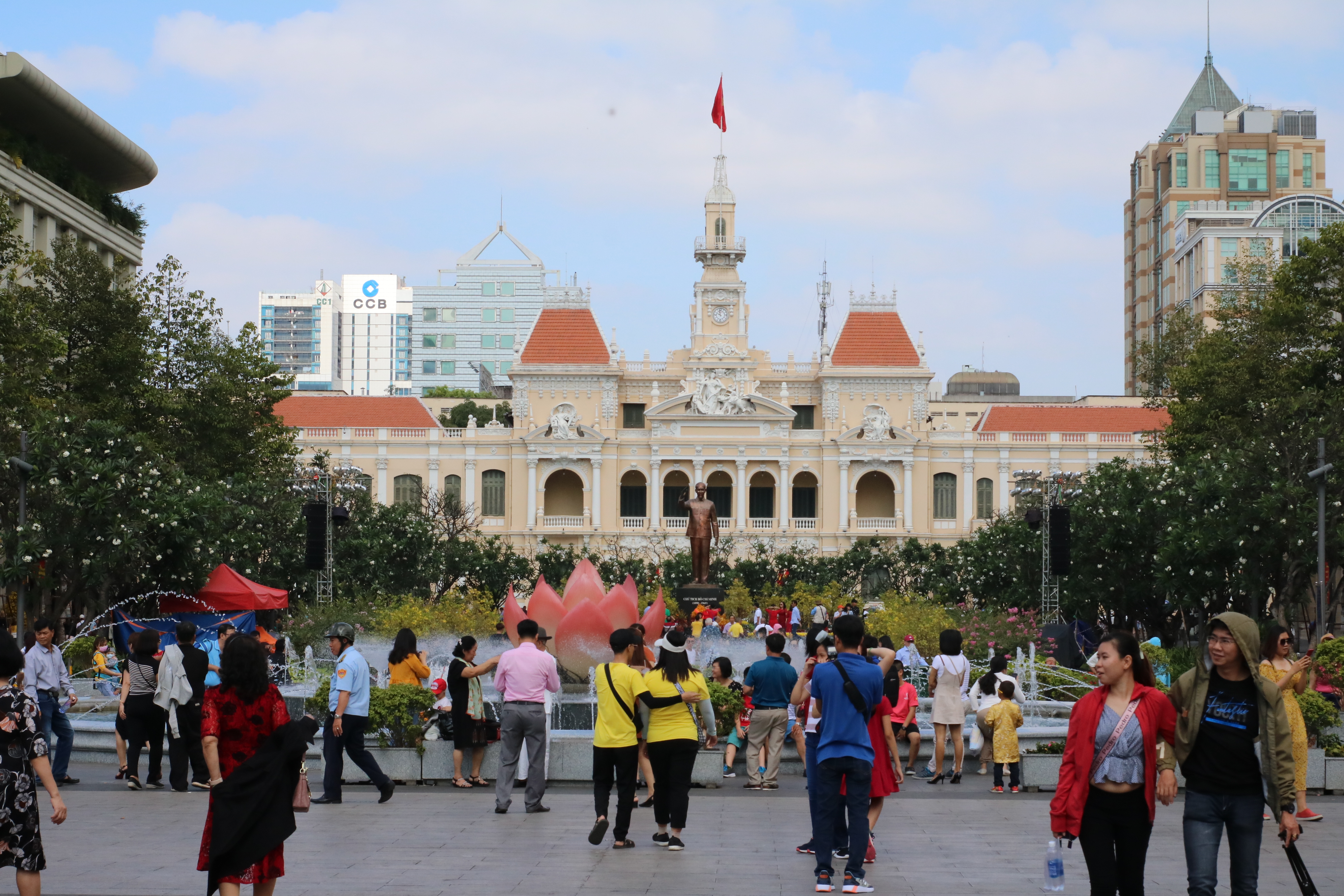
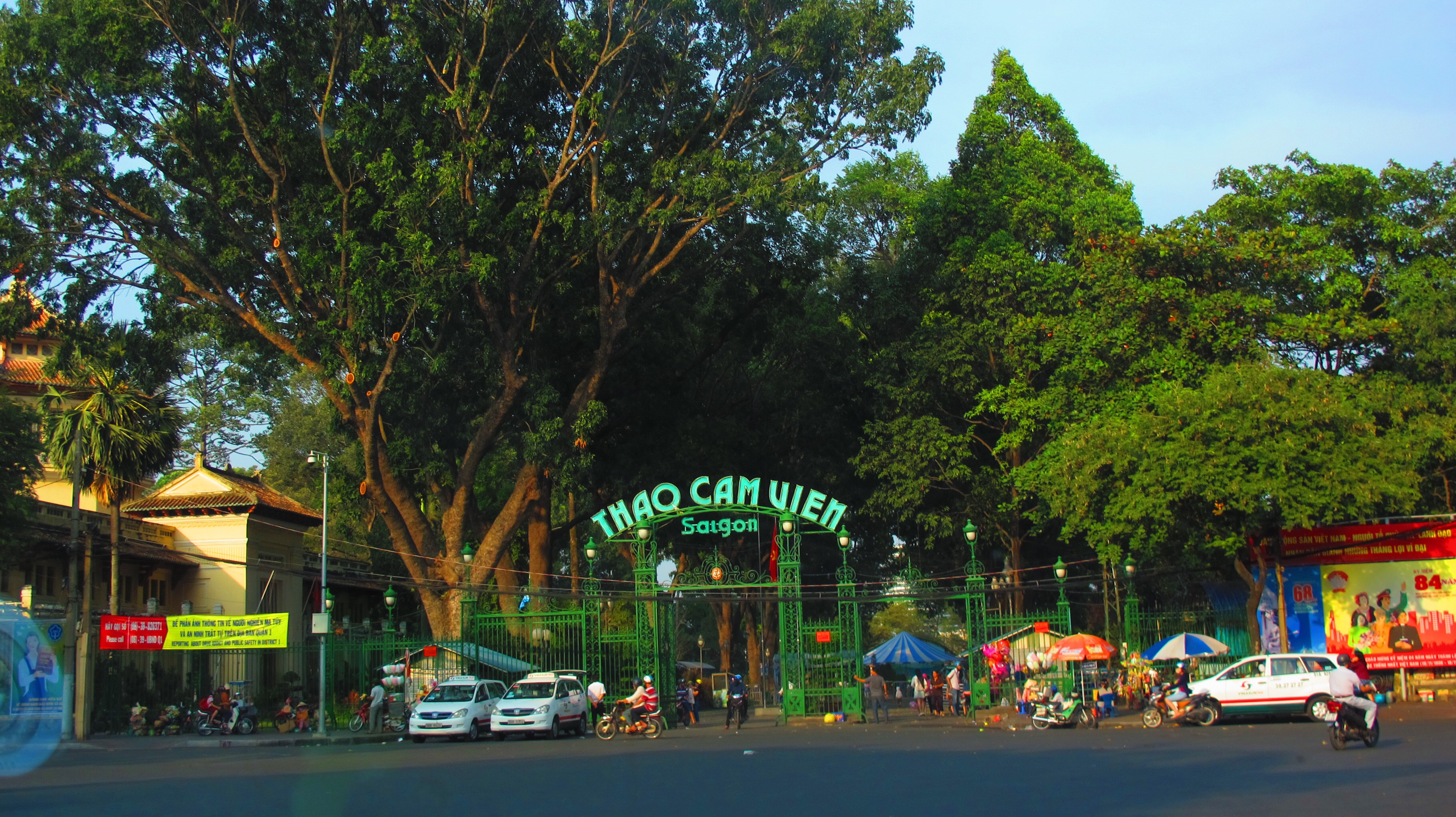
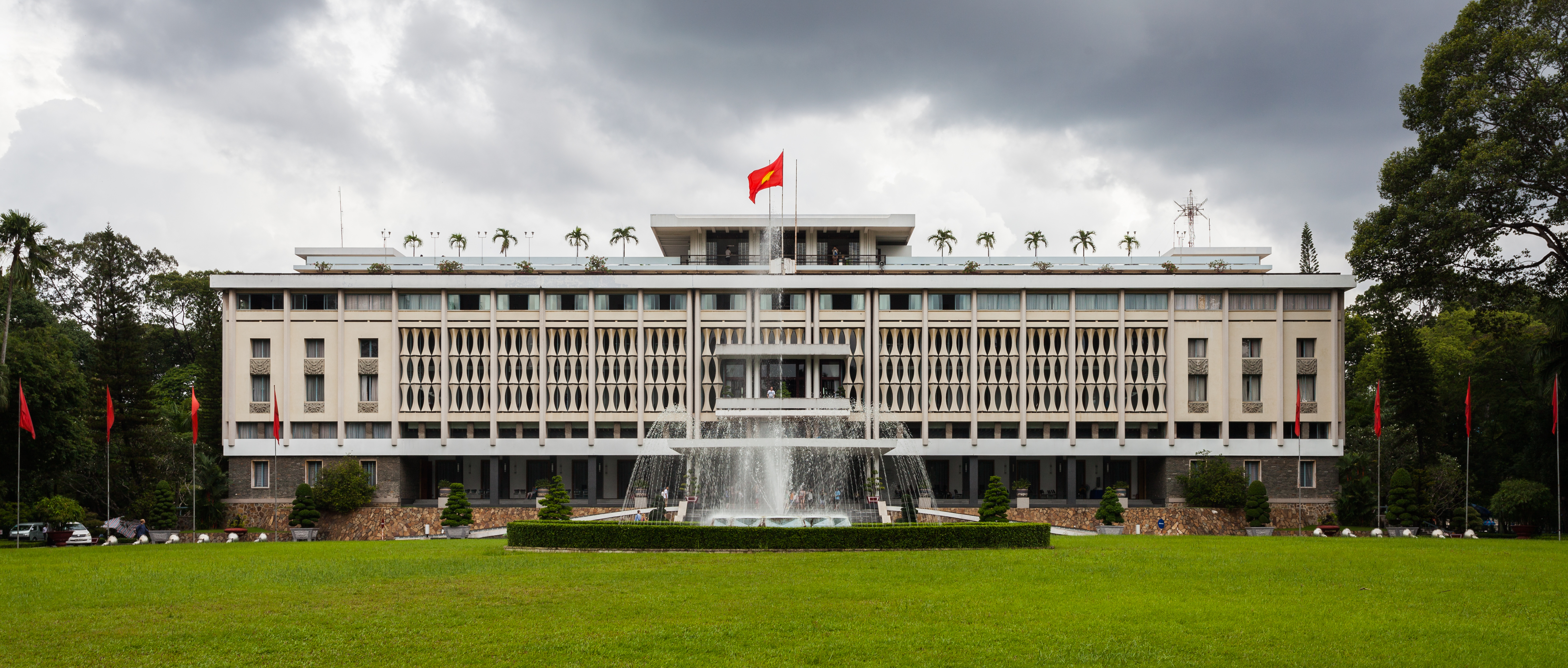
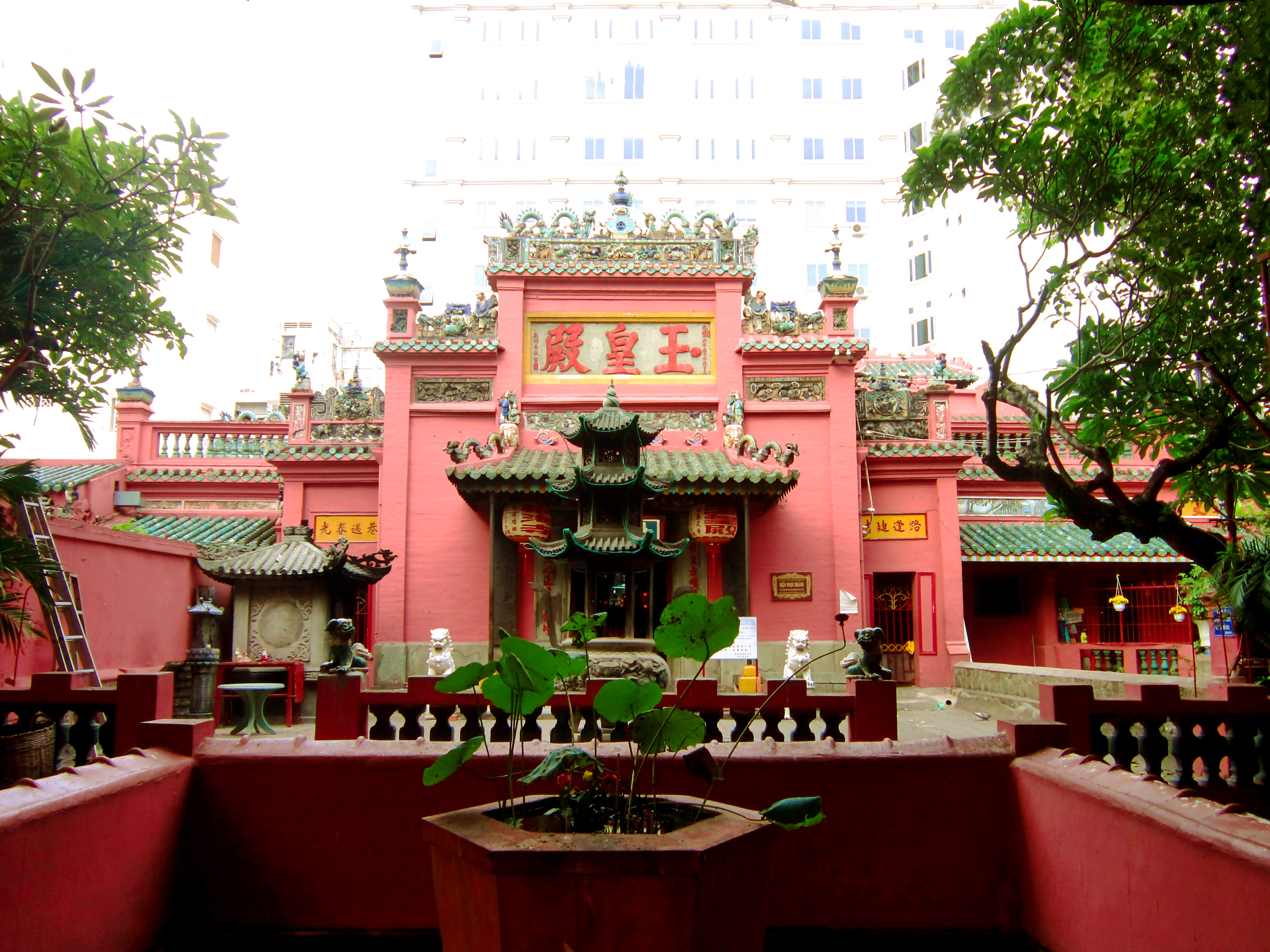
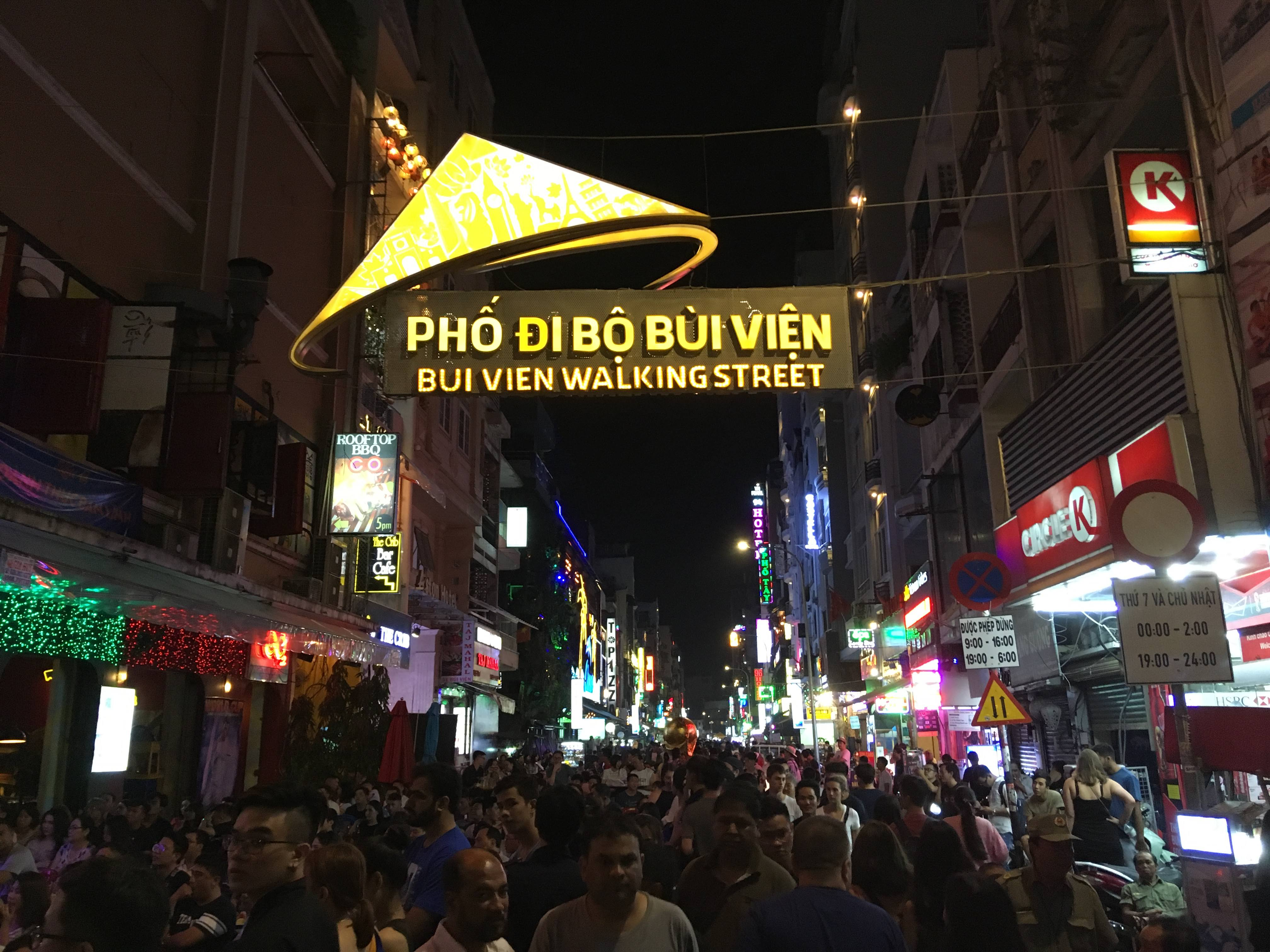
- Clockwise from top: Bạch Đằng Quay skyline at night viewed from Ba Son Bridge, Nguyễn Huệ Boulevard with Ho Chi Minh City Hall and Ho Chi Minh waving statue in the middle, Saigon Zoo and Botanical Gardens, Independence Palace, Ngọc Hoàng Temple, Bùi Viện Street - Backpacker quarter

- Seal

- Position in HCMC's core

- Location within Vietnam
- Coordinates: 10°46′32″N 106°41′49″E
- Country: Vietnam
- Centrally governed city: Ho Chi Minh City
- Seat: 47 Lê Duẩn Boulevard
- Wards: 10 phường

Area
  - Total: 7.72 km^{2} (2.98 sq mi)

Population (2018)
  - Total: 205,180
  - Density: 26,600/km^{2} (68,800/sq mi)

Demographics
  - Main ethnic groups: predominantly Kinh
- Time zone: UTC+07 (ICT)
- Website: quan1.hochiminhcity.gov.vn

District 1 (Quận 1, Quận Một, Quận Nhất or Quận Nhứt) was the central urban district of Ho Chi Minh City, the largest city in Vietnam. With a total area of 7.7211 km^{2} (2.9811 sq mi) the district had a population of 204,899 people in 2010. It is the historical birthplace of the city, where the Citadel of Gia Định is first built. The district was divided into 10 small subsets which were called wards (phường) prior to the 2025 administrative reforms.

Although it has been dissolved, "District 1" is still colloquially referred for the city's central business district, an area including several central wards in the city that was part of the district, it contained most of the city's administrative offices, consulates, and iconic buildings. District 1 was the busiest district in the city with the highest living standards with Nguyễn Huệ Boulevard and Đồng Khởi Street, the city's two main shopping streets, the latter is the highest demand area for real estate in the city and the whole nation, hitting a record price of $50,000 per square meter in 2007 and topping the charts of most expensive streets in the nation for years.

== History ==
District 1 and the other seven districts of Ho Chi Minh City were founded on May 27, 1959. Before 1975, District 1 was divided into 2 different districts and divided by Công Lý Street (it is Nam Kỳ Khởi Nghĩa Street nowadays and it is the borderline of two central wards of the city are Saigon and Bến Thành), the first district on the east side of the street only had four small subsets (wards) which were Bến Nghé, Hòa Bình, Trần Quang Khải (now is known as the northern part of Tân Định) and Tự Đức (later known as Đa Kao of District 1 then now is the southern part of Tân Định; both latter are named after major historical characters), and the second district had seven different wards which were Bến Thành, Huyện Sĩ (later merged into Bến Thành), Bùi Viện (later known as Phạm Ngũ Lão, District 1 and now is part of Bến Thành), Cầu Ông Lãnh, Cầu Kho, Nguyễn Cảnh Chân (later merged into Cầu Kho) and Nguyễn Cư Trinh (all now are part of Cầu Ông Lãnh since July 2025). In May 1976 the first and second districts were combined into District 1. On 1 July 2025, the districts of Ho Chi Minh City were abolished, and District 1 central area which are former Bến Nghé ward with part of Nguyễn Thái Bình and Đa Kao since corresponds to the Saigon ward.

== Administration ==
District 1 was subdivided into ten wards, namely Bến Nghé, Bến Thành, Cô Giang, Cầu Kho, Cầu Ông Lãnh, Đa Kao, Nguyễn Thái Bình, Nguyễn Cư Trinh, Phạm Ngũ Lão and Tân Định. Each ward had its own People's Committee, subordinate to the People's Committee of District 1.

== Demographic and geographical features ==
District 1 had a population of 204,899 people over the total of 7,162,864 in Ho Chi Minh City. The total area of the district was 7.7211 km^{2} (2.9811 sq mi). The district's density was 26,538 inhabitants per square kilometre (68,730/sq mi), very high compared to Ho Chi Minh City (3,419/km^{2} (8,860/sq mi)) and Vietnam (259/km^{2} (670/sq mi)) respectively.

District 1 was located towards the center of Ho Chi Minh City.

== Economy ==
When Saigon was governed by South Vietnam, Air Vietnam's head office was located in District 1.

District 1 is considered the financial center of Saigon and Vietnam. It is home to the Ho Chi Minh City Stock Exchange, State Bank of Vietnam (Ho Chi Minh City branch), and Vietnamese headquarters of international banks such as HSBC, ANZ (sold retail business in Vietnam to Shinhan, currently located at Thủ Thiêm), United Overseas Bank, Standard Chartered, Citi, JPMorgan Chase, Bank of China, and Maybank. District 1 also known as the best spot for shopping in Vietnam, with a high concentration of shopping centres and luxury brand stores, such as: Rex Arcade, Saigon Centre Mall (featuring Takashimaya), Vincom Center Đồng Khởi, Union Square Saigon, Lotte Department Store – Diamond Plaza and Now Zone Fashion Mall.

District 1 was effectively shutdown for tourism during the COVID-19 pandemic in Vietnam, causing many restaurants, bars, clubs, and hotels, to suffer major financial distress.

== Consulates ==
Ho Chi Minh City is Vietnam's biggest and busiest city, with a large population of immigrants from around the world living and working there. As District 1 is the city's central district, many foreign general consulates are located there.

The Consulate of Australia	Level 20, Vincom Center 47 Lý Tự Trọng, Bến Nghé Ward, District 1, Ho Chi Minh City
The Consulate of Cambodia	41 Phùng Khắc Khoan, Đa Kao Ward, District 1, Ho Chi Minh City
The Consulate of Canada	Suite 1002, Level 10, The Metropolitan, 235 Đồng Khởi, Bến Nghé Ward, District 1, Ho Chi Minh City
The Consulate of China	175 Hai Bà Trưng, Võ Thị Sáu Ward, District 3, (Note: Hai Ba Trung Street is the boundary between District 1 and District 3.) Ho Chi Minh City
The Consulate of Cuba	45 Phùng khắc Khoan, Đa Kao Ward, District 1, Ho Chi Minh City
The Consulate of the Czech Republic	28 Nguyễn Thị Minh Khai, Bến Nghé Ward, District 1, Ho Chi Minh City
The Consulate of France	27 Nguyễn Thị Minh Khai, Bến Nghé Ward, District 1, Ho Chi Minh City
The Consulate of Germany	Level 4, Deutsches Haus, 33 Lê Duẩn, Bến Nghé Ward, Disitrct 1, Ho Chi Minh City
The Consulate of Hungary	22 Phùng Khắc Khoan, Đa Kao Ward, District 1, Ho Chi Minh City
The Consulate of Indonesia	18 Phùng Khắc Khoan, Đa Kao Ward, District 1, Ho Chi Minh City
The Consulate of Italy	17 Lê Duẩn Ward, Bến Nghé, District 1, Ho Chi Minh City
The Consulate of Laos	93 Pasteur, Bến Nghé Ward, District 1, Ho Chi Minh City
The Consulate of Malaysia	2 Ngô Đức Kế, Bến Nghé Ward, District 1, Ho Chi Minh City
The Consulate of New Zealand	Suite 804, Level 8, The Metropolitan, 235 Đồng Khởi Street, Bến Nghé Ward, District 1, Ho Chi Minh City
The Consulate of Japan	261 Điện Biên Phủ, Võ Thị Sáu Ward, District 3, Ho Chi Minh City
The Consulate of Panama	7A Lê Thánh Tôn, Bến Nghé Ward, District 1, Ho Chi Minh City
The Consulate of Poland	2 Trần Cao Vân, Đa Kao Ward, District 1, Ho Chi Minh City
The Consulate of Singapore	Room 5-Level 11, Saigon Centre Tower 2, 67 Lê Lợi, Bến Nghé Ward, District 1, Ho Chi Minh City
The Consulate of South Korea	107 Nguyễn Du, Bến Nghé Ward, District 1, Ho Chi Minh City
The Consulate of Sweden	8A/11 D1 Lầu 5 Thái Văn Lung, Bến Nghé Ward, District 1, Ho Chi Minh City
The Consulate of Switzerland	2 Ngô Đức Kế, Bến Nghé Ward, District 1, Ho Chi Minh City
The Consulate of the United Kingdom	25 Lê Duẩn, Bến Nghé Ward, District 1, Ho Chi Minh City
The Consulate of the United States of America	4 Lê Duẩn, Bến Nghé Ward, District 1, Ho Chi Minh City

== Education ==
Many of the public schools in the city are located in District 1. Vietnam's system of private schools is relatively new and is still in the developing stage.

=== Kindergarten ===
Name	Address	Notes
20/10	85A Nguyễn Trãi	
30/4	174-176 Pasteur	
Baby	31A Lý Tự Trọng	
Bến Thành	87 Sương Nguyệt Anh	
Asia-Pacific	26/6 Nguyễn Bĩnh Khiêm	
Bé Ngoan	108 Nguyễn Đình Chiểu	
Cô Giang	50 Hồ Hảo Hớn	
Hoa Lan	541 Trần Hưng Đạo	
Hoa Lư	1 Nguyễn Bỉnh Khiêm	
Nguyễn Cư Trinh	122 Trần Đình Xu	
Nguyễn Thái Bình	121-123 Ng Thái Bình	
Nemo	14V Nguyễn Đình Chiểu	
Panda	18 Phan Kế Bính	
Phạm Ngũ Lão	329 Phạm Ngũ Lão	
Hoa Quỳnh	34 Nguyễn Phi Khanh	
Lê Thị Riêng	39 Nguyễn Đình Chiểu	
Sân Lá Cọ - Stamford Grammar	4Bis Phùng Khắc Khoan	
Tân Định	26 Đặng Dung	
Tuổi Hồng	21 Yersin	
Tuổi Thơ	97 Nguyễn Du	
Chuyên biệt Tương Lai	27A Trần Nhật Duật	International citizens
Dân lập Mạnh Mẫu	96 Thạch Thị Thanh	International citizens
Ngôi nhà nhỏ	16 Phan Liêm	International citizens
Sapa	1 Nguyễn Hữu Cảnh	International citizens

=== Primary School ===
Name	Address	Notes
Chương Dương Primary School	494 Võ Văn Kiệt Street, Cầu Kho, District 1, Ho Chi Minh City	
Đinh Tiên Hoàng Primary School	67 Đinh Tiên Hoàng Street, Đa Kao, District 1, Ho Chi Minh City	
Đuốc Sống Primary School	Campus 1: 2 Đinh Công Tráng Street, Tân Định, District 1, Ho Chi Minh City Campus 2: 96 Thạch Thị Thanh Street, Tân Định, District 1, Ho Chi Minh City	
Hoà Bình Primary School	No.1 Commune Paris Square, Bến Nghé, District 1, Ho Chi Minh City	
Kết Đoàn Primary School	2B Lương Hữu Khánh Street, Phạm Ngũ Lão, District 1, Ho Chi Minh City	
Khai Minh Primary School	44 Phó Đức Chính Street, Nguyễn Thái Bình, District 1, Ho Chi Minh City	
Lê Ngọc Hân Primary School	12 Sương Nguyệt Anh Street, Phạm Ngũ Lão, District 1, Ho Chi Minh City	
Lương Thế Vinh Primary School	116 Cô Giang Street, Cô Giang, District 1, Ho Chi Minh City	
Nguyễn Bỉnh Khiêm Primary School	2 Bis Nguyễn Bỉnh Khiêm Street, Bến Nghé, District 1, Ho Chi Minh City	
Nguyễn Huệ Primary School	93-95A Lê Thị Riêng Street, Bến Thành, District 1, Ho Chi Minh City	
Nguyễn Thái Bình Primary School	105 Nguyễn Thái Bình Street, Nguyễn Thái Bình, District 1, Ho Chi Minh City	
Nguyễn Thái Học Primary School	71 Trần Hưng Đạo Street, Cầu Ông Lãnh, District 1, Ho Chi Minh City	
Phan Văn Trị Primary School	43 Phạm Viết Chánh Street, Nguyễn Cư Trinh, District 1, Ho Chi Minh City	
Trần Hưng Đạo Primary School	81 Trần Đình Xu Street, Nguyễn Cư Trinh, District 1, Ho Chi Minh City	
Trần Khánh Dư Primary School	181 Hoàng Sa Street, Tân Định, District 1, Ho Chi Minh City	
Trần Quang Khải Primary School	Campus 1: 68/29B Trần Quang Khải Street, Tân Định, District 1, Ho Chi Minh City Campus 2: 60 Võ Thị Sáu Street, Tân Định, District 1, Ho Chi Minh City	
The Asian International School	41/3- 41/4 Bis Trần Nhật Duật Street, Tân Định, District 1, Ho Chi Minh City	

=== High school ===
Name	Established	Address	School type	Website
Trần Đại Nghĩa High School for the Gifted (formerly La San Taberd Institute, Ho Chi Minh City Pedagogical School and Ho Chi Minh City Primary School of Pedagogy (as Campus 2) - Central Pedagogy College Ho Chi Minh City)	1874 - 1976 (La San Taberd Institute) 1976 - 2000 (Ho Chi Minh City Pedagogical School and Ho Chi Minh City Primary School of Pedagogy (as Campus 2) - Central Pedagogy College Ho Chi Minh City) 2000 - Now	Campus 1: Gate 1: 20 Lý Tự Trọng street, Bến Nghé Ward, District 1, Ho Chi Minh City. Gate 2: 53 Nguyễn Du street, Bến Nghé Ward, District 1, Ho Chi Minh City. Campus 2: 2/6A Lương Định Của street, An Khánh Ward, Thủ Đức, Ho Chi Minh City.	Public, High school, Secondary school, Gifted education, co-ed	Homepage
Bùi Thị Xuân High School (formerly Nguyễn Bá Tòng School)	1956 - 1978 (Nguyễn Bá Tòng School) 1978 - Now	73-75 Bùi Thị Xuân street, Phạm Ngũ Lão Ward, District 1, Ho Chi Minh City.	Public, High school, co-ed	Homepage
Lương Thế Vinh High School	2004 - Now	131 Cô Bắc street, Cô Giang Ward, District 1, Ho Chi Minh City.	Public, High school, Secondary school, co-ed	Homepage
Trưng Vương High School (formerly Trưng Vương Sài Gòn High School for Women)	1954 - 1975 (Trưng Vương Sài Gòn High School for Women) 1975 - Now	3A Nguyễn Bỉnh Khiêm street, Bến Nghé Ward, District 1, Ho Chi Minh City.	Public, High school, co-ed	Homepage
Ernst Thälmann High School (formerly Chợ Đũi kindergarten for Local Girls, Tôn Thọ Tường Primary School for Girls, Phan Văn Trị Primary School, Cô Giang Secondary School)	1931 - 1950 (Chợ Đũi kindergarten for Local Girls) 1950 - 1954 (Tôn Thọ Tường Primary School for Girls) 1954 - 1962 (Phan Văn Trị Primary School) 1962 - 1979 (Cô Giang Secondary School) 1979 - Now	8 Trần Hưng Đạo street, Phạm Ngũ Lão Ward, District 1, Ho Chi Minh City.	Semi-public, High school, co-ed	Homepage
High School for Gifted Sports and Physical Education	2002 - Now	43 Điện Biên Phủ street, Đa Kao ward, District 1, Ho Chi Minh City.	Public, High school, Sports school, co-ed	Homepage
The Asian International School (Thái Văn Lung Campus and Trần Nhật Duật Campus 1 and 3 )	1999 - Now (Primary School - IPS) 2002 - Now (High School - AHS)	Thái Văn Lung Campus: 2 Bis Thái Văn Lung Street, Bến Nghé Ward, District 1, Ho Chi Minh City. Trần Nhật Duật Campus 1 and 3: 29-33 and 39C Trần Nhật Duật Street, Tân Định Ward, District 1, Ho Chi Minh City. Trần Nhật Duật Campus 2: 41/3 - 41/4 Bis Trần Nhật Duật Street, Tân Định Ward, District 1, Ho Chi Minh City.	Private, High school (only in Thái Văn Lung Campus), Secondary school, Primary school, co-ed	Homepage
Asia Pacific College	2006 - Now	33 C-D-E Nguyễn Bỉnh Khiêm Street, Đa Kao Ward, District 1, Ho Chi Minh City.	Private, High school, Primary school, Kindergarten, co-ed	Homepage

=== University ===
Name	Established	Address
Posts and Telecommunications Institute of Technology	-	11 Nguyễn Đình Chiểu street
Hoa Sen University	-	8 Nguyễn Văn Tráng
Conservatory of Ho Chi Minh City	-	112 Nguyễn Du
Ho Chi Minh City University of Social Sciences and Humanities	1955	10 - 12 Đinh Tiên Hoàng
Faculty of Pharmacy, Ho Chi Minh City Medicine and Pharmacy University	-	41 Đinh Tiên Hoàng
Banking University of Ho Chi Minh City	-	125 Cống Quỳnh

== Office buildings ==
Mostly grade A office towers of the city are located in District 1.

Name	Address
Bitexco Financial Tower	No. 2 Hải Triều Street, District 1, HCMC
Central Plaza	17 Lê Duẩn Blvd, District 1, HCMC
Citilight Tower	45 Võ Thị Sáu Street, District 1, HCMC
CJ Building	2–4–6 Lê Thánh Tôn Street, District 1, HCMC
Deutsches Haus	33 Lê Duẩn Blvd, District 1, HCMC
Diamond Plaza	34 Lê Duẩn Blvd, Bến Nghé Ward, District 1, HCMC
Exchange Tower	16 Võ Văn Kiệt Blvd, District 1, HCMC
Green Power Tower	35 Tôn Đức Thắng Blvd, District 1, HCMC
HD Tower	25bis Nguyễn Thị Minh Khai Street, District 1, HCMC
HMC Tower	193 Đinh Tiên Hoàng Street, District 1, HCMC
Havana Tower	132 Hàm Nghi Blvd, District 1, HCMC
Saigon Marina IFC	No. 2 Tôn Đức Thắng Blvd, District 1, HCMC
Melinh Point Tower	No. 2 Ngô Đức Kế Street, District 1, HCMC
Metropolitan Tower	235 Đồng Khởi Street, District 1, HCMC
mPlaza Saigon	39 Lê Duẩn Street, District 1, HCMC
Opera View	161 Đồng Khởi Street, District 1, HCMC
President Place	93 Nguyễn Du Street, District 1, HCMC
Riverside Place	3C Tôn Đức Thắng Blvd, District 1, HCMC
Royal Centre Tower	235 Nguyễn Văn Cừ Blvd, District 1, HCMC
Ruby Tower	81–85 Hàm Nghi Blvd, District 1, HCMC
Saigon Centre	65–67 Lê Lợi Blvd, District 1, HCMC
Saigon Tower	29 Lê Duẩn Blvd, District 1, HCMC
Saigon Finance	No. 9 Đinh Tiên Hoàng Street, District 1, HCMC
Saigon Times Square	22–36 Nguyễn Huệ Street, District 1, HCMC
Saigon Trade Center	37 Tôn Đức Thắng Blvd, District 1, HCMC
Sailing Tower	111A Pasteur Street, District 1, HCMC
Sunwah Tower	115 Nguyễn Huệ Street, District 1, HCMC
TNR Tower	180–192 Nguyễn Công Trứ Street, District 1, HCMC
Vietcombank Tower	No. 5 Mê Linh Square, District 1, HCMC
Zen Plaza	54–56 Nguyễn Trãi Street, District 1, HCMC

== Tourist sights ==
=== Historical sights ===
Buildings such as the Saigon Notre-Dame Basilica, the Saigon Opera House, the Central Post Office, the City Hall, Phạm Ngũ Lão Street, the former Republic of Vietnam President's Reunification Palace, Ho Chi Minh City Museum of Fine Arts, Hotel Majestic, Tao Dan Park, and Rex Hotel are some of the most famous historical sights in District 1. Besides these places, most streets in District 1 built and designed since 1946 were completed by the French. Most of the buildings constructed since the French colonial era are still standing, with most having been recently renovated.

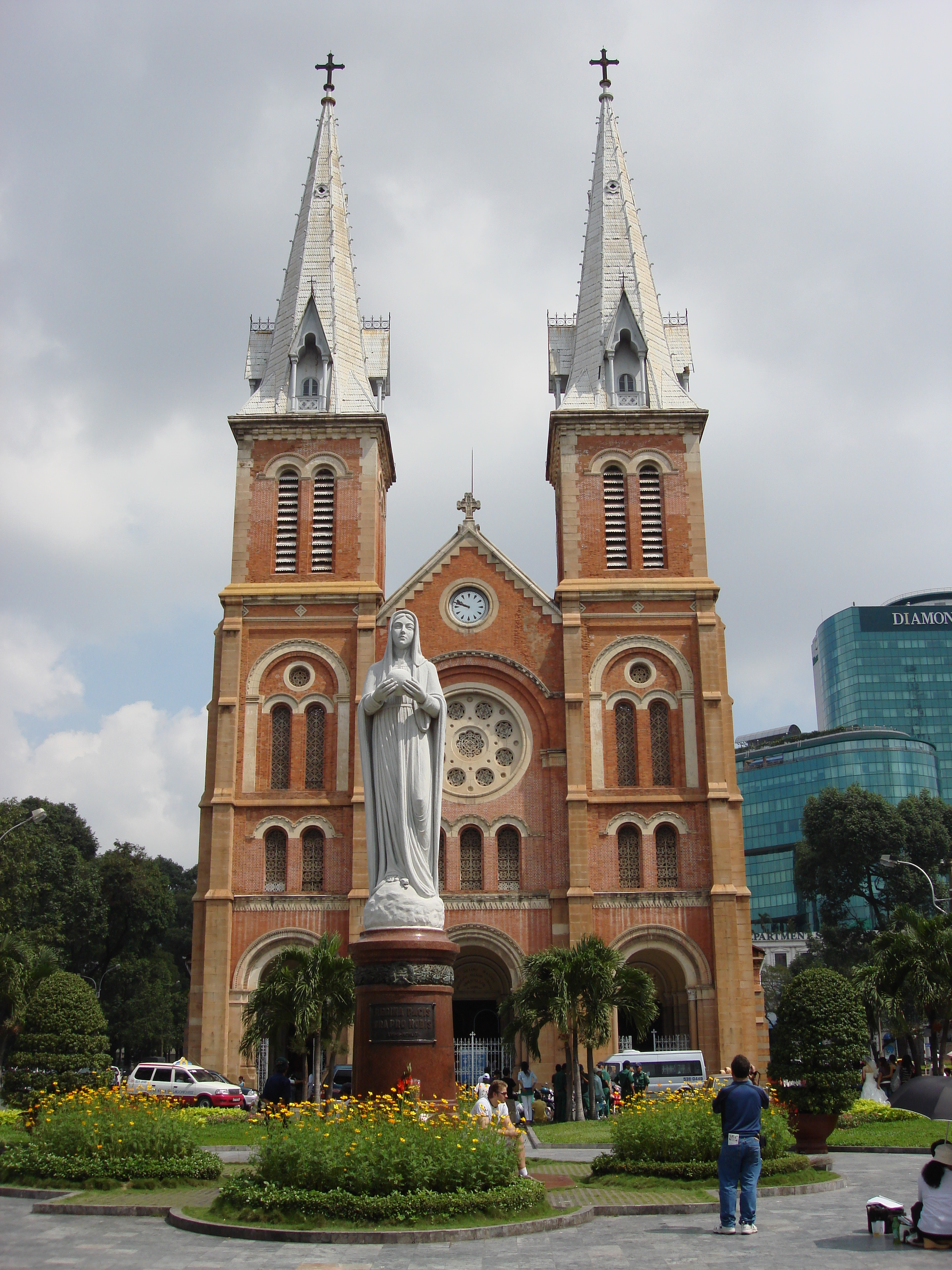
Notre-Dame Cathedral Basilica of Saigon

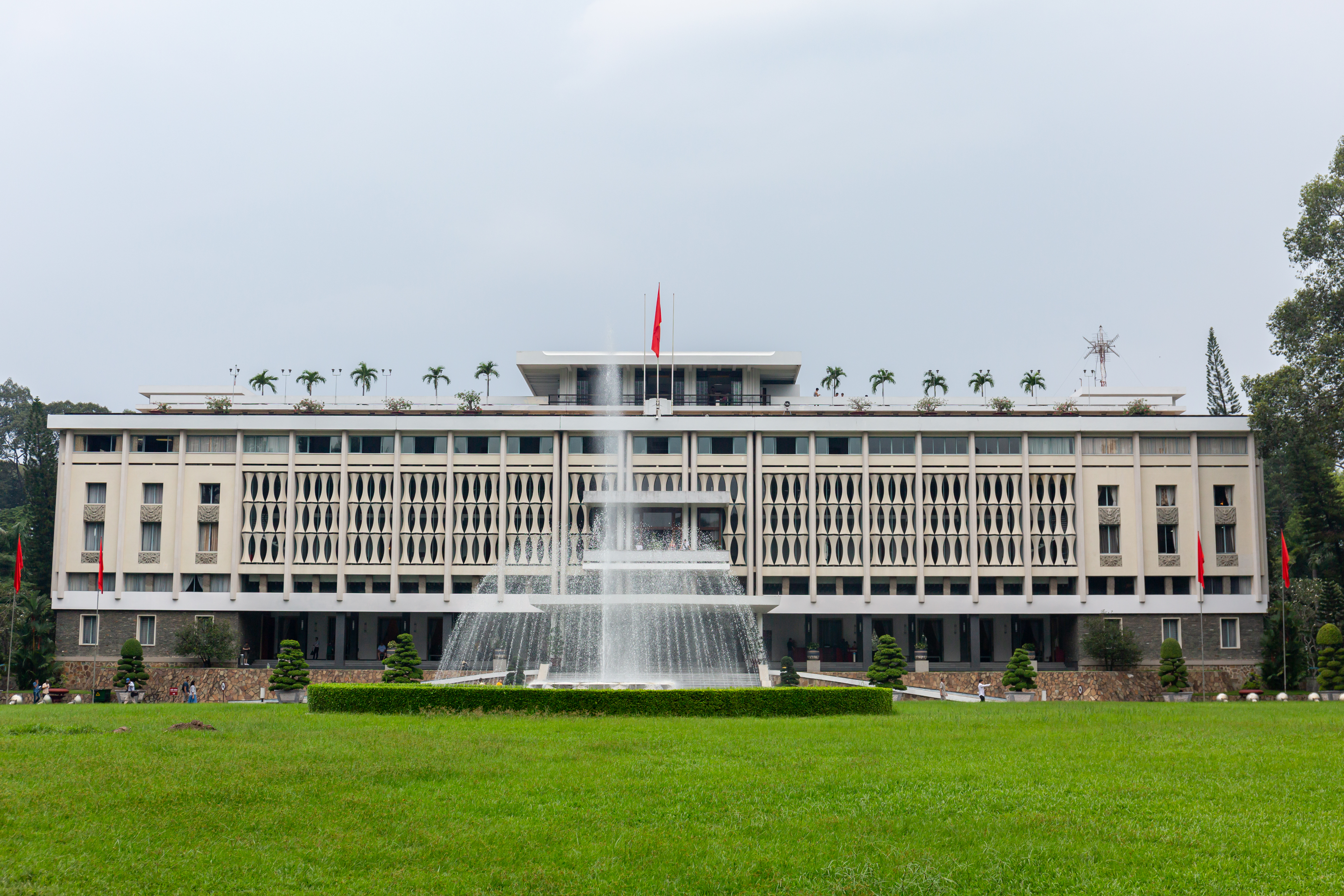
Independence Palace

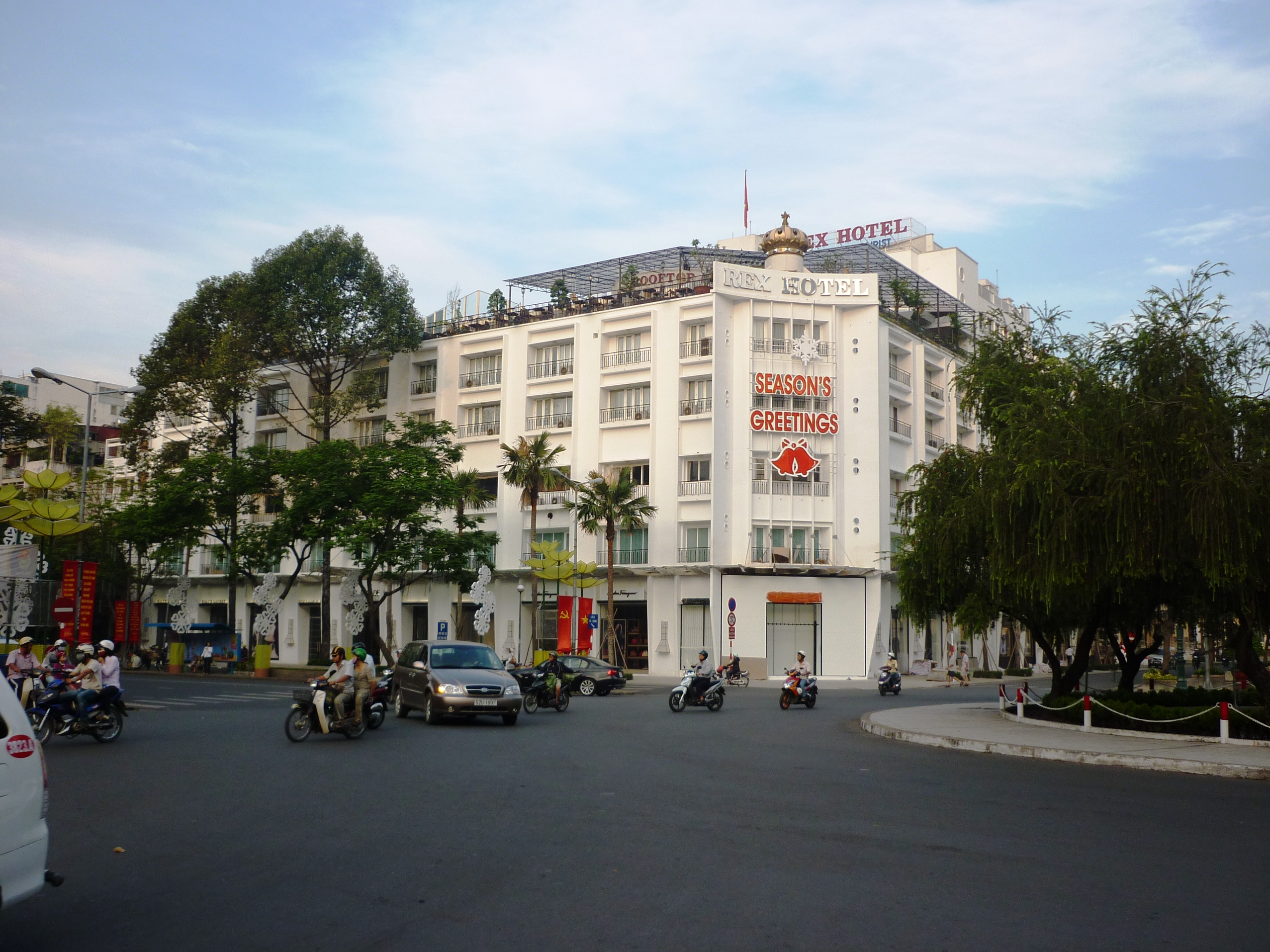
Rex Hotel

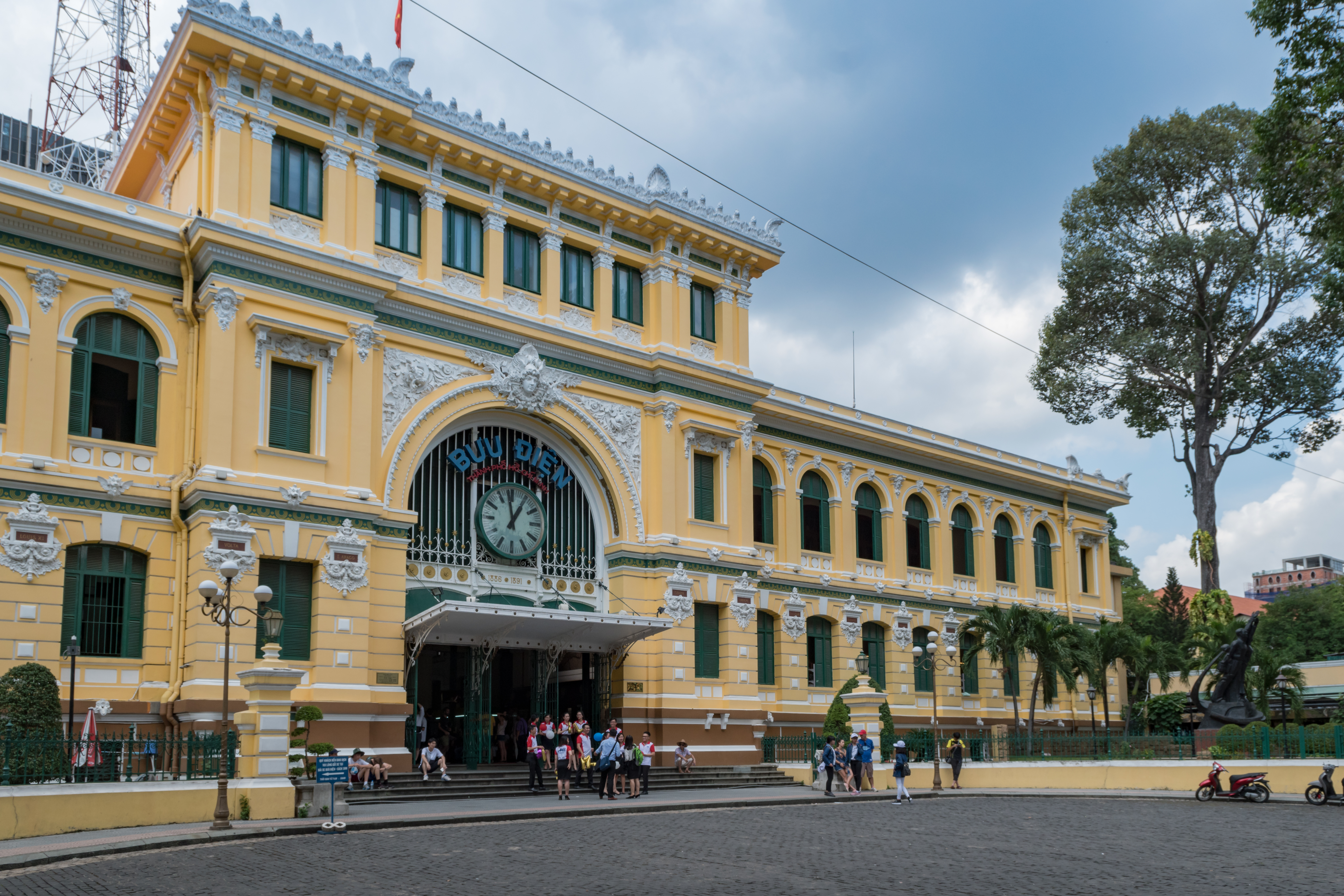
Saigon Central Post Office

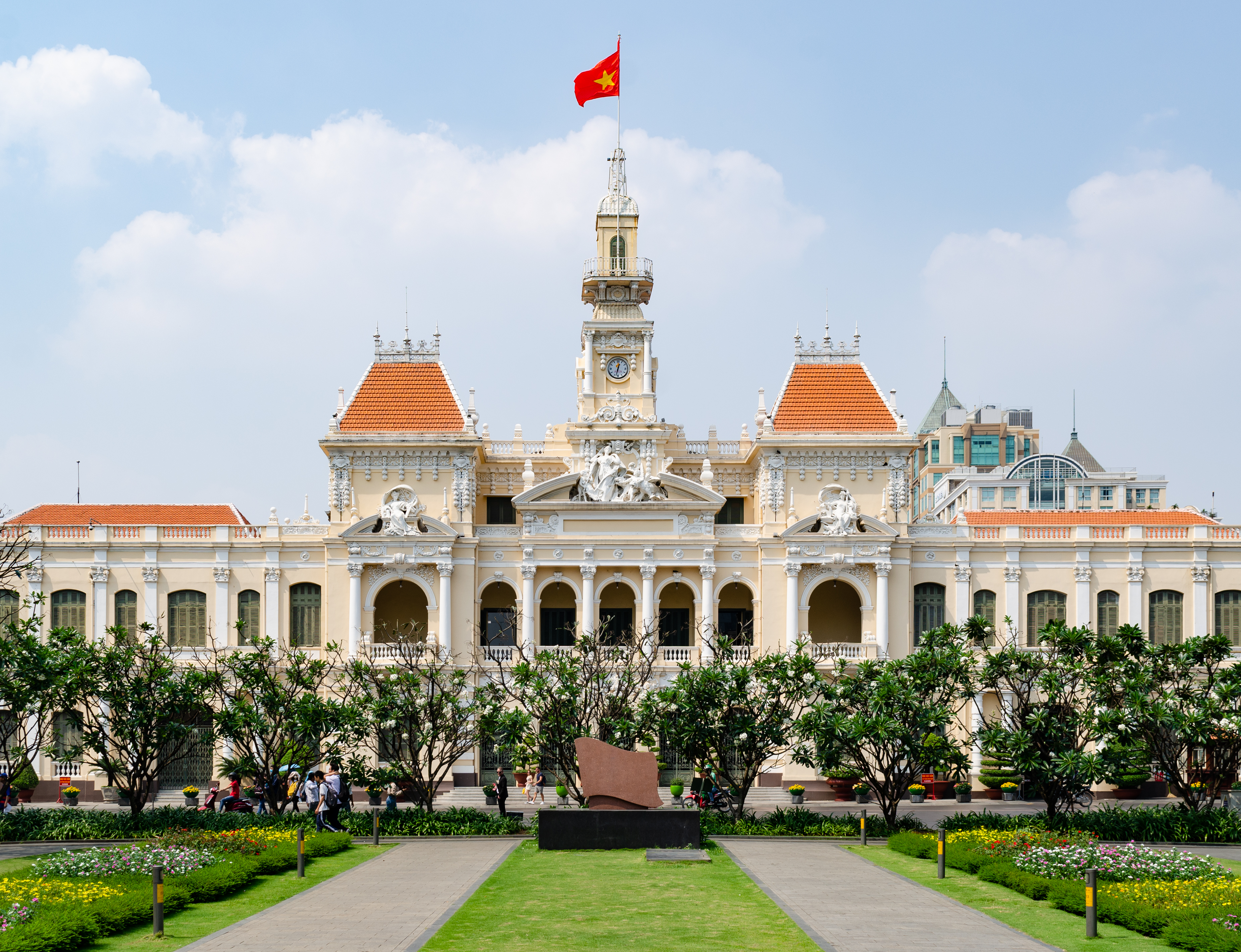
Ho Chi Minh City Hall

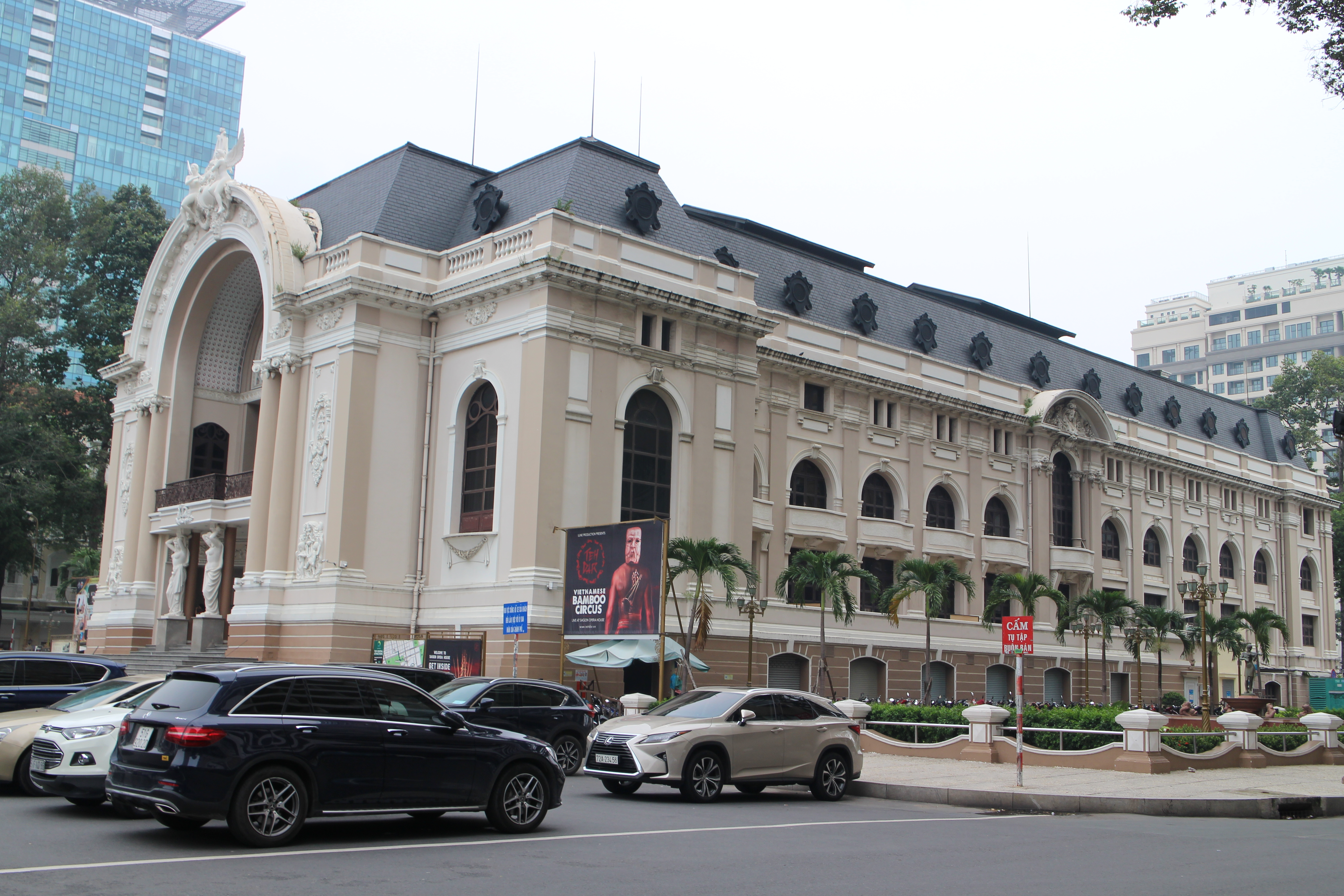
Saigon Opera House

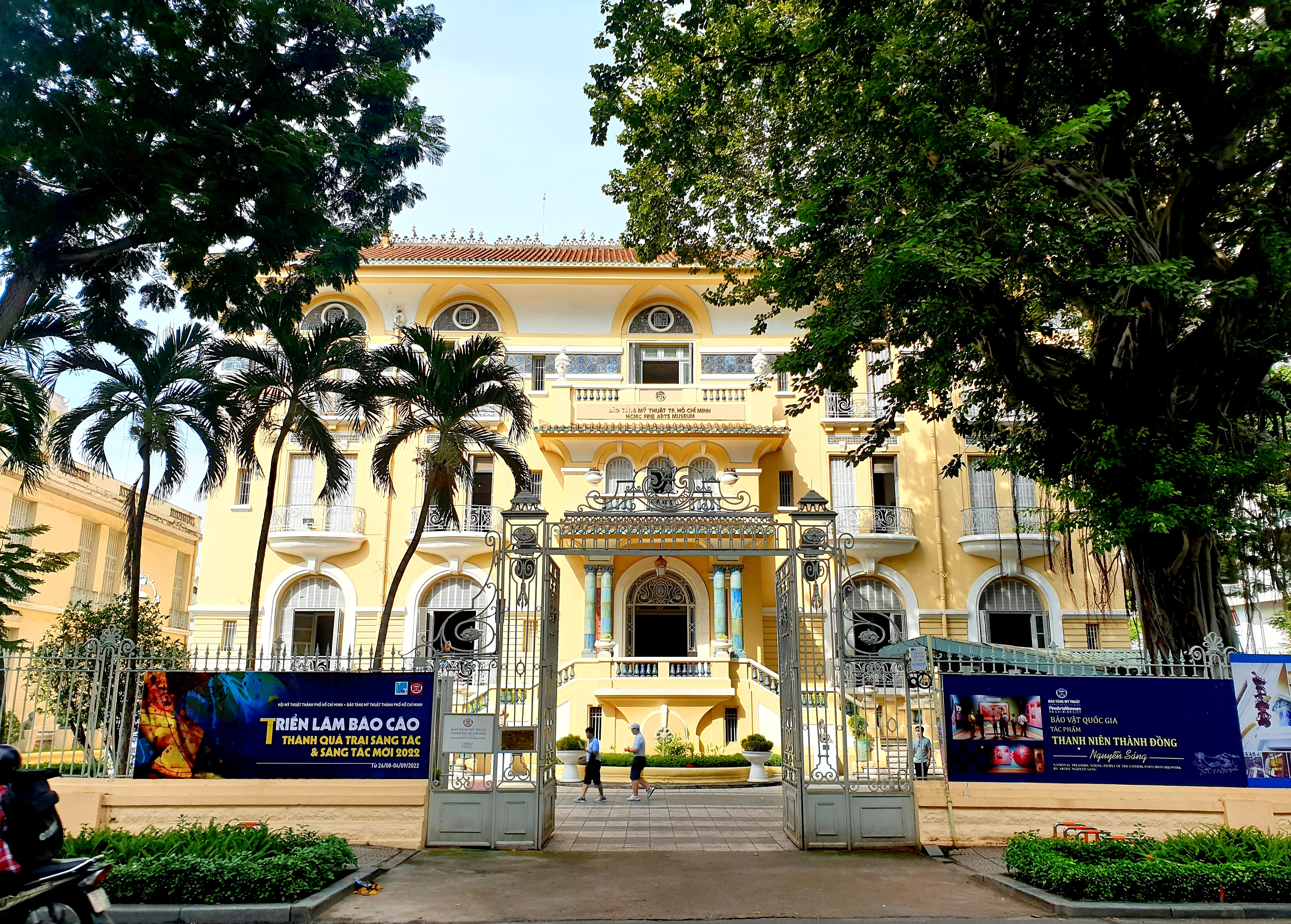
Ho Chi Minh City Museum of Fine Arts

=== Other Attractions ===
The Bitexco Financial Tower, completed in 2010 and was the tallest building of the city and the country until the Landmark 72 in 2011 replace its as the tallest in Vietnam and Landmark 81 in 2018 replace its from both the title; yet, it is still a symbol of modernity mixed with cultural influences. The Bùi Viện and Nguyễn Huệ districts are also interesting places for visitors.

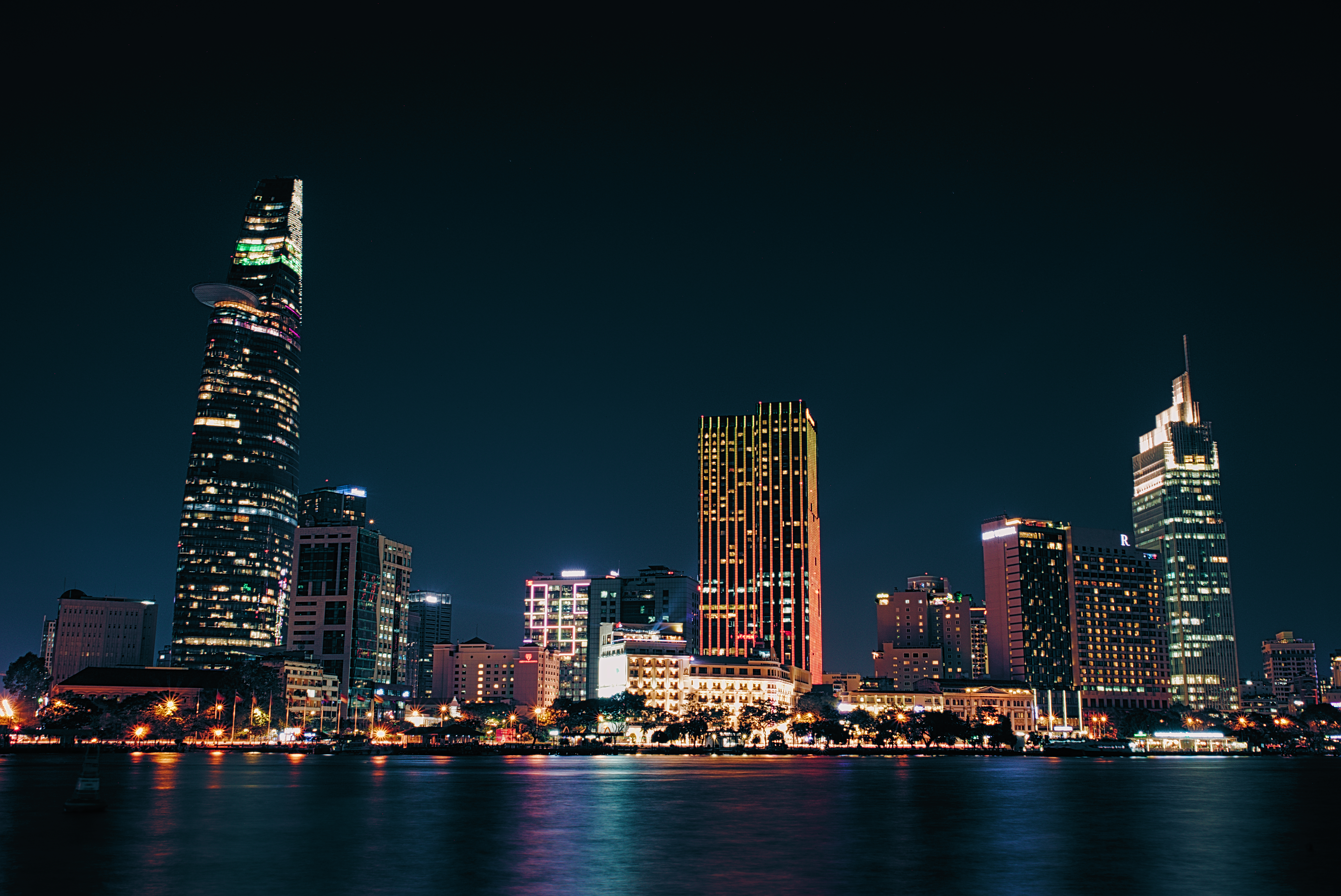
Saigon River Skyline

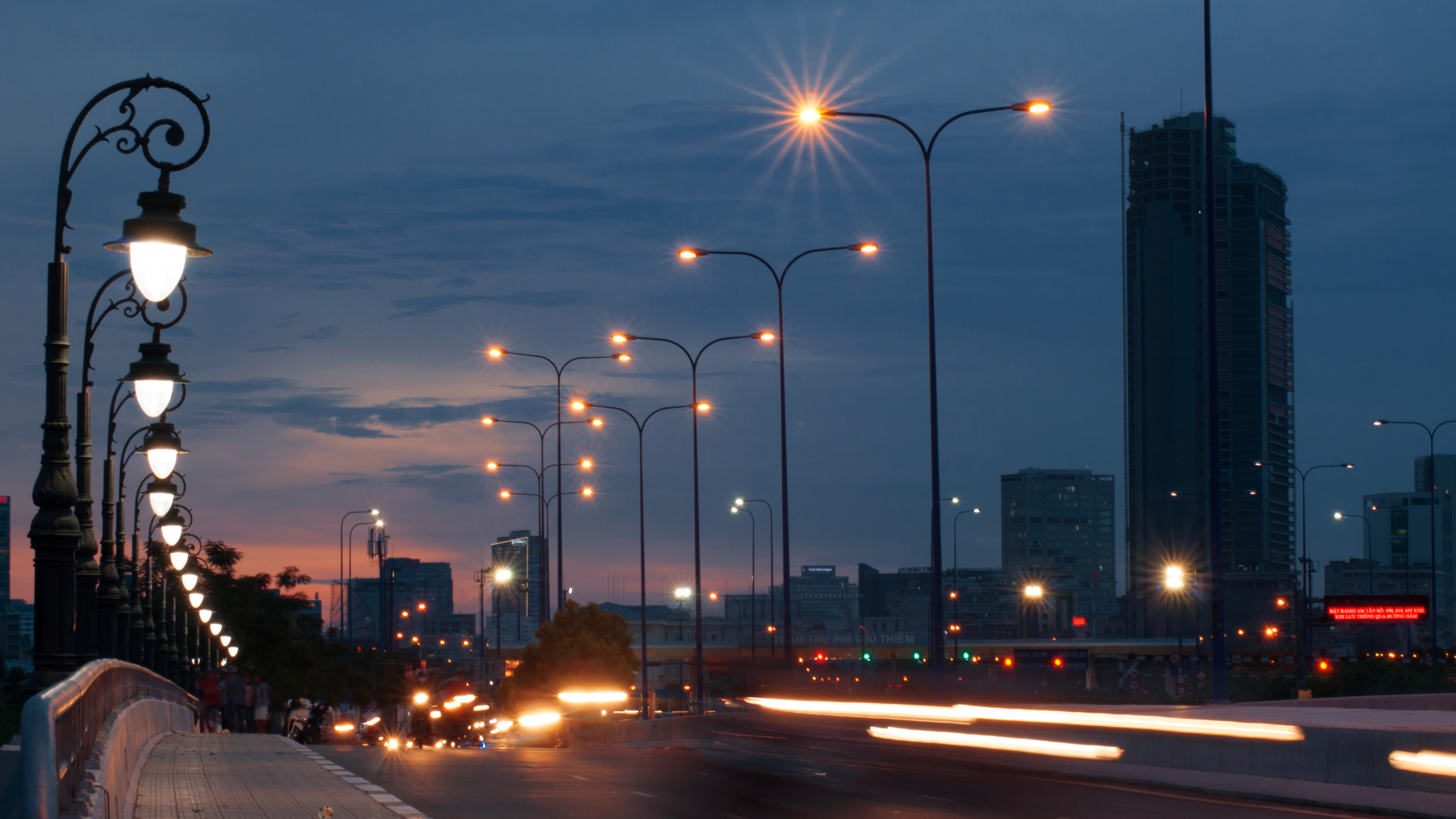
Row of hotel and office high-rises skyline seen from Thủ Thiêm Tunnel roof
