= Jade Emperor Pagoda =

Taoist pagoda in Ho Chi Minh City, Vietnam

- Chùa Ngọc Hoàng
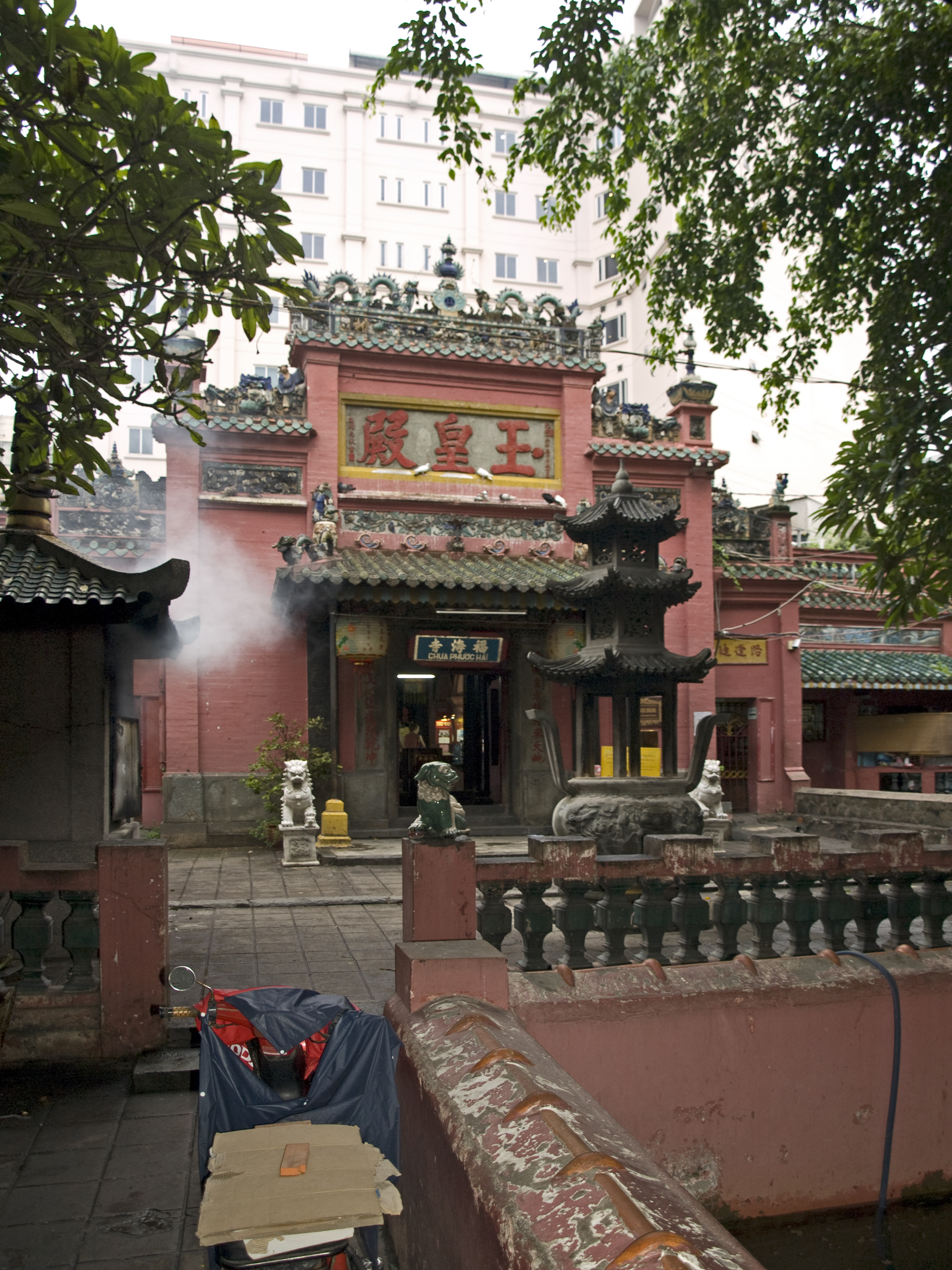
- The main entrance

- Location within Vietnam
- Alternative names: Phước Hải Tự, Chùa Đa Kao

General information
- Location: 73 Mai Thị Lựu Street, Đa Kao, District 1, Ho Chi Minh City, Vietnam
- Coordinates: 10°47′30.16″N 106°41′52.40″E
- Completed: 1909
- Owner: Vietnamese Buddhist Association

Design and construction
- Developer: Lưu Minh (or Lưu Đạo Nguyên)

The Jade Emperor Pagoda (Vietnamese: Chùa Ngọc Hoàng; name: Ngọc Hoàng Điện, 玉皇殿, "Jade Emperor Hall", French: Temple Đa Kao, Pagode de l'Empereur de Jade) also known as the Phước Hải Tự (Vietnamese: Chùa Phước Hải; 福海寺, "Luck Sea Temple") is a Taoist, Buddhist, Confucian pagoda located at District 1, Ho Chi Minh City, Vietnam. It was founded by a Chinese merchant named Liu Daoyuan (劉道源, Lưu Minh or Lưu Đạo Nguyên), a Cantonese migrant. It is also known from 1984 by the new Buddhist name Phước Hải Tự (福海寺, "Luck Sea Temple"). Then U.S. President Barack Obama paid a visit to the pagoda during his state trip to Vietnam on 22 May 2016.
