= Ho Chi Minh City University of Medicine and Pharmacy =

Medical school in Vietnam

Coordinates: 10.7556°N 106.6629°E

- Đại học Y Dược Thành phố Hồ Chí Minh
- Type: Public
- Established: 1947
- Rector: Prof. Trần Diệp Tuấn MD, Ph.D
- Location: Ho Chi Minh City, Vietnam
- Campus: Urban
- Website: ump.edu.vn

The Ho Chi Minh City University of Medicine and Pharmacy is a public medical university located in Ho Chi Minh City, Vietnam.

== Academics ==
The university has three campuses, four faculties, and a teaching hospital. The schools are upgraded from the former identically named faculties.

=== Schools and faculties ===
Names	Address
School of Medicine (Main Campus)	217 Hồng Bàng Boulevard, Ward 11, District 5
School of Pharmacy	41-43 Đinh Tiên Hoàng, Bến Nghé, District 1
School of Nursing and Medical Technology	201 Nguyễn Chí Thanh, Ward 12, District 5
Faculty of Basic Sciences	2A Phù Đổng Thiên Vương, Ward 11, District 5
Faculty of Odonto-Stomatology	652 Nguyễn Trãi, Ward 11, District 5
Faculty of Public Health	159 Hưng Phú, Hưng Phú Ward, District 8
Faculty of Traditional Medicine	221B Hoàng Văn Thụ, Ward 8, Phú Nhuận District

=== Hospital ===
Branch	Address
1 (Main Branch)	215 Hồng Bàng Boulevard, Ward 11, District 5
2	201 Nguyễn Chí Thanh, Ward 12, District 5
3	221B Hoàng Văn Thụ, Ward 8, Phú Nhuận District

== History ==
The university was initially a medical school within the University of Saigon (a university in the Republic of Vietnam period, not to be confused with the modern-day Saigon University). It was established in 1947 with Professor C. Massias serving as the principal during the period of French Indochina. It was located on the site of the historic Khải Tường Pagoda, originally at 28 Testardi Street, later renamed Trần Quý Cáp Street in District 3, Ho Chi Minh Cit, during the South Vietnam era. The site is now home to the War Remnants Museum on Võ Văn Tần Street. On August 31, 1961, under the Republic of Vietnam government, the school was divided into two institutions: Saigon College of Medicine and Saigon College of Pharmacy. In 1964, the Saigon College of Dentistry was established, branching off from the medical school.

In 1976, after the Vietnam War, the three schools were merged and renamed to Ho Chi Minh City University of Medicine and Pharmacy under the authority of the Communist Party of Vietnam. The initial headquarters consisted of two floors that housed offices, a library, a lecture room, and three adjacent buildings that were used for educational purposes.

The learning facilities for fundamental sciences and medicine were situated at various locations throughout Ho Chi Minh City. These included the Pasteur Institute for the study of parasitic microorganisms, the Human Body Institute for Anatomy, and the Saigon Hospital for Chemistry. The Human Body Institute facilitated learning in histology, physiology, pathology, and anatomy. The students of Medicine and Pharmacy studied at the main facility until 1961, when the Faculty of Pharmacy relocated to "Nam Ky Khoi Nghia Street."

On November 16, 1966, the school moved to the Medicine Learning Centre on Hong Bang Street in District 5. This facility, equipped with modern amenities, has served as an educational venue for medical and dental students. The centre includes a main auditorium with 500 seats, three additional 300-seat auditoriums, a library, and laboratory facilities.

On October 27, 1976, the government reorganised the schools at Saigon University Institute to create eight schools, which included the University of Medicine and Pharmacy at Ho Chi Minh City. Its new name, though not explicitly mentioning the dental school, has been officially used since 1976.

After the year 1990, the university and the Ministry of Health established additional faculties and one hospital, listed below:

- 1994: Faculty of Fundamental Sciences
- 1998: Faculty of Traditional Medicine and Faculty of Medical Technology and Rehabilitation (original name: Medicine Technique and Convalescent Faculty)
- 1999: Faculty of Public Health
- 2000: University Medical Centre

== Managing board ==
- Chairman: Professor, Trần Diệp Tuấn, M.D., Ph.D.
- Acting Rector: Associate Professor, Ngô Quốc Đạt, M.D., Ph.D.
