= Consulate-General of France, Ho Chi Minh City =

Diplomatic mission of France in Ho Chi Minh City

Consulate-General of France in Ho Chi Minh City
- Address: 27, Nguyên Thi Minh Khai, Saigon
- Inaugurated: 2003
- Website: Official website

The Consulate-General of France in Ho Chi Minh City (French: Consulat Général de France à Ho Chi Minh Ville or (la) résidence de France, Vietnamese: Tổng Lãnh sự quán Pháp tại Tp. Hồ Chí Minh) is a diplomatic mission of France to Vietnam. Located in Ho Chi Minh City (formerly Saigon), it previously served as an official residence for French leaders (1872-1945), the home of the French High Commissioner (1945-1954) and the embassy to South Vietnam (1954-1965, 1973–1975). As a consulate, it opened in 2003. It has been noted for its historical architecture and artifacts.

== History and architecture ==
The building housing the current consulate was originally built in 1872 by engineers from the French Navy in the historical center of the city and later gained recognition as one of the main buildings of the colonial era. It initially served as the official residence of the governor of Cochinchina and then various high-ranking military leaders of the same area, which led to the building gaining the alternative moniker (la) résidence de France.

During the First Indochina War, the High Commissioner of France resided here between 1945 and 1954. After the division of Vietnam following the 1954 Geneva Conference, the property became the embassy to South Vietnam. Relations between the countries were rocky due to French recognition of North Vietnam and other allegations of supporting communist forces as part of a policy of reconciliation, leading to a series of student protests at the embassy throughout the fall of 1963. As relations worsened, another protest occurred in July 1964 and involved 200 student demonstrators who destroyed furniture the equipment. Finally, in 1965, Nguyễn Cao Kỳ suspended relations and expelled the embassy, although ties were reportedly maintained at the consulate level. Relations were restored in 1973, and a new ambassador was accredited and took up residence in Saigon. Following the fall of Saigon in 1975, the French embassy was reportedly the only mission in Saigon allowed to continue operating semi-normally, with a Bastille Day celebration even being held; but it was closed later that year.

Eventually, the premises were restored by France in 2000 (the second renovation of the site following the first in 1959) and the consulate was opened in 2003. As part of the European Heritage Days program, the consulate annually holds tours for the public; in a 2019 article, Tuổi Trẻ noted the important place the consulate held as an example of French colonial architecture, the 19th-20th century Vietnamese "rare antiques and paintings" curated inside, and the botanical significance of the consulate grounds, which are the largest private park in the city.
