= Saigon Times Square =

Saigon's Times Square Building
- Tòa nhà Quảng trường Thời đại Sài Gòn
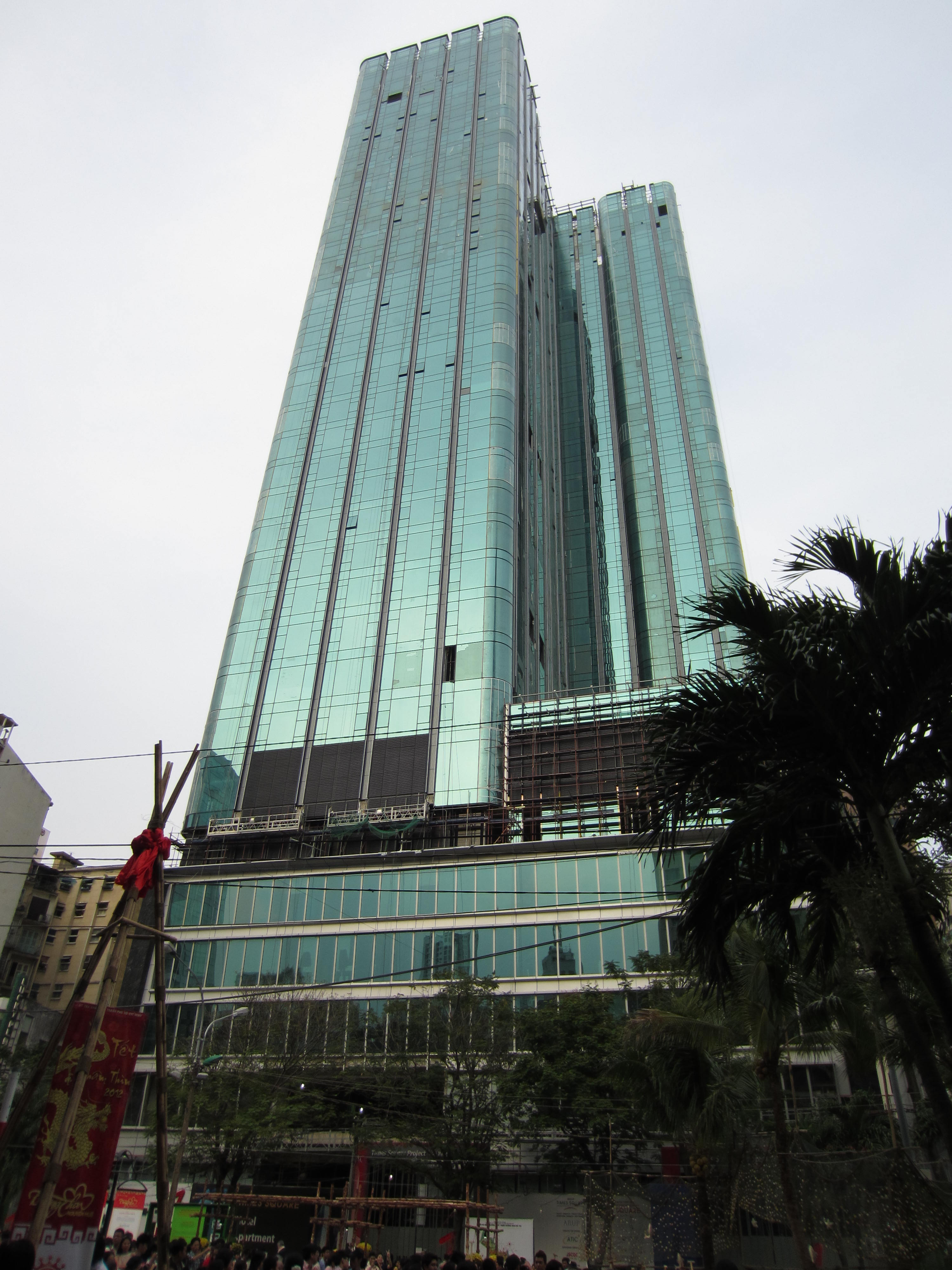
- Saigon Times Square viewed from Nguyễn Huệ Blvd
- Hotel chain: The Leading Hotels of the World

General information
- Status: Completed
- Type: Office, Shopping, Hotel, Residences
- Architectural style: Neo-futurism
- Classification: 5 stars
- Location: 22–36 Nguyễn Huệ Boulevard (Office & hotel tower), 57–69F Đồng Khởi Street (Residences tower), Bến Nghé, District 1, Ho Chi Minh City, Vietnam
- Construction started: 2008
- Completed: 2011
- Inaugurated: October 6, 2015; 11 years ago
- Cost: US$125 million
- Owner: Times Square Vietnam Investment JSC

Height
- Height: 165 m (541 ft)
- Tip: Helipad: 165 m (541 ft)
- Roof: 163.5 m (536 ft)
- Top floor: 39

Technical details
- Floor count: 40 (first floor marked as G)
- Floor area: 52,000 m^{2} (559,723 sq ft)
- Lifts/elevators: 6

Design and construction
- Architect: Ove Arup & Partners

Other information
- Number of rooms: 286 (Hotel) + 89 (Residential suites)
- Parking: 3 underground floors
- Public transit: L1 Opera House station L11 Nguyễn Huệ station (planned)

Website
- Saigon's Time Square Building

Saigon Times Square (Note: Written on official website as "Saigon's Times Square") or Times Square Saigon, simply as Times Square, is a high-rise building in Bến Nghé, District 1, Ho Chi Minh City, Vietnam. This building is a 40-storey joint tower and features a modern architectural style. Construction costs, invested by Times Square (Vietnam) Investment Joint Stock Company, totals approximately US$125 million. The height to the top of the tower is 164 m (538 ft). The tower was once the third tallest building in Ho Chi Minh City after Saigon One Tower and Bitexco Financial Tower before the Vietcombank Tower completed. Currently, Saigon Times Square ranks sixth in height in the city and 23rd nationally.

Times Square hosts The Reverie Saigon, a 286-room Leading Hotels of the World-affiliated luxury 6-star hotel (it is officially recognized as 5-star as laws in Vietnam does not have 6-star classification) along with 89 service apartments and 11,900 sqm of office space.

== Floor use ==
Tower	Nguyễn Huệ	Đồng Khởi
Level	Use	
27–39	The Reverie Saigon Hotel	The Reverie Saigon Hotel
19–26	The Reverie Saigon Hotel	The Reverie Saigon Residential Suites
9–18	Office spaces for leasing	
8	Meeting Rooms & Business Center	
7	Hotel reception lobby, information center	
6	Café Cardinal	Fitness Center – Spa & Pool
5	La Scala & San Carlo Ballrooms	
4	The Royal Pavilion (Long Triều) – Cantonese Restaurant	
1–3	Showrooms	
G	Main lobby and showrooms	
B1	Parking lot, Lift lobby	
B2–B4	Parking lot	

=== Notes ===
- The Reverie Lounge at Level 38-39
- Office space tenants: Bank of China, Deloitte, SMBC, QNB, Horizon Group, The Hour Glass, Mitsui & Co
- Featured brand showrooms: Baldi Home Jewels, Cappellini, Cassina, Frette, Giorgetti, La Galleria, Maxalto, Medea, Poltrona Frau, Venini, Visionaire, Rolex at The Hour Glass
- The Long @ Times Square Bar is located at the alley between Times Square Building with ACC1 Holdings Building (38 Nguyễn Huệ & 69 Đồng Khởi; Lucky Plaza Mall previosly) with entrances are on both streets of Đồng Khởi & Nguyễn Huệ.

== Gallery ==
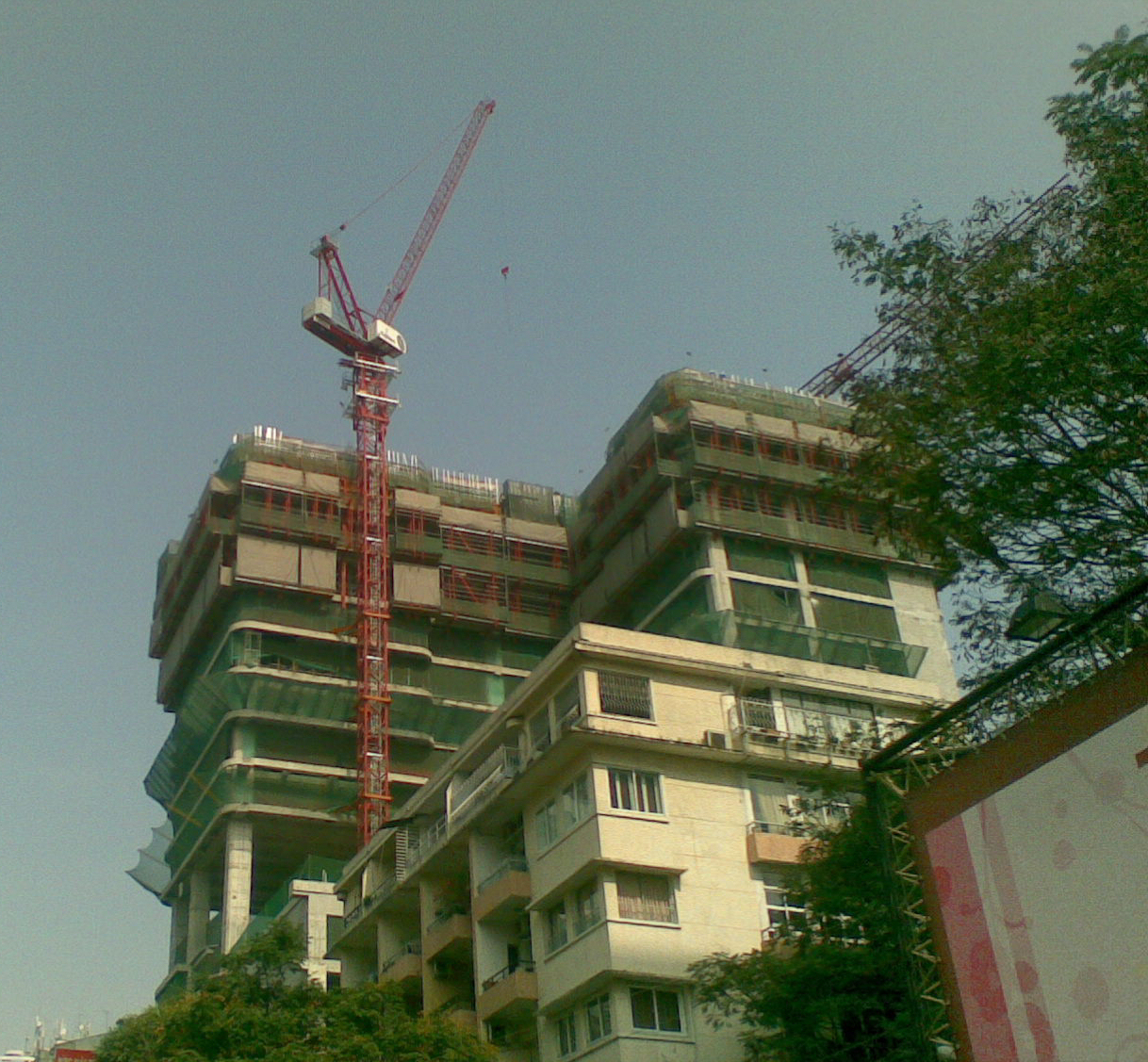
February 2011

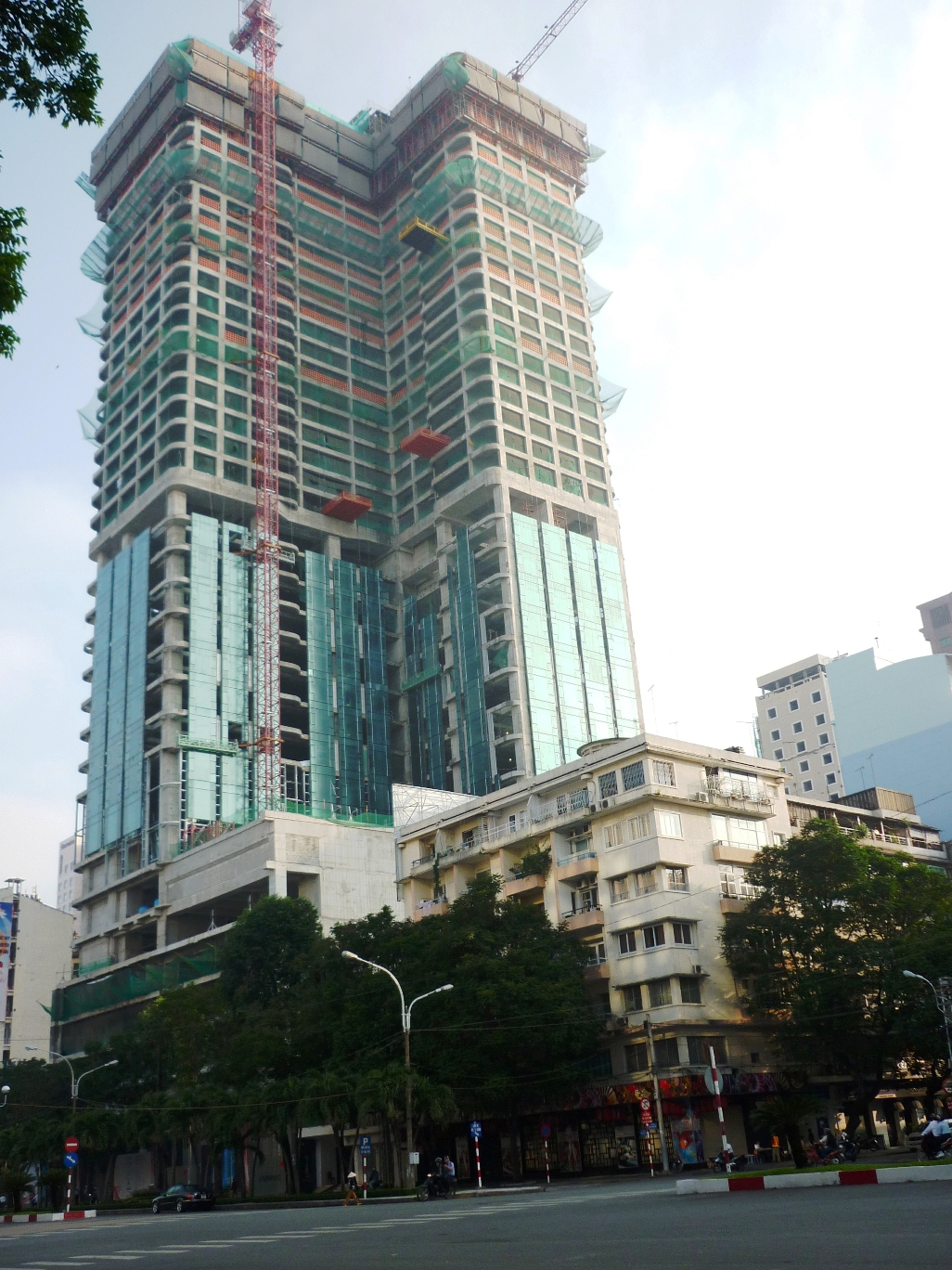
October 2011

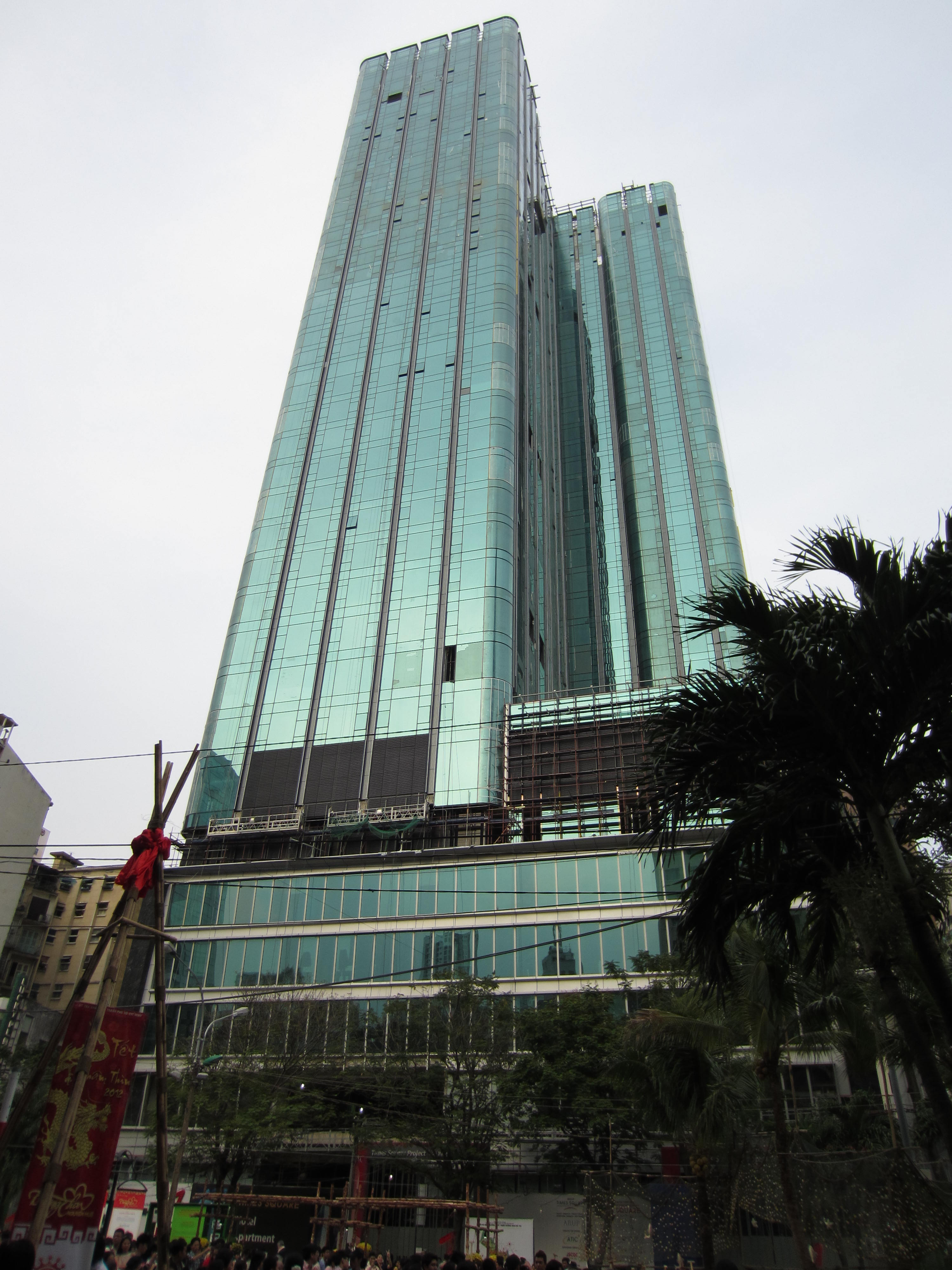
January 2012

Times Square Saigon at night

== See also ==
- List of tallest buildings in Vietnam
