= Giorgetti =

Giorgetti is an Italian surname, derived from Giorgio (George). Notable people with the surname include:

- Alberto Giorgetti (born 1967), Italian politician
- Alex Giorgetti (born 1987), Italian water polo player
- Antonio Giorgetti (1635–1669), Italian sculptor
- Daniel Giorgetti (born 1971), British composer
- Edoardo Giorgetti (born 1989), Italian swimmer
- Ferdinando Giorgetti (1796–1867), composer, violinist, educator and Italian publicist
- Florence Giorgetti (1944–2019), French stage and film actress
- Franco Giorgetti (1902–1963), Italian cyclist
- Giancarlo Giorgetti (born 1966), Italian politician
- Giuseppe Giorgetti, Italian sculptor
- Héctor Giorgetti (1956–2020), former Argentine footballer
- José Giorgetti (1934–2004), Argentine boxer
- Massimo Giorgetti (born 1959), Italian politician
- Roberto Giorgetti (born 1962), Sanmarinese politician
- Rodolfo Giorgetti (born 1971), Italian footballer
- Ugo Giorgetti (born 1942), Brazilian filmmaker
