= Barberini Faun =

Sculpture

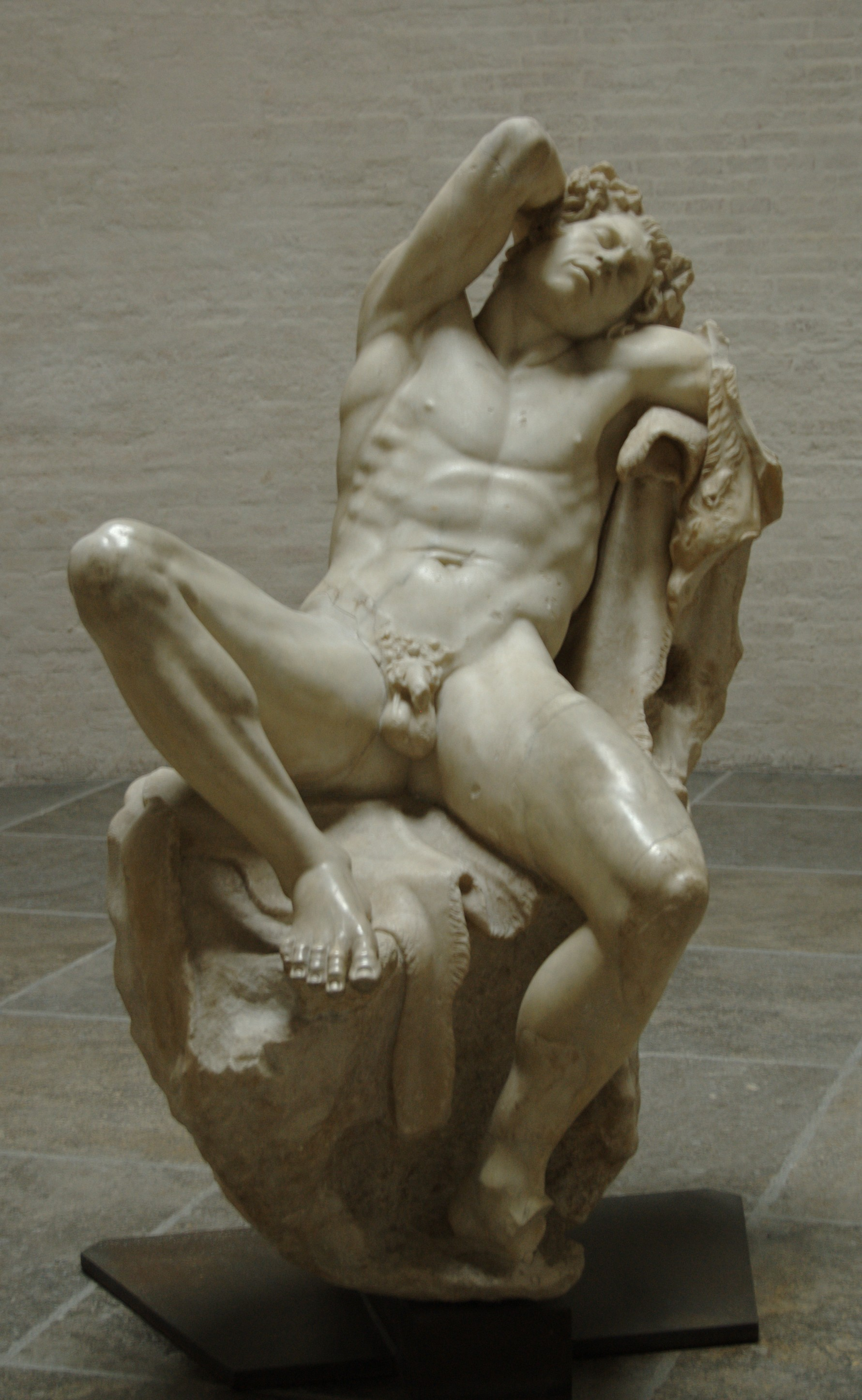
- The Barberini Faun
- Artist: Giuseppe Giorgetti: Restoration
- Year: 2nd century BC
- Catalogue: 11.2
- Type: Sculpture
- Medium: Marble
- Location: Glyptothek, Munich

The Barberini Faun (Italian: Fauno Barberini), (Note: Italian pronunciation: [ˈfawno barbeˈrini].) also known as the Drunken Satyr, is a life-size (Note: It is 215 cm long.) ancient but much restored marble statue currently displayed in the Glyptothek in Munich, Germany. After it was excavated and restored in Rome in the 1620s it became famous, and several copies were made — notably one by Edmé Bouchardon, now at the Louvre.

A faun is the Roman equivalent of a Greek satyr. In Greek mythology, satyrs were human-like male woodland spirits, traditionally represented — though notably not at the Barberini Faun depiction — with animal features including goat-like tail, hooves, ears, and horns.

== History ==
The sculpture was either carved by an unknown Hellenistic sculptor of the Pergamene school, in the late third or early second century BCE or is a Roman copy of high quality, though its present form was given it by a series of restorers in Rome, ending with Vincenzo Pacetti. The statue was found in the 1620s in the moat below the Castel Sant'Angelo, Rome, which in antiquity had been Hadrian’s Mausoleum. Work on the fortification was undertaken by the Barberini Pope Urban VIII in 1624. The sculpture made its first documented appearance in a receipt for its restoration, 6 June 1628, when it already belonged to the Pope's nephew, Cardinal Francesco Barberini. When discovered, the statue was heavily damaged; the right leg, parts of both hands, and parts of the head were missing. The historian Procopius recorded that during the siege of Rome in 537 the defenders had hurled down upon the Goths the statues adorning Hadrian's Mausoleum, and Johann Winckelmann speculated that the place of discovery and the statue's condition suggested that it had been such a projectile.

External videos
- smARThistory - Barberini Faun, c. 220 B.C.E.

It was traditionally asserted that Cardinal Maffeo Barberini commissioned Gian Lorenzo Bernini to restore the statue, "but there is no evidence for the tradition that Bernini was in any way involved with the statue," Francis Haskell and Nicholas Penny observed in 1981, after reviewing the documentation and literature. Restorations, at first in stucco, were remade in 1679 by Giuseppe Giorgetti and Lorenzo Ottoni, who enabled the antique left leg to be reaffixed and provided the elaborate supporting structure that is illustrated in Paolo Alessandro Maffei's Raccolta di statue (1704); (Note: The engraving is reproduced in Haskell & Penny 1981, fig. 16.) in the eighteenth century the right leg was again restored in marble, and once more by Vincenzo Pacetti in 1799. (The sculpture is shown today without the restored hanging left arm.)

These restorations of the Barberini Faun may have enhanced the sexual aspect of the statue. Because of this, the statue has acquired a reputation as an example of erotic art. Nudity in Greek art was nothing new; however, the blatant sexuality of this work makes it most interesting to twenty first century eyes. His wantonly spread legs focus attention on his genitals. Not all viewers have found the Faun so indecorous: the Barberini Faun was reproduced on a Nymphenburg porcelain service in the 1830s.

The statue was housed in the Palazzo Barberini, Rome, until it was sold in 1799 to the sculptor and restorer Vincenzo Pacetti; Pacetti offered it to various English and French clients, including Lucien Bonaparte. The Barberini brought suit to annul the sale and eventually sold the Faun, after much public competition and a ban on its exportation, strongly supported by the antiquarian Carlo Fea and by Antonio Canova— to Ludwig, Crown Prince of Bavaria. Ludwig had planned a special room in the Glyptothek designed by the architect Leo von Klenze before the purchase was even finalized, and it was in place by 1827. The Glyptothek (Note: From Ancient Greek γλύφειν glúphein, lit. 'to carve'.) opened in 1830 to house Ludwig's sculpture collection.

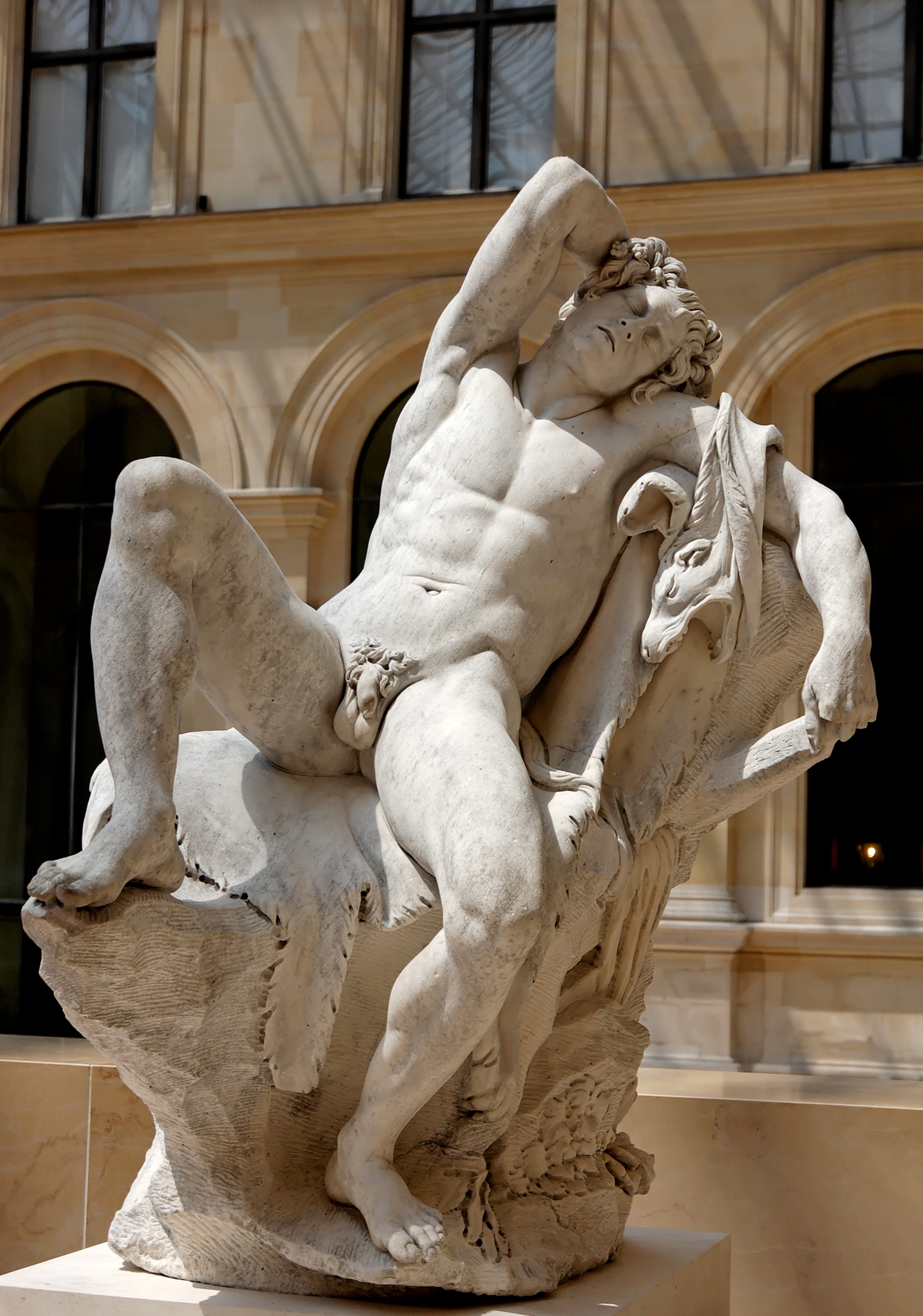
Copy by Edmé Bouchardon (Louvre)

== Copies ==
A marble copy was sculpted by Edmé Bouchardon at the French Academy in Rome in 1726 (illustration, right). Cardinal Barberini desired a plaster cast of it to keep with the antique original. Bouchardon's Barberini Faun arrived in France in 1732, greatly admired. In 1775, the duc de Chartres bought it for his elaborate garden plan at Parc Monceau. It is now in the Louvre Museum.

A copy by sculptor Eugène-Louis Lequesne was given to France in 1846. It is now located in the École nationale supérieure des Beaux-Arts.

A gilded copy is included among many other replicas of classical sculptures that adorn the grand cascade that descends from the back of Peter the Great's summer palace, Peterhof, outside of St. Petersburg, Russia.

== See also ==
- Portland Vase and Apollo Barberini, also collected by the Barberini
- List of works by Gian Lorenzo Bernini

== Sources ==
- Haskell, Francis; Penny, Nicholas (1981). Taste and the Antique: The Lure of Classical Sculpture 1500–1900. New Haven: Yale University Press. pp. 202–205. ISBN 978-0-3000-2641-2..
