= Vietcombank =

Vietnamese bank

Joint Stock Commercial Bank for Foreign Trade of Vietnam

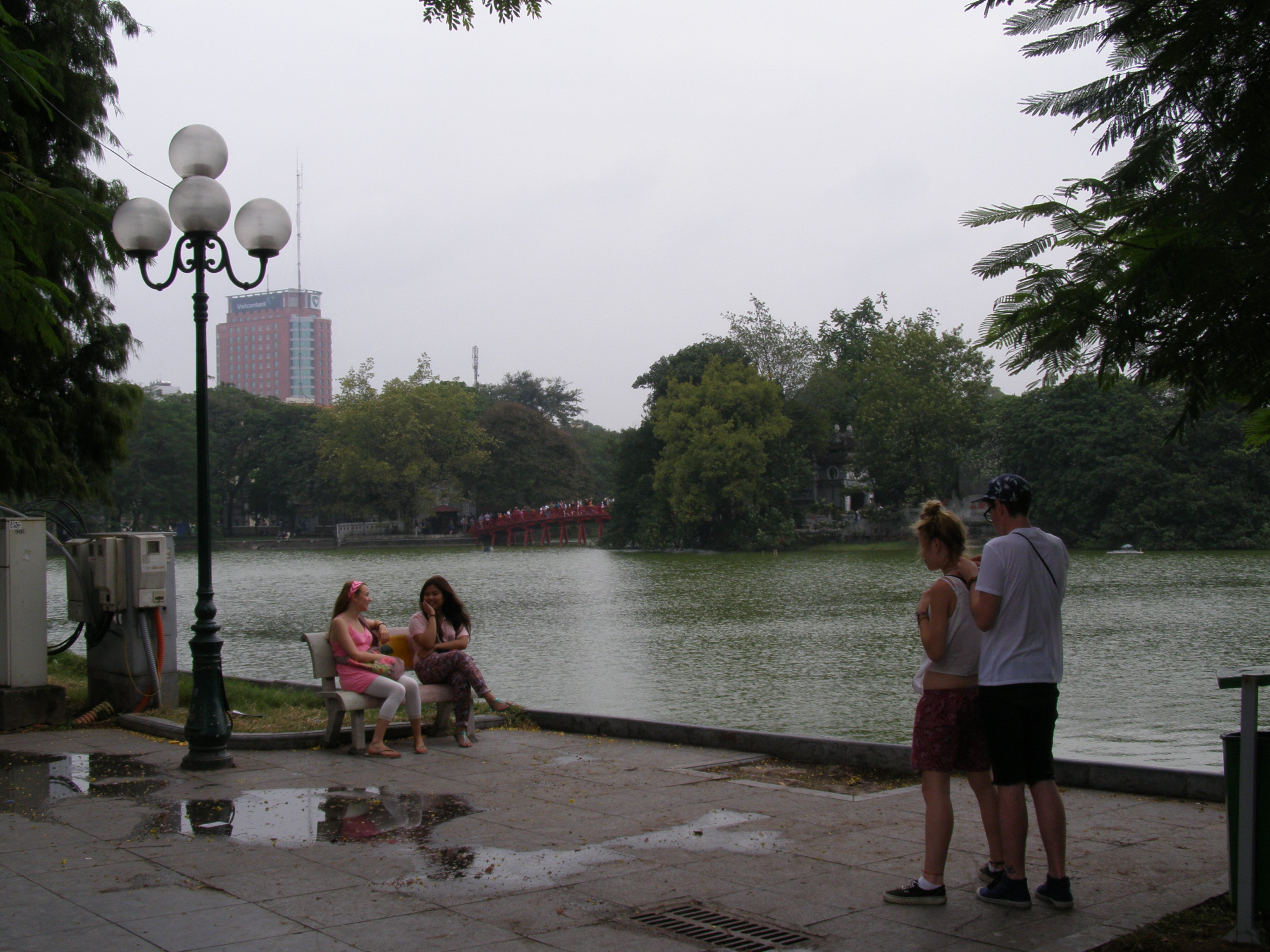
- Vietcombank headquarters seen from Hoàn Kiếm Lake
- Trade name: Vietcombank
- Native name: Ngân hàng Thương mại cổ phần Ngoại thương Việt Nam
- Type: Joint stock bank
- Traded as: HOSE: VCB
- Industry: Banking and Finance
- Founded: 1 April 1963; 63 years ago
- Headquarters: Hanoi, Vietnam
- Key people: Phạm Quang Dũng (chairman and chief executive officer)
- Products: List: Consumer banking Corporate banking Investment banking Insurance Mortgages Real estate
- Revenue: VND 36.84 trillion (US$ 1.72 billion) (2014)
- Net income: VND 577 trillion (US$ 27.01 billion) (2014)
- Total assets: VND 5.88 trillion (US$ 280 million) (2014)
- Total equity: VND 94.095 trillion (2020)
- Number of employees: + 23,000 (2025)
- Website: www.vietcombank.com.vn

Vietcombank or formally the Joint Stock Commercial Bank for Foreign Trade of Vietnam (Vietnamese: Ngân hàng TMCP Ngoại thương Việt Nam) is a major commercial bank in Vietnam.

== Overview ==
Vietcombank's headquarters are located in Hanoi, Vietnam. As of 2024, the bank had 131 branches and 536 transaction offices in Vietnam, 4 domestic subsidiaries, 3 international subsidiaries, 4 joint ventures and affiliates, and a representative office in Ho Chi Minh City, Singapore, and the United States. As of 30 June 2025, Vietcombank's market capitalization was VND 467.9 trillion (US$18.0 billion).

== History ==
Vietcombank was formerly the Foreign Exchange Management Department (FEMD) of the National Bank of Vietnam (NBV), established on January 20, 1955. In 1961, the FEMD was renamed the Foreign Exchange Bureau (FEB) under the State Bank of Vietnam (SBV).

Joint Stock Commercial Bank for Foreign Trade of Vietnam was founded on 1 April 1963 as Bank for Foreign trade of Vietnam. It was span off from the Foreign Exchange Bureau of the State Bank of Vietnam to be an exclusive bank for foreign trade.

In 1990, Vietcombank diversified its services from being exclusively focused on foreign trade to become a mass market commercial bank. In 1996 the bank's official name was changed to Joint Stock Commercial Bank for Foreign Trade of Vietnam.

In 2008, Vietcombank was selected by the government to be the pilot for privatization of state-owned companies. The bank was then after listed on the Ho Chi Minh Stock Exchange on 30 June 2009 after a successful IPO that raised US$652 million making it the biggest Vietnamese firm to conduct an initial public offering.

In 2011, Vietcombank signed a strategic shareholder agreement with Mizuho Corporate Bank, a member of Mizuho Financial Group, Japan. In 2013, Vietcombank launched a new brand identity system with the slogan "Shared trust - Strong future". In 2016, Vietcombank regained the top position in terms of profit in the Vietnamese banking market.

In 2018, Vietcombank became the first bank to be officially granted the decision to apply Basel II under Circular 41 by the State Bank of Vietnam. In 2019, Vietcombank became the first Vietnamese bank to have profit reaching the milestone of US$1 billion. In 2020, Vietcombank successfully went live with the core banking system.

In 2019, Vietcombank announced the opening of its representative office in New York on November 1. This opening was licensed by the New York State Department of Financial Services on June 17 and received official approval from the Federal Reserve Board.

In October 2024, Vietcombank became the second largest shareholder of Eximbank.

== Member companies ==
Other than providing banking services, Vietcombank has invested in subsidiaries, joint ventures and associates. These investments include but are not limited to the following:

	Name	Shareholding	Industry
1	Vietcombank Leasing Company Limited	100%	Financial leasing
2	Vietcombank Securities Company Limited	100%	Investment banking
3	Vietcombank Tower 198 Company Limited	70%	Real estate
4	Vietnam Finance Company Limited	100%	Financial services
5	Vietcombank Laos	100%	Commercial banking
6	Vietcombank Money Incorporated	75%	Money transfer
7	Vietcombank - Bonday - Ben Thanh Company Limited	52%	Real estate
8	Vietcombank Fund Management Company	51%	Investment fund management
9	Vietcombank - Cardif Life Insurance Company Limited	45%	Life insurance
10	Vietcombank Bonday Limited	16%	Real estate

== Ownership ==
The shares of the stock of Vietcombank are traded on the Ho Chi Minh Stock Exchange, under the symbol: VCB. As of 2024, The shareholding in the bank's stock was a follows:

Joint Stock Commercial Bank for Foreign Trade of Vietnam Stock Ownership
Rank	Name of Owner	Percentage Ownership
1	State Bank of Vietnam	74.80
2	Mizuho Bank, Ltd	15.00
3	Barclays	10.20
4	Ministry of Finance	55.40
5	Vietnam Social Security	100.00
6	State Capital and Investment Corporation	33.50
7	The Vanguard Group, Cinven and BlackRock	

== Governance ==
Vietcombank is governed by a seven-person board of directors with Pham Quang Dung serving as chairman and CEO.

== Vietcombank Tower ==
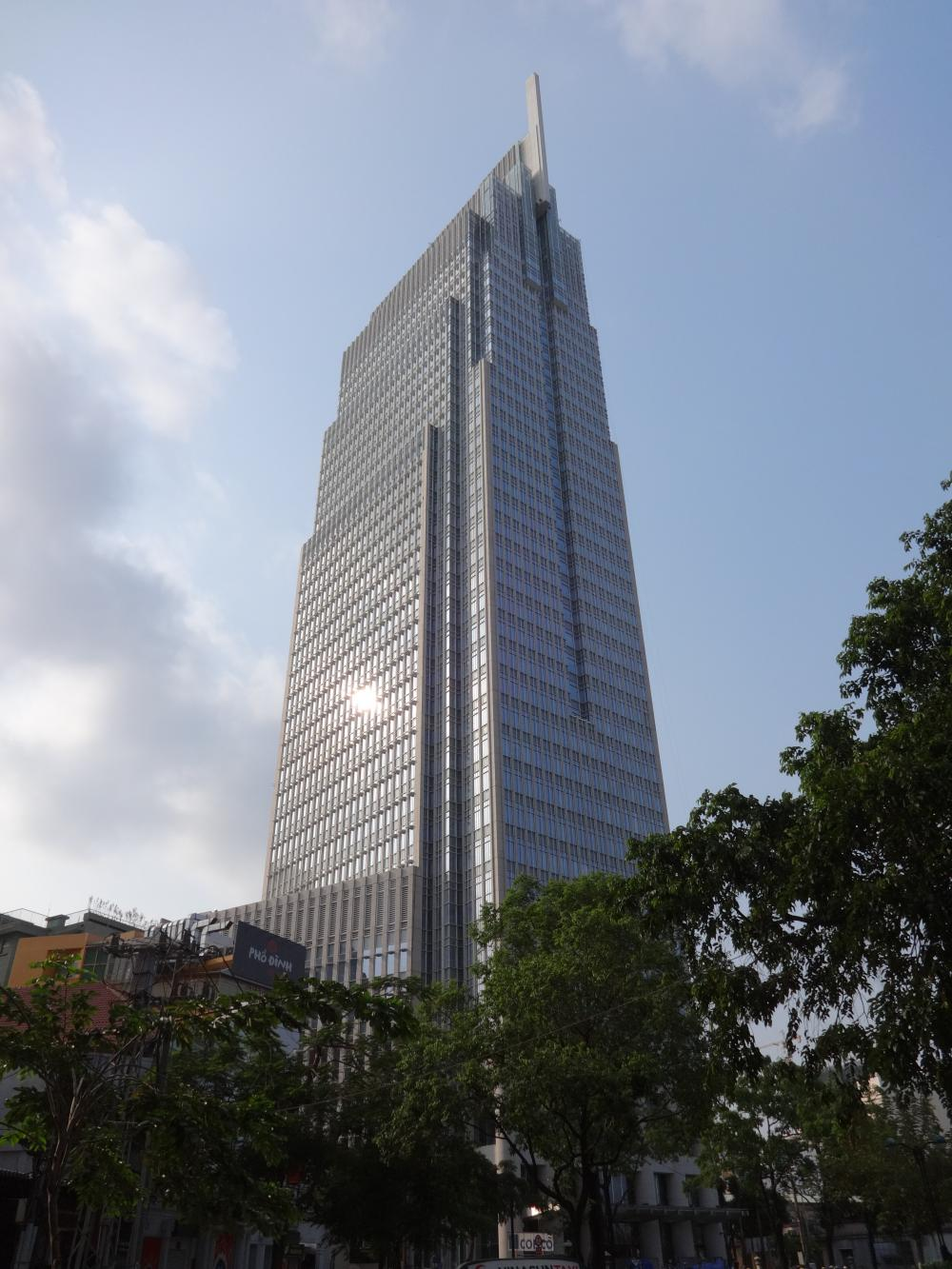
Vietcombank Tower

Vietcombank Tower, also known as Vietcombank Tower Saigon to distinct with the same name building in Hanoi, is a 35-storey building in Ho Chi Minh City, designed by Pelli Clarke Pelli Architects, an architects company of César Pelli.

The tower address is at No.5 Mê Linh Square, Saigon, Ho Chi Minh City. As of 2025, with the height of 206 meters, it is the fourth tallest building in Ho Chi Minh City and the ninth tallest building in Vietnam.

The construction began in 2011 and completed in 2014. Despite being said to be similar with Empire State Building, yet the differences of them is find from the modern architecture with gray colored-glass compared to the concept of Art Deco-style and the spire is put in the front façade as its inspiration is the crown of Hùng king, not the center of the roof like the rest one.

In addition to Vietcombank, corporate tenants with offices in the building include Lotte, Heineken Vietnam, Johnson & Johnson, SSI, Idemitsu, Sun Life Financial, and Pernod Ricard Vietnam.

== See also ==
- Banking in Vietnam
- List of banks in Vietnam
- State Bank of Vietnam
