= Vietcombank Tower =

Coordinates: 10.7757°N 106.7053°E

- Tòa nhà Vietcombank
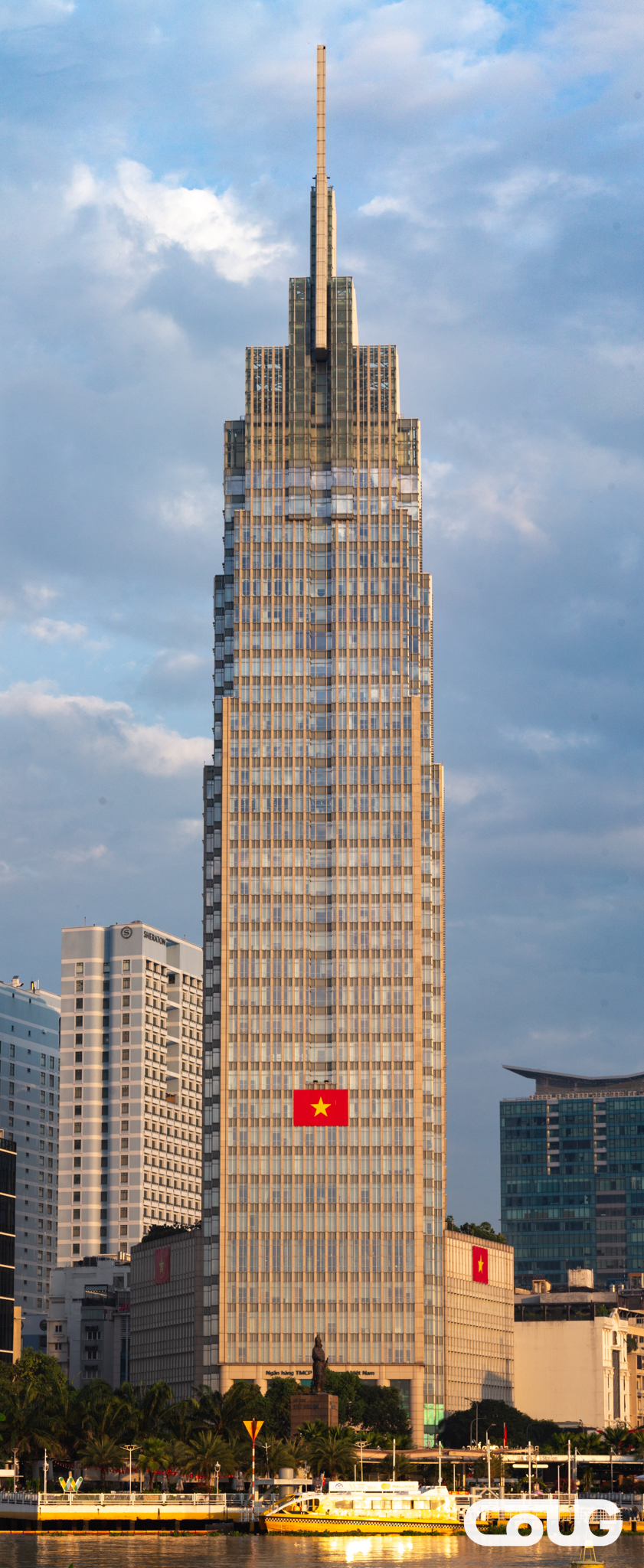
- Interactive map of the Vietcombank Tower area
- Alternative names: VBB Tower; Vietcombank Tower Saigon (Note: To distinguish with the Vietcombank Tower in Hanoi)

General information
- Status: Completed
- Type: Office
- Architectural style: Modernism
- Location: Bạch Đằng Quay, No. 5 Mê Linh Square, Bến Nghé, District 1, Ho Chi Minh City, Vietnam
- Year built: 2
- Groundbreaking: October 28, 2010; 15 years ago
- Construction started: October 2013; 12 years ago
- Completed: March 2015
- Inaugurated: November 7, 2015; 10 years ago
- Owner: Vietcombank – Bonday – Benthanh (VBB) JV, Ltd.

Height
- Height: 206 metres (675.8 ft)
- Tip: 206 metres (675.8 ft)
- Antenna spire: 20 metres (66 ft)
- Roof: 186 metres (610.2 ft)
- Top floor: 35

Technical details
- Floor count: 40 (included ground floor with 4 underground floors)
- Floor area: 71,000 m^{2} (764,238 sq ft)

Design and construction
- Architecture firm: Pelli Clarke Pelli, Ong&Ong Viegnam
- Structural engineer: Eurowindow
- Services engineer: REE M&E
- Civil engineer: Bachy Soletanche, Cofico

Other information
- Public transit: Ba Son station, Mê Linh station (planned)

Website
- vietcombanktower.vn

Vietcombank Tower is a skyscraper in Ho Chi Minh City. It is 205 m (673 ft) tall and has a floor area of 3,232m^{2} and has 35 above ground floors and 4 underground floors.

Currently, it is the 8th tallest building in Vietnam and the 3rd in Ho Chi Minh City. It is the headquarters of Vietcombank branch in HCMC, while its general headquarters are in Hanoi. The architect is César Pelli.

== Construction ==
Construction groundbroke in 2010 but actually started in 2013, the building was finished in 2015.

== Tenants ==
List of the current tenants of the building: Vietcombank, Baker McKenzie, Long An Energy Corporation, GS Energy, Heineken N.V., Hoa Sen Group, Home Depot, Idemitsu Kosan, Petrovietnam, Johnson & Johnson, Sun Life Financial, Shiseido, Sojitz, Pernod Ricard Vietnam, SSI, Russin & Vecchi, TCO Holdings, Unity Through Diversity
