= List of tallest buildings in Ho Chi Minh City =

This list of tallest buildings in Ho Chi Minh City ranks skyscrapers in the Vietnam second-largest city of Ho Chi Minh City by height.

Total number of buildings in Ho Chi Minh City
≥50m	≥100m	≥150m	≥200m	≥400m
1212	243	35	2	1

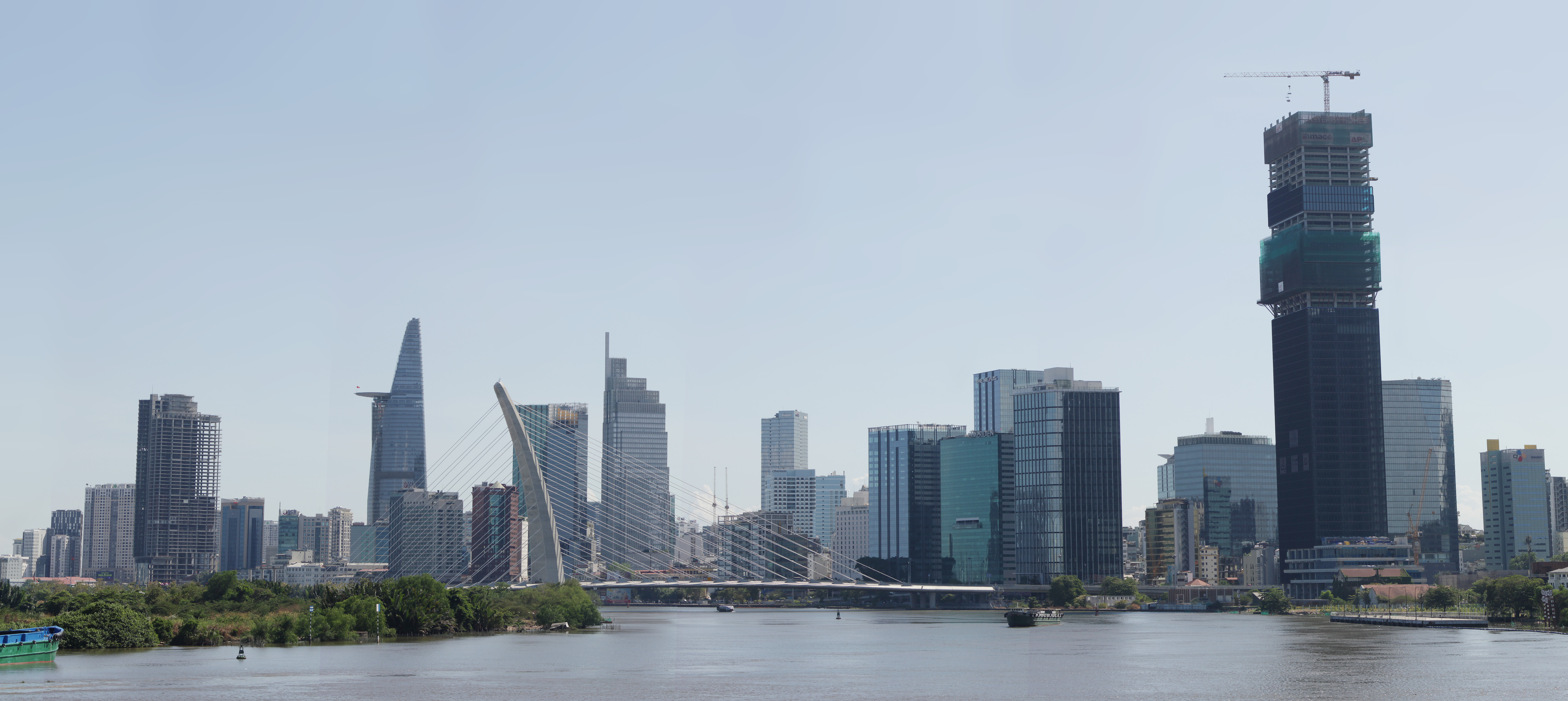
Ho Chi Minh City skyline in 2024 overlooking district 1.

== Tallest completed buildings ==
List of completed buildings with height of 110 meters or more.

Note: items in italics represent the estimated height of that building calculated based on the number of floors or according to buildings in the same complex

The tallest building in Ho Chi Minh City
The building was once the tallest in Ho Chi Minh City
The building has been partially completed
The building has been roofed

Class	Building	Image	District	Height	Floor	Complete	Notes
1	Landmark 81		Bình Thạnh	461,2	81 (+3 basements)	2018	The tallest building in Ho Chi Minh City and Vietnam. The tallest building 17th in the world and 2nd in Southeast Asia. The height to the top is 469.5m. The highest Skyview observatory in Vietnam is located on floors 79 to 81 of the building.
2	Bitexco Financial Tower	thế=	District 1, Ho Chi Minh City	262,5	68 (+3 basements)	2010	Vietnam's first building with a height of over 200m. This was the tallest building in Vietnam from when it was completed in 2010 until it was surpassed by Keangnam Hanoi Landmark Tower in 2011. The height to the highest point of the building is 264m.
3	Saigon Marina International Financial Centre		District 1, Ho Chi Minh City	240	55 (+5 basements)	2025	Initially named Landmark 60 Ba Son then The Sun Tower and owned by CapitaLand until July 2020 when Masterise owned it then officially renamed into Saigon Marina International Financial Centre (or IFC) or can also be called as Marina Central Tower. It is part of Grand Marina Saigon complex (Sài Gòn – Ba Son urban planning).
4	Vietcombank Tower	thế=	District 1, Ho Chi Minh City	206	35 (+4 basements)	2015	The 8th tallest building Vietnam. If only the roof is considered, the height of the building is 186m.
5	IFC One Saigon		District 1, Ho Chi Minh City	195,3	42 (+5 basements)	2022	Initially named Saigon One Tower, construction started in 2007 and stalled from 2011 until 2021, the building was continued and renamed IFC One Saigon as currently. When completed, it will become the 9th tallest building in Vietnam.
6	Saigon Centre 2		District 1, Ho Chi Minh City	193,7	42 (+6 basements)	2017	Phase 2 of the Saigon Centre complex building.
7	Cove Tower		District 1, Ho Chi Minh City	188	47 (+4 basements)	2025	Part of Grand Marina Saigon complex. It is the tallest apartment building in Ho Chi Minh City.
8	Sea Tower		District 1, Ho Chi Minh City	188	47 (+4 basements)	2025	Part of Grand Marina Saigon complex. It is the tallest apartment building in Ho Chi Minh City.
9	Lagoon Tower		District 1, Ho Chi Minh City	188	45 (+4 basements)	2025	Part of Grand Marina Saigon complex.
10	The Landmark 2		Bình Thạnh	184,5	52 (+3 basements)	2017	Part of The Landmark subdivision, Vinhomes Central Park (Saigon Newport) urban area. Topping out in October 2016. It is the second tallest apartment building in Ho Chi Minh City.
11	Aqua 1		District 1, Ho Chi Minh City	184,5	50 (+3 Basements)	2018	Belongs to The Aqua subdivision, Vinhomes Golden River (Ba Son) urban area. Roof topping in July 2017.
12	Aqua 2		District 1, Ho Chi Minh City	184,5	50 (+3 Basements)	2018	Belongs to The Aqua subdivision, Vinhomes Golden River (Ba Son) urban area. Roof topping in July 2017.
13	Luxury 6		District 1, Ho Chi Minh City	184,5	50 (+3 Basements)	2018	Belongs to The Luxury subdivision, Vinhomes Golden River (Ba Son) urban area.
14	The Park 6		Bình Thạnh	184	51 (+3 Basements)	2017	Belongs to The Park subdivision, Vinhomes Central Park urban area. Roof topping in July 2016.
15	Lake Tower		District 1, Ho Chi Minh City	182	47 (+3 Basements)	2023	Initially named Lux 5 and belongs to the Vinhomes Golden River until it belongs to the Grand Marina Saigon project. Topping out on May 19, 2022.
16	The Landmark 3		Bình Thạnh	180	50 (+2 Basements)	2017	Belongs to The Landmark subdivision, Vinhomes Central Park urban area. Topping out in November 2016.
17	The Landmark 4		Bình Thạnh	180	50 (+2 Basements)	2017	The only twin buildings belong to The Landmark subdivision, Vinhomes Central Park urban area. Roof topping in May 2016.
18	The Landmark Plus		Bình Thạnh	180	50 (+3 Basements)	2018	Belongs to Vinhomes Central Park urban area. Roof topping in June 2017.
19	The Landmark 5		Bình Thạnh	178	48 (+2 Basements)	2017	Belongs to The Landmark subdivision, Vinhomes Central Park urban area. Roof topping in May 2016.
20	The Landmark 1	thế=	Bình Thạnh	175,5	47 (+3 Basements)	2017	Belongs to The Landmark subdivision, Vinhomes Central Park urban area. Roof topping in September 2016.
21	The Park 5	thế=	Bình Thạnh	175,5	47 (+3 Basements)	2017	Belongs to The Park subdivision, Vinhomes Central Park urban area.
22	The Park 7		Bình Thạnh	175	47 (+3 Basements)	2017	Belongs to The Park subdivision, Vinhomes Central Park urban area.
23	The Central 3	thế=	Bình Thạnh	168,5	47 (+3 Basements)	2016	Belongs to The Central subdivision, Vinhomes Central Park urban area.
24	The Central 2		Bình Thạnh	168	47 (+3 Basements)	2016	Belongs to The Central subdivision, Vinhomes Central Park urban area.
25	Lumière Riverside West		Thủ Đức	165	44 (+2 Basements)	2023	It is the tallest building in Thu Duc city, topping out on March 2, 2023.
26	Saigon Times Square		District 1, Ho Chi Minh City	164,9	40 (+3 Basements)	2012	The project is a complex consisting of two twin towers of equal height and 21.25m apart.
27	Golden House		Bình Thạnh	164,7	50 (+2 Basements)	2020	Belongs to the Sunwah Pearl project.
28	White House		Bình Thạnh	164,7	50 (+2 Basements)	2020	Belongs to the Sunwah Pearl project.
29	The Park 4		Bình Thạnh	162	43 (+3 Basements)	2018	Belongs to The Park subdivision, Vinhomes Central Park urban area.
30	The Landmark 6		Bình Thạnh	161	45 (+3 Basements)	2017	Belongs to The Landmark subdivision, Vinhomes Central Park urban area. Roof topping in May 2016.
31	Lancaster Legacy A		District 1, Ho Chi Minh City	160	38 (+5 Basements)		
32	Lancaster Legacy B		District 1, Ho Chi Minh City	160	38 (+5 Basements)		
33	Lancaster Legacy C		District 1, Ho Chi Minh City	160	38 (+5 Basements)		
34	Aqua 3		District 1, Ho Chi Minh City	157,3	42 (+3 Basements)	2018	Belongs to The Aqua subdivision, Vinhomes Golden River urban area.
35	Victory Tower		District 7, Ho Chi Minh City	155	33 (+3 Basements)	2011	Formerly named Petroland Tower. It is the tallest building District 7.
36	Hilton Saigon Hotel		District 1, Ho Chi Minh City	154	34 (+5 Basements)	2024	The tallest hotel in Ho Chi Minh City.
37	Phú Hoàng Anh 1C		Nhà Bè district	153,3	35 (+1 Basements)	2012	Belongs to Phu Hoang Anh 1 project. It is the tallest building in Nhà Bè district.
38	Phú Hoàng Anh 1D		Nhà Bè district	153,3	35 (+1 Basement)	2012	Belongs to Phu Hoang Anh 1 project. It is the tallest building in Nhà Bè district.
39	Pearl Plaza	thế=	Bình Thạnh	152,8	32 (+4 Basement)	2015	Topping out in December 2014. It is the tallest office building in Bình Thạnh.
40	The Park 2	thế=	Bình Thạnh	152,4	40 (+3 Basement)	2017	Belongs to The Park subdivision, Vinhomes Central Park urban area.
41	The Park 3	thế=	Bình Thạnh	151	42 (+3 Basement)	2017	Belongs to The Park subdivision, Vinhomes Central Park urban area.
42	The View Riviera Point T6		District 7, Ho Chi Minh City	150,7	42 (+1 Basement)	2019	Belongs to The View subdivision of Riviera Point. Roof topping in June 2018.
43	The View Riviera Point T7		District 7, Ho Chi Minh City	150,7	42 (+1 Basement)	2019	Belongs to The View subdivision of Riviera Point. Roof topping in June 2018.
44	The View Riviera Point T8		District 7, Ho Chi Minh City	150,7	42 (+1 Basement)	2019	Belongs to The View subdivision of Riviera Point. Roof topping in June 2018.
45	Silver House	thế=	Bình Thạnh	148,4	45 (+2 Basement)	2020	Belongs to the Sunwah Pearl project.
46	Riviera Point T3		District 7, Ho Chi Minh City	147	41	2014	Thuộc dự án Riviera Point
47	Riviera Point T4		District 7, Ho Chi Minh City	147	41	2014	Thuộc dự án Riviera Point
48	Riviera Point T5		District 7, Ho Chi Minh City	147	41	2014	Thuộc dự án Riviera Point
49	Masteri Thảo Điền T5		Thủ Đức	146,9	44 (+1 Basement)	2017	Thuộc dự án Masteri Thảo Điền
50	Saigon Trade Center		District 1, Ho Chi Minh City	145	33 (+3 Basement)	1997	The tallest building in Vietnam from 1997 until 2010 when Bitexco Financial Tower was completed. The height to the highest point is 160m.
51	Sunshine Sky City S4		District 7, Ho Chi Minh City	144,5	38	2025	Topped out May 11, 2024
52	Cantavil Premier 1	thế=	Thủ Đức	144	36 (+2 Basement)	2013	Used to be the tallest twin towers in Ho Chi Minh City until Lumière Riverside surpassed them.
53	Cantavil Premier 2	thế=	Thủ Đức	144	36 (+2 Basement)	2013	Used to be the tallest twin towers in Ho Chi Minh City until Lumière Riverside surpassed them.
54	Masteri Thảo Điền T3		Thủ Đức	144	43 (+2 Basement)	2016	Thuộc dự án Masteri Thảo Điền.
55	Masteri Thảo Điền T4		Thủ Đức	144	43 (+2 Basement)	2016	Thuộc dự án Masteri Thảo Điền.
56	RIO Building		Thủ Đức	143	42 (+2 Basement)	2019	Thuộc dự án Masteri An Phú
57	SOL Building		Thủ Đức	143	42 (+2 Basement)	2019	Thuộc dự án Masteri An Phú
58	Lumière Riverside East		Thủ Đức	143	38 (+2 Basement)	2023	Cất nóc vào ngày 2 tháng 3 năm 2023.
59	Sunrise CityView B		District 7, Ho Chi Minh City	143	37 (+3 Basement)	2019	Thuộc dự án Sunrise CityView.
60	The Nexus 2		District 1, Ho Chi Minh City	141	36 (+5 Basement)	2023	Cất nóc vào ngày 5 tháng 4 năm 2023.
61	Opal Tower		Bình Thạnh	140,5	41 (+4 Basement)	2019	Phase 3 of Saigon Pearl. The second tallest office building in Bình Thạnh. Topping out in March 2019.
62	The Aspen		Thủ Đức	140	42 (+1 Basement)	2018	Part of Gateway Thảo Điền
63	The Grand Manhattan B1	The Grand Manhattan, cô giang, quận 1, thành phố hồ chí minh	District 1, Ho Chi Minh City	140	39	2025	Topped out January 16, 2024
64	The Grand Manhattan B2	The Grand Manhattan, cô giang, quận 1, thành phố hồ chí minh	District 1, Ho Chi Minh City	140	39	2025	Topped out January 16, 2024
65	South Tower V5	thế=	District 7, Ho Chi Minh City	139	35 (+2 Basement)	2012	Thuộc phân khu South Towers của khu chung cư Sunrise City.
66	South Tower V6	thế=	District 7, Ho Chi Minh City	139	35 (+2 Basement)	2012	Thuộc phân khu South Towers của khu chung cư Sunrise City.
67	Central Tower W1		District 7, Ho Chi Minh City	139	35 (+2 Basement)	2015	Thuộc phân khu Central Towers của khu chung cư Sunrise City.
68	Central Tower W4		District 7, Ho Chi Minh City	139	35 (+2 Basement)	2015	Thuộc phân khu Central Towers của khu chung cư Sunrise City.
69	North Tower X1		District 7, Ho Chi Minh City	139	35 (+1 Basement)	2016	Thuộc phân khu North Towers của khu chung cư Sunrise City.
70	North Tower X2		District 7, Ho Chi Minh City	139	35 (+1 Basement)	2016	Thuộc phân khu North Towers của khu chung cư Sunrise City.
71	Sunrise CityView A	Sunrise City View in Tân Hưng	District 7, Ho Chi Minh City	139	36 (+3 Basement)	2019	Thuộc dự án Sunrise CityView.
72	Golden Plaza Residence	Golden Plaza Residence in District 5, previously Cinco	District 5, Ho Chi Minh City	138,5	35 (+2 Basement)	2014	It is the tallest building District 5, Ho Chi Minh City.
73	Sunshine Sky City S2		District 7, Ho Chi Minh City	137,5	36	2025	Topped out July 15, 2024
74	Sunshine Sky City S3		District 7, Ho Chi Minh City	137,5	36	2025	Topped out July 15, 2024
75	The Central 1		Bình Thạnh	137,4	38 (+3 Basement)	2016	Thuộc phân khu The Central, khu đô thị Vinhomes Central Park. Cất nóc tháng 4 năm 2016.
76	The Park 1		Bình Thạnh	137,4	38 (+3 Basement)	2016	Thuộc phân khu The Park, khu đô thị Vinhomes Central Park
77	Hoàng Anh Thanh Bình B		District 7, Ho Chi Minh City	136	40 (+2 Basement)	2016	Belongs to Hoang Anh Thanh Binh apartment building
78	Aqua 4		District 1, Ho Chi Minh City	135,9	36 (+3 Basement)	2018	Thuộc phân khu The Aqua, khu đô thị Vinhomes Golden River.
79	Saigon Pearl Ruby	thế=	Bình Thạnh	135	38 (+1 Basement)	2009	Phase 1 of Saigon Pearl
80	Saigon Pearl Sapphire	thế=	Bình Thạnh	135	38 (+1 Basement)	2009	Phase 1 of Saigon Pearl
81	Saigon Pearl Topaz	thế=	Bình Thạnh	135	38 (+1 Basement)	2009	Phase 1 of Saigon Pearl
82	Masteri Thảo Điền T1	thế=	Thủ Đức	135	40 (+2 Basement)	2016	Thuộc dự án Masteri Thảo Điền
83	Masteri Thảo Điền T2	thế=	Thủ Đức	135	40 (+2 Basement)	2016	Thuộc dự án Masteri Thảo Điền
84	The Tropical BS8		Thủ Đức	134,5	39	2024	
85	The Tropical BS10		Thủ Đức	134,5	39	2024	
86	Masteri Riviera E		Thủ Đức	133	39 (+2 Basement)	2022	Belongs to the Masteri Center Point project. Roof topping June 2022.
87	Topaz Elite - Dragon 1		District 8, Ho Chi Minh City	132,1	33 (+1 Basement)	2021	Belongs to the Topaz Elite project. It is the tallest building District 8, Ho Chi Minh City.
88	Topaz Elite - Dragon 2		District 8, Ho Chi Minh City	132,1	33 (+1 Basement)	2021	Belongs to the Topaz Elite project. It is the tallest building District 8, Ho Chi Minh City.
89	The Oasis BS16		Thủ Đức	131,5	39 (+2 Basement)	2023	Belongs to the Beverly Solari subdivision in the Vinhomes Grand Park complex
90	Central Tower W2		District 7, Ho Chi Minh City	130,9	34 (+2 Basement)	2012	Belongs to the Central Towers subdivision of the Sunrise City apartment complex.
92	Central Tower W3		District 7, Ho Chi Minh City	130,9	34 (+2 Basement)	2012	Belongs to the Central Towers subdivision of the Sunrise City apartment complex.
93	South Tower V1		District 7, Ho Chi Minh City	130,9	31 (+2 Basement)	2012	Belongs to the South Towers subdivision of the Sunrise City apartment complex.
94	South Tower V2		District 7, Ho Chi Minh City	130,9	31 (+2 Basement)	2012	Belongs to the South Towers subdivision of the Sunrise City apartment complex.
95	South Tower V3		District 7, Ho Chi Minh City	130,9	31 (+2 Basement)	2012	Belongs to the South Towers subdivision of the Sunrise City apartment complex.
96	South Tower V4		District 7, Ho Chi Minh City	130,9	31 (+2 Basement)	2012	Belongs to the South Towers subdivision of the Sunrise City apartment complex.
97	Sunshine Diamond River B		District 7, Ho Chi Minh City	131	38 (+2 Basement)	2023	Thuộc dự án Sunshine Diamond River. Cất nóc tháng 3 năm 2020 nhưng vẫn đang thi công nội thất, chưa đưa vào sử dụng
98	Sunshine Diamond River C		District 7, Ho Chi Minh City	131	38 (+2 Basement)	2023	Thuộc dự án Sunshine Diamond River. Cất nóc vào năm 2015 nhưng vẫn đang thi công nội thất, chưa đưa vào sử dụng
99	Linden Residences 1A	thế=	Thủ Đức	129,5	34 (+2 Basement)	2021	Tòa nhà nằm trong phân khu MU4 của dự án Empire City
100	Linden Residences 2A	thế=	Thủ Đức	129,5	34 (+2 Basement)	2021	Tòa nhà nằm trong phân khu MU4 của dự án Empire City
101	The Beverly BE1		Thủ Đức	127,3	34	2024	The Beverly section is part of Vinhomes Grand Park (Phước Thiện) project.
102	The Beverly BE2		Thủ Đức	127,3	34	2024	The Beverly section is part of Vinhomes Grand Park (Phước Thiện) project.
103	The Beverly BE3		Thủ Đức	127,3	34	2024	The Beverly section is part of Vinhomes Grand Park (Phước Thiện) project.
104	The Zeit River T2	The Zeit River T2 Thủ Thiêm	Thủ Đức	128	32 (+2 Basement)	2025	
105	City Garden Boulevard	City Garden Boulevard in 2015	Bình Thạnh	127	30 (+1 Basement)	2012	Phase 1 of the City Garden project.
106	City Garden Promennade		Bình Thạnh	127	30 (+2 Basement)	2017	Phase 2 of the City Garden project.
107	Phú Hoàng Anh 1B		Nhà Bè	126	30 (+1 Basement)	2012	Belongs to Phú Hoàng Anh 1 project.
108	Hoàng Anh Thanh Bình A		District 7, Ho Chi Minh City	126	37 (+2 Basement)	2016	Belongs to Hoàng Anh Thanh Bình apartment building
109	Hoàng Anh Thanh Bình C		District 7, Ho Chi Minh City	126	37 (+2 Basement)	2016	Belongs to Hoàng Anh Thanh Bình apartment building
110	WhiskyCognac Building		Bình Thạnh	125,8	26 (+4 Basement)	2020	Originally named V_Ikon Tower. Current name is VIET Tower or alternatively called Saigon Co.op Tower, the height of the building to the roof (without spire) of the building is 99 meters.
111	La Casa		District 7	124,9	35	2013	Belongs to the La Casa complex
112	An Gia Skyline		District 7	124,9	35 (+1 Basement)	2017	Belongs to the La Casa complex
113	River Panorama 1		District 7	124,9	35 (+2 Basement)	2020	Belongs to the La Casa complex
114	River Panorama 2		District 7	124,9	35 (+2 Basement)	2020	Belongs to the La Casa complex
115	Sky 89		District 7	124,9	35 (+2 Basement)	2021	Belongs to the La Casa complex
116	Lim Tower 1	Lim Tower 1 at the middle	District 1, Ho Chi Minh City	124,5	34 (+2 Basement)	2013	
117	The Pegasuite		District 8	124,5	36 (+1 Basement)	2019	
118	Saigon Royal Residences		District 4	123	35 (+4 Basement)	2019	The tallest building District 4
119	Eco Green Saigon HR1A		District 7, Ho Chi Minh City	123	36 (+2 Basement)	2020	Belonging to the Eco Green Saigon project
120	Eco Green Saigon HR1B		District 7	123	36 (+2 Basement)	2020	Belonging to the Eco Green Saigon project
121	Eco Green Saigon HR2A		District 7	123	36 (+2 Basement)	2020	Belonging to the Eco Green Saigon project
122	Eco Green Saigon HR2B		District 7, Ho Chi Minh City	123	36 (+2 Basement)	2020	Belonging to the Eco Green Saigon project
123	The Western Capital B2		District 6, Ho Chi Minh City	122,2	36 (+2 Basement)	2022	Belongs to The Western Capital project. It is the tallest building District 6, Ho Chi Minh City.
124	Ascott Waterfront Saigon		District 1, Ho Chi Minh City	122	27 (+4 Basement)	2016	
125	Q7 Saigon Riverside Mercury		District 7, Ho Chi Minh City	120,9	34 (+1 Basement)	2022	Belongs to the Q7 Saigon Riverside Complex project
126	Q7 Saigon Riverside Saturn		District 7, Ho Chi Minh City	120,9	34 (+1 Basement)	2022	Belongs to the Q7 Saigon Riverside Complex project
127	Q7 Saigon Riverside Uranus		District 7, Ho Chi Minh City	120,9	34 (+1 Basement)	2022	Belongs to the Q7 Saigon Riverside Complex project
128	Q7 Saigon Riverside Venus		District 7, Ho Chi Minh City	120,9	34 (+1 Basement)	2022	Belongs to the Q7 Saigon Riverside Complex project
129	Soho Residence		District 1, Ho Chi Minh City	120,5	36	2021	Roof topping September 2020.
130	The Beverly BE5		Thủ Đức	120,4	32	2024	Belong to The Beverly section of Vinhomes Grand Park
131	The Beverly BE6		Thủ Đức	120,4	32	2024	Belong to The Beverly section of Vinhomes Grand Park
132	The Beverly BE7		Thủ Đức	120,4	32	2024	Belong to The Beverly section of Vinhomes Grand Park
133	Hùng Vương Plaza A		District 5, Ho Chi Minh City	120	30 (+4 Basement)	2008	
134	Hùng Vương Plaza B		District 5, Ho Chi Minh City	120	30 (+4 Basement)	2008	
135	The Tresor TS1		District 4, Ho Chi Minh City	120	34 (+4 Basement)	2014	
136	The Madison		Thủ Đức	120	36 (+1 Basement)	2018	Belongs to the Gateway Thảo Điền project
137	The Hallmark	thế=	Thủ Đức	120	30 (+3 Basement)	2023	The roof has been roofed and glass installation is in progress
138	Vista Verde Lotus	thế=	Thủ Đức	119	35	2018	Belongs to the Vista Verde project
139	Vista Verde Orchid	thế=	Thủ Đức	119	35	2018	Belongs to the Vista Verde project
140	Vista Verde T1	thế=	Thủ Đức	119	35	2018	Belongs to the Vista Verde project
141	Vista Verde T2	thế=	Thủ Đức	119	35	2018	Belongs to the Vista Verde project
142	Lavida Plus A		District 7, Ho Chi Minh City	119	33 (+1 Basement)	2019	Topping out in March 2019.
143	Thisofic Tower		Thủ Đức	119	20	2019	Originally named as Sofic. It is the first office and mixed-use building to be completed in Sala City development and Thủ Thiêm new urban area
144	S1.02 The Rainbow		Thủ Đức	119	35 (+2 Basement)	2020	Thuộc khu S1 trong phân khu The Rainbow của dự án Vinhomes Grand Park.
145	S1.06 The Rainbow		Thủ Đức	119	35 (+2 Basement)	2020	Thuộc khu S1 trong phân khu The Rainbow của dự án Vinhomes Grand Park.
146	S1.07 The Rainbow		Thủ Đức	119	35 (+2 Basement)	2020	Thuộc khu S1 trong phân khu The Rainbow của dự án Vinhomes Grand Park.
147	S2.02 The Rainbow		Thủ Đức	119	35 (+2 Basement)	2020	Belongs to area S2 in The Rainbow subdivision of Vinhomes Grand Park project.
148	S2.05 The Rainbow		Thủ Đức	119	35 (+2 Basement)	2020	Belongs to area S2 in The Rainbow subdivision of Vinhomes Grand Park project.
149	S5.01 The Rainbow		Thủ Đức	119	35 (+2 Basement)	2020	Located in area S5 in The Rainbow subdivision of Vinhomes Grand Park project.
150	S5.03 The Rainbow		Thủ Đức	119	35 (+2 Basement)	2020	Located in area S5 in The Rainbow subdivision of Vinhomes Grand Park project.
151	The MarQ	thế=	District 1, Ho Chi Minh City	118,4	26	2022	
152	Phú Hoàng Anh 1A		Nhà Bè	118	28 (+1 Basement)	2012	Belongs to Phu Hoàng Anh 1 project.
153	The River Gate A	thế=	District 4, Ho Chi Minh City	118	33 (+4 tầng hầm)	2017	Belongs to The RiverGate project.
154	Tilia Residences 1A	thế=	Thủ Đức	116,6	30	2020	The building is located in the MU7 subdivision of the Empire City project
155	Tilia Residences 1C	thế=	Thủ Đức	116,6	30	2020	The building is located in the MU7 subdivision of the Empire City project
156	City Garden Crescent		Bình Thạnh	116,1	28 (+2 Basement)	2017	Phase 2 of the City Garden project.
157	WORC@Q2		Thủ Đức	116,1	32 (+1 Basement)	2021	Roof topping in July 2020.
158	Estella Heights T3		Thủ Đức	116	34 (+2 Basement)	2018	Giai đoạn 2 của dự án Estalla Heights
159	Estella Heights T4		Thủ Đức	116	34 (+2 Basement)	2018	Giai đoạn 2 của dự án Estalla Heights
160	Feliz en Vista Altaz		Thủ Đức	116	34 (+1 Basement)	2020	Belongs to the Feliz en Vista project
161	Feliz en Vista Berdaz		Thủ Đức	116	34 (+1 Basement)	2020	Belongs to the Feliz en Vista project
162	Feliz en Vista Cruz		Thủ Đức	116	34 (+1 Basement)	2020	Belongs to the Feliz en Vista project
163	The Western Capital B3		District 6, Ho Chi Minh City	115,8	34 (+2 Basement)	2022	Belongs to The Western project
164	Masteri Riviera C		Thủ Đức	115,6	34 (+2 Basement)	2022	Belongs to the Masteri Center Point project. Roof topping June 2022.
165	Masteri Riviera D		Thủ Đức	115,6	34 (+2 Basement)	2022	Belongs to the Masteri Center Point project. Roof topping June 2022.
166	The Oasis BS15		Thủ Đức	115,5	34 (+2 Basement)	2023	Belongs to the Beverly Solari subdivision in the Vinhomes Grand Park complex
167	Palm Heights T1	thế=	Thủ Đức	115,2	35 (+1 Basements)	2019	Belongs to the Palm City project. Roof topping in July 2018.
168	Palm Heights T2	thế=	Thủ Đức	115,2	35 (+1 Basements)	2019	Belongs to the Palm City project. Roof topping in July 2018.
168	Palm Heights T3	thế=	Thủ Đức	115,2	35 (+1 Basements)	2019	Belongs to the Palm City project. Roof topping in July 2018.
169	Vincom Center Tower A		District 1, Ho Chi Minh City	115	28 (+6 Basements)	2010	
170	Vincom Center Tower B		District 1, Ho Chi Minh City	115	28 (+6 Basements)	2010	
171	Lucky Palace		District 6, Ho Chi Minh City	114	33 (+3 Basements)	2018	
172	Masteri Millennium A		District 4, Ho Chi Minh City	113,2	34 (+3 Basements)	2018	Belongs to the Masteri Millennium project.
173	Masteri Millennium B		District 4, Ho Chi Minh City	113,2	34 (+3 Basements)	2018	Belongs to the Masteri Millennium project.
174	HIU Building		Bình Thạnh	113	26 (+2 Basements)	2017	
175	Diamond Island Bahamas	thế=	Thủ Đức	113	29 (+2 Basements)	2018	Belongs to the Diamond Island project
176	Diamond Island Bora Bora	thế=	Thủ Đức	113	29 (+2 Basements)	2018	Belongs to the Diamond Island project
177	Diamond Island Maldives		Thủ Đức	113	29 (+2 Basements)	2018	Belongs to the Diamond Island project
178	Sonatus Building		District 1, Ho Chi Minh City	113	26 (+4 Basements)	2019	
179	Topaz Elite - Phoenix 1		District 8, Ho Chi Minh City	112,4	33 (+1 Basements)	2021	Belongs to the Topaz Elite project
180	Topaz Elite - Phoenix 2		District 8, Ho Chi Minh City	112,4	33 (+1 Basements)	2021	Belongs to the Topaz Elite project
181	Kingdom 101 -A	thế=	District 10, Ho Chi Minh City	112,2	30 (+2 Basements)	2020	Part of Kingdom 101 To Hien Thanh project and C30 (Bắc Hải, Lê Thị Riêng station) Transit-oriented development. Is the tallest building District 10, Ho Chi Minh City
182	Kingdom 101 B	thế=	District 10, Ho Chi Minh City	112,2	30 (+2 Basements)	2020	Part of Kingdom 101 To Hien Thanh project and C30 (Bắc Hải, Lê Thị Riêng station) Transit-oriented development. Is the tallest building District 10, Ho Chi Minh City
183	Kingdom 101 C	thế=	District 10, Ho Chi Minh City	112,2	30 (+2 Basements)	2020	Part of Kingdom 101 To Hien Thanh project and C30 (Bắc Hải, Lê Thị Riêng station) Transit-oriented development. Is the tallest building District 10, Ho Chi Minh City
184	The EverRich 1A	thế=	District 11, Ho Chi Minh City	112	25 (+2 Basements)	2009	Is the tallest building District 11, Ho Chi Minh City
185	The EverRich 1B		District 11, Ho Chi Minh City	112	25 (+2 Basements)	2009	Is the tallest building District 11, Ho Chi Minh City
186	Thảo Điền Pearl A		Thủ Đức	112	33 (+2 Basements)	2013	
187	Thảo Điền Pearl B		Thủ Đức	112	33 (+2 Basements)	2013	
188	The Gold View A		District 4	112	33 (+2 Basements)	2017	Belongs to The Gold View project.
189	Estella Heights T1		Thủ Đức	112	33 (+2 Basements)	2018	Phase 1 of the Estalla Heights project
190	Estella Heights T2		Thủ Đức	112	33 (+2 Basements)	2018	Phase 1 of the Estalla Heights project
191	Remax Plaza		District 6, Ho Chi Minh City	112	28 (+2 Basements)	2019	The old names are Richland Emerald and Goldland Binh Tay. The building was started in 2008 but in 2011, construction stopped until 2017.
192	The Garden Residence A	thế=	District 5, Ho Chi Minh City	110	33	1999	Previously named Thuan Kieu Plaza. The project was restored and opened in 2017 with The Garden Mall and in 2018 with The Garden Residence. This building was also used as a field hospital to treat COVID-19 in 2021.
193	The Garden Residence B	thế=	District 5, Ho Chi Minh City	110	33	1999	Previously named Thuan Kieu Plaza. The project was restored and opened in 2017 with The Garden Mall and in 2018 with The Garden Residence. This building was also used as a field hospital to treat COVID-19 in 2021.
194	The Garden Residence C	thế=	District 5, Ho Chi Minh City	110	33	1999	Previously named Thuan Kieu Plaza. The project was restored and opened in 2017 with The Garden Mall and in 2018 with The Garden Residence. This building was also used as a field hospital to treat COVID-19 in 2021.
195	JW Marriott Saigon Hotel & Suites - Residential Tower		District 1, Ho Chi Minh City	110	32 (+2 Basements)	2009	Located in the mPlaza Saigon complex, and formerly known as the InterContinental Saigon Hotel
196	The Vista Building		Thủ Đức	110	28 (+2 Basements)	2011	Belongs to The Vista An Phu project
197	The Vista T1	thế=	Thủ Đức	110	28 (+2 Basements)	2011	Belongs to The Vista An Phu project
198	The Vista T2	thế=	Thủ Đức	110	28 (+2 Basements)	2011	Belongs to The Vista An Phu project
199	The Vista T3	thế=	Thủ Đức	110	28 (+2 Basements)	2011	Belongs to The Vista An Phu project
200	The Vista T4	thế=	Thủ Đức	110	28 (+2 Basements)	2011	Belongs to The Vista An Phu project
201	The Vista T5	thế=	Thủ Đức	110	28 (+2 Basements)	2011	Belongs to The Vista An Phu project
202	Terra Royal / La Vela Saigon		District 3, Ho Chi Minh City	110	28 (+2 Basements)	2019	It is the tallest building in District 3, Ho Chi Minh City, originally known as Intresco Plaza. Terra Royal is for the residences block and La Vela Saigon for hotel block.
203	Define		Thủ Đức	110	26 (+1 Basements)	2023	Topping out on December 21, 2022.

=== Tallest building by area ===
Area	Building	Height (m)	Number of floors	Complete
Bình Thạnh	Landmark 81	461,2	81	2018
District 1	Bitexco Financial Tower	262,5	68	2010
Thủ Đức	Lumière Riverside West	165	44	2023
District 7, Ho Chi Minh City	Victory Tower	155	33	2011
Nhà Bè	Phú Hoàng Anh 1C, D	153,3	35	2012
District 5, Ho Chi Minh City	Golden Plaza Residence	138,5	35	2014
District 8, Ho Chi Minh City	Topaz Elite Dragon	132,1	33	2021
District 4, Ho Chi Minh City	Saigon Royal Residence 1	123	35	2019
District 8, Ho Chi Minh City	The Western Capital B2	122,2	36	2022
District 10, Ho Chi Minh City	Kingdom 101	112,2	30	2020
District 11, Ho Chi Minh City	The Everrich 1	112	25	2010
District 3, Ho Chi Minh City	Terra Royal / La Vela Saigon	110	28	2019
Bình Chánh	The Easter City	102	30	2015
Bình Tân	AIO City	95,2	28	2023
Tân Phú	Carillon 7	90	27	2019
Tân Bình	Park Legend	83,9	24	2021
Phú Nhuận	Orchard Parkview	82	24	2018
District 12, Ho Chi Minh City	Hưng Ngân Garden	75	22	2016
Hóc Môn	HQC Hóc Môn	61	18	2015
Gò Vấp	I-Home A	61	18	2017
Củ Chi	Sơn Lộc Parish Church	41	--	2015
Cần Giờ	Bình Khánh Caodaism Temple	30	--	2015

== Uncompleted ==
=== Under construction ===
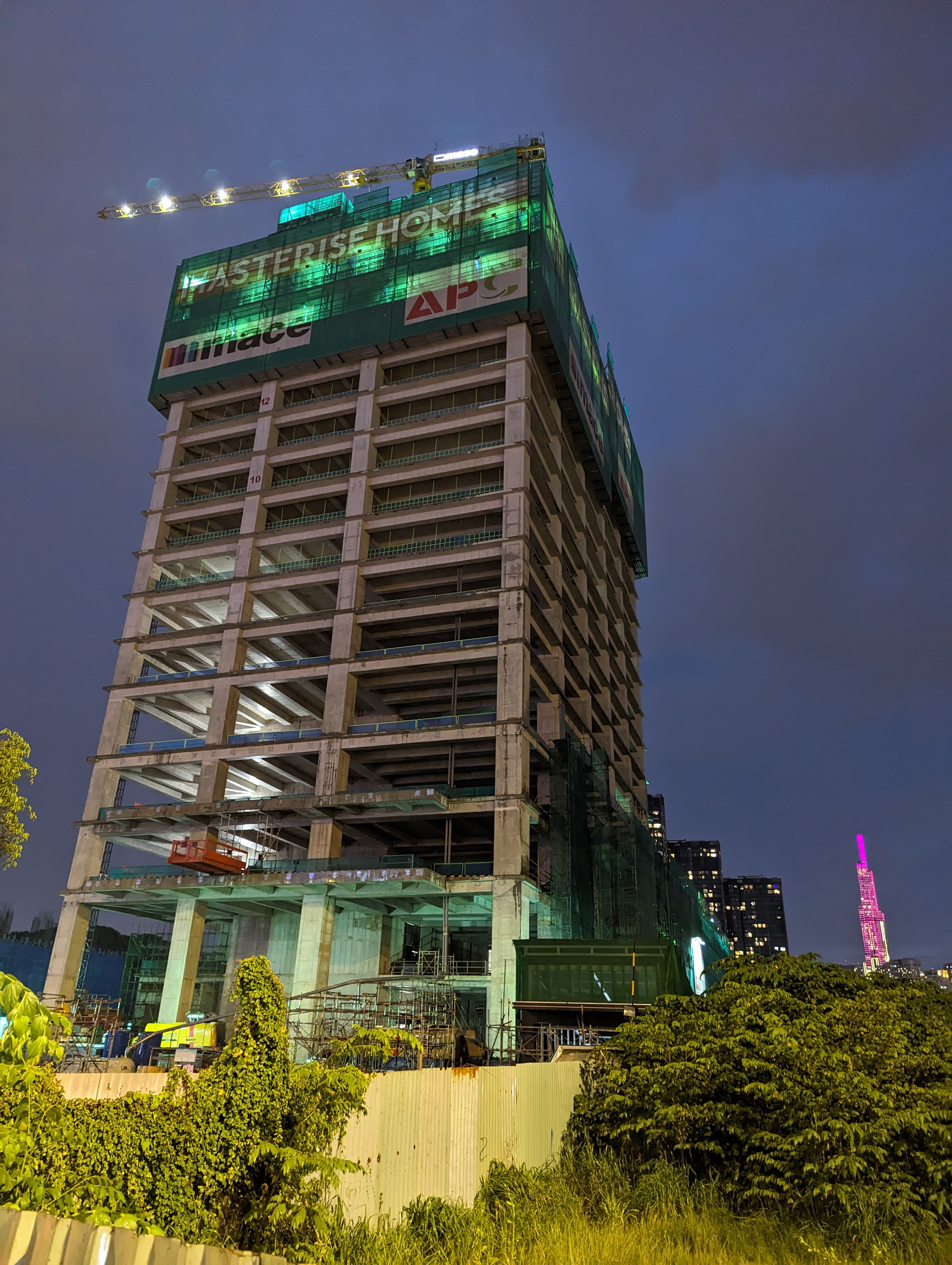
July 2023 progress of Marina Central Tower

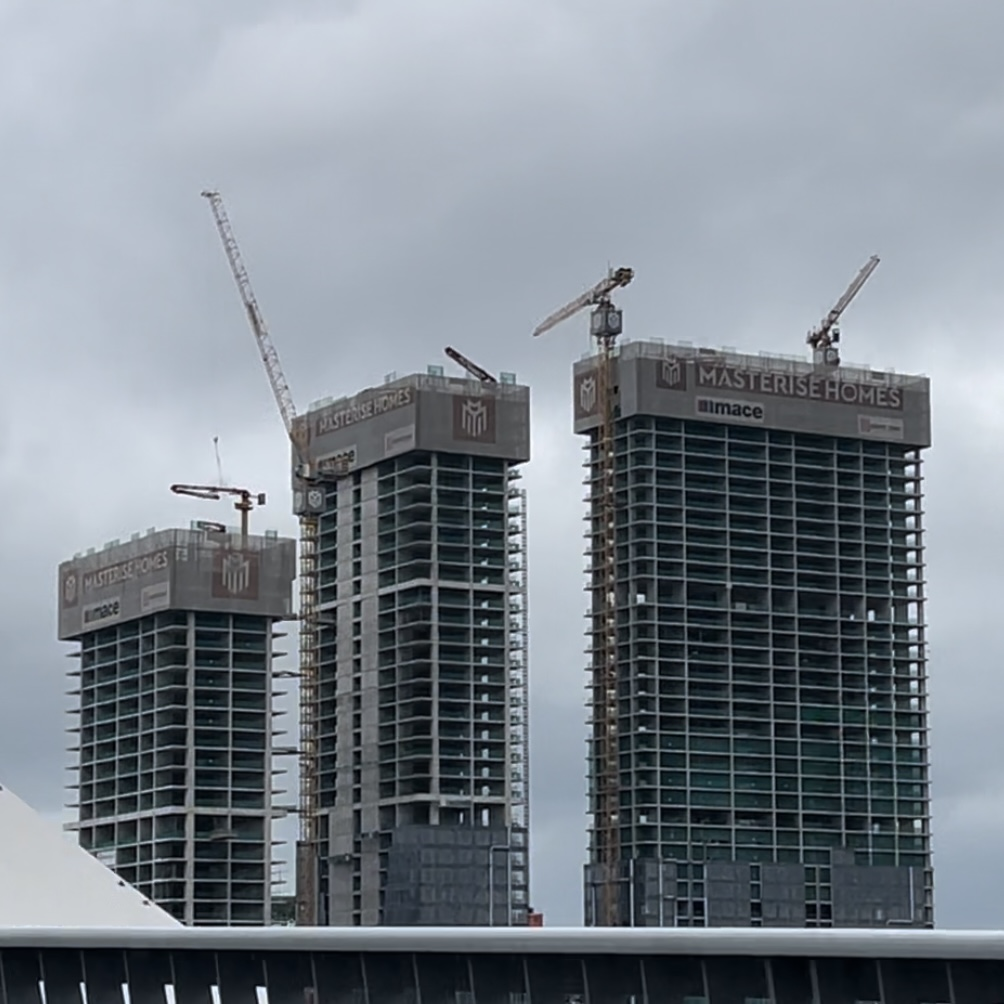
Grand Marina Saigon's September 2023 progress

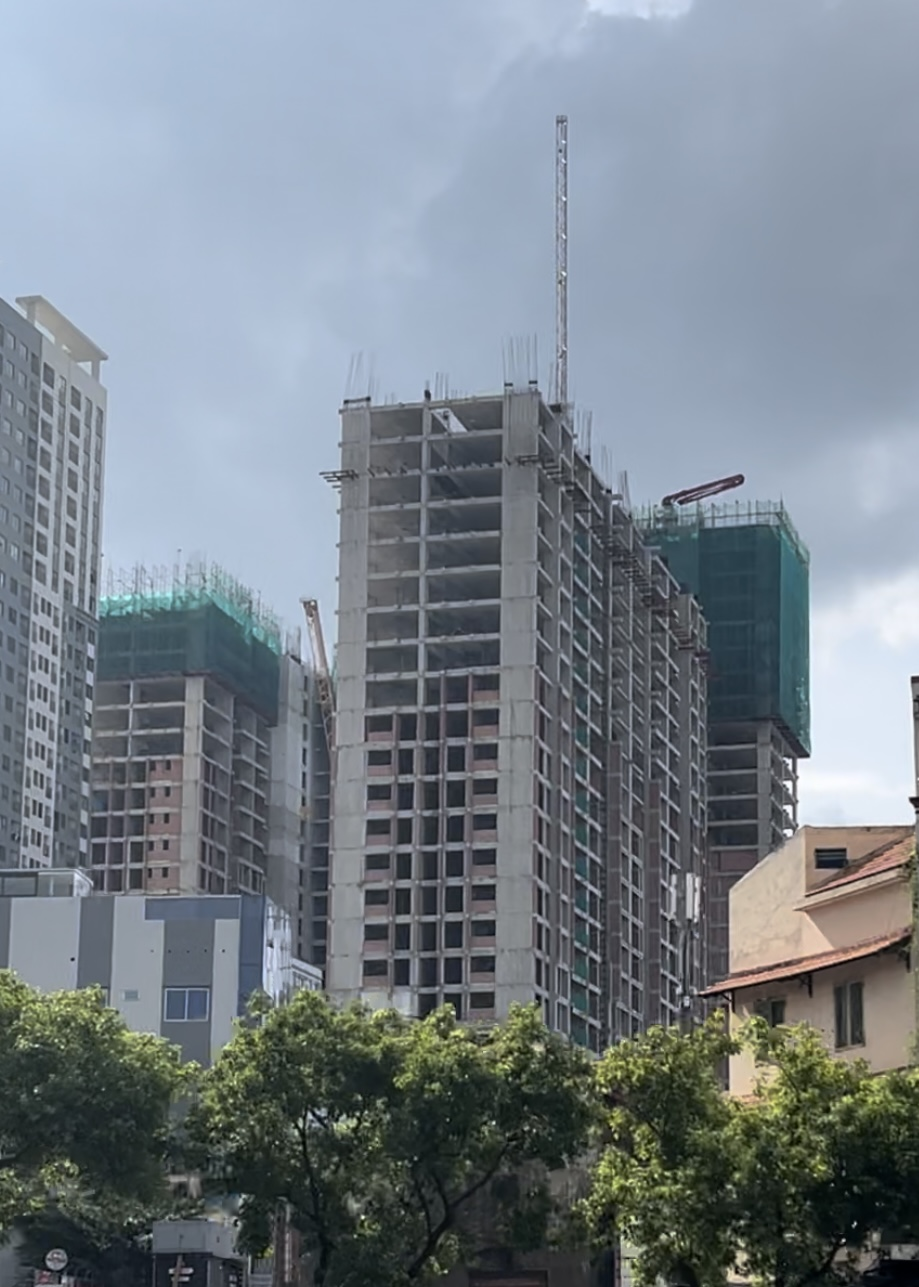
The Grand Manhattan's September 2023 progress

The list includes buildings under construction or not yet topped out with height of 100m or more.

Class	Building	Location	Height	Number of floors	Expected to be completed	Notes
1	Marina Central Tower	District 1, Ho Chi Minh City	240	55	2024	It will be the 3rd tallest building in Ho Chi Minh City when completed
2	Cove Tower	District 1, Ho Chi Minh City	175	47	2024	The second subdivision belongs to Grand Marina Saigon
3	Sea Tower	District 1, Ho Chi Minh City	175	47	2024	The second subdivision belongs to Grand Marina Saigon
4	Lagoon Tower	District 1, Ho Chi Minh City	167	45	2024	The second subdivision belongs to Grand Marina Saigon
5	Lancaster Legacy A	District 1, Ho Chi Minh City	160	38	2024	Previously Citi Plaza
6	Lancaster Legacy B	District 1, Ho Chi Minh City	160	38	2024	Previously Citi Plaza
7	Lancaster Legacy C	District 1, Ho Chi Minh City	160	38	2024	Previously Citi Plaza
8	Vinhomes Grand Park Office Tower	Thủ Đức	153	45	-	
9	Sunshine Sky City S4	District 7, Ho Chi Minh City	144,5	38	2023	
10	The Infiniti Riviera Point T10	District 7, Ho Chi Minh City	143	40	2024	
11	The Infiniti Riviera Point T11	District 7, Ho Chi Minh City	143	40	2024	
12	The Grand Manhattan SGM 1	District 1, Ho Chi Minh City	140	39	2024	
13	The Grand Manhattan SGM 2	District 1, Ho Chi Minh City	140	39	2024	
14	The Grand Manhattan SGM 3	District 1, Ho Chi Minh City	140	39	2024	
15	The Infiniti Riviera Point T9	District 7, Ho Chi Minh City	140	39	2024	
16	The Infiniti Riviera Point T12	District 7, Ho Chi Minh City	140	39	2024	
17	Sunshine Sky City S2	District 7, Ho Chi Minh City	137,5	36	2023	
18	Sunshine Sky City S3	District 7, Ho Chi Minh City	137,5	36	2023	
19	The Tropical BS8	Thủ Đức	134,5	39	2023	Phân khu Tropical thuộc The Beverly Solari
20	The Tropical BS10	Thủ Đức	134,5	39	2023	Phân khu Tropical thuộc The Beverly Solari
21	Ocean Tower	District 1, Ho Chi Minh City	134	36	2024	The second subdivision belongs to Grand Marina Saigon
22	The Oasis BS16	Thủ Đức	131,5	39	2023	Oasis subdivision belongs to The Beverly Solari
23	Glory Heights GH	Thủ Đức	131,5	39	2024	Glory Heights subdivision belongs to The Beverly Solari
24	The Alpha Residence	Thủ Đức	129	38	2024	
25	The Resort BE1	Thủ Đức	127,3	34	2023	Resort subdivision of The Beverly
26	The Resort BE2	Thủ Đức	127,3	34	2023	Resort subdivision of The Beverly
27	The Resort BE3	Thủ Đức	127,3	34	2023	Resort subdivision of The Beverly
28	The Star BE8	Thủ Đức	127,3	34	2023	Star subdivision belongs to The Beverly
29	The Star BE9	Thủ Đức	127,3	34	2023	Star subdivision belongs to The Beverly
30	The Star BE10	Thủ Đức	127,3	34	2023	Star subdivision belongs to The Beverly
31	The Star Hill	Thủ Đức	127,3	34	2023	Star subdivision belongs to The Beverly
32	The Resort BE5	Thủ Đức	120,4	32	2023	Resort subdivision of The Beverly
33	The Resort BE6	Thủ Đức	120,4	32	2023	Resort subdivision of The Beverly
34	The Resort BE7	Thủ Đức	120,4	32	2023	Resort subdivision of The Beverly
35	The Park Avenue PA1	District 11, Ho Chi Minh City	119	32	2024	
36	The Park Avenue PA2	District 11, Ho Chi Minh City	119	32	2024	
37	The Signial 1	District 7, Ho Chi Minh City	118	33	2023	Belongs to the La Casa complex
38	The Signial 2	District 7, Ho Chi Minh City	118	33	2023	Belongs to the La Casa complex
39	V Plaza A	District 7, Ho Chi Minh City	118	27	2023	
40	V Plaza B	District 7, Ho Chi Minh City	118	27	2023	
41	King Crown Infinity Apollo	Thủ Đức	116	30	2023	
42	King Crown Infinity Artemis	Thủ Đức	116	30	2023	
43	Sunshine Horizon A	District 4, Ho Chi Minh City	116	34	2024	
44	Sunshine Horizon B	District 4, Ho Chi Minh City	116	34	2024	
45	The Oasis BS15	Thủ Đức	115,5	34	2023	Oasis subdivision belongs to The Beverly Solari
46	The Tropical BS7	Thủ Đức	115,5	34	2023	Tropical subdivision belongs to The Beverly Solari
47	Glory Heights GH2	Thủ Đức	115,5	34	2024	Glory Heights subdivision belongs to The Beverly Solari
48	D-Homme	District 6, Ho Chi Minh City	114,7	30	2023	
49	City Gate 3A	District 8, Ho Chi Minh City	114,5	33	2024	
50	City Gate 3B	District 8, Ho Chi Minh City	114,5	33	2024	
51	City Gate 3C	District 8, Ho Chi Minh City	114,5	33	2024	
52	The Tropical BS9	Thủ Đức	112,3	34	2023	Phân khu Tropical thuộc The Beverly Solari
53	Nara Residences N1	Thủ Đức	112	29	2023	A part of the observation complex of Empire City
54	Nara Residences N2	Thủ Đức	112	29	2023	A part of the observation complex of Empire City
55	Akari City AK7	Bình Tân	112	30	2024	Belongs to Akari City Urban Area
56	Akari City AK8	Bình Tân	112	30	2024	Belongs to Akari City Urban Area
57	Akari City AK9	Bình Tân	112	30	2024	Belongs to Akari City Urban Area
58	Akari City AK10	Bình Tân	112	30	2024	Belongs to Akari City Urban Area
59	Rome by Diamond Lotus	Thủ Đức	109	32	2024	
60	The Zeit River A	Thủ Đức	109	32	2023	The roof will be topped off at the end of 2023
61	The Peak Garden	District 7, Ho Chi Minh City	105,2	26	2024	
62	Metro Star 1	Thủ Đức	102,3	28	2023	Located next to Binh Thai station
63	Metro Star 2	Thủ Đức	102,3	28	2023	Located next to Binh Thai station

=== Planned, approved, proposed ===
Class	Building	Location	Height	Number of floors	Year	Status
1	Tháp Hải Đăng Vinhomes Cần Giờ	Cần Giờ	600+	108	2031	Approve
2	Landmark 99	Bình Chánh District	460	99	-	Propose
3	Empire 88 Tower	Thủ Đức	398	88	2024	Plan
4	Sunshine Tower A	District 1, Ho Chi Minh City	370	72	-	Propose
5	Sunshine Tower B	District 1, Ho Chi Minh City	370	72	-	Propose
6	Eco Green Tall Tower	District 7, Ho Chi Minh City	275	69	-	Approve
7	Saigon Centre 3	District 8, Ho Chi Minh City	250	60	-	Plan
8	Eco Smart City Tower	Thủ Đức	240	64	2025	Groundbreaking
9	Eco Smart City - Lô 2.3 T2	Thủ Đức	192	52	2025	Groundbreaking
10	Eco Smart City - Lô 2.6 T2	Thủ Đức	192	52	2025	Groundbreaking
11	The Skyview	Thủ Đức	168	36	2024	Plan
12	Eximbank Tower	District 8, Ho Chi Minh City	163	40	-	Approve
13	Marina Park C	District 7, Ho Chi Minh City	153	45	-	Propose
14	The Grand Sentosa S1	Nhà Bè district	153	45	-	Plan
15	The Grand Sentosa S2	Nhà Bè district	153	45	-	Plan
Approve
17	Masteri Thanh Đa Peninsula T1	Bình Thạnh	150	45	2024	Approve
18	Masteri Thanh Đa Peninsula T2	Bình Thạnh	150	45	2024	Approve
19	Masteri Thanh Đa Peninsula T3	Bình Thạnh	150	45	2024	Approve
20	Masteri Thanh Đa Peninsula T4	Bình Thạnh	150	45	2024	Approve
21	Masteri Thanh Đa Peninsula T6	Bình Thạnh	150	45	2024	Approve
22	Masteri Thanh Đa Peninsula T7	Bình Thạnh	150	45	2024	Approve
23	The Skyline	Thủ Đức	148	34	2024	Plan
24	Eco Smart City - Lô 2.6 T1	Thủ Đức	148<	40	2025	Groundbreaking
25	Marina Park B	District 7, Ho Chi Minh City	147	43	-	Propose
26	Cape Pearl	Bình Thạnh	145	44	-	Propose
27	Sunshine Sky City S5	District 7, Ho Chi Minh City	144,5	38	2025	Plan
28	Sunshine Sky City S6	District 7, Ho Chi Minh City	144,5	38	2025	Plan
29	The Opusk B	Thủ Đức	144	36	-	Plan
30	The Loft Riviera Point T1	District 7, Ho Chi Minh City	143	40	-	Approve
31	The Loft Riviera Point T2	District 7, Ho Chi Minh City	143	40	-	Approve
32	The Nexus 2	District 1, Ho Chi Minh City	141	36	-	plan
33	Sunshine Sky City S7	District 7, Ho Chi Minh City	137,5	36	2025	plan
34	Sunshine Sky City S8	District 7, Ho Chi Minh City	137,5	36	2025	plan
35	Sunshine Sky City S9	District 7, Ho Chi Minh City	137,5	36	2025	plan
36	Chung cư New Tech A	District 7, Ho Chi Minh City	135	37	2025	Approve
37	Chung cư New Tech B	District 7, Ho Chi Minh City	135	37	2025	Approve
38	Masteri Thanh Đa Peninsula T5	Bình Thạnh	127	38	2024	Approve
39	Marina Park D	District 7, Ho Chi Minh City	126	37	-	Propose
40	Eco Green Saigon MR1	District 7, Ho Chi Minh City	123	36	-	plan
41	Eco Green Saigon MR2	District 7, Ho Chi Minh City	123	36	-	plan
42	Sunshine Venicia	Thủ Đức	122	36	-	Propose
43	Charming Dragonic A	District 5, Ho Chi Minh City	119	35	-	Propose
44	Lavida Plus B	District 7, Ho Chi Minh City	119	33	-	Approve
45	Thủ Thiêm Green Jewel A	Thủ Đức	119	35	-	Propose
46	Thủ Thiêm Green Jewel B	Thủ Đức	119	35	-	Propose
47	Thủ Thiêm Green Jewel C	Thủ Đức	119	35	-	Propose
48	The Opusk A	Thủ Đức	112	28	-	plan
49	Akari City AK11	Bình Tân	112	30	-	Plan
50	Akari City AK12	Bình Tân	112	30	-	Plan
51	Akari City AK13	Bình Tân	112	30	-	Plan
52	Akari City AK14	Bình Tân	112	30	-	Plan
53	MU5 Empire City	Thủ Đức	112	33	-	Approve
54	The Monarch	Thủ Đức	112	33	-	Approve
55	The Blue Star CC1	District 7, Ho Chi Minh City	109	32	-	Plan
56	The Blue Star CC2	District 7, Ho Chi Minh City	109	32	-	Plan
57	The Blue Star CC3	District 7, Ho Chi Minh City	109	32	-	Plan
58	The Blue Star CC4	District 7, Ho Chi Minh City	109	32	-	Plan
59	Cao ốc Nguyễn Kim Khu B - Tòa B	District 10, Ho Chi Minh City	105	31	-	Plan
60	The Blue Star CC5	District 7, Ho Chi Minh City	105	31	-	Plan
61	The Blue Star CC6	District 7, Ho Chi Minh City	105	31	-	Plan
62	The Blue Star CC7	District 7, Ho Chi Minh City	105	31	-	Plan
63	Grand Central	District 3, Ho Chi Minh City	102	30	-	Propose
64	Marina Park A	District 7, Ho Chi Minh City	102	30	-	Propose
65	Riverfront Residence B	Thủ Đức	102	30	-	Propose
66	Springlight City A	District 1, Ho Chi Minh City	102	30	-	Propose
67	Springlight City B	District 1, Ho Chi Minh City	102	30	-	Propose
68	Springlight City C	District 1, Ho Chi Minh City	102	30	-	Propose
69	Springlight City D	District 1, Ho Chi Minh City	102	30	-	Propose

=== Vision ===
Class	Building	Location	Height	Number of floors	Year
1	Xi Park Tower	District 1, Ho Chi Minh City	220	54	-
2	Saigon Gem Tower	District 1, Ho Chi Minh City	205	47	-
3	Thiên Thanh Sài Gòn Plaza - Hotel	District 10, Ho Chi Minh City	204	60	-
4	Thiên Thanh Sài Gòn Plaza - Office	District 10, Ho Chi Minh City	198	58	-
5	VIJA Park 1A	Thủ Đức	198	40	2009
6	VIJA Park 2A	Thủ Đức	198	40	2010
7	VIJA Park 2B	Thủ Đức	198	40	2010
8	Thien Thanh Saigon Plaza - Education	District 10, Ho Chi Minh City	177	52	-
9	Landmark Riverside Military Port	Bình Thạnh	160	45	-
10	PetroVietnam Landmark Tower	Thủ Đức	134	25	2011
11	VIJA Park 1B	Thủ Đức	130	25	2009
12	Vina Square Hotel Tower	District 5, Ho Chi Minh City	103	27	-
13	VIJA Park 1C	Thủ Đức	94	20	2009
14	Vina Square Residence 1	District 5, Ho Chi Minh City	85	25	-
15	Vina Square Residence 2	District 5, Ho Chi Minh City	85	25	-
16	Vina Square Residence 3	District 5, Ho Chi Minh City	85	25	-
17	Nowzone 3A	District 1, Ho Chi Minh City	82	24	-
18	Nowzone 3B	District 1, Ho Chi Minh City	82	24	-
19	VIJA Park 1D	Thủ Đức	78	18	2008

== Cancelled or delayed ==
=== Delayed ===
Class	Building	Location	Height	Floor	Start	Delay	Progress
1	Saigon Melinh Tower 1	District 1, Ho Chi Minh City	240	48	Undeveloped		Temporarily used as Rạn Biển City Center Restaurant
2	One Central Saigon A	District 1, Ho Chi Minh City	240	55	2012 / 2019	2022	Construction up to the 14th floor
3	One Central Saigon B	District 1, Ho Chi Minh City	218	48	2012 / 2019	2022	Construction up to the 14th floor
4	Dragon Riverside Tower	District 5, Ho Chi Minh City	202	53	Undeveloped		Vacant land
5	Saigon Jewelry Center Tower	District 1, Ho Chi Minh City	200	52	Undeveloped		Vacant land
6	Alpha Hill A	District 1, Ho Chi Minh City	195	49	Undeveloped		Vacant land
7	Alpha Hill B	District 1, Ho Chi Minh City	195	49	Undeveloped		Vacant land
8	Saigon Melinh Tower 2	District 1, Ho Chi Minh City	180	36	Undeveloped		Vacant land
9	Grand Marina Spring Tower	District 1, Ho Chi Minh City	175	47	2020	2022	Construction to the 1st floor
10	Grand Marina Strait Tower	District 1, Ho Chi Minh City	175	47	2020	2022	Construction to the 1st floor
11	Satra Tax Plaza	District 1, Ho Chi Minh City	165	40	Undeveloped		Vacant land
12	Viet Capital Center	District 1, Ho Chi Minh City	160	40	2017	2017	Construction to the 5th floor
13	Alpha Tower	District 1, Ho Chi Minh City	160	35	Undeveloped		Vacant land
14	BIDV Tower	District 1, Ho Chi Minh City	152	40	Undeveloped		Vacant land
15	Sunshine Diamond River A1	District 7, Ho Chi Minh City	152	40	Undeveloped		Vacant land
16	Sunshine Diamond River A2	District 7, Ho Chi Minh City	152	40	Undeveloped		Vacant land
17	Sunshine Diamond River A3	District 7, Ho Chi Minh City	152	40	Undeveloped		Vacant land
18	Sunshine Diamond River D1	District 7, Ho Chi Minh City	152	40	Undeveloped		Vacant land
19	Sunshine Diamond River D2	District 7, Ho Chi Minh City	152	40	Undeveloped		Vacant land
20	Sunshine Diamond River D3	District 7, Ho Chi Minh City	152	40	Undeveloped		Vacant land
21	Lancaster Lincoln A	District 4, Ho Chi Minh City	144	40	2016	2018	Complete the underground section
22	Lancaster Lincoln B	District 4, Ho Chi Minh City	144	40	2016	2018	Hoàn thành phần ngầm
23	Dragon Hill Premier A	District 5, Ho Chi Minh City	136	40	2017	2019	Construction to the 1st floor
24	Dragon Hill Premier B	District 5, Ho Chi Minh City	136	40	2017	2019	Construction to the 1st floor
25	Laimian Center CT-1 (7 tòa)	Thủ Đức	136	40	2019	2020	Thi công phần ngầm
26	Laimian Park CT-2 (6 tòa)	Thủ Đức	136	40	Undeveloped		Vacant land
27	Laimian Galaxy City CT-3 (4 tòa)	Thủ Đức	136	40	2019	2020	Complete the underground section
28	Grand Marina Bay Tower	District 1, Ho Chi Minh City	134	36	2020	2022	Construction to the 1st floor
29	Laimian Galaxy City CT-4 (3 tòa)	Thủ Đức	133	39	2019	2020	Complete the underground section
30	Laimian Ruby CT-7	Thủ Đức	129	38	Undeveloped		Vacant land
31	7-9 Ton Duc Thang	District 1, Ho Chi Minh City	123	34	Undeveloped		Vacant land
32	Charmington Iris - Aqua Luxury	District 4	119	35	Undeveloped		Vacant land
33	Charmington Iris - Iris Luxury	District 4	119	35	Undeveloped		Vacant land
34	Laimian Diamond CT-6	Thủ Đức	119	35	Undeveloped		Vacant land
35	The Palace Residence A	Thủ Đức	119	35	Undeveloped		Vacant land
36	The Palace Residence B	Thủ Đức	119	35	Undeveloped		Vacant land
37	The Palace Residence C	Thủ Đức	119	35	Undeveloped		Vacant land
38	The Palace Residence D	Thủ Đức	119	35	Undeveloped		Vacant land
39	The Palace Residence E&F	Thủ Đức	119	35	Undeveloped		Vacant land
40	Laimian Diamond CT-5	Thủ Đức	116	34	Undeveloped		Vacant land
41	Laimian Sapphire CT-8	Thủ Đức	116	34	Undeveloped		Vacant land
42	Majestic Hotel expanded	District 1	110	27	2010 / 2019	2016 / 2019	Complete the underground section
43	Centa Park A	Tân Bình	109	32	Undeveloped		Vacant land
44	Centa Park B	Tân Bình	109	32	Undeveloped		Vacant land
45	Centa Park C	Tân Bình	109	32	Undeveloped		Vacant land
46	Centa Park D	Tân Bình	109	32	Undeveloped		Vacant land
47	Tropic Garden B	Thủ Đức	103	27	Undeveloped		Residential area
48	Soái Kình Lâm A Apartment	District 5, Ho Chi Minh City	102	30	Undeveloped		The land has not been cleared yet
49	The Avila 2F	District 8, Ho Chi Minh City	102	30	Undeveloped		Vacant land

=== Canceled ===
Building	Location	Height	Floor	Notes
Thu Thiem Tower	Thủ Đức	500	120	Current Empire 88 Tower location
GS Thu Thiem	Thủ Đức	452	120	Current Zeit River location
SCIC Financial Tower	Thủ Đức	450	105	
Phú Mỹ Hưng Financial Tower	District 7, Ho Chi Minh City	400	80	
Dự án Amigo	District 1, Ho Chi Minh City	400	99	Current location of Saigon Prince Hotel and surrounding residential areas
Tân Tạo Sky Tower	Bình Thạnh	300	84	Current location of Vinhomes Central Park
Hưng Điền New Town - Tháp 81 tầng	Bình Chánh	278	81	
Hung Dien New Town - 69-storey tower	Bình Chánh	237	69	
Vinashin Tower	District 1, Ho Chi Minh City	210	55	
Lê Lợi Hotel	District 1, Ho Chi Minh City	190	50	Current location of Saigon General Hospital.
Windhorst Tower	District 1, Ho Chi Minh City	180	55	Current Vietcombank Tower location
Saigon Financial Center	District 1, Ho Chi Minh City	175	40	Current location of Saigon General Hospital
Bonday Ben Thanh Tower	District 1, Ho Chi Minh City	170,1	35	Current Vietcombank Tower location
Mekong Housing Bank Tower	District 1, Ho Chi Minh City	170	38	Current location of BIDV Ham Nghi branch
Lavenue Crown	District 1, Ho Chi Minh City	160	36	
Harmony Point	District 4, Ho Chi Minh City	150	35	
The Eden Center	District 1, Ho Chi Minh City	119	33	Current Union Square location
Intresco Plaza	District 3, Ho Chi Minh City	85	25	Current location of La Vela Saigon Hotel
Ascent Cityview	District 4, Ho Chi Minh City	68	21	
Otran Tower	District 1, Ho Chi Minh City	59	14	Current Ree Tower location

== Timeline of tallest buildings ==
Highest number of years	Building	Image	Height	Number of floors	District
2018 – Present	Landmark 81	thế=	461.3 m (1,513 ft 5 in)	81	Bình Thạnh
2010 – 2018	Bitexco Financial Tower	thế=	262.5 m (861 ft 3 in)	68	District 1, Ho Chi Minh City
1997 – 2010	Saigon Trade Center	thế=	160 m (524 ft 11 in)	33	District 1, Ho Chi Minh City
1996 – 1997	Saigon Centre 1	thế=	106 m (347 ft 9 in)	25	District 1, Ho Chi Minh City
1995 – 1996	Sunwah Tower	thế=	92 m (301 ft 10 in)	21	District 1, Ho Chi Minh City
1993 – 1995	VTP Building	thế=	65 m (213 ft 3 in)	15	District 1, Ho Chi Minh City
1895 – 1993	Notre-Dame Cathedral Basilica of Saigon	thế=	60.5 m (198 ft 6 in)	--	District 1, Ho Chi Minh City
1876 – 1895	Tân Định Church	thế=	55.3 m (181 ft 5 in)	--	District 3, Ho Chi Minh City
1873 – 1876	Norodom Palace		~20 m (65 ft 7 in)	2	District 1, Ho Chi Minh City
1859 – 1873	?				
1836 – 1859	Phụng Castle	thế=	20 m (65 ft 7 in)	-	District 1, Ho Chi Minh City
1790 – 1835	Bát Quái Castle	thế=	6.4 m (21 ft 0 in)	-	District 1, Ho Chi Minh City

== See also ==
- List of tallest buildings in Vietnam
- List of tallest buildings in Hanoi
- List of tallest buildings in Haiphong
- List of tallest buildings in Danang
