= Antonio Giorgetti =

Italian sculptor

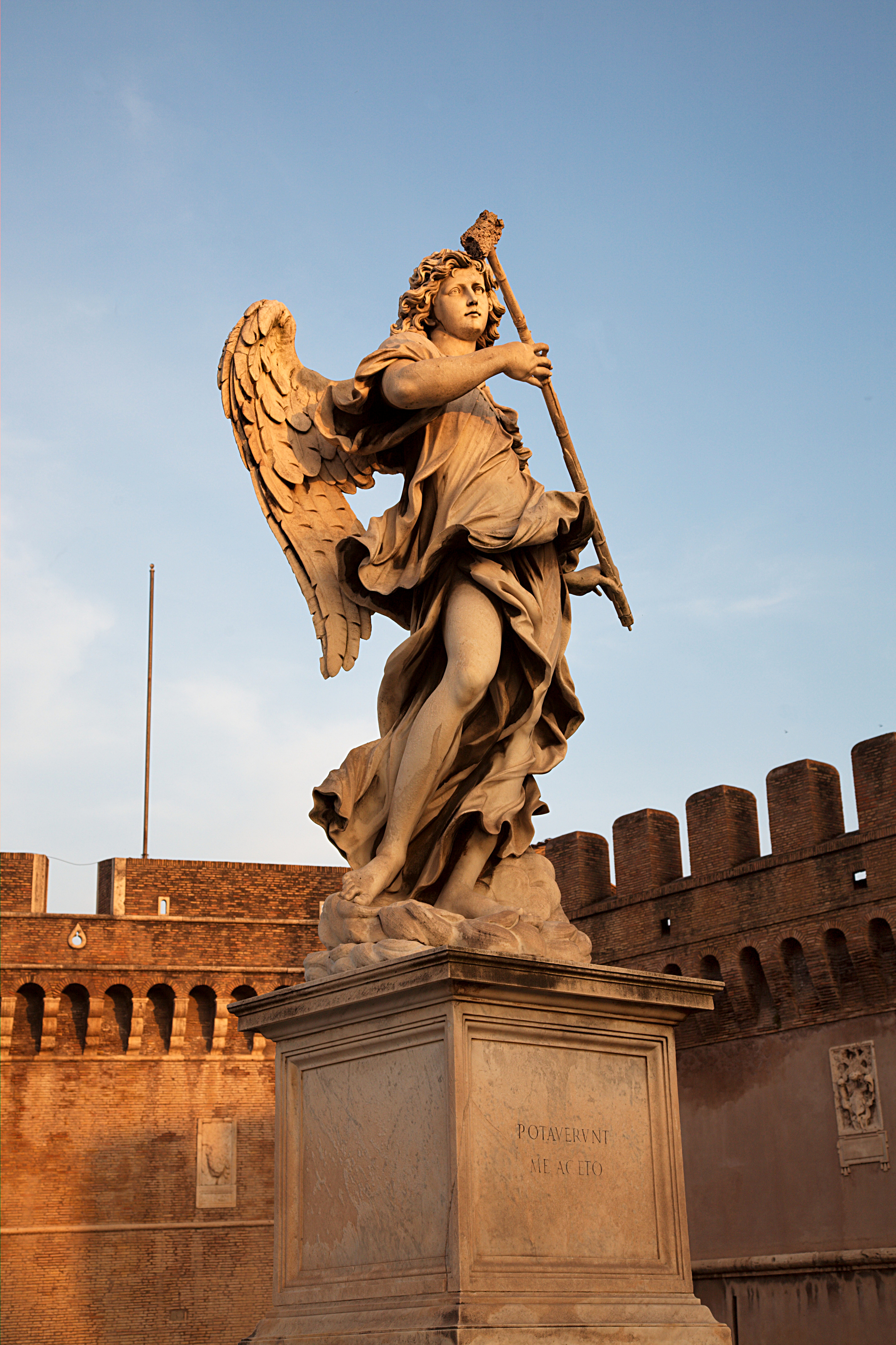
Angel with the Sponge by Giorgetti, one of the series of Angels with the Instruments of the Passion on the Ponte Sant'Angelo, Rome

Antonio Giorgetti (1635 – 24 December 1669) was an Italian sculptor. He was born and died in Rome, where he spent his entire career, a disciple of Gian Lorenzo Bernini. His most prominent sculpture is the Angel with the Sponge on the Ponte Sant'Angelo, where he was working under the direction of Bernini, who provided sketches and in some instances bozzetti for the angels. For Borromini's Capella Spada in the church of San Girolamo della Carità (1660), Giorgetti provided the two kneeling angels that hold up the jasper draperies that serve as a balustrade to the altar.

By January 1660, Giorgetti was sufficiently closely linked to Cardinal Francesco Barberini to be referred to in several Barberini accounts as nostro scultore.

Although sometimes attributed to Antonio, the recumbent statue of Saint Sebastian (c. 1671/72) in the Basilica di San Sebastiano fuori le mura on the via Appia, Rome, is by his younger brother Giuseppe Giorgetti, who became head of the Giorgetti workshop after his brother's death.
