= District 7, Ho Chi Minh City =

District 7 Quận 7 South Saigon
- Urban district
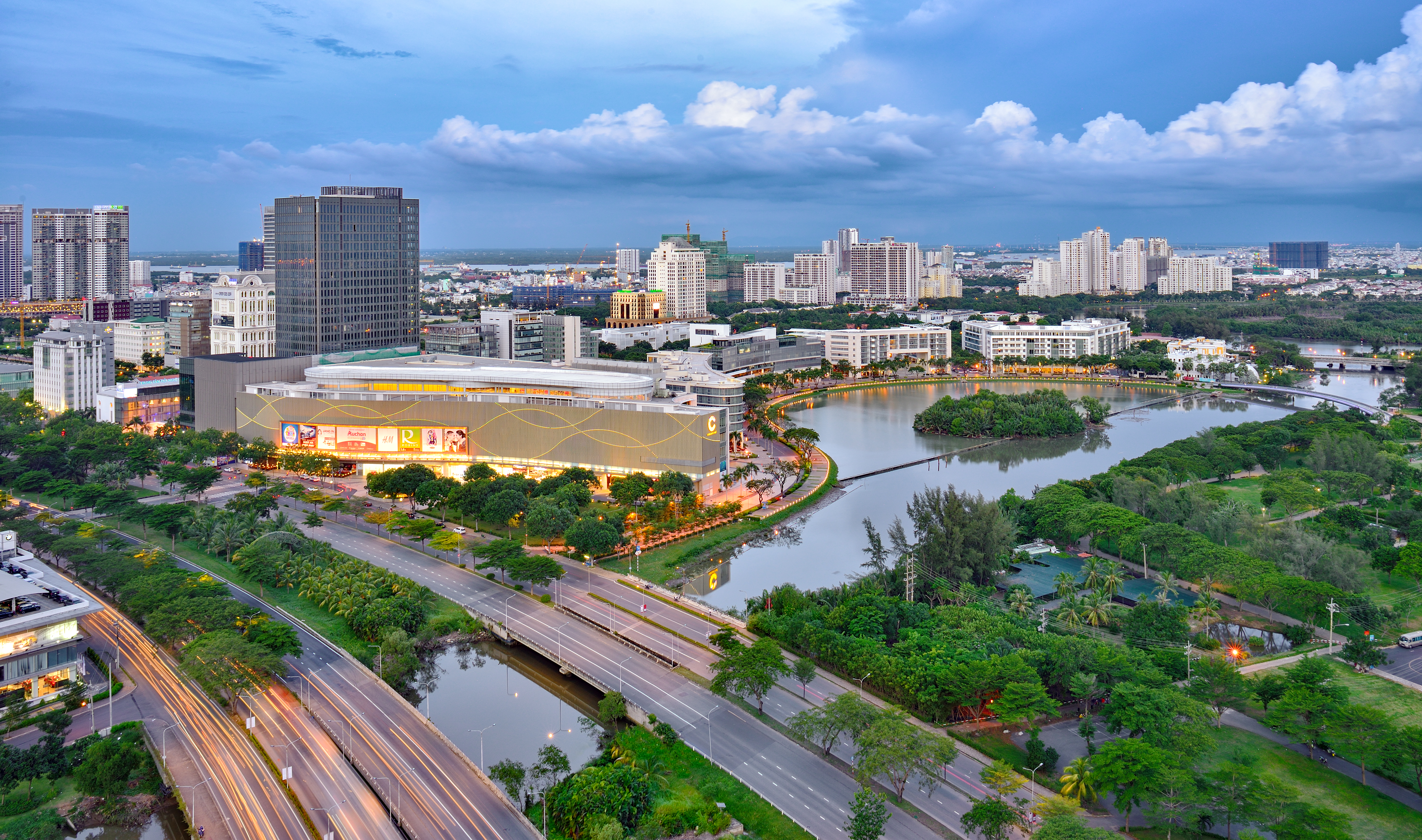
- Phú Mỹ Hưng urban area in 2019

- Location within Vietnam
- Coordinates: 10°44′19″N 106°43′35″E
- Country: Vietnam
- Centrally Governed City: Ho Chi Minh City
- Established: 1997 (District 7, Ho Chi Minh City)
- Seat: District 7 Administrative Center, 7 Tân Phú Street, Tân Phú ward
- Wards: 10 Wards

Area
  - Total: 36 km^{2} (14 sq mi)

Population (2024)
  - Total: 456,789
  - Density: 13,000/km^{2} (33,000/sq mi)

Demographics
  - Main ethnic groups: predominantly Kinh
- Time zone: UTC+07 (ICT)
- Website: quan7.hochiminhcity.gov.vn

District 7 (Quận 7) is a former urban district of Ho Chi Minh City, the largest city in Vietnam. As of 2024, the district had a population of 456,789 and an area of 36 km^{2} (14 sq mi).District 7 was dissolved on 1 July 2025 as part of the 2025 Vietnamese administrative reform, which abolished all district-level units in Vietnam, with its wards consolidated into four larger wards directly under Ho Chi Minh City.

District 7 was formed from the northern part of Nhà Bè District in 1997, connected to the city of Thủ Đức by the Phú Mỹ Bridge, which opened in September 2009. The Phú Mỹ Hưng New City is located in the district (mostly entire the wards of Tân Phú and Tân Phong).

== Geography and location ==
District 7 located on the south side of urban core of former Ho Chi Minh City, adjacent with:

- Nhơn Trạch district, Đồng Nai province (by Nhà Bè River) and Thủ Đức (by Saigon River) to the east
- District 8 and Bình Chánh district to the west by Ông Lớn Canal
- Nhà Bè district to the south by waterway of Rạch Đỉa – Rạch Rơi – Phú Xuân River
- District 4 (by Tẻ Channel) and Thủ Đức (by Saigon River) to the north.

The district has an area of 35,69 km², population as of 2019 is 360,155 people, population density is 10,091 people/km².

== Administration ==
District 7 consists of 10 wards (phường), which is now 4 wards directly under Ho Chi Minh City:

- Tân Thuận
  - Bình Thuận
  - Tân Thuận Đông
  - Tân Thuận Tây
- Phú Thuận
  - Phú Thuận
  - Phú Mỹ (eastern Huỳnh Tấn Phát Road)
- Tân Hưng
  - Tân Hưng
  - Tân Kiểng
  - Tân Phong
  - Tân Quy
- Tân Mỹ
  - Tân Phú
  - Phú Mỹ (western Huỳnh Tấn Phát Road)

== Education ==
=== Primary Schools ===
No	School name	School Code	Domain
1	Phu Dong Primary School	thphudongq7	https://thphudongq7.hcm.edu.vn
2	Dang Thuy Tram Primary School	thdangthuytram	https://thdangthuytram.hcm.edu.vn
3	Le Van tam Primary School	thlevantamq7	https://thlevantamq7.hcm.edu.vn
4	Tran Quoc Toan Primary School	thtranquoctoanq7	https://thtranquoctoanq7.hcm.edu.vn
5	Tan Thuan Primary School	thtanthuan	https://thtanthuan.hcm.edu.vn
6	Vo Thi Sau Primary School	thvothisauq7	https://thvothisauq7.hcm.edu.vn
7	Luong The Vinh Primary School	thluongthevinhq7	https://thluongthevinhq7.hcm.edu.vn
8	Kim Dong Primary School	thkimdongq7	https://thkimdongq7.hcm.edu.vn
9	Nguyen Van Huong Primary School	thnguyenvanhuong	http://thnguyenvanhuong.hcm.edu.vn/
10	Pham Huu Lau Primary School	thphamhuulau	https://thphamhuulau.hcm.edu.vn
11	Nguyen Thi Dinh Primary School	thnguyenthidinhq7	https://thnguyenthidinhq7.hcm.edu.vn
12	Tan Quy Primary School	thtanquyq7	https://thtanquyq7.hcm.edu.vn
13	Phu Thuan Primary School	thphuthuanq7	https://thphuthuanq7.hcm.edu.vn
14	Le Quy Don Primary School	thlequydonq7	https://thlequydonq7.hcm.edu.vn
15	Phu My Primary School	thphumy	https://thphumy.hcm.edu.vn
16	Phan Huu Thuc Primary School	thphanhuythuc	https://thphanhuythuc.hcm.edu.vn
17	Dinh Bo Linh Primary School	thdinhbolinh	https://thdinhbolinh.hcm.edu.vn
18	Le Anh Xuan Primary School	thleanhxuanq7	https://thleanhxuanq7.hcm.edu.vn

=== Secondary schools ===
No	School name	School Code	Domain
1	Nguyen Hien Secondary school	thcsnguyenhienq7	https://thcsnguyenhienq7.hcm.edu.vn
2	Tran Quoc Tuan Secondary school	thcstranquoctuan	https://thcstranquoctuan.hcm.edu.vn
3	Huynh Tan Phat Secondary school	thcshuynhtanphat	https://thcshuynhtanphat.hcm.edu.vn
4	Hoang Quoc Viet Secondary school	thcshoangquocviet	https://thcshoangquocviet.hcm.edu.vn
5	Nguyen Thi Thap Secondary school	thcsnguyenthithap	https://thcsnguyenthithap.hcm.edu.vn
6	Pham Huu Lau Secondary school	thcsphamhuulau	https://thcsphamhuulau.hcm.edu.vn
7	Nguyen Huu Tho Secondary school	thcsnguyenhuutho	https://thcsnguyenhuutho.hcm.edu.vn

=== Universities ===
- RMIT University Vietnam has a campus in Tân Phong. RMIT is a university from Melbourne, Australia, operating several campuses in Vietnam with approximately 7000 students and 650 staffs.
- Tôn Đức Thắng University is located in Tân Phong.
