= IFC One Saigon =

Highrise in Ho Chi Minh City, Vietnam

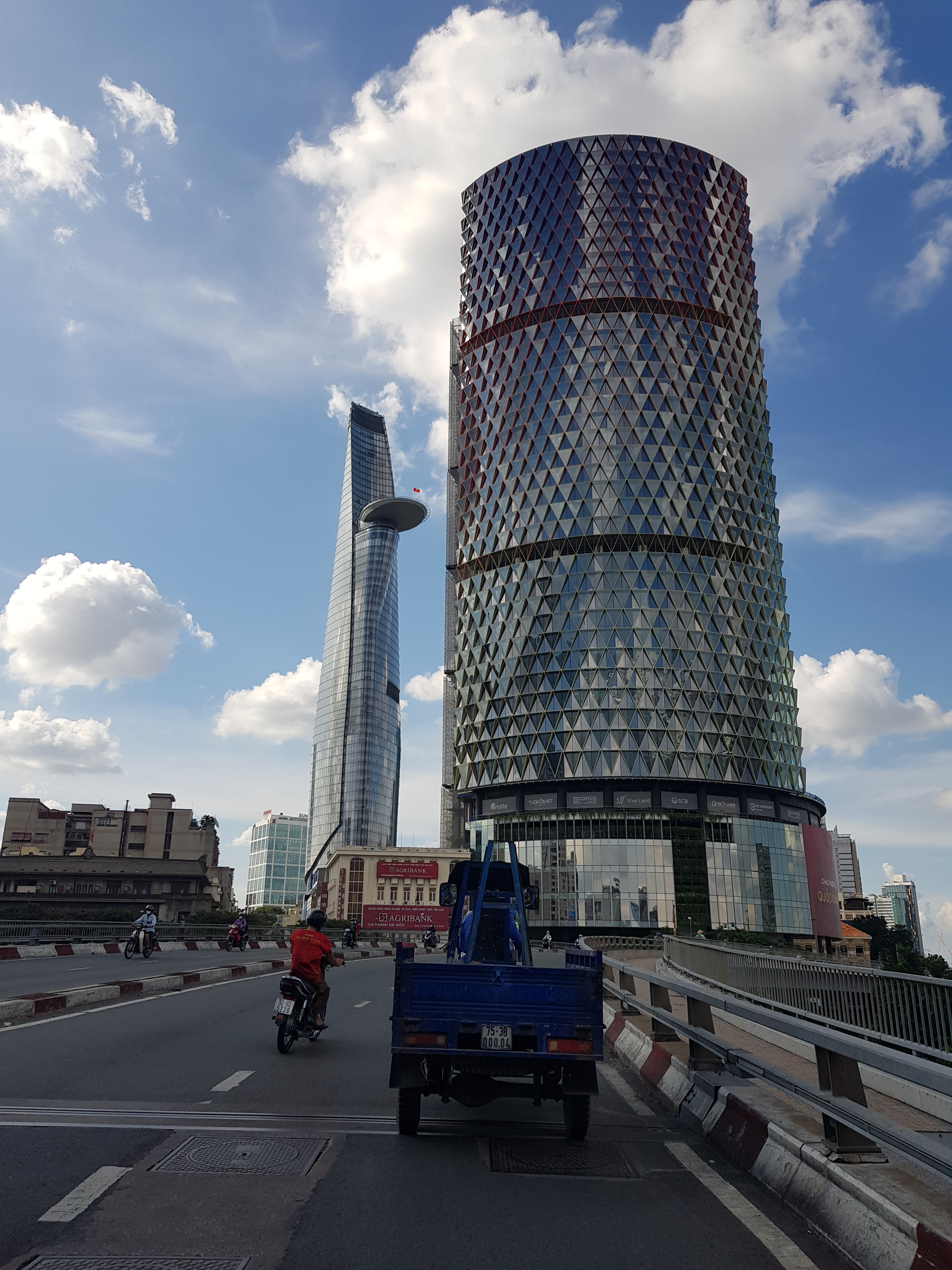
- IFC One Saigon, seen from Khánh Hội Bridge in 2023

- Location within Vietnam
- Former names: Saigon M&C; Saigon One

General information
- Status: Glass installation complete. As of 2 September 2022, remaining construction is pending government inspection.
- Type: Shopping mall; office; apartment
- Location: Financial District, Saigon, 34A Tôn Đức Thắng Boulevard – No. 1 Hàm Nghi Boulevard, Saigon, Ho Chi Minh City, Vietnam
- Coordinates: 10.7717°N 106.7040°E
- Construction started: 2007
- Estimated completion: Unknown
- Owner: Viva Land

Height
- Top floor: 195.3 m (641 ft)

Technical details
- Floor count: 41

Design and construction
- Architects: RSP Architects Planners and Engineers
- Developer: Viva Land
- Main contractor: Coteccons

IFC One Saigon (Note: IFC stands for International Financial Center or some alternate writing of it), formerly Saigon M&C Tower then Saigon One Tower, is a 41-storey high-rise building currently under construction at 34A Tôn Đức Thắng Boulevard, Ho Chi Minh City, Vietnam. The project is funded by Saigon M&C and Dong A Bank, with a budget of approximately $228 million USD.

As of 2026, IFC One Saigon is the fifth-tallest building in Ho Chi Minh City and the ninth-tallest in the country.

== History ==
IFC One Saigon in 2011 (then known as Saigon One Tower), seen from Thủ Thiêm Peninsula

The tower covers 6,800 square metres (1.7 acres; 0.68 ha) of land on the bank of the Saigon River. Its construction started in 2007 and was expected to be completed in 2012. Then known as Saigon M&C, it would have become one of the highest-priced real estate developments in Vietnam and was expected to be the second tallest building in Ho Chi Minh City, after Bitexco Financial Tower. However, construction work was halted in 2011, with the building being 80% complete. In 2017, outstanding debts of the developer totaling over VND 7,000 billion were sold to the Vietnam Asset Management for VND 680 billion (US$29 million). After defaulting on the debts, the building was seized by Vietnam Asset Management and put up for auction. The developers are on trial for falsifying documents that were used to secure the loans from Dong A Bank.

According to the city's construction department, Saigon One Tower and other stalled or delayed projects in the city are due to the 2008 financial crisis.

In 2021, the tower was acquired by Viva Land and renamed IFC One Saigon and is currently under construction as a mixed-used development. The building will contain offices, residential apartments, and retail outlets.

In 2022, many of the glass panels cladding the building's exterior were removed. Notably, the structure's facade featured large triangular panels with a color gradient shifting from red to green, creating an effect reminiscent of dragon scales. These panels combined to form an LED screen covering the entire front of the building (excluding the podium). The screen was used for commercial advertising, political messaging campaigns, and national holiday celebrations. No further construction work has taken place since the exterior cladding was replaced.
