= Giuseppe Giorgetti =

Italian sculptor

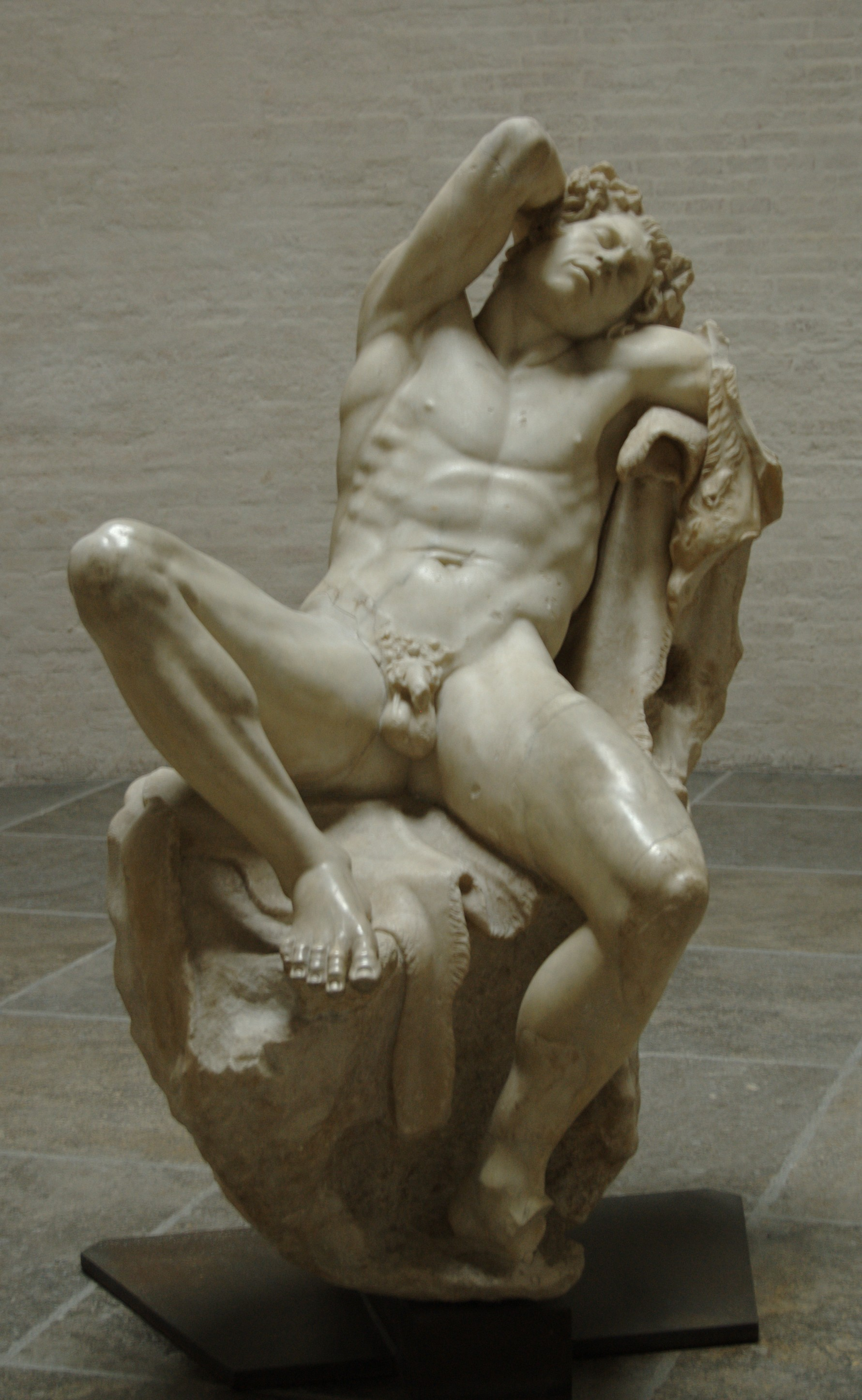
Barberini Faun

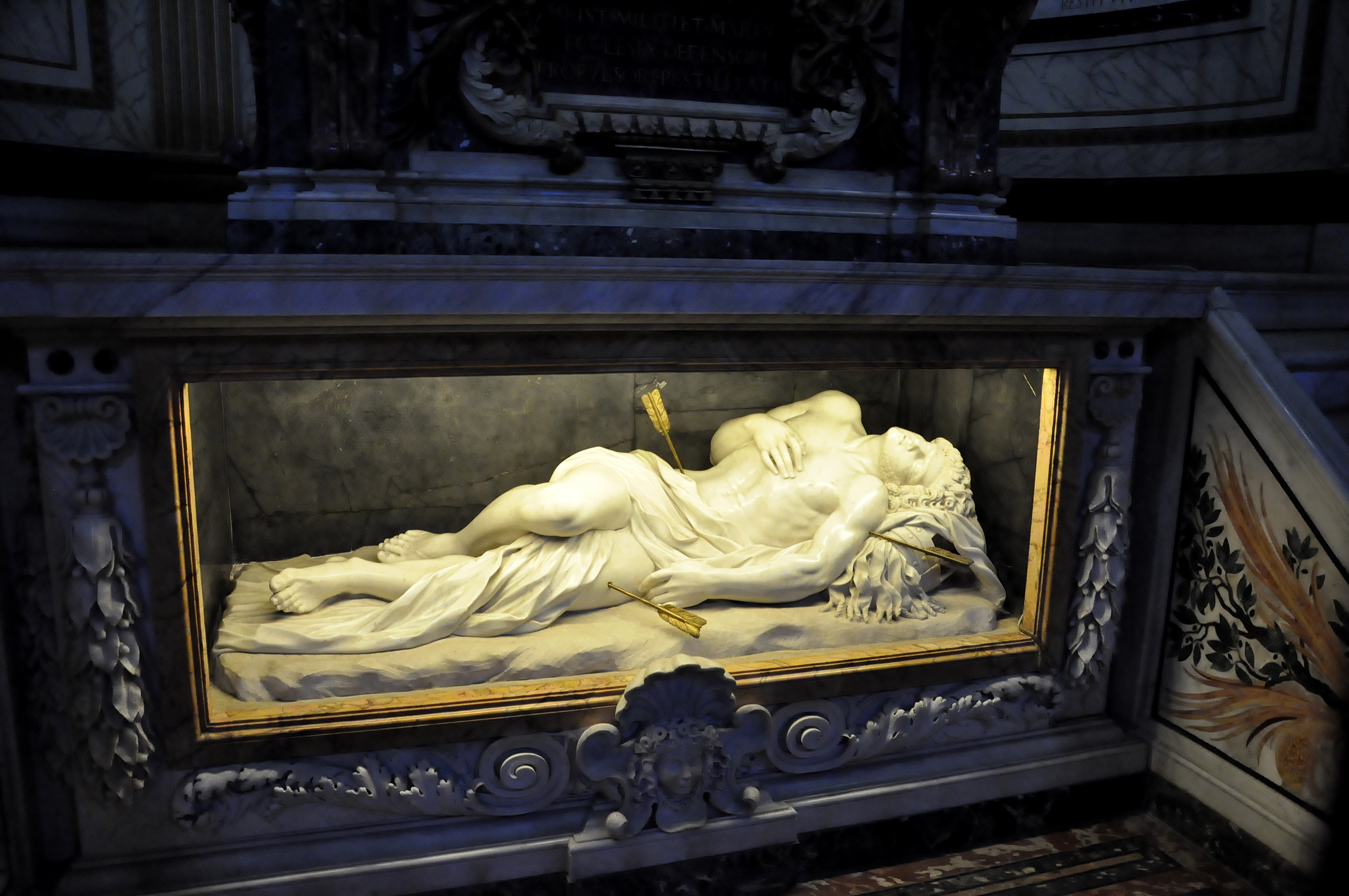
Saint Sebastian in the Basilica di San Sebastiano fuori le mura

Giuseppe Giorgetti (documented 1668–82) was an Italian sculptor in Rome who worked first under his older brother Antonio Giorgetti and took over his workshop after Antonio died in late 1669. He then also became the principal sculptor for the Barberini family for whom he undertook some restoration of ancient sculptures, most importantly of the Barberini Faun in 1679, carried out together with Lorenzo Ottoni.

His masterpiece is the recumbent statue of Saint Sebastian (c. 1671/72) in the Basilica di San Sebastiano fuori le mura on the via Appia, Rome, possibly after a design by Ciro Ferri.
