= German Vietnamese =

German Vietnamese or Vietnamese German may be:

- Of or relating to Germany-Vietnam relations
- Vietnamese people in Germany
- Germans in Vietnam
