= Khai Hoan Land =

Vietnamese real estate developer and agency

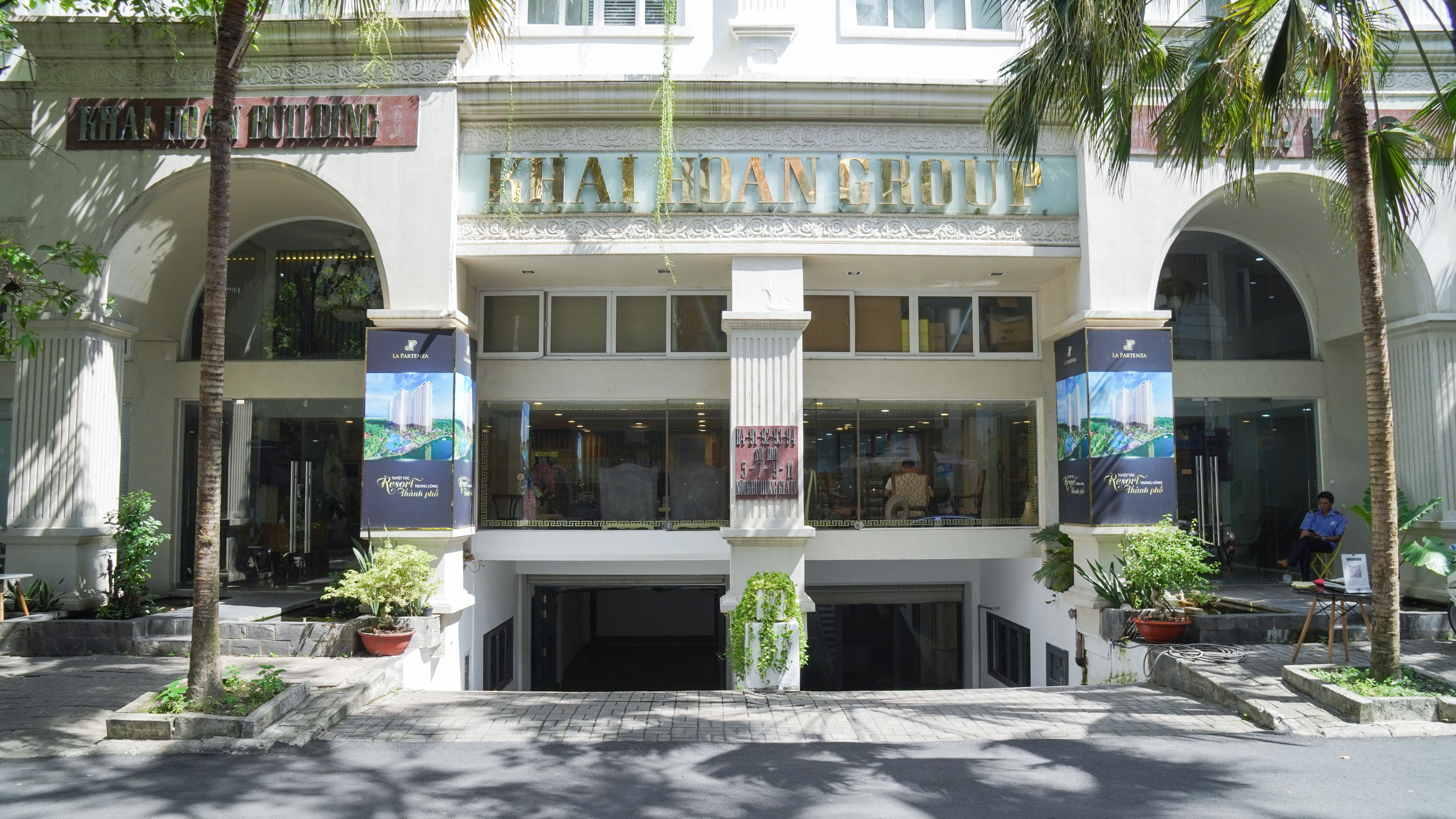
- Khai Hoan Building in Ho Chi Minh City houses the company's headquarter
- Trade name: Khai Hoan Land Group Joint Stock Company
- Native name: Công ty Cổ phần Tập đoàn Khải Hoàn Land
- Formerly: Khai Hoan Land Real Estate Joint Stock Company
- Type: Public company
- Traded as: HOSE: KHG
- Industry: Real estate, service
- Founded: 2009; 17 years ago in District 7, Ho Chi Minh City
- Founder: Nguyễn Khải Hoàn
- Headquarters: Ho Chi Minh City, Vietnam
- Area served: Vietnam
- Key people: Nguyễn Khải Hoàn (Chairman), Đinh Nhật Hạnh (Vice Chairman & CEO)
- Products: Real estate developing and agenting
- Services: Real estate projects investing and distributing
- Revenue: ▲1,288.142 billion VND (2021)
- Operating income: ▲517.281 billion VND (2021)
- Net income: ▲413.504 billion VND (2021)
- Total assets: ▲6,420.340 billion VND (2021)
- Number of employees: > 5,311
- Parent: Khải Hoàn Group
- Divisions: app. 50
- Subsidiaries: An Thinh Phat Property Investment Co., Ltd; An Pha Property Investment & Development Co., Ltd
- Website: khaihoanland.vn

Khai Hoan Land (Vietnamese: Công ty Cổ phần Tập đoàn Khải Hoàn Land) is a Vietnamese real estate developer and agency. Founded in 2009 by Nguyễn Khải Hoàn, it is headquartered in District 7, Ho Chi Minh City. In the south of the country alone, Khai Hoan Land maintains the largest market share by volume, which make it the region's leading property developer and real estate agency.

It follows “reading culture” as a company culture, presenting books at all training courses and awards events, and as gifts for philanthropy-themed events.

== History ==
In 2009, Khai Hoan Land was official established with a charter capital of 6 billion VND. In April 2010, the company increased its charter capital to 36 billion VND.

In 2014, Khai Hoan Land reached an agreement with Tan Lien Phat Investment Corporation to distribute Vinhomes Central Park Project. In 2015, it opened 15 concentrated divisions. In 2016, Khai Hoan Land became a strategic partner to VinaCapital Group.

In March 2017, the company raised its charter capital to VND 3,000 billion In December 2020, Khai Hoan Land was official transformed into a public company with a charter capital of VND 1,600 billion

In 2021, Khai Hoan Land was listed on Ho Chi Minh City Stock Exchange (HOSE) with stock code "KHG", succeeded in selling 14,817,547 shares to the public, raised its charter capital to VND 3,188 billion. In June 2021, Khai Hoan Land cooperated with T&T Group, then became the sole distributor for all projects under the T&T brand in the country.

In 2022, Khai Hoan Land tends to pay a dividend and issue shares. The company increased its charter capital to VND 4,431 billion and total number of concentrated divisions to 50 in the whole country. The company has reported a share capital of VND 4,494.35 billion in April 2026.

== Subsidiaries and affiliates ==
- Khải Hoàn Group Co., Ltd
- An Thinh Phat Property Investment Co., Ltd
- An Pha Property Investment & Development Co., Ltd
- Vung Tau Khai Hoan Group Co., Ltd
- Khai Minh Land Real Estate JSC

== Leadership ==
- Nguyễn Khải Hoàn: Chairman
- Đinh Nhật Hạnh: Vice Chairman & CEO
- Phùng Quang Hải: Vice CEO, Board of Director member
- Phạm Thị Minh Phụ: Vice CEO, Board member
- Võ Công Sơn: Board member
- Trần Mạnh Toàn: Board single-member
- Phạm Thị Hòa: Board single-member
- Trần Văn Thành: Vice CEO
- Lê Thị Như Ca: Vice CEO
- Dương Thanh Thương: Vice CEO

== Khải Hoàn Group ==
Khải Hoàn Group is one of the Khai Hoan Land notable associate companies. It is a Vietnamese diversified conglomerate which operates in various industries, such as real estate, education, technology, health care, agriculture, and entertainment. It is chaired by Nguyễn Khải Hoàn, who holds 80% of the authorized share capital. In 2019, the company raised its charter capital to VND 2,600 billion. As of December 2020, it raised to VND 5,560 billion.

== See also ==
- Nguyễn Khải Hoàn
- VinaCapital Group
