= Ha Van Tham =

Ha Van Tham (born 1972) is a Vietnamese former businessman and ex-chairman of the Ocean Group. At one time, Tham was one of the richest persons in Vietnam.

== Early life ==
Tham was born on 12 November 1972 in the An Ha commune, Lang Giang District, Bac Giang province, Vietnam.

== Career ==
From 1993 to 1997, Tham was director of the Binh Minh Private Enterprise. In 1997, he was appointed General Director of VNT Co., Ltd. From 2001 to 2003, he was the General Director of VietCans Joint Venture company and from 2003 to 2004 Vice Chairman of Joint Stock Commercial Bank for Rural of Hai Duong. From 2004 to 2007 he was the Chairman of Hai Duong Rural Commercial Bank. In 2007, he was appointed Chairman of Ocean Group.

By 2014, he was one of the richest persons in Vietnam, with significant stakes in hotel and real estate businesses and with a fortune estimated to be several billion dollars.

== Imprisonment ==
On October 24, 2014, he was arrested on suspicion of lending fraud. In 2017, Tham was tried along with dozens of former Ocean employees in a "major" corruption trial. They were all accused of embezzlement, abuse of power and economic mismanagement, in a case involving "millions of dollars." Tham was sentenced to life imprisonment, while Nguyen Xuan Son, who served as general director of Ocean Bank, received the death penalty. The rest of the defendants were all found guilty and sentenced to lengthy prison sentences.

== Personal life ==
Tham married Ho Thi Quynh Nga (born in 1977) and they have a daughter, Ha Bao Linh, he also has 2 sons, Ha Bao Minh and Ha Bao Long. His brother is Ha Trong Nam, owner of the Trang Tien ice cream parlor.

== See also ==
- Nguyễn Khải Hoàn
