= Uyen Ninh =

Vietnamese content creator in Germany (born 1995)

- Uyen in 2023
- Born: Ninh Thị Uyên; 10 November 1995 (age 31); Vietnam
- Occupation: Social media personality

Instagram information
- Page: Uyen Ninh
- Years active: 2020–present
- Followers: 2.2M followers

TikTok information
- Page: Uyen Ninh
- Years active: 2020–present
- Followers: 1.6M followers

YouTube information
- Channel: Uyen Ninh
- Years active: 2021–present
- Subscribers: 3.57M subscribers
- Views: 9,244,618,662 views
- Last updated: 22 August 2026
- Website: beacons.ai/uyenthininh

Ninh Thị Uyên (Note: In this Vietnamese name, the surname is Ninh. In accordance with Vietnamese custom, this person should be referred to by the given name, Uyên.) (born 10 November 1995), commonly known as Uyen Ninh, is a Vietnamese-German influencer and social media personality. She creates short-form content in English about German and Vietnamese cultural differences with her husband in her videos. She also runs a podcast called Culture Cuddles with her husband. Uyen was included on YouTube's 2023 Creators on the Rise list, and was included in a portrait exhibit at the embassy of Germany in Hanoi, Vietnam in 2025.

== Personal life ==
Uyen Ninh was born in Vietnam in 1995, and lived in Hanoi. Her parents have four daughters. In 2016, she met a German man while he was backpacking in Vietnam, and they began a long-distance relationship. After three years, Uyen moved to Mannheim, Germany to earn her master's degree in business administration, and join her partner. They married in 2025. She became a German citizen in 2026.

== Career ==
Uyen originally started creating online content with a blog on Facebook she worked on during the COVID-19 pandemic in 2020. She also downloaded TikTok, intending to use it to edit photos for Facebook. She struggled with writing the blog and decided to switch to short-form content. Since 2020, Uyen has posted videos to YouTube, TikTok, and Instagram.

Her content focuses on cultural differences between Germany and Vietnam. Some topics covered in her videos include lüften, German windows that tilt inwards when opened, the speed of Aldi cashiers scanning groceries, and tap water not having to be boiled. Her YouTube channel focuses on more serious topics, like stereotypes about mixed relationships. She runs a podcast called Culture Cuddles with her husband.

Although her husband often features in her videos, his face is never shown nor has his name ever been revealed, instead going by nicknames based on their current relationship status: initially German Boyfriend, then German Fiancé, and currently German Husband. Uyen was included on YouTube's 2023 Creators on the Rise list. In 2024, Uyen Ninh took up crochet, posting videos of her progress with the hobby.

In 2025, the German Embassy in Hanoi, AHK Vietnam, and the Goethe-Institut started the Viet-Duc: 20 Faces, 20 Stories campaign to celebrate 50 years of Germany–Vietnam relations. It consists of 20 portraits taken by photographer Birgit Kleber of people related to German-Vietnamese culture. The pictures were exhibited on the walls of the German Embassy in Hanoi. Uyen's portrait was one of the ones taken for the campaign.

== Filmography ==
Year	Title	Notes
2024–2026	Culture Cuddles	Podcast
2023	Galileo	TV series, episode 190
