= Vietnamese people in Germany =

Việt kiều Đức (Vietnamese); Vietnamesen in Deutschland (German)
- Distribution of Vietnamese in Germany (2021)

Total population
- 227,000 (2024)

Regions with significant populations
- Berlin · Leipzig · Magdeburg · Rostock · Erfurt · Dresden · Hanover · Munich

Languages
- Vietnamese, German

Religion
- Vietnamese folk religion, Mahayana Buddhism, Roman Catholicism and Protestantism

Related ethnic groups
- Vietnamese people in Bulgaria, Vietnamese people in the Czech Republic, Vietnamese people in Russia, and other overseas Vietnamese

Vietnamese people in Germany (Vietnamese: Việt kiều Đức / Người Việt tại Đức; German: Vietnamesen in Deutschland) form one of the country's largest groups of resident foreigners from Asia. Federal Statistical Office figures show 103,260 Vietnamese nationals residing in Germany at the end of 2020, which is the fourth largest community from Asia excluding transcontinental, Caucusus and Middle Eastern states. Not included in those figures are individuals of Vietnamese origin or descent who have been naturalised as German citizens. Other data from 2020 shows 183,000 people of Vietnamese descent, of which 117,000 have a migration background.

Between 1981 and 2007, 41,499 people renounced Vietnamese citizenship to take up German nationality. A further 40,000 irregular migrants of Vietnamese origin were estimated to live in Germany, largely concentrated in the Eastern states, as of 2005.

== Migration history ==
=== West Germany ===
==== Arrival of the boat people ====
The Vietnamese community in West Germany consists of refugees from the Vietnam War. The first of the boat people who fled the country after the fall of Saigon via the South China Sea to Malaysia, where they were denied entry, consisting of 208 families totalling 640 individuals who had fled on board the Hai Hong, arrived in Hanover on 3 December 1978 by plane, after Lower Saxony became the first state to accept Vietnamese refugees. Many of them fled Vietnam on small fishing boats with the hope of getting rescued by foreign ships. The Cap Anamur was the most notable rescue ship from West Germany during the Crisis, funded mainly by donations, the ship saved over 10,375 people by the end of the 13th rescue mission which is also the last one in 1986. People without family members overseas or with fully unified families rescued by West German ships were forced to seek refuge in West Germany. Many refused and wanted to go to the US instead, but were denied. None spoke German at the time of their arrival.

==== Pre-reunification ====
The first refugees were accepted into Lower Saxony. Most were first held at the Friedland refugee facility near to the East Germany border before their relocation in their new homes. Most stayed there for a few weeks before being relocated elsewhere. Several factors aided their social and economic integration into German society. They received official aid in the form of social benefits and job placement assistance, as well as broader societal support for their successful adaptation to German life. A lot of donations went on to help them establish themselves. Further, unlike other migrant groups, they knew that they had no option to return to their country of origin if they failed in their adopted land. They spread out through a variety of economic sectors, but were somewhat concentrated in the metal industry. By the eve of German reunification, West Germany had roughly 33,000 Vietnamese immigrants, largely consisting of boat people and their relatives who were admitted under family reunification schemes. The group was well integrated into German Society.

=== East Germany ===
==== Northern Vietnamese migrants ====
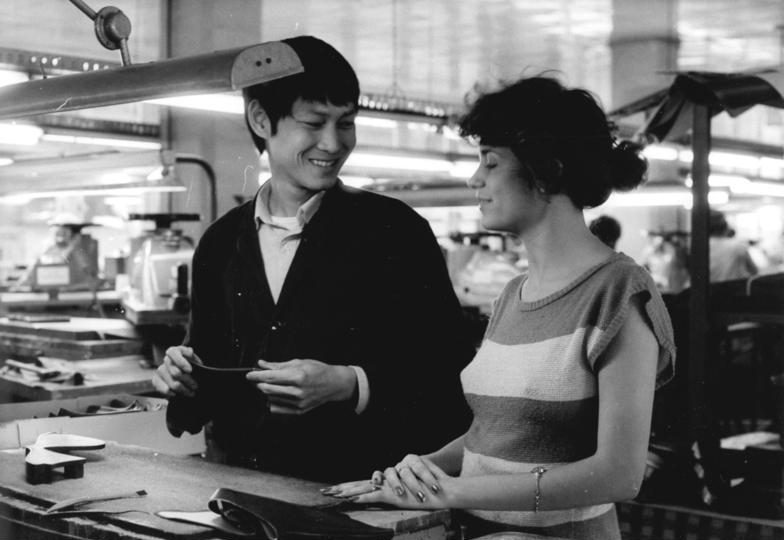
Guest worker in Erfurt, 1989

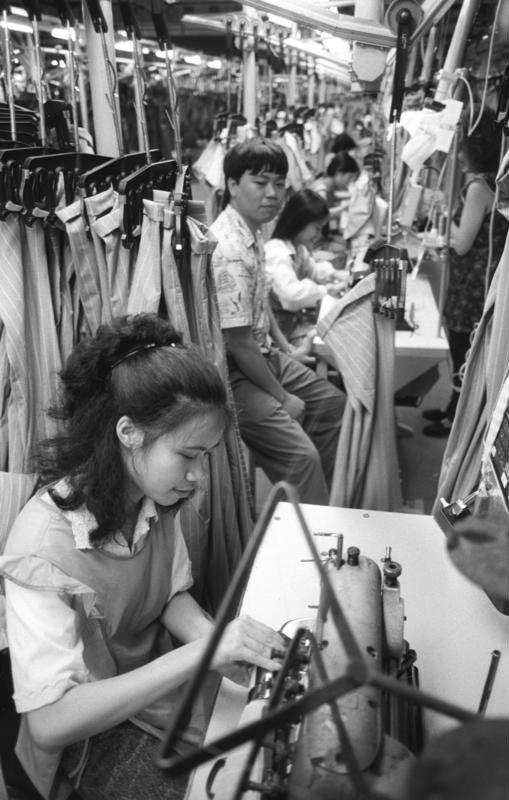
Garment workers in Rostock, 1990

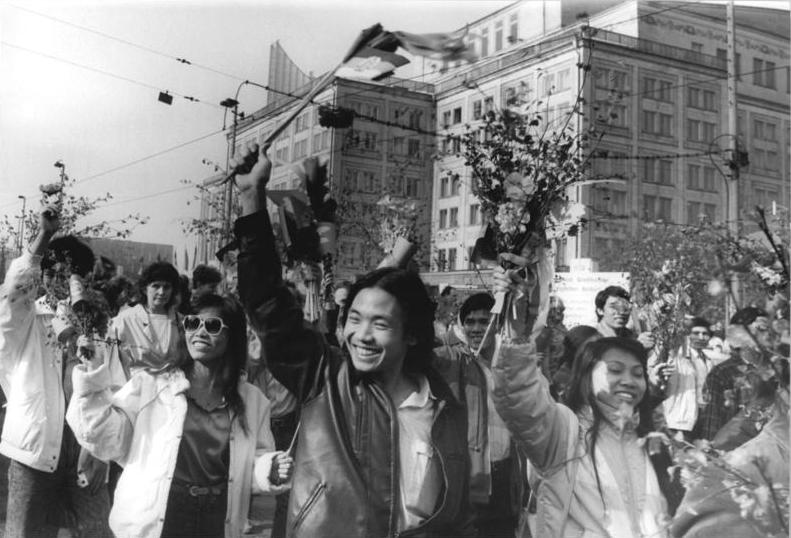
Vietnamese guest workers at a parade in Leipzig, former DDR, c.1980

East Germany began to invite North Vietnamese students to attend study and training programmes there as early as the 1950s; cooperation expanded in 1973, when they pledged to train a further 10,000 Vietnamese citizens in the following ten years. In 1980, they signed an agreement with the reunified Socialist Republic of Vietnam for enterprises in East Germany to provide training to Vietnamese; between 1987 and 1989. The East German government viewed industrial trainee programmes not just as a means to increase the labour supply to local industry, but also as development aid to the poorer members of the socialist bloc. By the mid-1980s, Vietnamese, along with Mozambicans, comprised the main groups of foreign labourers in the GDR. From a population of just 2,482 in 1980, the number of Vietnamese residents of East Germany grew to 59,053 by 1989, with the largest influx in 1987 and 1988. They were concentrated mainly in Karl-Marx-Stadt, Dresden, Erfurt, East Berlin, and Leipzig. Their contracts were supposed to last for five years, after which they would return home.

==== Pre-reunification ====
Vietnamese guest workers received salaries of roughly M400/month, of which 12% went to the government of Vietnam, and another portion was paid in consumer goods—mainly sewing machines, bicycles, clothes, sugar, and soap—instead of cash, due to inflation. In terms of their relations to mainstream society, the Vietnamese guest workers of the GDR differed from the boat people in the west: they were citizens of their country of origin, rather than refugees from it, and they were prohibited from developing personal relationships with GDR citizens despite the official rhetoric of socialist brotherhood. They were formally blocked from integration: all areas of their lives were regulated by government regulations, and pregnancies among female Vietnamese workers were punished by forced abortions. They were sometimes subject to xenophobic violence, and even when their physical safety was maintained, they became the target of resentment due to their preferential access to consumer goods. Despite their socialist indoctrination, many helped their families to become capitalists and better off, using raw materials and sewing machines sent back to Vietnam to privately produce fashionable clothing, such as imitation stone-washed jeans, and sell it to their neighbours.

=== Post-reunification ===
==== Repatriation attempts & Eastern European arrivals ====
After German reunification, the German government sought to reduce the populations of former guest workers in the east by offering each DM3,000 to leave the country and return home. Tens of thousands took this offer, but they were soon replaced by a further influx of Vietnamese asylum-seekers who had been employed as contract workers in other Eastern European nations, mainly from Poland and Czechoslovakia. Because of this, the Vietnamese communities in Central European countries grew a strong connection with each other. Throughout the 1990s, German attempts to repatriate the new immigrants back to their country of origin were not particularly successful, due to both Berlin's reluctance to forcibly deport them, and Hanoi's refusal to re-admit them; however, nearly two-fifths were barred from permanent residency in Germany.

=== Nowadays ===
The new group of Vietnamese migrants that have come in recent years are mainly coming because of educational and economic reasons. This new group is young and mainly come from Central Vietnam.

== Demography and distribution ==
Distribution of Vietnamese nationals in Germany

Vietnamese nationals make up Germany's 15th largest non-EU community, seventh largest from Asia and fourth largest from Asia excluding the Middle East, after Afghans, Indians and Chinese.

=== Age & gender ===
The population pyramid of Vietnamese Germans is very unusual. Vietnamese Vertragsarbeiter or contracted workers, who fell pregnant during their stay in the GDR, were subjected to forced Abortion or forced Deportation, most second generation Vietnamese are born after 1989 because of this. The Vietnamese population in Germany is fairly young compared to the average and to other minority groups; 25% consist of children 15 and under, 63% are between the ages of 15 and 45, with only 10% in the 45-65 age bracket and 2% over the age of 65.

Vietnamese, along with Koreans, form one of the few Asian groups in which men and women migrated to Germany in roughly equal numbers, at least among legal residents; in contrast, there are far more Thai and Filipino women than men in Germany, while the reverse holds true for Chinese and Indians.

=== Distribution ===
The Vietnamese population lives mainly in Northern Germany, with large concentrations in Eastern states.

==== Berlin ====
Around 20,000 live in Berlin, of whom roughly one-quarter belong to the Hoa ethnic group (descendants of Chinese immigrants to Vietnam), although evidence suggests that there are an additional 23,000 illegal Vietnamese migrants living here. Berlin has a Vietnamese market called Dong Xuan Center in Lichtenberg.

==== West Germany ====
Lower Saxony still holds the largest Vietnamese diaspora in West Germany. Most are concentrated by the North Sea Region. Hannover has a vibrant Vietnamese community, consisting of a around 10,000-20,000 and Braunschweig, the second largest city in the state, has an estimated community made up of roughly 5,000-12,000 Vietnamese. The Vietnamese of West Germany are more likely to hold German citizenship than their Eastern counterparts, their numbers are therefore not as clear.

Other West German states also hold decent amounts of Vietnamese people, with the city of Munich alone being home of over 5,100 ethnic Vietnamese. The Vietnamese often live in large cities as most prefer the robust atmosphere of it.

==== East Germany ====
Overall, East Germany has a much larger Vietnamese community, owing to the large number of foreign workers in GDR times. The Vietnamese of East Germany have a tighter connection to the Vietnamese in Eastern Europe and in Vietnam.

There was significant emigration of the population from East to West following reunification. Many lost their jobs in the East, leading to them to head West in hopes of better economic opportunities.

Saxony, Saxony-Anhalt and Thuringia are states in the East with significant populations of ethnic Vietnamese. The Vietnamese are the largest minority group in the state of Saxony Anhalt, the third largest in Thuringia and the fourth largest in Saxony. Out of the 3,500 foreign students in Saxony Anhalt, over 700 of them are Vietnamese nationals.

The population of Vietnamese in these states is growing at a fast speed.

Mecklenburg-Vorpommern had a large Vietnamese population. After the pogroms and violence in the 90s, most of the Vietnamese moved to other states of Germany. The Vietnamese community here is mostly concentrated in the city of Rostock.

Number of Vietnamese in larger cities
#	City	People
1.	Berlin	20,572
2.	Munich	6,350
3.	Leipzig	3,630
4.	Hamburg	2,863
5.	Hanover	2,183
6.	Braunschweig	2,076
7.	Dresden	1,860
8.	Frankfurt	1,460
9.	Chemnitz	1,372
10.	Nuremberg	1,299
11.	Magdeburg	1,194
12.	Erfurt	1,072
13.	Halle	974
14.	Düsseldorf	879
15.	Rostock	769
16.	Potsdam	653

== Employment ==
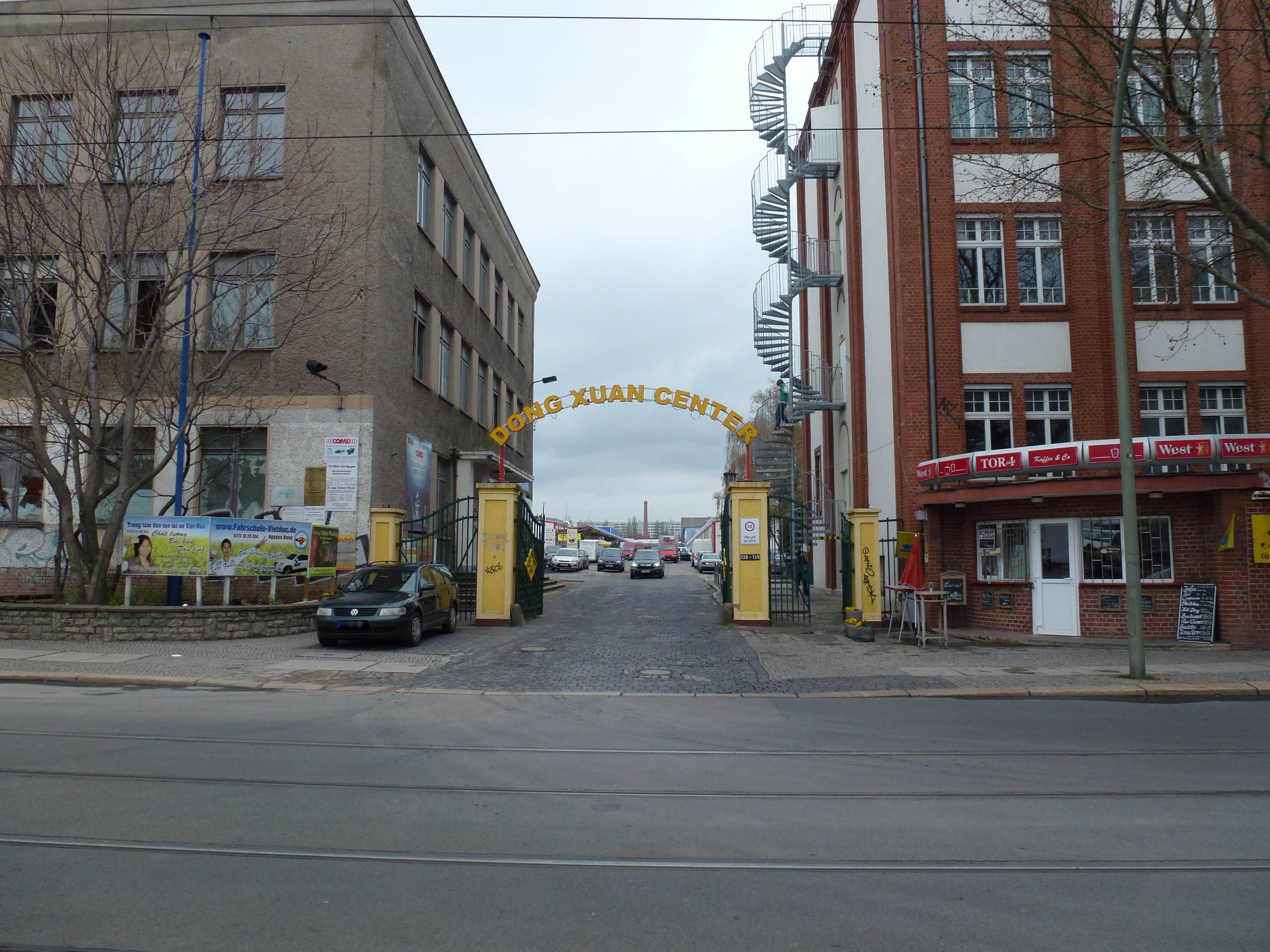
Dong Xuan Center in Berlin-Lichtenberg

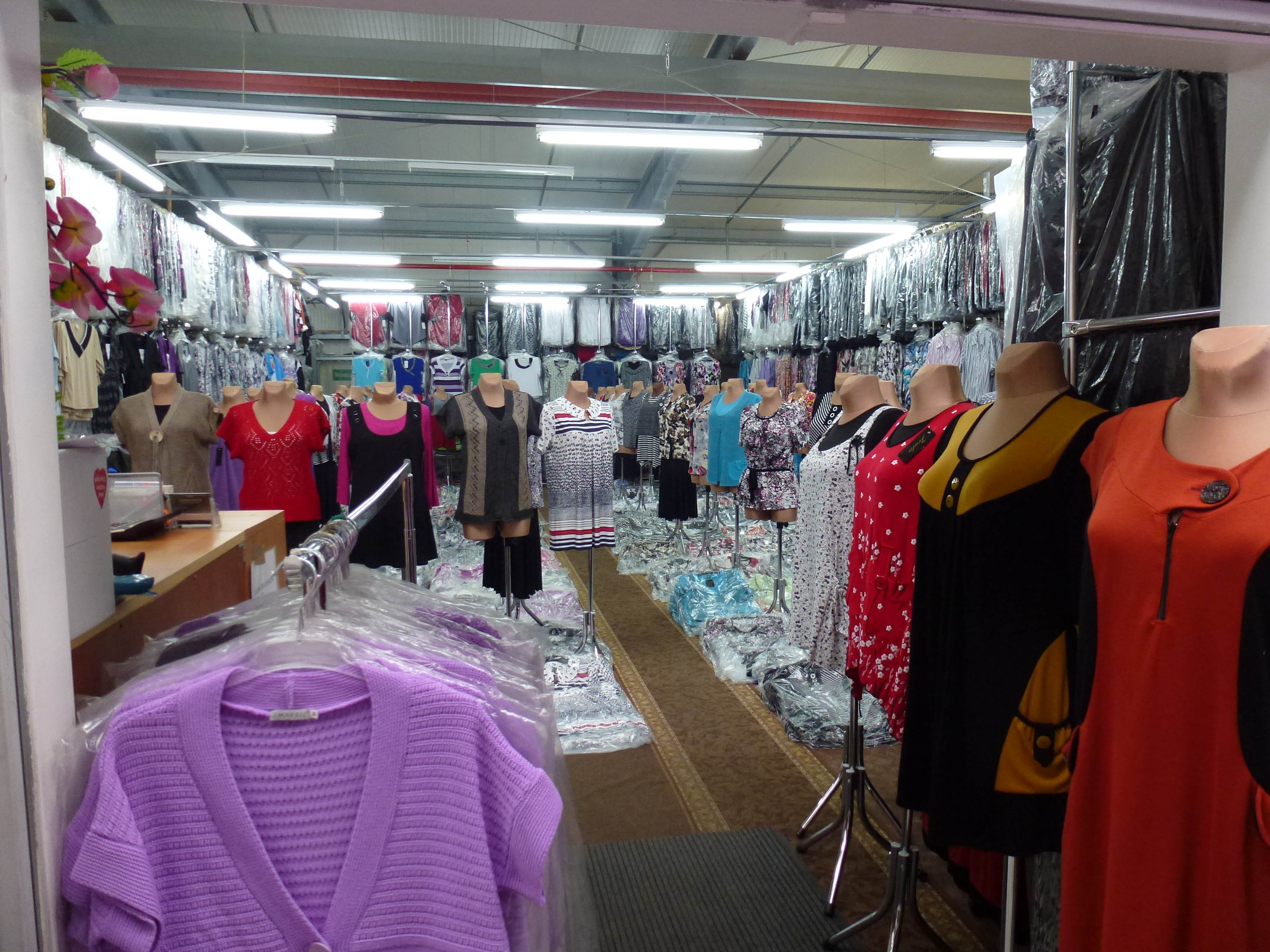
A shop in Dong Xuan Center

=== Post-reunification in the East ===
==== Berlin ====
With the loss of their jobs, many Vietnamese guest workers turned to street vending, especially of smuggled cigarettes, while others subsisted on meagre unemployment benefits. Media portrayals of cigarette vendors were initially sympathetic, but by 1993, increasingly emphasised their link with organised crime. Cigarette vendors were subject to frequent police abuse; in Berlin, some Vietnamese residents even started a street fight with a police officer who frequently beat up one cigarette vendor, and threatened to hold a protest and block traffic to bring attention to the issue. By mid-1994, discussion of the police abuse of Vietnamese dominated local media; more than 85 investigations were opened against police officers in Berlin and surrounding areas, but in the end, only five officers were punished.

==== Rest of East Germany ====
After the 1993 announcement that only those who had a legal means of financial support would be able to receive a residence permit, even more former guest workers, with little hope of achieving professional employment due to their poor German language skills, turned to self-employment. Floral stands and grocery stores were two common business choices. Others imported cheap products from Vietnam, especially garments, and sold them in small family-scale businesses; however, they could not compete with large discount retailers. By 2004, out of the 3,000 registered Vietnamese of Leipzig, 1/5th of them were self-employed.

Due to the economic pressures on small retailers, the number of unemployed Vietnamese in Germany has shown an upward trend, rising to 1,057 individuals in 2000. The unemployment rate is much lower outside of Berlin, as the competition is not as fierce due to the smaller population.

=== West Germany ===
In the west, reunification didn't affect the Vietnamese population as much as the Easterners. They have a relatively stable life at this point, with most working in factories or being self-employed.

=== The next generation ===
The second and third generations of these Vietnamese immigrants have thrived, achieving strong academic success and entering high-paying professions, particularly in healthcare and education.

== Education ==
2008 studies by German education experts show that Vietnamese children are among the highest performing pupils in Germany (59% gaining entry into Gymnasium). News articles have drawn attention to how children of former guest-workers are among the highest performing pupils in German schools. Vietnamese students in Germany who grow up in poverty typically outperform their peers, such as the Turks and Italians, and even native Germans (43%).

Many link these high academical achievements with the hard-working culture and strict parenting of the Vietnamese.

By the time they finish school, Vietnamese students are more likely to be trilingual or even quadrilingual and be able to play an instrument.

== Racism ==
=== Racism in Eastern Germany ===
Tensions between Germans and Vietnamese broke out into violence beginning on 22 August 1992 in the northeastern city of Rostock, Mecklenburg-Vorpommern, where neo-Nazis attacked Romani people, and then, on the third day of the riots, set fire to a housing complex where over 100 Vietnamese asylum-seekers lived. Some were injured, but none died; the police evacuated the Vietnamese residents but took no action against their attackers. A week later, extremist demonstrators burned a tent city in Berlin. Though some local residents cheered them on in Rostock, the rest of Germany was far more critical of their actions; 15,000 leftists staged a march through Rostock to condemn the violence. Rostock's mayor, Klaus Kilimann, remained out of town on holiday until the third day of the crisis, and was blamed for exacerbating the situation by not ordering the police into action earlier; he in turn blamed state officials, but after continuing pressure, finally resigned in late 1993.

== Cigarette gangs ==
=== Berlin's gangs ===
Back in the 1990s, organized crime was a prominent issue after German reunification, mainly consisting of Vietnamese from the former German Democratic Republic, with about half a dozen Vietnamese street gangs competing over the Berlin area alone in 1996, each with about 150 members. In the first 5 months of the year, there were 15 recorded contract killings between Vietnamese-German organized crime in Berlin. Their criminal enterprises, at first primarily related to the highly lucrative black market in untaxed cigarettes, have also branched out to gambling, prostitution, and video and audio piracy. In 1994, Vietnam agreed to accept deported criminal guest workers in exchange for US$65 million in development assistance, but by the end of the year only 67 had been deported instead of the agreed number of 2,500. Some investigators believed that the Party Central Committee in Hanoi was reluctant to accept too many deported criminals because of alleged political corruption and collusion between Vietnamese organized crime in the Federal Republic of Germany and high-ranking Vietnamese government officials and military officers.

== Internal divisions ==
Even after the reunification of their host country, the Vietnamese community in Germany remains divided. Initial sympathy by southerners towards northerners was replaced by suspicion. The former boat people are also far better integrated into society, and speak German well. However, the children of the boat people retain only tenuous links to Vietnamese culture; in many cases, their parents spoke to them in German rather than Vietnamese, with the hope of speeding their integration; as a result, the parents' German improved with the constant practise, while the children's Vietnamese skills atrophied. In contrast, many of the former guest workers from East Germany speak German poorly.

== Religion ==
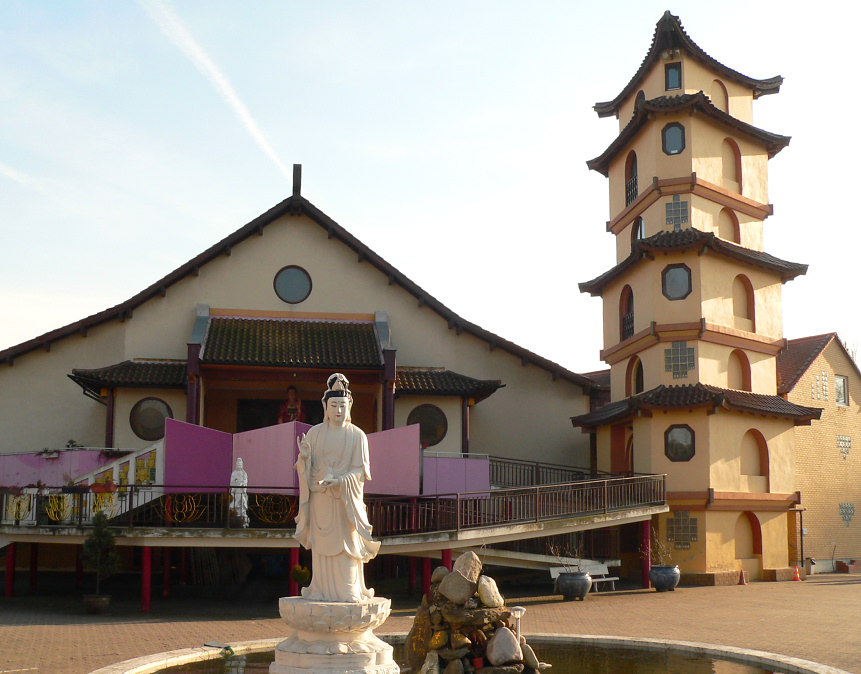
Viên Giác pagoda, Vietnamese pagoda in Hannover

=== Buddhism ===
The majority of Vietnamese migrants in Germany are at least nominal Buddhists. Vietnamese-style Buddhist temples they have set up serve as one of the most noticeable marks of their presence in the country, the most notable example being Lower Saxony's Vien Giac, one of the largest Buddhist pagodas in Europe. The temples, as well as street parades staged during important festivals, thus serve as important focal points for identity formation among Vietnamese Buddhists in Germany, and a sign that they are making themselves feel at home in their adopted country. At the same time, however, the temples and their visibility in public space have provoked backlash from German neighbours, who feel they are a symbol of non-assimilation to German society.

=== Christians ===
Catholics form a smaller community; as of May 1999, there were 12,000 Vietnamese Catholics in Germany, according to the statistics of the Conference of the German Bishops.

There is also a small group practising Protestantism in North-Western Germany consisting of about 10,000.

The Vietnamese Christian population is growing, due to the efforts of Christian missionaries.

== Notable people ==
This is a list of notable Vietnamese expatriates in Germany and German citizens of Vietnamese origin or descent.

- Philipp Rösler, Vice-Chancellor of Germany, Federal Minister of Economics and Technology and chairman of the Free Democratic Party
- Dang Ngoc Long, composer and actor
- Dan Nguyen, field hockey for the German national team
- Marcel Nguyen, Olympic gymnast, 2012 silver medallist in all-around
- Kim Bùi, Olympic gymnast
- Jenny-Mai Nguyen, author of fantasy novels
- Nguyễn Ngọc Kiều Khanh, beauty pageant contestant
- Minh-Khai Phan-Thi, actor and television presenter
- Mai Thi Nguyen-Kim, science communicator, television presenter and YouTuber, chemist
- Trong Hieu, singer and dancer
- Yung Ngo, actor at Schauspiel Frankfurt
- Kenneth Schmidt, footballer
- Uyen Ninh, internet celebrity and content creator

== See also ==
- Germany–Vietnam relations
- Vietnamese diaspora
- Immigration to Germany
