= VinaCapital Vietnam Opportunity Fund =

British investment trust

- Type: Public company
- Traded as: LSE: VOF; FTSE 250 component
- Industry: Investment management
- Founded: 2003; 23 years ago
- Headquarters: Ho Chi Minh City, Vietnam
- Key people: Huw Evans (Chairman), Khanh Vu (Lead Portfolio Manager)
- Products: investment trust
- Total assets: $1,097.1 million (2024)
- Website: vinacapital.com/investment-solutions/offshore-funds/vof/overview/

VinaCapital Vietnam Opportunity Fund is a British investment trust dedicated to investments in capital markets, private equity, undervalued assets, privatised assets, property and private placements in Vietnam. It is managed by VinaCapital. After transferring from the Alternative Investment Market to a full listing in March 2016, the company went on to become a constituent of the FTSE 250 Index. The Chairman is Huw Evans and Khanh Vu is the Lead Portfolio Manager, assuming the role previously held by Andy Ho, who died in June 2024.

As of 2024, VOF's net asset value was $1,097.1 million, with a market capitalization of $840.1 million.

== Top Holdings ==
As of December 31, 2024, VOF's top ten holdings were:

Company name	Ticker	Percentage of net asset value
Asia Commercial Bank	HOSE: ACB	13.8%
FPT Corporation	HOSE: FPT	12.6%
Khang Dien House	HOSE: KDH	11.7%
Airports Corporation of Vietnam	UPCoM: ACV	7.4%
Hoa Phat Group	HOSE: HPG	7.2%
Tam Tri Hospital	Private Equity	4.5%
Phu Nhuan Jewelry	HOSE: PNJ	4.3%
Vietnam Prosperity Bank	HOSE: VPM	3.5%
IN Holdings	Private Equity	3.5%
Thu Cuc Hospital	Private Equity	3.4%
