= Horst Geicke =

German entrepreneur and investor

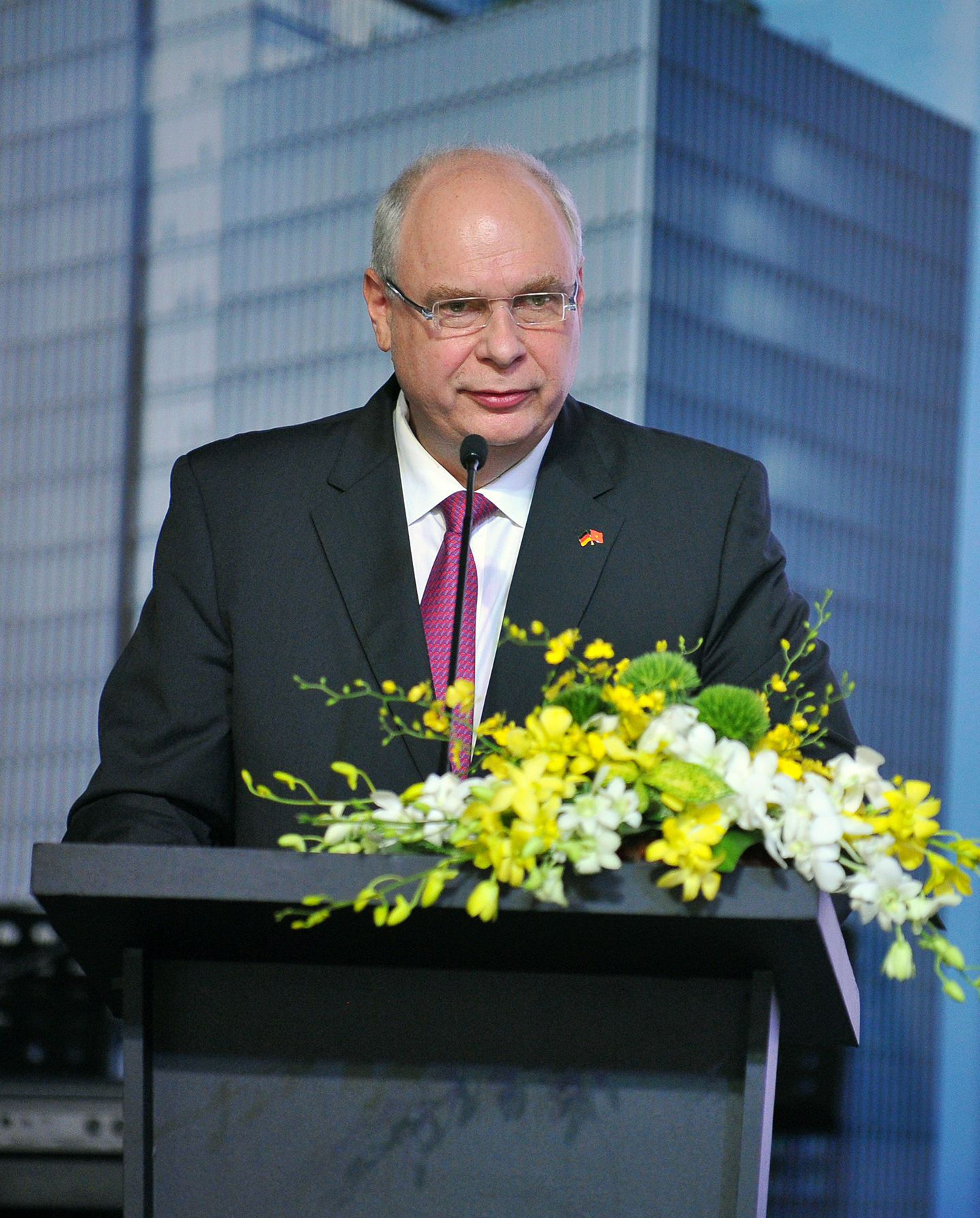
- Horst Geicke at the Topping Out Ceremony of Deutsches Haus Ho Chi Minh City
- Born: 1955 (age 70–71); Hamburg, Germany
- Education: University of Hamburg
- Occupations: PAG (Founder); VinaCapital (Founder)

Horst Joachim Franz Geicke (born 1955 in Hamburg) is a German-born entrepreneur, investor and official in Asia who has lived in Hong Kong and Vietnam since the 1980s. In Hong Kong, he is co-founder, partner and former executive chairman of the investment firm PAG and known as chairman of the German and the European Chamber of Commerce. In Vietnam, he is investor, chairman and CEO of the Deutsches Haus Ho Chi Minh City and known as founder and executive chairman of the VinaCapital Group.

== Life and career ==
Geicke studied Business Administration and Business Law at the University of Hamburg and moved to Hong Kong in 1981 to be a successful entrepreneur with export-oriented manufacturing companies in China. Later, he focused on investments, particularly in real estate along Richard Li and others. He is known as an early investor in China as well as in Vietnam and with this expertise mentioned in newspapers. In Hong Kong, Geicke co-founded the investment management firm PAG and was the executive chairman from 2002 to 2010. In Vietnam, he founded the investment management firm VinaCapital Group and was the chairman from 2003 to 2012. In 2015 he was ranked 270 of the richest Germans by Manager Magazin.

Geicke is known as investor, chairman and CEO of the Deutsches Haus Ho Chi Minh City. The building complex with an investment of $130 million consists of two towers and was opened 2017. It was initiated under a bilateral government agreement between Germany and Vietnam. The centrally located property had been purchased in 1960 by the German government for “diplomatic purposes” and was never used. In the 2010s, Geicke received the right to erect the towers from the German government and developed the concept with the Vietnamese authorities and the German federal ministries. Geicke had previously acquired federal property in Hong Kong.

Since 2018 Geicke is on the Board of Directors of English League club Oxford United and occasionally comments on the situation of the club.

== Business communities and charity work ==
Geicke is an active member of business communities. In Hong Kong, he was chairman of the German and European Chamber of Commerce. He is also president of the Hong Kong-Vietnam Chamber of Commerce and board member of other organizations.

In Vietnam, he founded the charity VinaCapital Foundation which is engaged in the social sector, such as the financing of cardiac surgery as a late consequence of the Vietnam War (“Heartbeat Vietnam”).
