= Vietnamese community of Berlin =

Total population
- 40,000 (1,16% of total population); 12,814 Vietnam-born people with only Vietnamese citizenship, 20,000 with German citizenship or born in Berlin

Regions with significant populations
- Berlin; Lichtenberg, Mitte, Marzahn-Hellersdorf, Wedding, Moabit, Neukölln

Languages
- German · Vietnamese

Religion
- predominantly Buddhism

Related ethnic groups
- Vietnamese people in Germany

Vietnamese people are Berlin's largest South East Asian community, comprising 1.16% of the total population. Areas and localities with significant populations are mostly in the former East Berlin, for instance, Lichtenberg, where people of Vietnamese origin make up 11.8% of the population. Other areas with large numbers of Vietnamese are Mitte, Marzahn-Hellersdorf, and Neukölln.

As of 2014 the German Federal Foreign Office estimated that Berlin had 20,000 Vietnamese people, the largest group of East Asians in Germany. Many Vietnamese operate Spätkauf (late night convenience stores in Berlin), flower shops, and restaurants in the city.

== History ==
In the 1980s, Vietnamese immigrants came to East Berlin as temporary contract workers (Vertragsarbeiter), as part of a deal between the East German government and the government of Vietnam. South Vietnamese who fled the Vietnam War instead came to West Berlin.

Many Vietnamese remained in Berlin even though they lost their legal residence statuses and jobs after the fall of the Berlin Wall in 1989. The residence permits of other Vietnamese only permitted them to live in East Germany, even after reunification. In the 1990s many Vietnamese who lived in the now-unified Berlin began establishing small businesses. Vietnamese who lived in other parts of former East Germany, such as Chemnitz, Leipzig, and Rostock, moved to Berlin after the fall of the Berlin Wall.

== Geography ==
As of 2014 many Vietnamese live in Lichtenberg, Marzahn, and other neighborhoods which had housing for Vietnamese contract workers during the East German era.

== Ethnicity ==
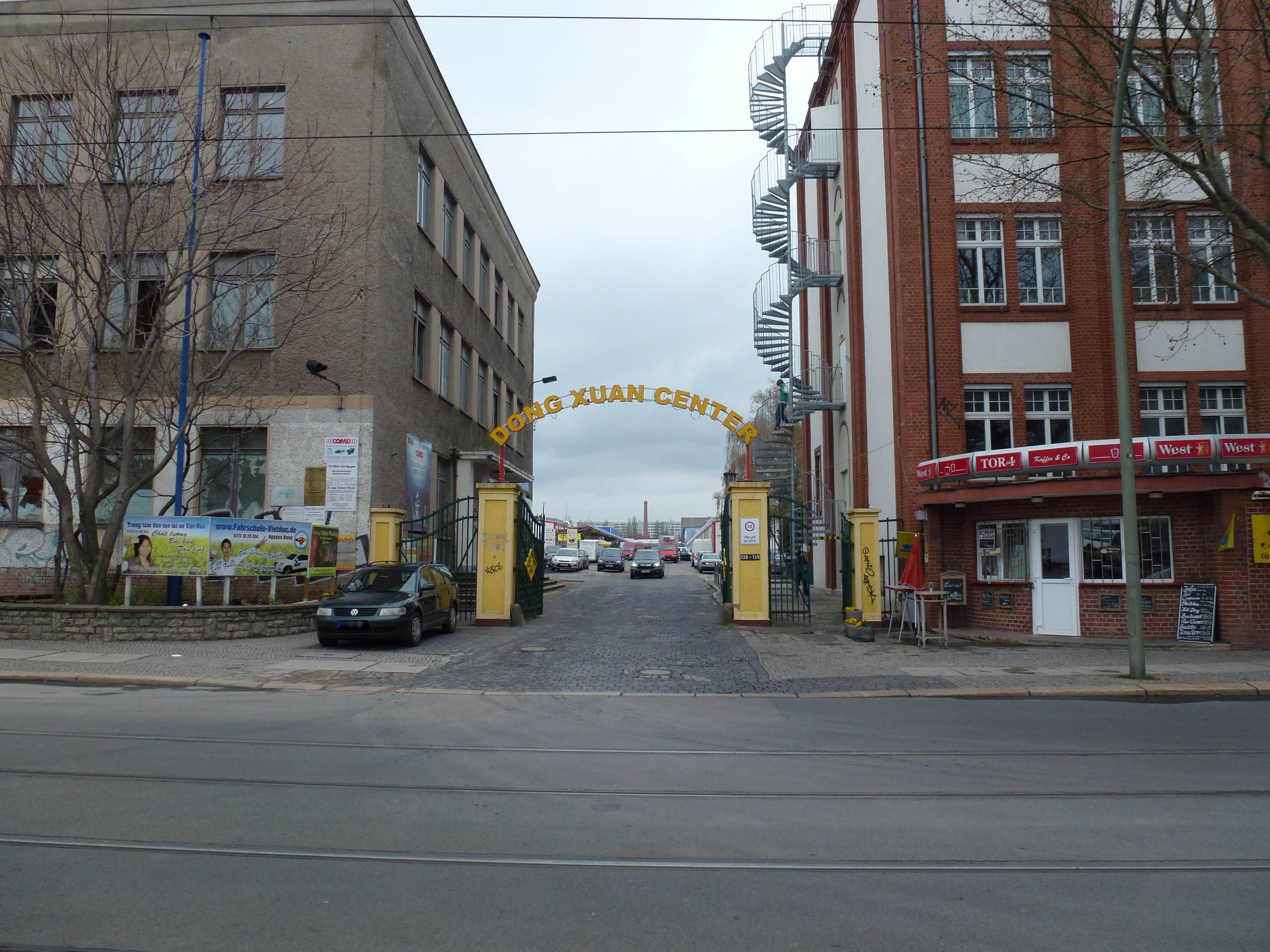
Dong Xuan Center in Berlin-Lichtenberg

The Vietnamese community is not a homogenous one, because one quarter of Vietnamese migrants in Berlin and Germany are Hoa (a Chinese minority in Vietnam). The rest mostly consist of Hmong and Kinh.

== Economy ==
Dong Xuan Market in Lichtenberg is the centre of Vietnamese economic activity in the city.

The first major Vietnamese restaurant to offer Pho in Berlin was Monsieur Vuong; after its opening more Germans began patronizing Vietnamese restaurants. Prior to Monsieur Vuong's opening, Berlin restaurants operated by Vietnamese had fusion cuisine with Thai influences.
