= Germany–Vietnam relations =

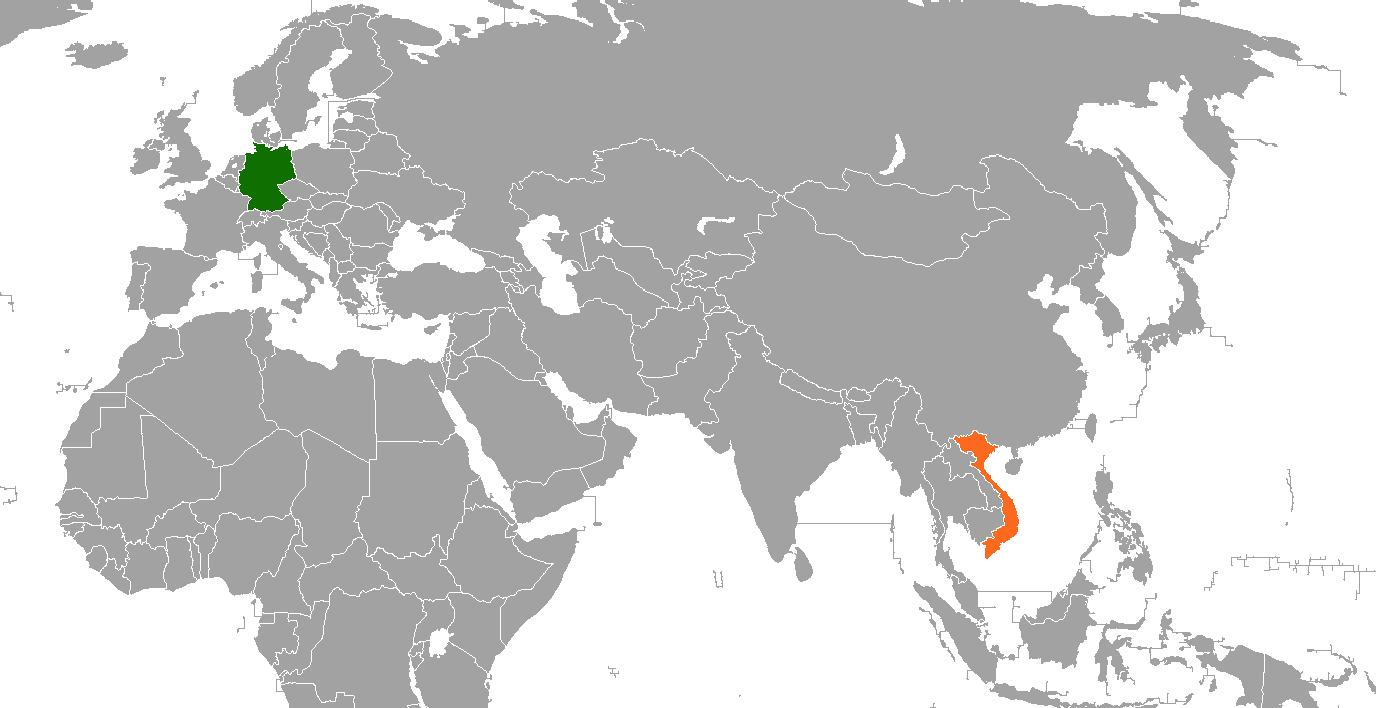

- Germany: Vietnam

Germany–Vietnam relations are the bilateral relations between Germany and Vietnam.

Germany has an embassy in Hanoi and a consulate general in Ho Chi Minh City, while Vietnam has an embassy in Berlin and a consulate general in Frankfurt.

== History ==
=== World War I ===
During the first 6 months of World War I the government-general of French Indochina expelled all German and Austro-Hungarian people living in French Indochina.

The two largest pre-war import/export houses, Speidel & Co. and F. Engler & Co., were German companies which caused them to be officially re-organised as French companies, however in reality they continued to operate under both German control and using German capital. During the 1910s Speidel & Co. was the largest importer of European goods into the country with Engler being one of its major competitors. After the German owners were expulsed from the company lower level employees tried to continue running these companies despite increasing push back from the French colonial authorities by means of arbitrary customs enforcement, freight interference, and regulatory aggravations. Later the French would seize all of the German Speidel Company's warehouses and would sell the seized goods at low prices both to Vietnamese consumers and Chinese exporters to try and increase revenue. These goods included rice, wine, and canned goods.

=== Vietnam War ===
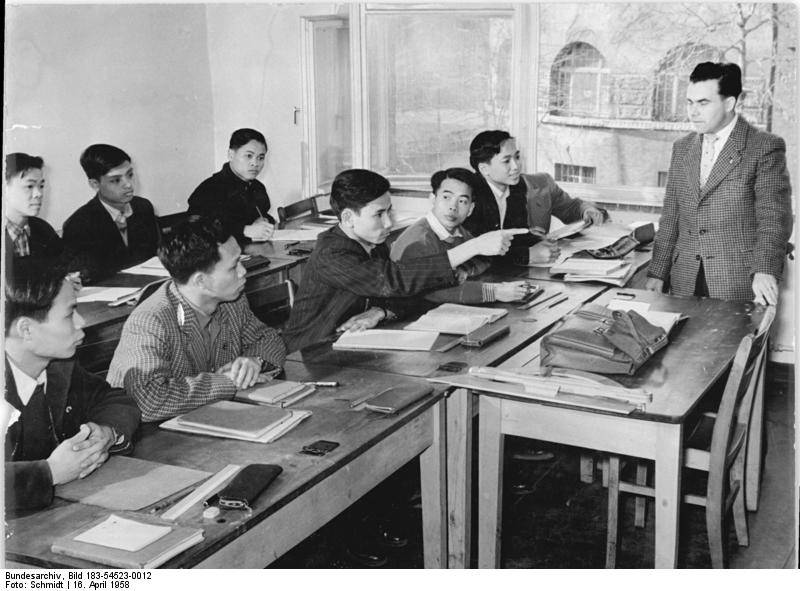
Vietnamese students in Leipzig (1958)

East Germany (GDR) established diplomatic contacts with socialist North Vietnam and supported them with humanitarian and financial aid during the Vietnam War, whereas West Germany supported South Vietnam. Under the slogan “Solidarity with Vietnam” against the “imperialist aggressor” (the US), numerous GDR citizens provided aid. In 1968, for example, 50,000 trade unionists donated blood in a relief operation. The Stasi also helped to build up the North Vietnamese secret service. After the reunification of Vietnam, the close relationship continued. Due to an acute shortage of workers, the GDR and Vietnam signed a contract in April 1980 for the dispatch of contract workers. In return for the provision of development aid amounting to one billion East German marks, Vietnam subsequently sent 200,000 guest workers to the GDR. The GDR was also able to import scarce goods such as coffee, tea, rubber and pepper from Vietnam. In 1989, the year of reunification, the 60,000 Vietnamese in the country were the largest group of foreigners in the GDR.

West Germany supported the US in the Vietnam War, but didn't send troops. In 1967, the German chemical and pharmaceutical company Boehringer Ingelheim supplied 720 tons of trichlorophenolate lye to a subsidiary of Dow Chemical in New Zealand, which the company used to produce Agent Orange for the Vietnam War. The sale was made public in 1991 by a report in Der Spiegel and confirmed by Boehringer Ingelheim another year later.

=== After 1990 ===
Relations between the two countries improved after the Đổi Mới reforms and German reunification, and development aid in the areas of education, energy and the environment as well as economic relations were resumed. From the very beginning, the most important priority areas of development cooperation between the Federal Republic of Germany and Vietnam were the promotion of economic reforms and the development of a market economy. German companies became increasingly active in Vietnam.

In October 2011, German Chancellor Angela Merkel and Vietnamese Prime Minister Nguyễn Tấn Dũng signed the "Hanoi Declaration", establishing a Strategic Partnership between Germany and Vietnam that is designed to strengthen political, economic and cultural relations and development cooperation. As part of increased political cooperation, there is a exchange between Germany and Vietnam at all levels. Since 2011, more meetings have been held to improve cooperation on project funding, including in the areas of political-strategic dialog, business, trade and investment, justice and law, development cooperation and environmental protection, education, science, technology, culture, media and society.

=== 2017 kidnapping of Trịnh Xuân Thanh ===
In 2017, Trịnh Xuân Thanh, a former communist party member and businessman who was accused of being corrupt, was secretly abducted and kidnapped in Berlin by a group of unnamed Vietnamese personnel believed to be Vietnamese agents in Germany. In response, Germany accused Vietnam for "violating the territorial rights of Germany" and ordered a total expulsion of a number of Vietnamese foreign officials in Germany. Germany also suspended Vietnamese workers from going to Germany to start for investigation.

== Economic relations ==
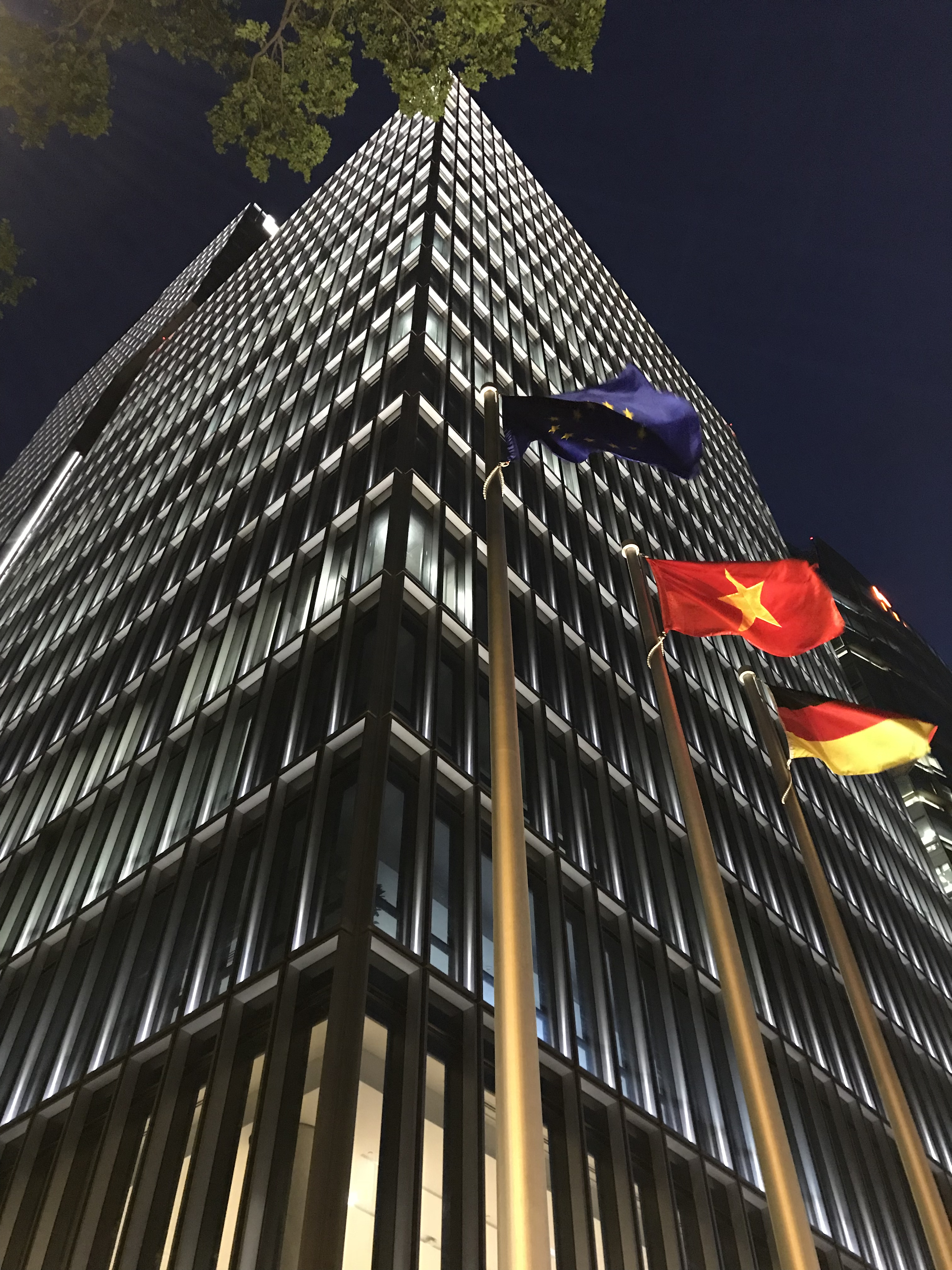
Deutsches Haus Ho Chi Minh City, a building promoting German representation in Vietnam

Vietnam is in the process of ratifying a free trade agreement with the European Union which includes Germany as Europe's largest economy. In 2016, bilateral trade was worth US$10.3 billion. By 2023, total trade had grown to €17.2 billion with a €10.1 billion trade balance in Vietnam's favour.

== Education cooperation ==
The Vietnamese-German University was opened in Ho Chi Minh City in September 2008.

== Diplomatic representatives ==
=== Vietnamese ambassadors to Germany ===
South Vietnam ambassadors to West Germany (in Bonn)

1. Hà Vĩnh Phương (1957–1963, Chargé d'affaires)
2. Phan Văn Thính (1963–1964, Chargé d'affaires)
3. Nguyễn Quí Anh (1964–1968)
4. Nguyễn Duy Liễn (1968–1974)
5. Nguyễn Phương Thiệp (1974–1975, until the Fall of Saigon)

== See also ==
- Vietnamese people in Germany
