= VinaCapital =

Vietnamese financial services firm

- Type: Private limited company
- Industry: Investment management, Asset management, Real estate, Venture capital, clean energy, private equity
- Founded: 2003
- Founders: Horst Geicke; Don Lam
- Headquarters: 115 Nguyen Hue, Ben Nghe Ward, District 1, Ho Chí Minh City, Vietnam
- Key people: Jonathan Choi (Chairman); Don Lam (CEO)
- Products: asset management, investment management
- Website: vinacapital.com

VinaCapital is one of the largest investment management firms in Vietnam. As of 2023, the firm has more than $3.9 billion in assets under management.

== History ==
VinaCapital was founded in 2003 by Don Lam and Horst Geicke, who served as executive chairman until 2012. The company developed a diversified portfolio including several funds and also founded the VinaCapital Foundation, a public charitable organization to empower children and youth in Vietnam such as financing of cardiac surgery.

In 2003, the firm launched the VinaCapital Vietnam Opportunity Fund, a closed-end fund now trading on the London Stock Exchange’s Main Market.

In 2006, VinaCapital and Draper Fisher Jurvetson launched DFJVinaCapital, a venture capital fund to invest in technology companies and privatised telecommunications companies.

In August 2018, VinaCapital launched VinaCapital Ventures, a technology investment platform. In June 2019, the company announced that it had formed a strategic partnership with the Mirae Asset - Naver Asia Growth Fund.

In July 2019, VinaCapital acquired Smartly Pte Ltd., a Singapore-based robo-advisory investment platform, which it wound down in March 2020 due to "intense competition".

VinaCapital was awarded "Best Fund House - Vietnam" by Asia Asset Management magazine in 2018, 2019 and 2020.

In March 2021, the company announced that it would jointly invest with GS Energy to develop a 3,000MW LNG power plant in Long An province. In October 2021, VinaCapital announced that EDF Renewables had made a "significant investment" in its rooftop solar subsidiary, SkyX.

In May 2023, VinaCapital announced that it had formed an infrastructure and logistics investment platform with the fund manager, A.P. Moller Capital.

== Management ==
The current Chairman is Jonathan Choi, the Chairman of Sunwah International in Hong Kong. The CEO is Don Lam, who co-founded the company in 2003 after working at PwC (Vietnam).

== Notable activities ==
VinaCapital's funds include:

- VinaCapital Vietnam Opportunity Fund (VOF) is listed on the London Stock Exchange (LSE: VOF) and a constituent of the FTSE 250 Index.
- DFJ VinaCapital (DFJV) with Draper Fisher Jurvetson
- Forum One - VCG Partners Vietnam Fund, a UCITS-compliant, open-ended fund.
- VinaCapital Equity Special Access Fund (VESAF)
- VinaCapital Insights Balanced fund (VIBF)
- VinaCapital VN100 ETF
- VinaCapital Liquidity Bond Fund (VLBF)
