= Nguyễn Khải Hoàn =

Vietnamese businessman

- Born: January 3, 1975 (age 51); Vietnam
- Occupations: Businessman, philanthropist
- Organization(s): Khải Hoàn Group and Khai Hoan Land (Chairman)
- Known for: Chairman of Khải Hoàn Group and Khai Hoan Land; Pioneering in building company culture named “reading culture”
- Spouse: Trần Thị Thu Hương
- Children: Nguyễn Khải Minh (son); Nguyễn Khải Hưng (son); Nguyễn Khải Trí (son); Nguyễn Khải My (daughter)
- Parents: Nguyễn Khải (father); Nguyễn Thị Bắc (mother)
- Relatives: Nguyễn Thế Khoa (elder brother); Nguyễn Thị Lệ Thúy (elder sister)

Nguyễn Khải Hoàn (born January 3, 1975) is a Vietnamese entrepreneur and philanthropist. He is the founder and Chairman of Khai Hoan Group and Khai Hoan Land. He is also known for the innovative use of "reading culture" as a method of personal and corporate development. His commitment to books and the art of reading have led him to develop a number of charitable and philanthropic projects.

== Personal life ==
Nguyễn Khải Hoàn was born and raised in a family dedicated to arts and culture, while his paternal ancestors are from Nam Dinh and his maternal family is from Hung Yen Province. His father, Nguyễn Khải, was an influential writer of 20th-century Vietnamese literature. Nguyễn Khải Hoàn currently resides in District 7, Ho Chi Minh City. He is married to Trần Thị Thu Hương and has 4 children.

== Career ==
Despite his literary upbringing, Nguyễn Khải Hoàn developed an interest in real estate early on. At the age of 20, he began his real estate management career.

In 2009, Nguyễn Khải Hoàn and five others founded Khai Hoan Land Group Joint Stock Company, specializing in real estate investment, development and brokerage in Ho Chi Minh City and neighboring provinces. As of May 2022, the company amassed an authorized capital of 4,431 billion VND with Nguyễn Khải Hoàn holding 30.61% of the authorized stocks. The other four founders are members of Nguyễn Khải Hoàn’s family, including his brother, sister, and partner Trần Thị Thu Hương, the latter of whom currently has 13.68% of the company’s stocks.

On June 26, 2021, Khai Hoan Land Group Joint Stock Company in Ho Chi Minh reached an agreement with T&T Group to become the sole developer and distributor for all projects under the T&T Group brand in the whole country. The agreement solidified Khai Hoan Land's position as one of the leading housing developers and commercial real estate agencies in Vietnam.

On July 19, 2021, Khai Hoan Land stocks were officially listed on the Ho Chi Minh City Stock Exchange (HOSE) as KHG.

=== Developing a reading culture ===
Beyond business and real estate, Nguyễn Khải Hoàn is passionate about literature and the importance of reading for personal and societal development. He is known for pioneering a widespread reading culture within the company, and has attributed to that culture “the foundation for Khai Hoan Land’s commercial success”. Associates are incentivized to read extensively as part of their professional development, and books have consistently been presented in training courses and award ceremonies and are a major component of charity programs.

== Other ventures ==
Nguyen Khai Hoan has continued his famous father’s literary and humanist values through a number of community projects.

=== “A good person is good for more than a day” ===
Video of actual interview with Nguyen Khai Hoan made by HTV9 and broadcast in the program of Van Nghe Magazine - an interview about creative thinking, innovation, the courage to think for yourself, the courage to follow passions, the challenge of living a positive life, and the special rewards from spreading humanistic values to the community and society.

=== “The stone bench” project ===
Thousands of stone benches with famous quotes have been placed in residential areas across the city. This project is meant to provoke thought if only briefly. As stated by Khải Hoàn, "The aim is to let ideas freely float and some may stick in the minds of the people who pass by. Every quote that is passed from one generation onto the next is the culmination of humanity’s intelligence and soul, the nature of which has the ability to soothe and empower the soul."

=== “Khải Hoàn Bookshelf” Project ===
Khải Hoàn started this project-shelves filled with books placed in many locations- with the goal to continue spreading the reading culture to many small and disadvantaged communities. The larger goal is to help these communities contribute to Vietnam’s socio-educational development by having its members educated, ambitious and forward thinking.

=== Building libraries in disadvantaged communities ===
Nguyễn Khải Hoàn’s longer term goal is to build full libraries in remote and economically disadvantaged communities.

== Family ==
His father Nguyễn Khải, who was awarded the Ho Chi Minh Prize, was one of the notable figures of the post-August Revolution generation of writers.

Nguyễn Khải Hoàn is one of the 100 wealthiest individuals within the Vietnamese stock market. His wife, business-woman Trần Thị Thu Hương, holds 43.6 million KHG stocks with an estimated value of 876.4 billion VND as of December 6, 2021. Similarly, Trần Thị Thu Hương is on the list of the top 200 richest individuals in terms of Vietnamese stock market value.

== Quotes ==
In the end, people don’t care about how much money you made. They care about and respect and admire what you have been able to do for society and humankind. Every entrepreneur builds a business but is also responsible for the path of our society and its future. The success of the first only happens with the success of the second.

Books allow us to travel into the far end of the universe and back in time. They allow us to travel into the minds of others and then into our hearts. Books are as close to magic as we human beings can own.

== See also ==
- Khai Hoan Land
