= Deutsches Haus Ho Chi Minh City =

Buildings in Ho Chi Minh City, Vietnam

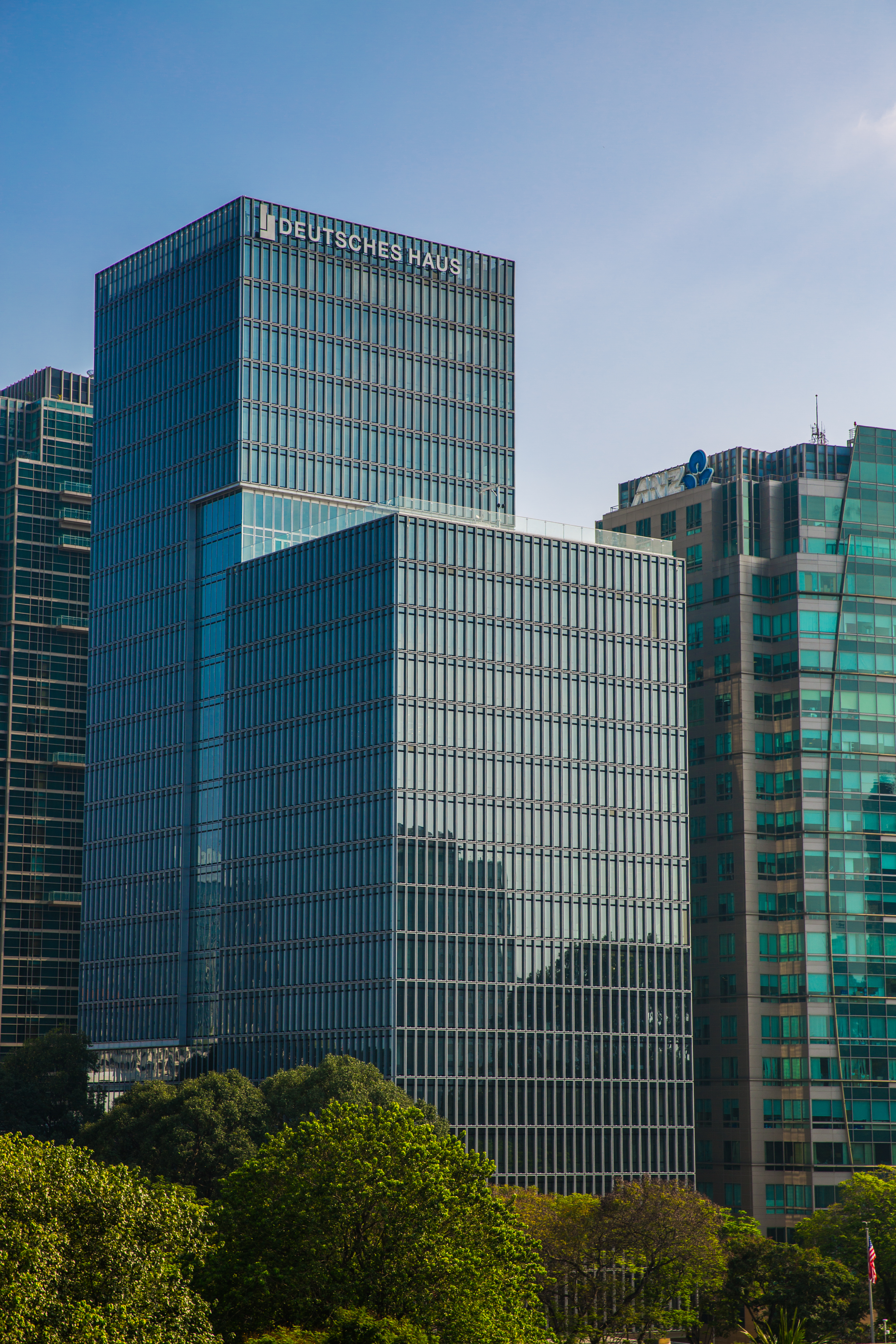
- Exterior view, December 2017

General information
- Status: Completed
- Type: Office, Consulate-general, Convention center, Restaurant, Cafes, Gym
- Location: Ho Chi Minh City, Vietnam, 33 Lê Duẩn Boulevard, Saigon ward
- Coordinates: 10.7816°N 106.7004°E
- Construction started: 2014
- Completed: 2017
- Cost: US$100 Million

Height
- Roof: 107 metres (351 ft)

Technical details
- Material: Reinforced concrete, Steel, Glass, Double-skin facade, LED facade
- Floor count: 25 (+4 below ground floors)
- Floor area: 40,000 m^{2}

Design and construction
- Architects: Gerkan, Marg and Partners (gmp), Germany

Website
- www.deutscheshausvietnam.com

The Deutsches Haus Ho Chi Minh City (English translation German House Ho Chi Minh City) is a building complex in Ho Chi Minh City, Vietnam, which was opened 2017. The 25-story building complex was initiated under a bilateral government agreement between Germany and Vietnam, with the purpose of setting standards for energy efficiency “made in Germany.” It is the location of the German Consulate General and other institutions and businesses, as well as a cultural and economic hub for German representation in Vietnam.

The building is regularly visited by German and Vietnamese state guests, politicians and business leaders and is a venue for international events.

== History ==
After the Deutsches Haus received its first political mention by the German Federal Foreign Minister Frank-Walter Steinmeier in 2008, the construction project was approved in 2013. Chancellor Angela Merkel regarded the building permit as an “important symbol” of further rapprochement between Germany and Vietnam. According to her statement, German institutions and interested German companies will have their common seat at the Deutsches Haus in Ho Chi Minh City.

In October 2015 was the official groundbreaking ceremony in the presence of international guests from the political, societal, and economic fields.

Also in 2015, the project was also distinguished as the Best Office Development and Best Green Development by the Vietnam Property Awards.

In 2016, the Deutsche Haus received the award for Best Green Building Development at the South East Asia Property Awards 2016.

In November 2016, the topping-out ceremony took place. The distinguished guests included Federal Foreign Minister Steinmeier.

In September 2017, the building was completed and opened as part of a soft opening. The Vietnamese Party secretary for Ho-Chi-Minh City, Nguyễn Thiện Nhân, and others attended the ceremony.

The German-born CEO of the owner company, Horst Geicke, sees the Deutsches Haus as the main address for German, Central European and global companies and investors in Vietnam and ASEAN.

Since September 2018, there are three Buddy Bears in the lobby of the Deutsches Haus, symbolizing the bond between Germany and Vietnam, whose motifs show different aspects of the German-Vietnamese relationship.

In January 2024, German Federal President Steinmeier (as he did before as Federal Foreign Minister) visited the Deutsches Haus with a delegation and meetings were held with Vietnamese politicians and the German-Vietnamese business community.

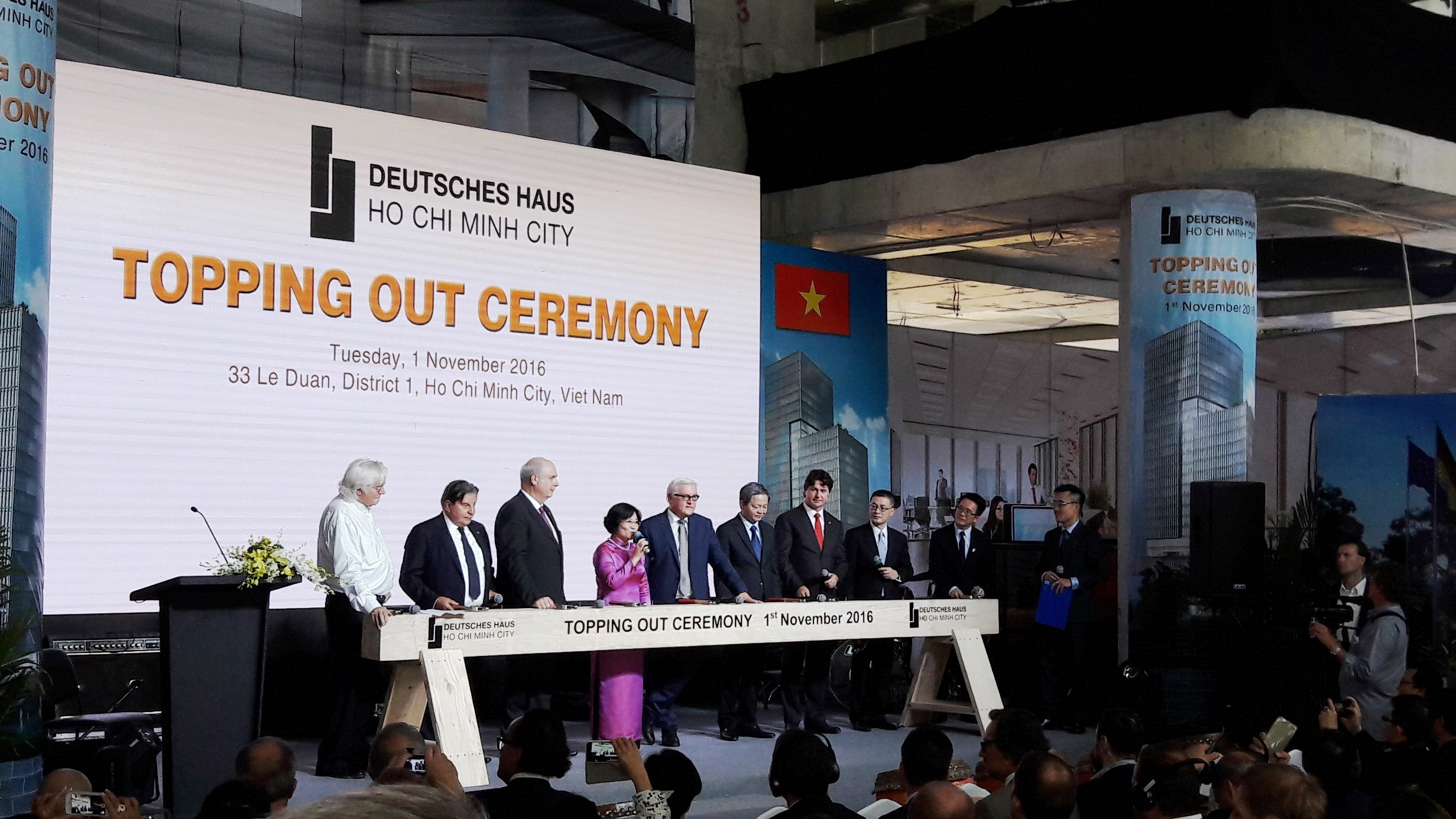
Topping out event with investors and politicians

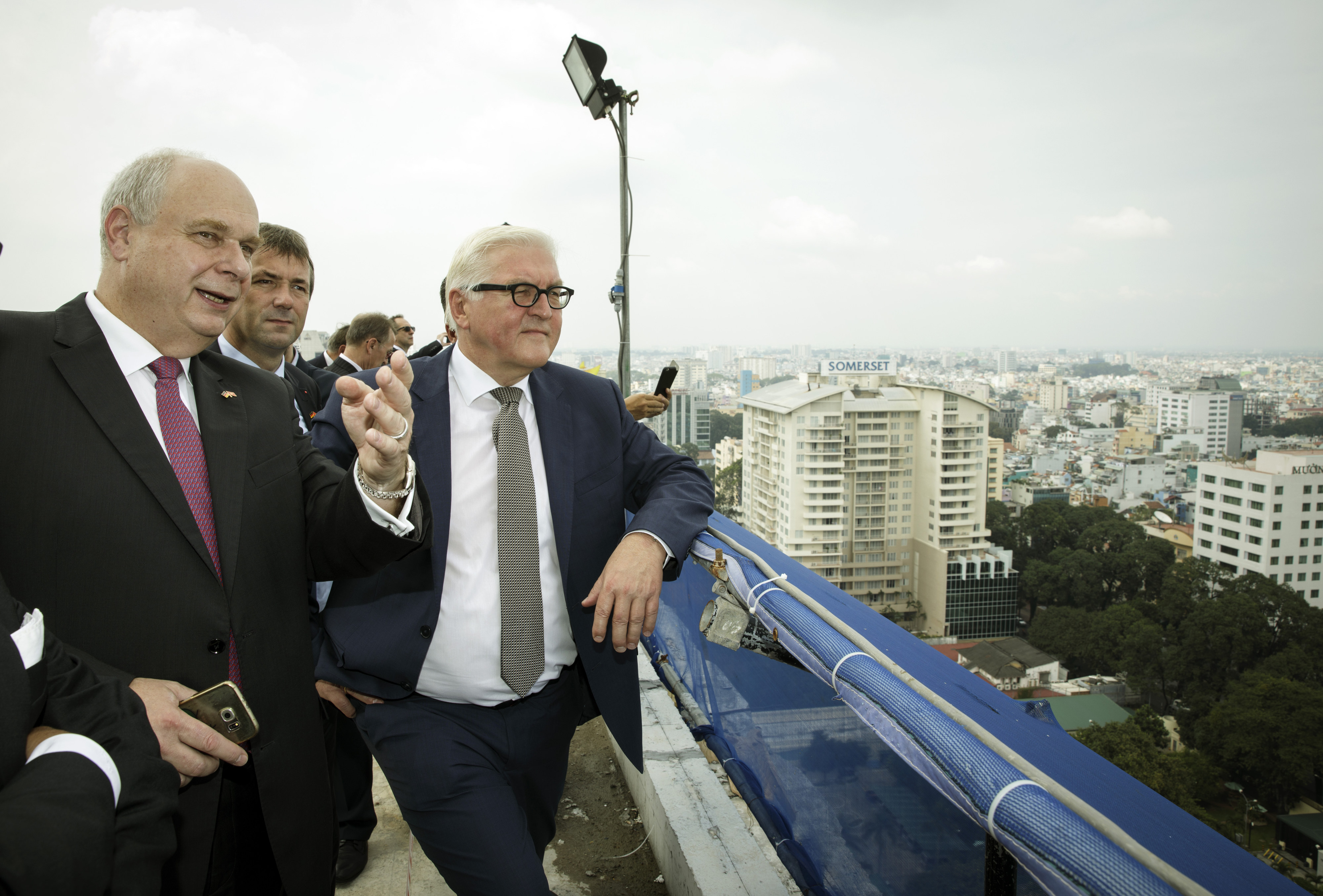
Topping out

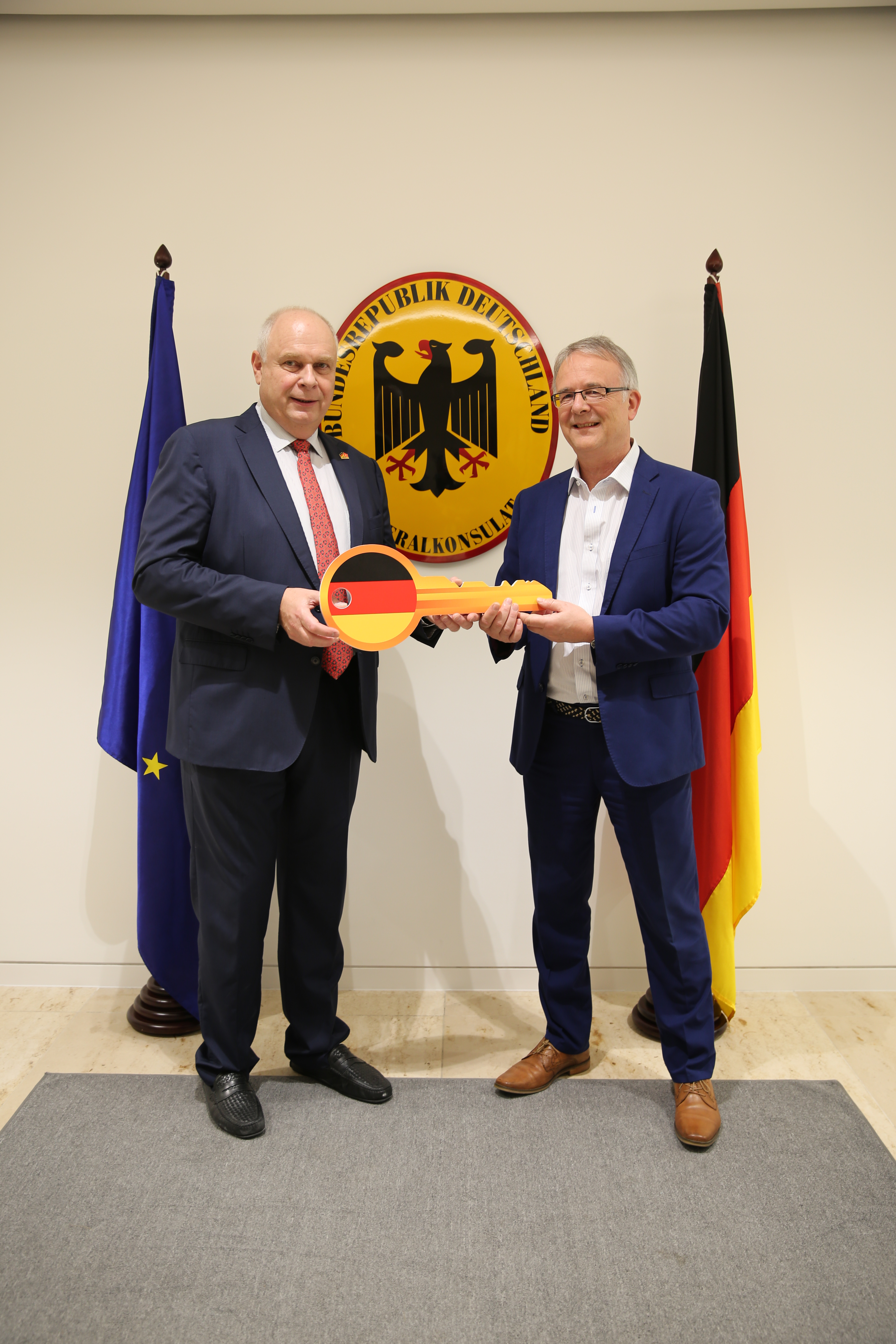
Symbolic key handover to the Consul General

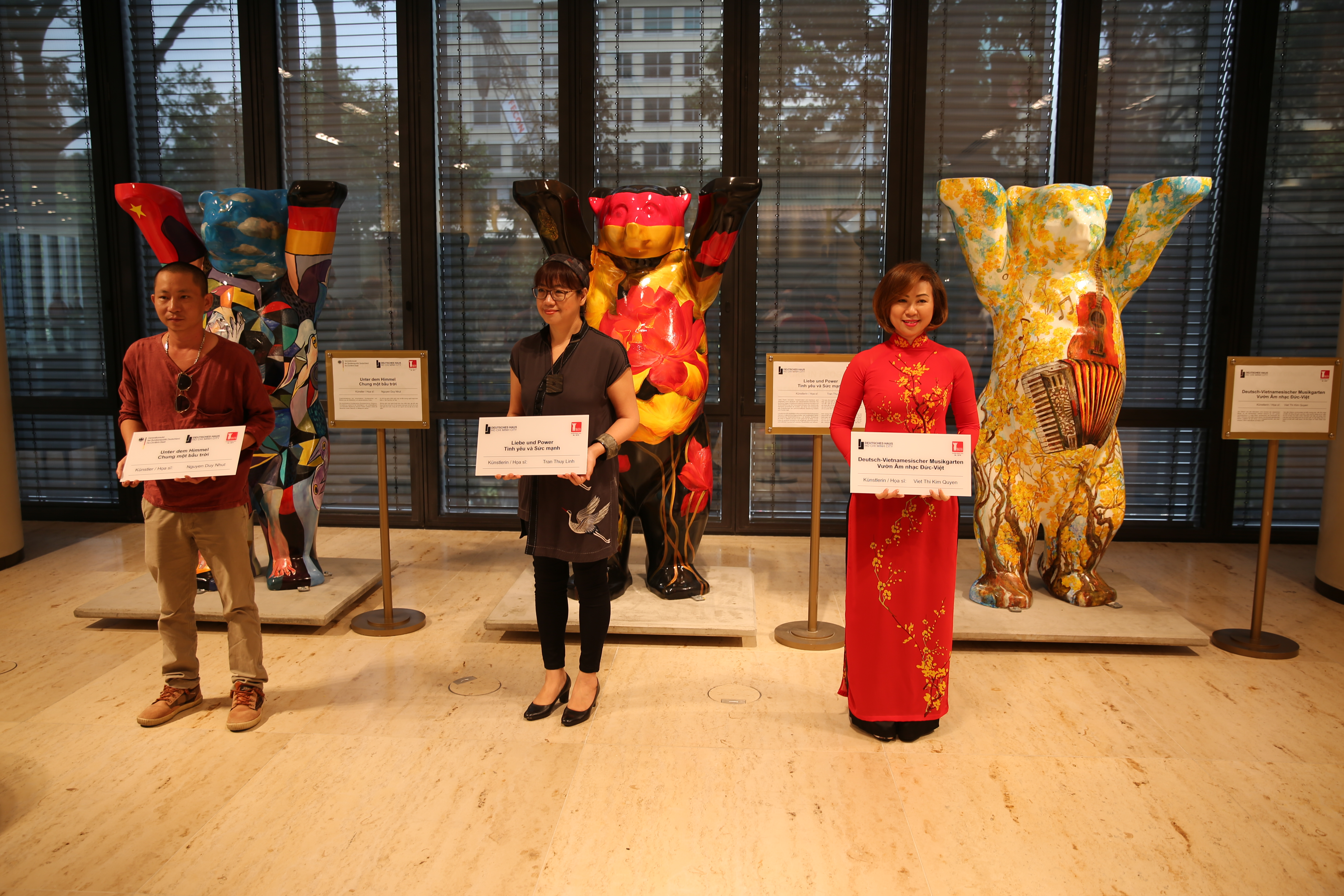
Buddy Bears

== Design and Ecology ==
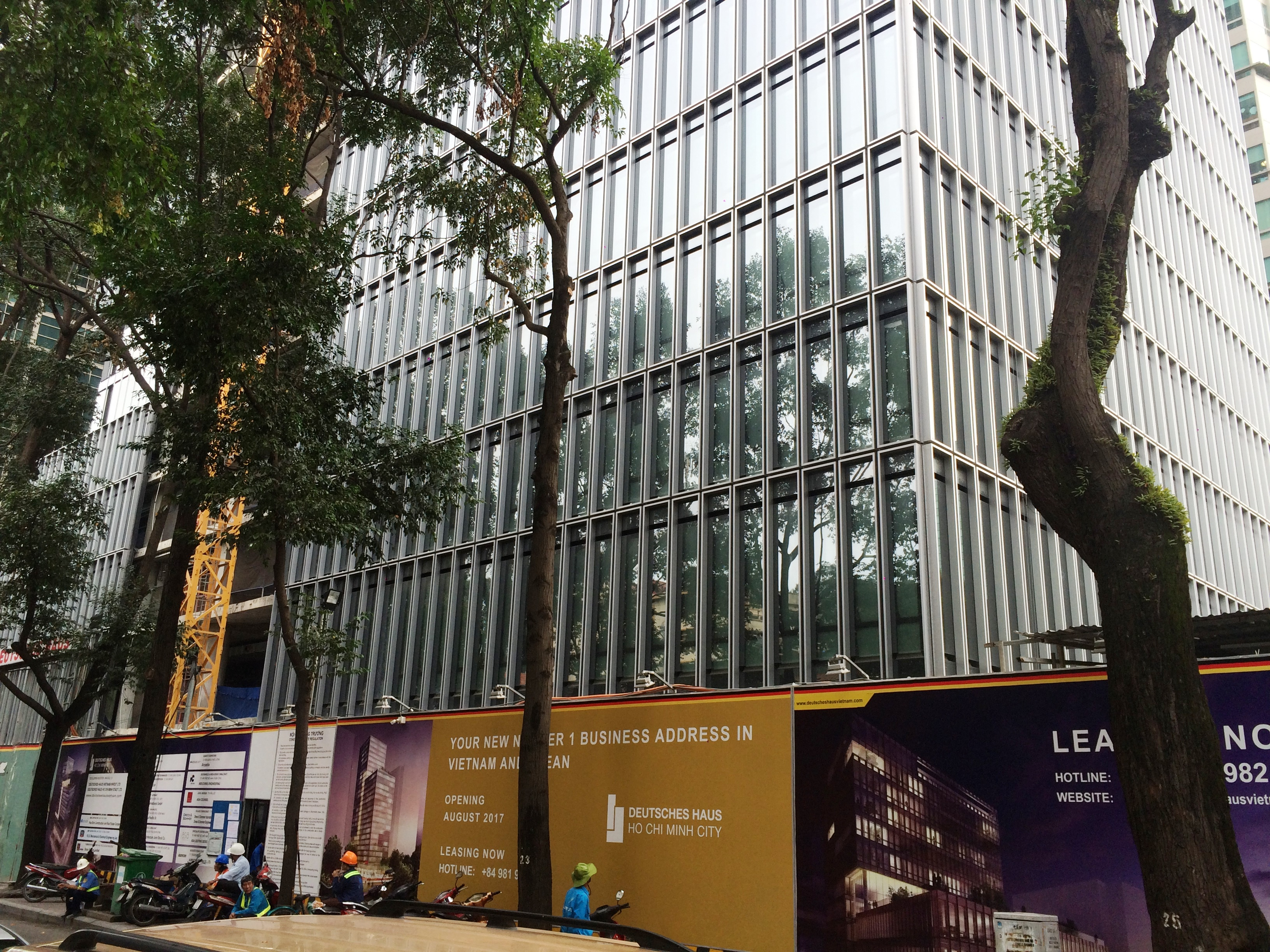
Construction

The architectural concept expresses Germany's leading role as an industrial and technological nation through transparency and structured nature, economic construction, and energy efficiency. According to the Federal Ministry of Economics, the building will set new standards for energy efficiency and environmental building standards in Vietnam by the use of ecological building materials in combination with the latest technology from Germany.

A double facade is adapted to the climatic conditions of the country and will contribute significantly to energy savings.

A glass facade signals openness to the urban environment. The two buildings which are different in height are interconnected by “glass joints.” An arcade will open the high-rise buildings on the ground floor area to both street fronts and connect the entries with the different lobbies and areas.

== Gallery ==
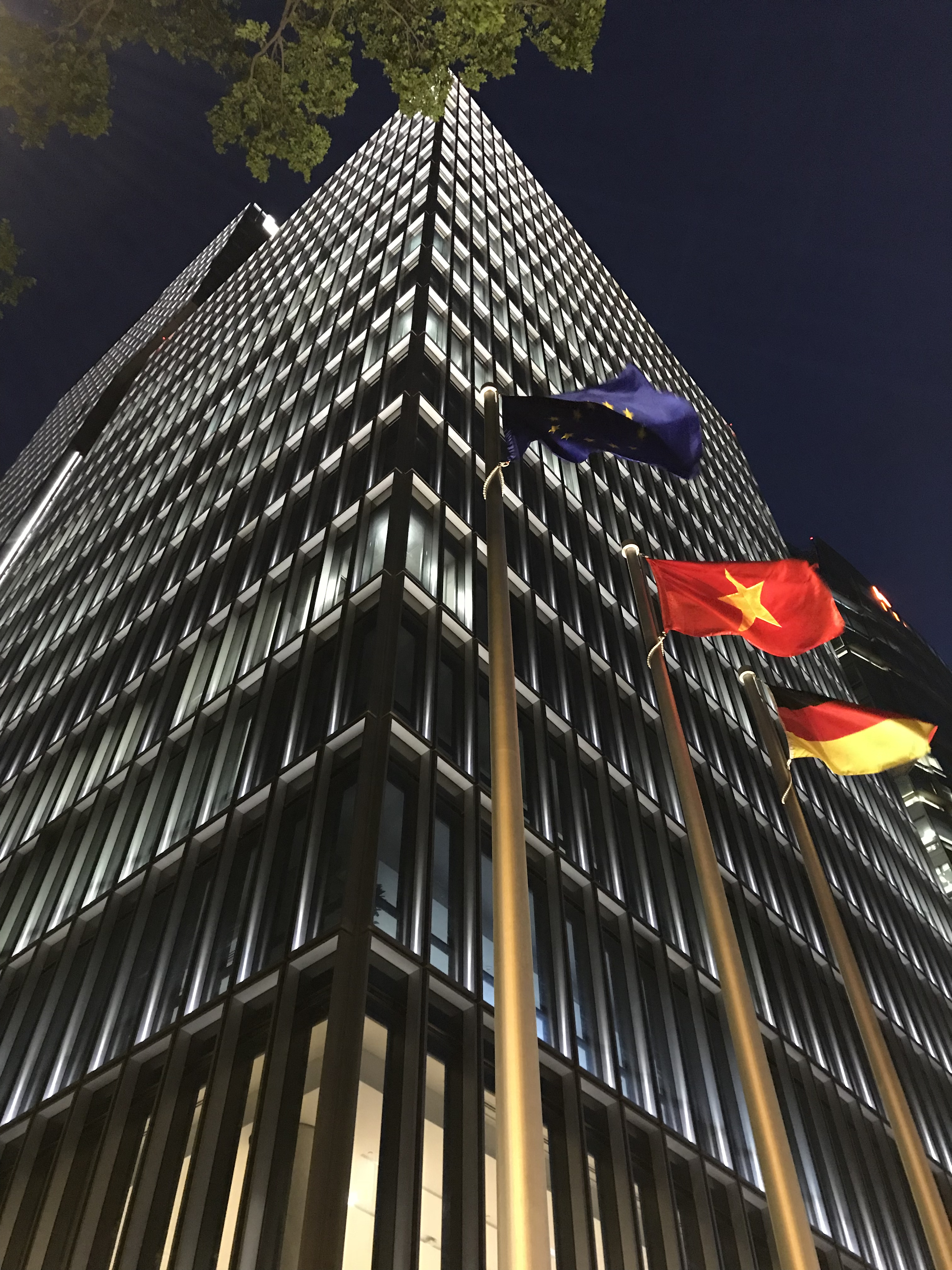
Deutsches Haus by night

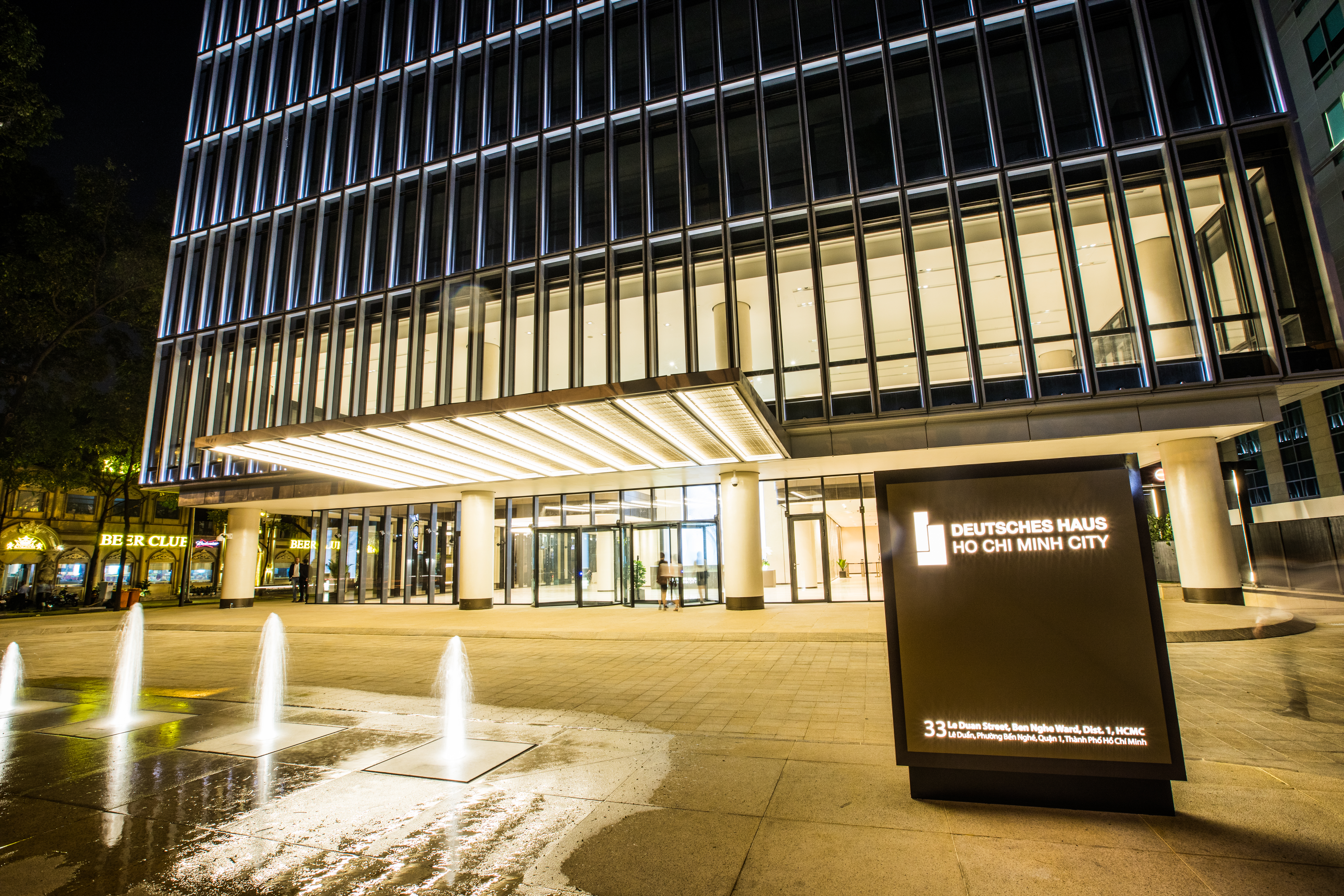
Main entrance

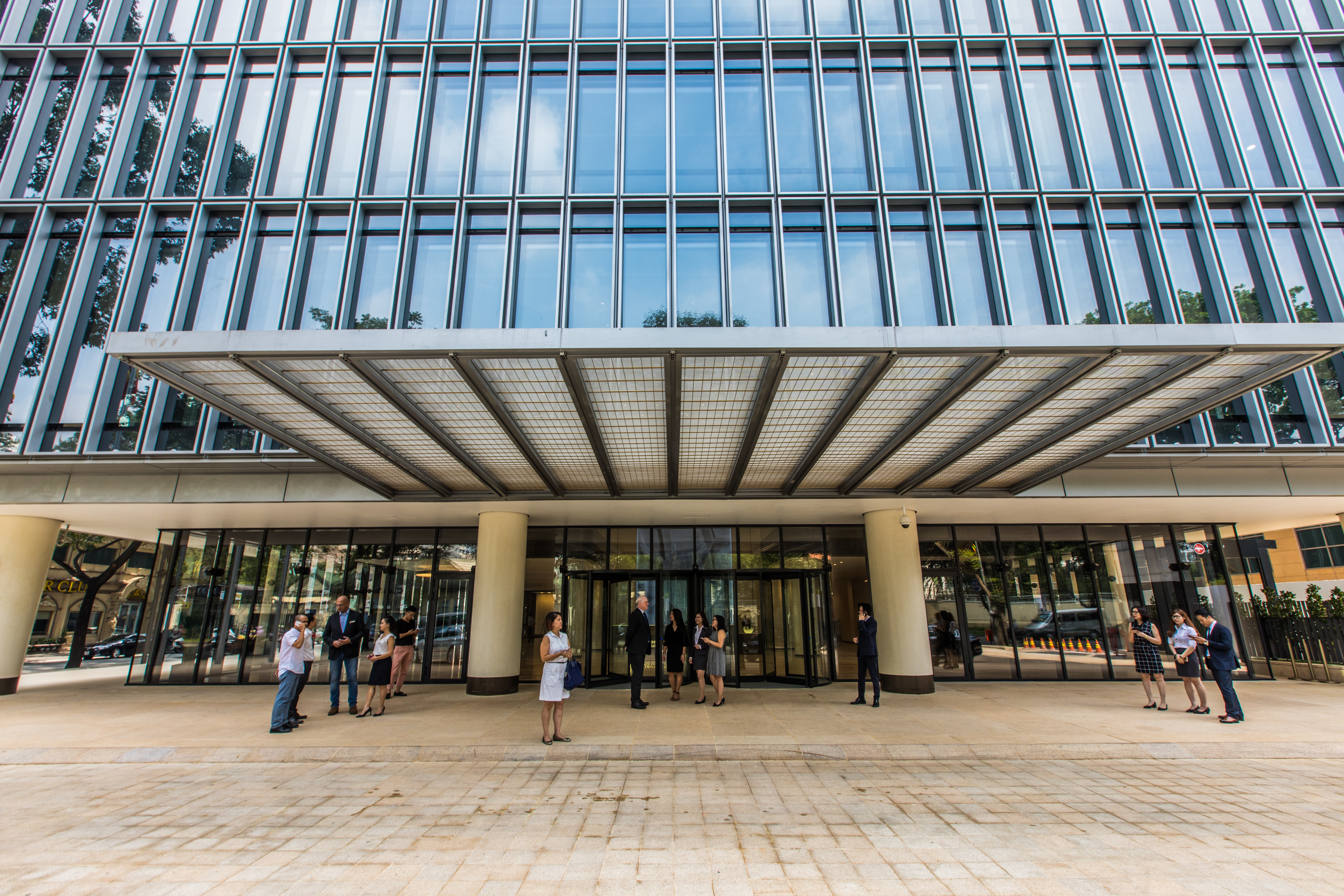
Main entrance

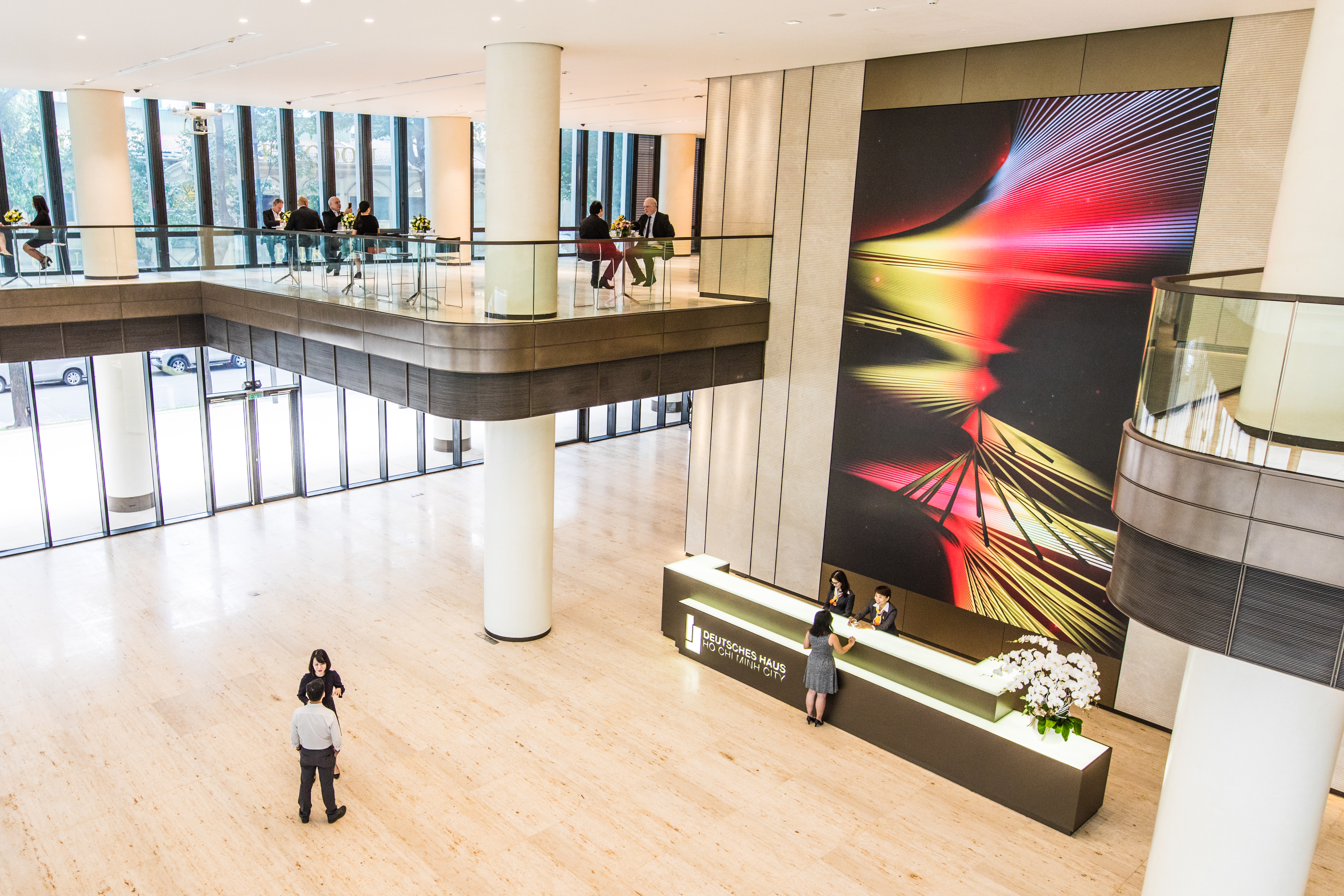
Lobby

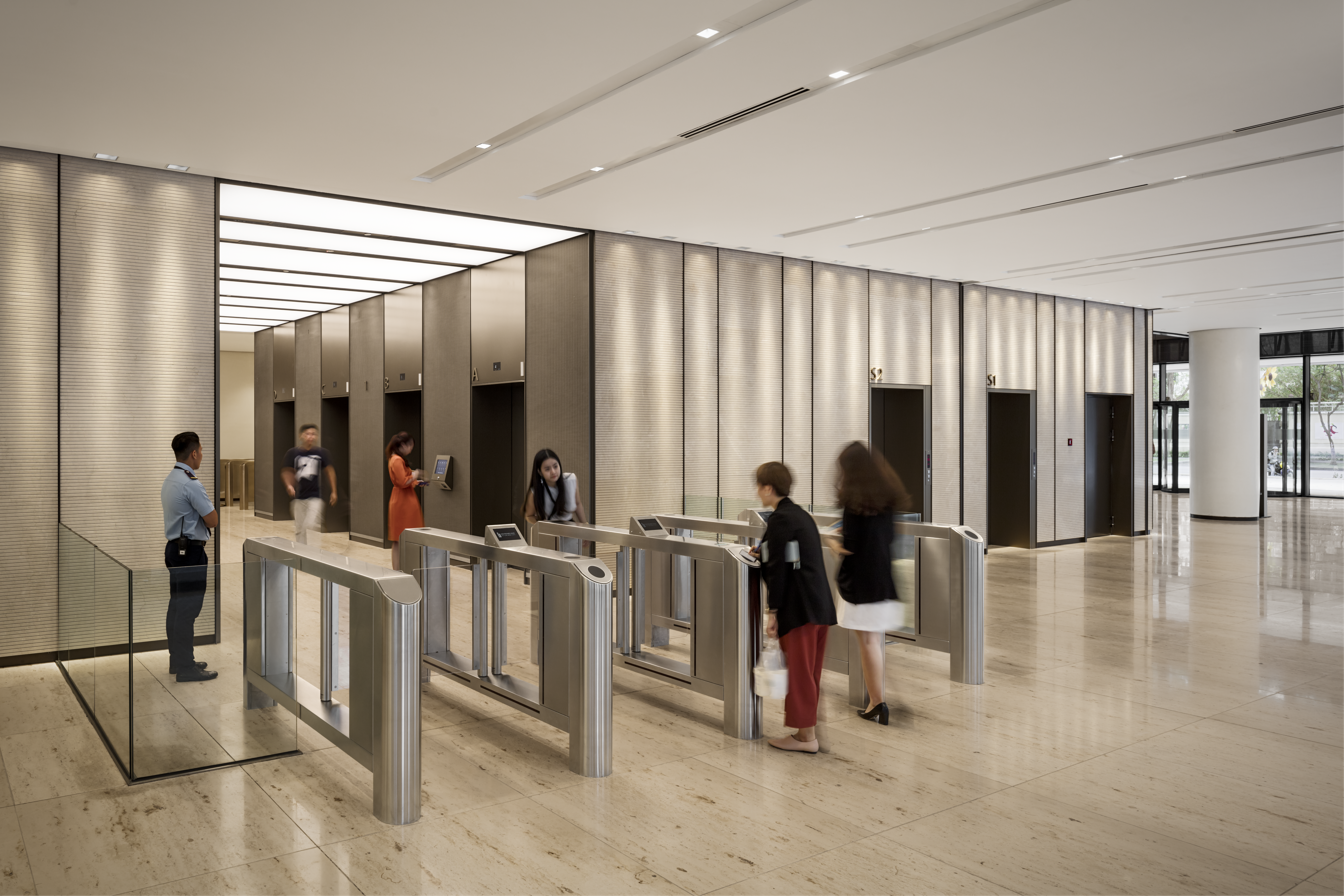
Lobby

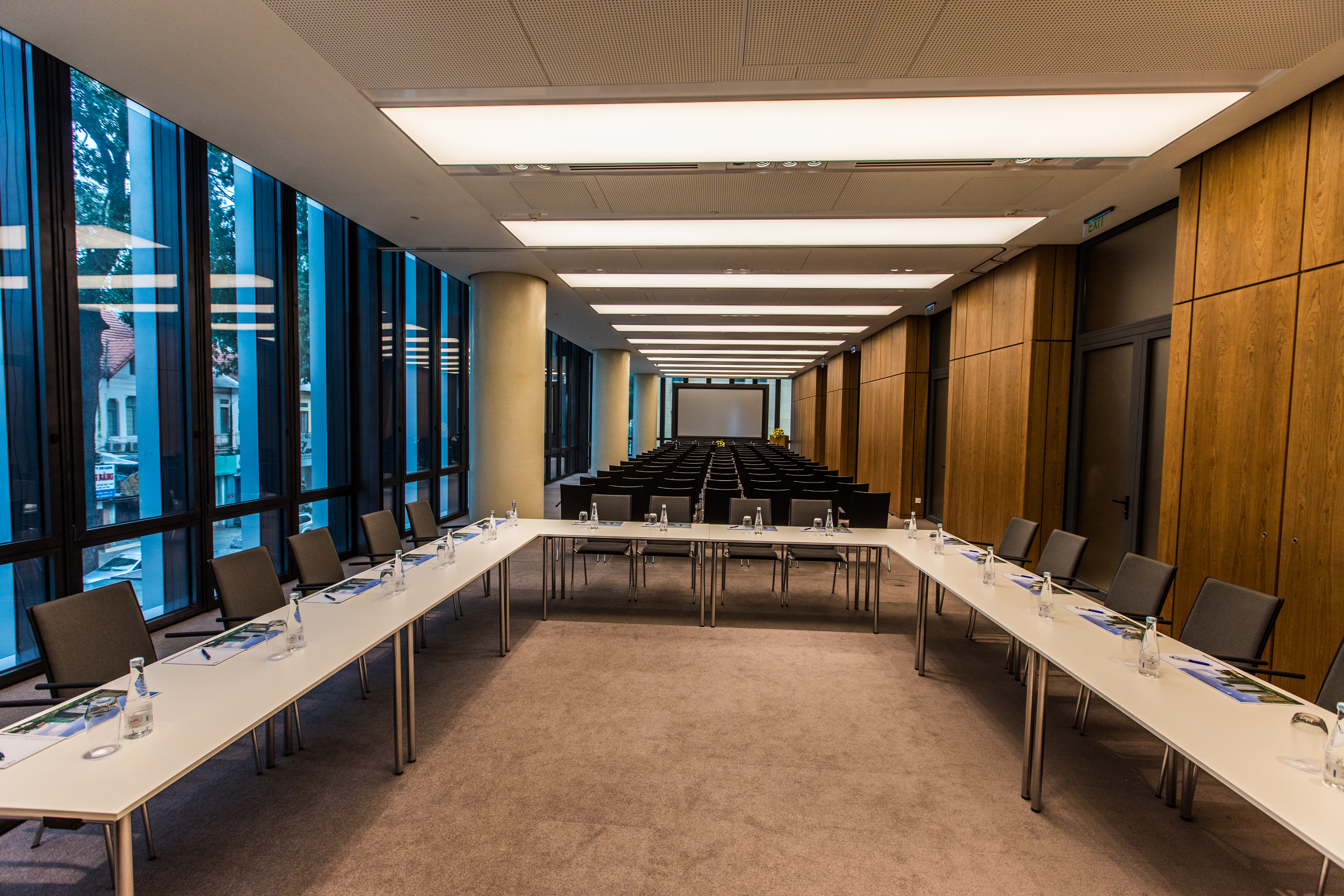
Conference room

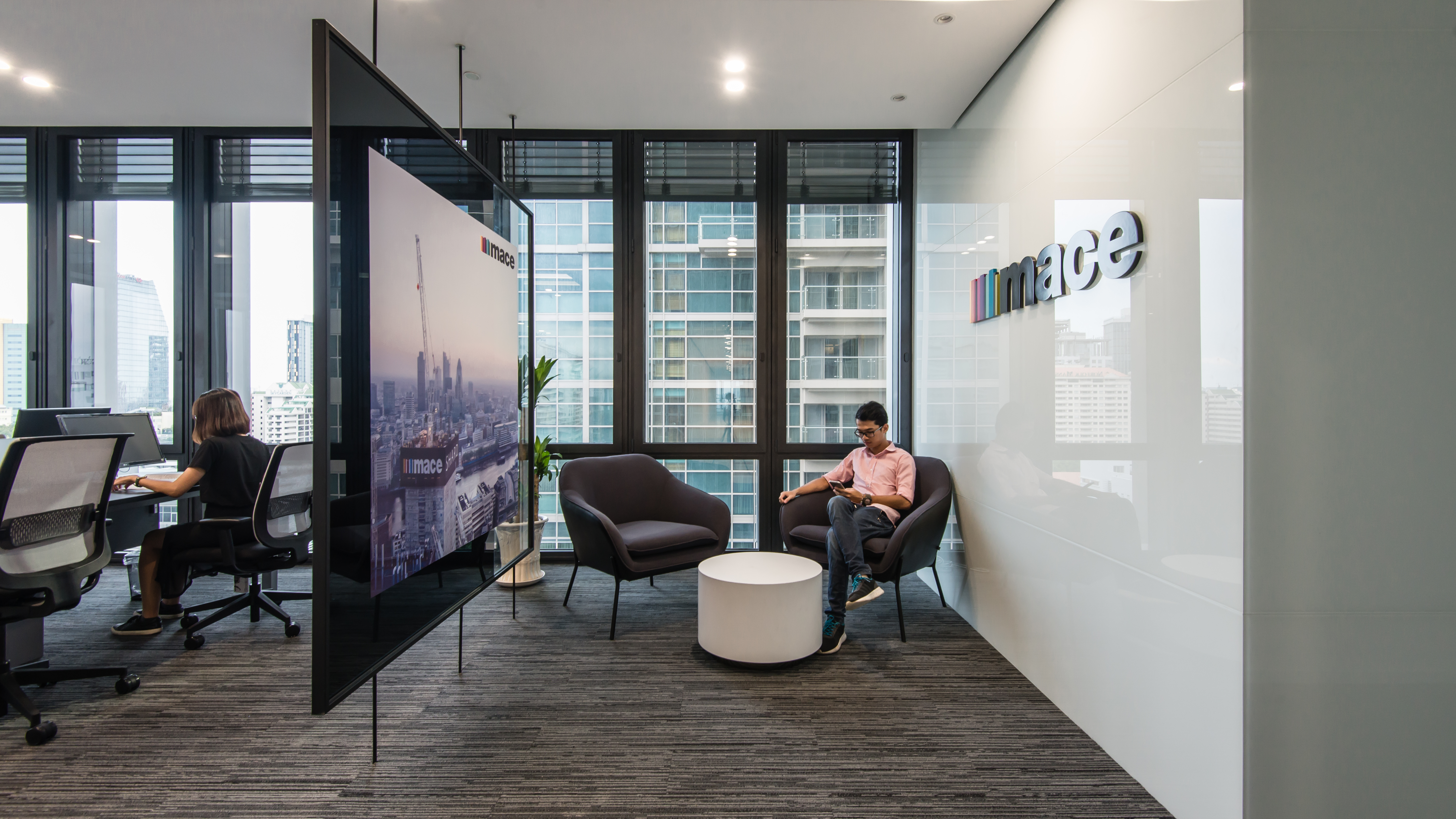
View of an office

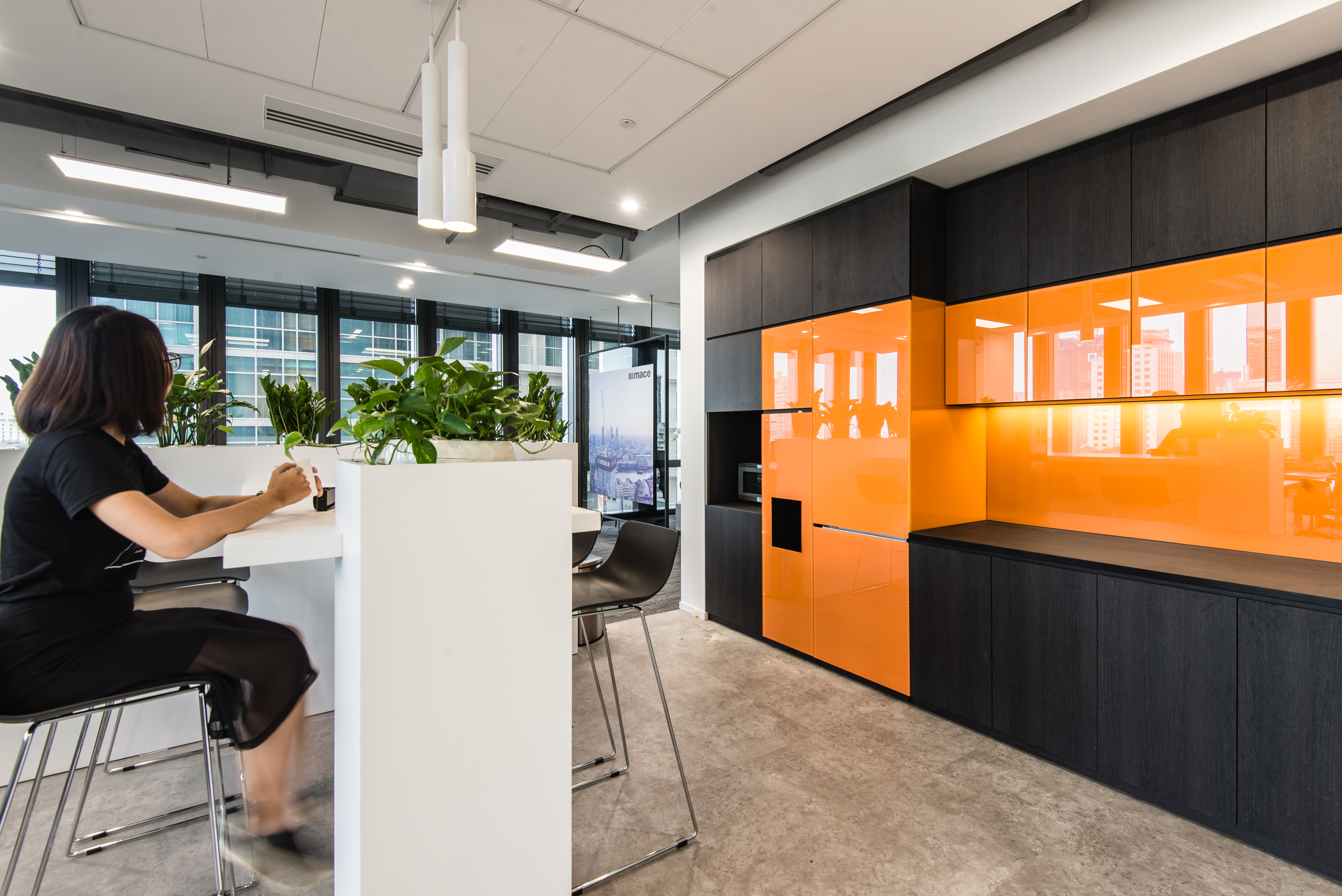
View of a lounge

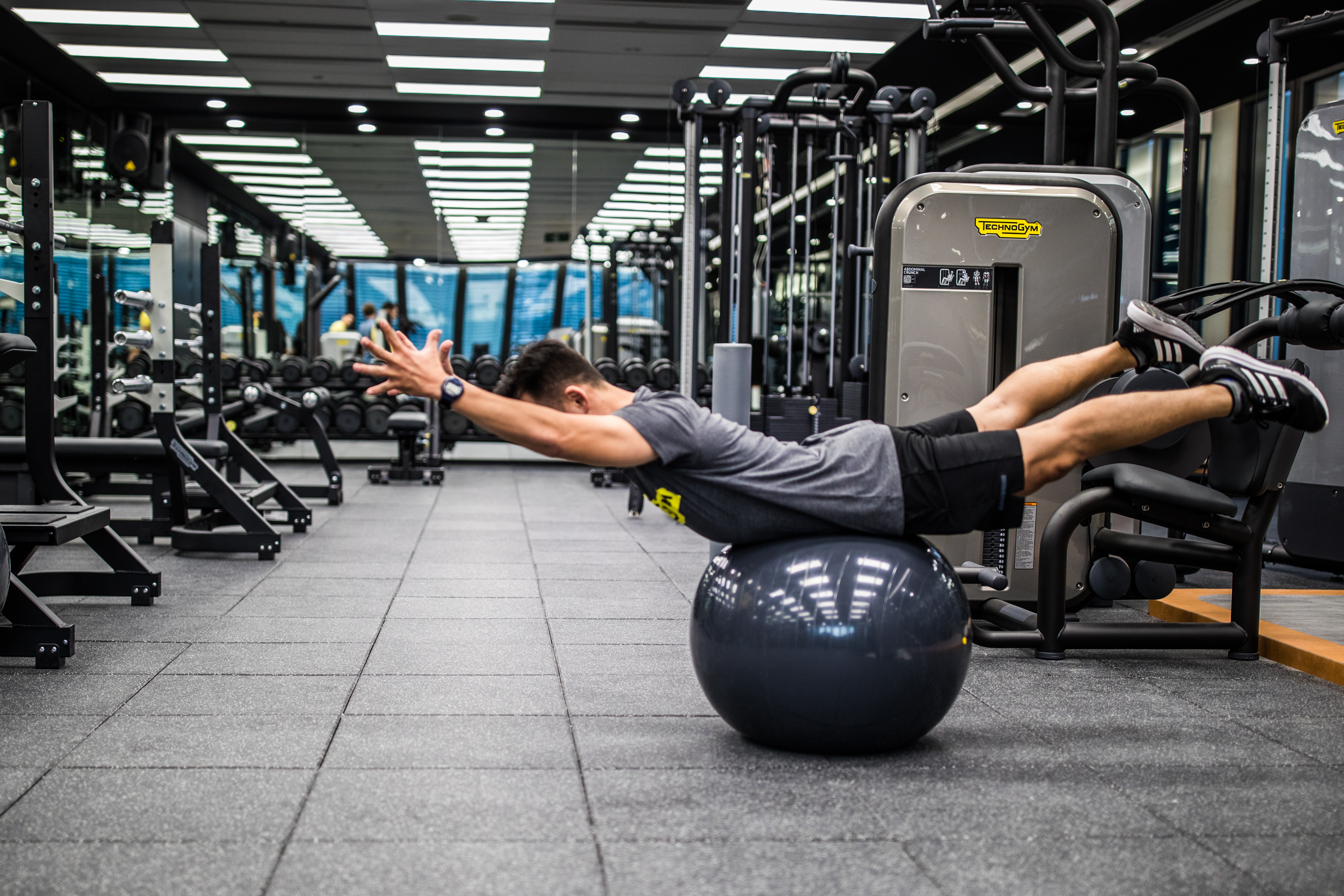
Fitness room

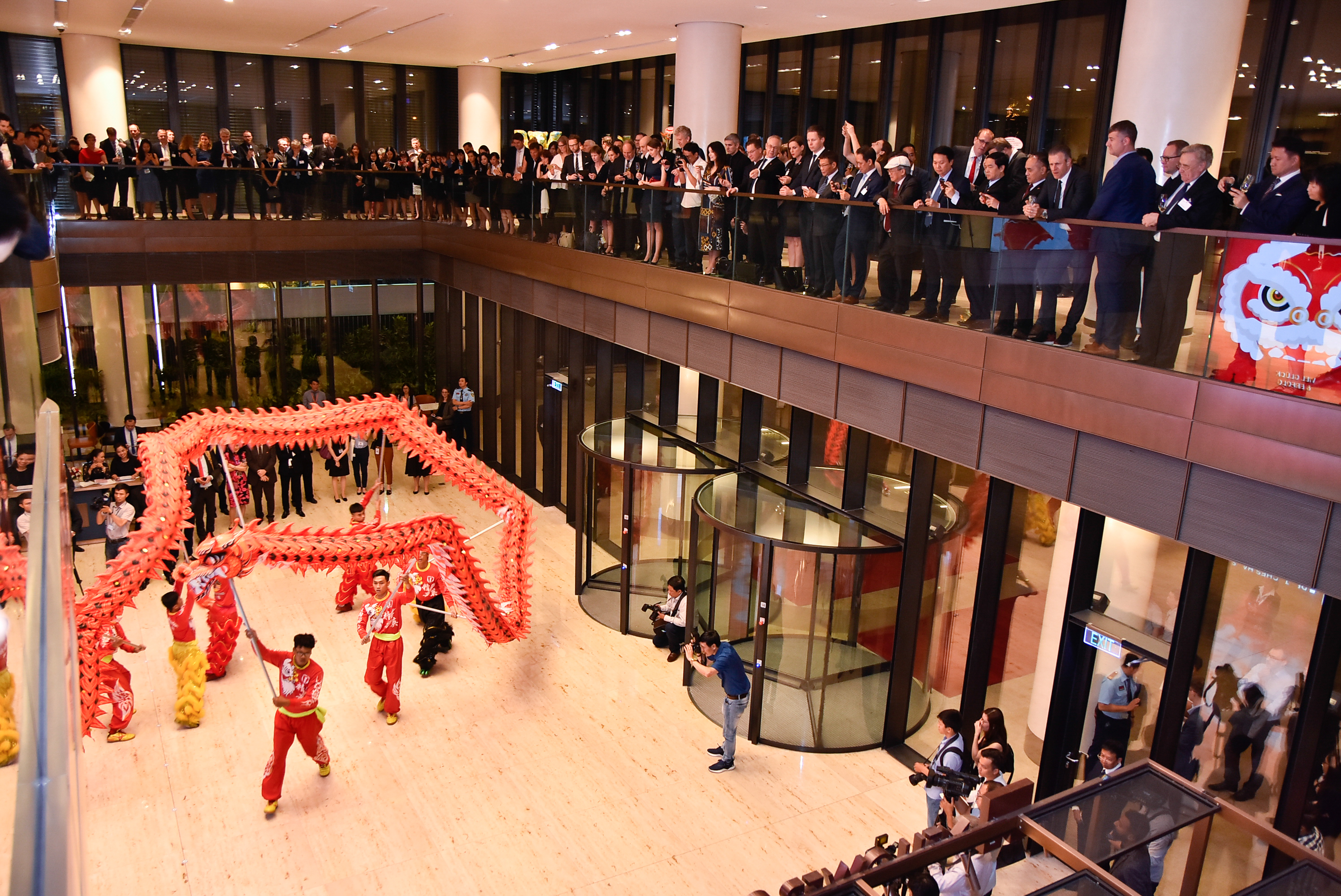
Inauguration of Deutsches Haus Ho Chi Minh City

== Further ==
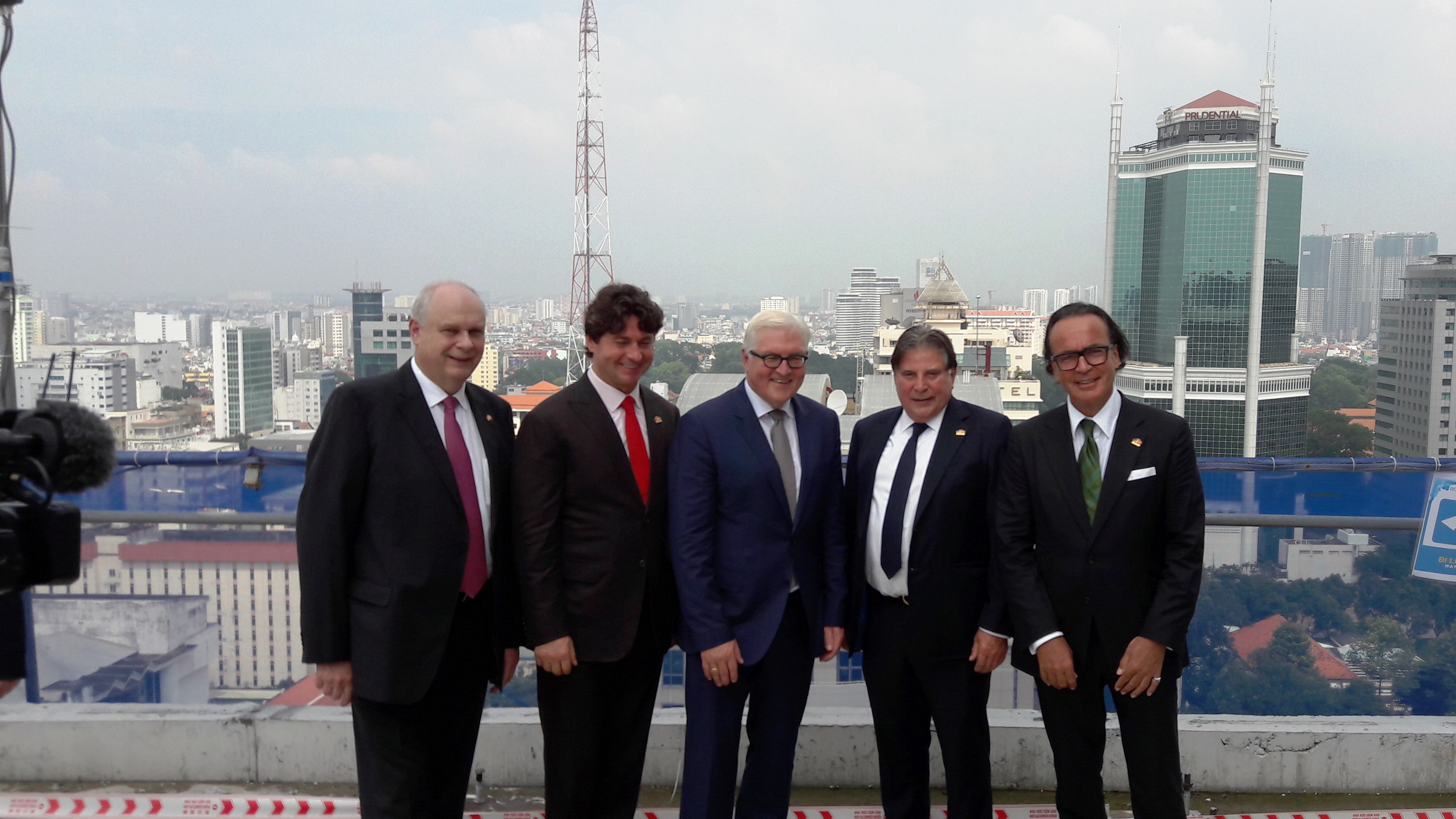
Frank-Walter Steinmeier (middle) with the directors of the board

The building complex is also called Deutsches Haus HCMC or Deutsches Haus in Vietnam.

The owner is Deutsches Haus Vietnam Invest Ltd., a consortium of investors.

The British, French and US consulates-general are located next to Deutsches Haus.

The Federal Republic of Germany originally bought the property in 1960. After a dispossession in 1975, Germany regained the usage right to the property in 2011.
