= Financial District, Saigon =

Coordinates: 10°46′13.08″N 106°42′14.61″E

Financial District Khu tài chính Sài Gòn Nguyễn Thái Bình ward
- Ward (formerly), Quarter
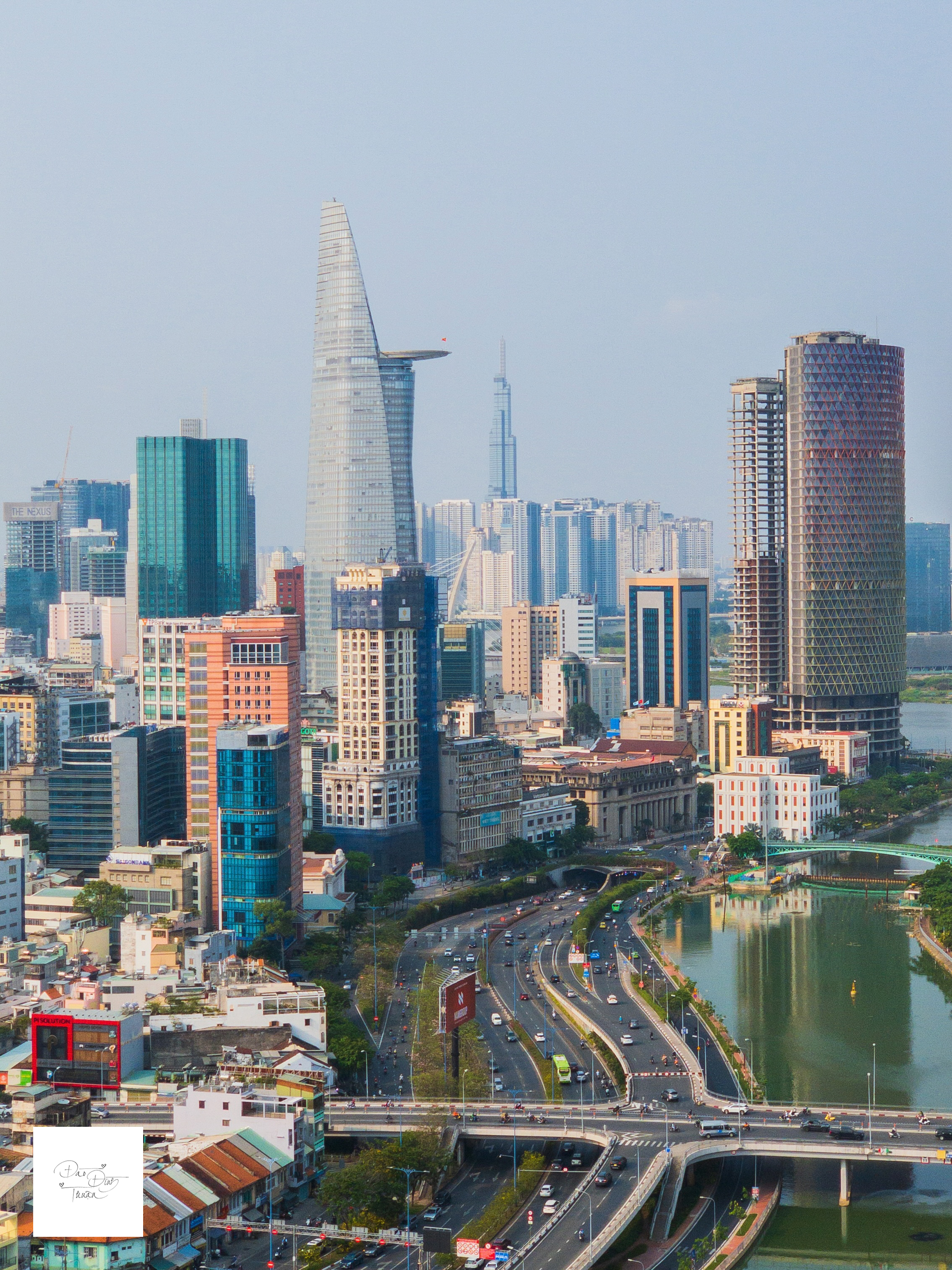
- A corner of Financial District seen from above with Võ Văn Kiệt Blvd, Thủ Thiêm Tunnel and Bến Nghé Canal included
- Interactive map of Financial District
- Country: Vietnam
- Municipality: Ho Chi Minh City
- District: District 1
- Time zone: UTC+07:00 (Indochina Time)
- Postal code: 71010

The Financial District is a part of Downtown Saigon, Ho Chi Minh City, Vietnam, it serves as the city historic financial district since the French Indochina with traditional trading and banking activities here, then securities trading activities appeared as of the Ho Chi Minh City Stock Exchange was opened in 2000.

During 1988 to 2025, the area was administratively known as Nguyễn Thái Bình ward (phường) of District 1, Ho Chi Minh City, Vietnam. It is home to the Region 2 Branch of State Bank of Vietnam.

== History ==
=== Administration ===
Before 1975, the area of the district now was belong to wards of Bến Nghé, 1st District (Quận Nhứt) and Cầu Ông Lãnh, 2nd District (Quận Nhì) of the City of Saigon, with the boundary was the Công Lý Street (now is Nam Kỳ Khởi Nghĩa Street).

After 1976, both the districts were annexed into District 1 of Ho Chi Minh City, Bến Nghé Ward was dissolved into wards of 8, 9, 10 (Hòa Bình ward of the 1st District was merged into Bến Nghé a year ago); and Cầu Ông Lãnh ward was dissolved into wards of 18, 19, 20, 21.

In 1982, ward 9 was annexed into ward 18 and ward 19. Six years later, in 1988, all wards were dissolved with most of them were established into the wards that have almost the same with administrative boundaries of the former wards in before 1975. And Nguyễn Thái Bình Ward was established from the annexation of wards of 18 and 19. The ward was named after an anti-war student, Nguyễn Thái Bình.

In July 2025, Nguyễn Thái Bình ward was dissolved and being part of Bến Thành and Saigon ward (divided by Nam Kỳ Khởi Nghĩa Street).

== Overall ==
=== Location ===
The core area of the financial district is often defined as a 7-urban block quadrangle area being enclosed by Bến Chương Dương Street (now Võ Văn Kiệt Boulevard, part of East–West Highway), Hàm Nghi Boulevard, and Nam Kỳ Khởi Nghĩa Street in Saigon ward, the notable buildings here are the State Bank of Vietnam, Region 2 Branch and the IFC One Saigon (it was built on the site which was the original Port Authority before relocated to the Dragon House).

The adjacent affected areas are Bến Thành ward (former part of Nguyễn Thái Bình ward), where the city's stock exchange is technically located. The area in the north of Hàm Nghi Boulevard, also known as 'Old Market' (Chợ cũ) quarter, which was the former site of Bến Thành Market before relocated into the current site and known as 'New Market' (Chợ Mới), is also an adjacent affected area, where the Banque Franco-Chinoise was here at the 32 Hàm Nghi building, it was later Mekong Housing Bank until it was merged into Bank for Investment and Development of Vietnam, the Ho Chi Minh City State Treasury is built on the site of former Bến Thành Market hall, some other notable buildings are: Bitexco Financial Tower, Sunwah Tower (built on the former site of Justice de Paix), Vietnam International Financial Centre Headquarters and the Ho Chi Minh City Customs Department.

=== Notable places ===
As the financial district is where the city most active in trading and banking activities with numerous bank transaction offices, also where the State Bank of Vietnam, Region 2 Branch and Ho Chi Minh City Stock Exchange (HoSE) located, it is nicknamed as the "Wall Street of Saigon". Furthermore, this nickname can specifically refers to Nguyễn Công Trứ Street, a central thoroughfare running through the core area with some notable landmarks on it such as ROX Tower, Exchange Tower, Ho Chi Minh City Branch of State Bank of Vietnam, Ho Chi Minh City University of Banking.

== Gallery ==
State Bank of Vietnam, Region 2 Branch Building, formerly Banque de l'Indochine

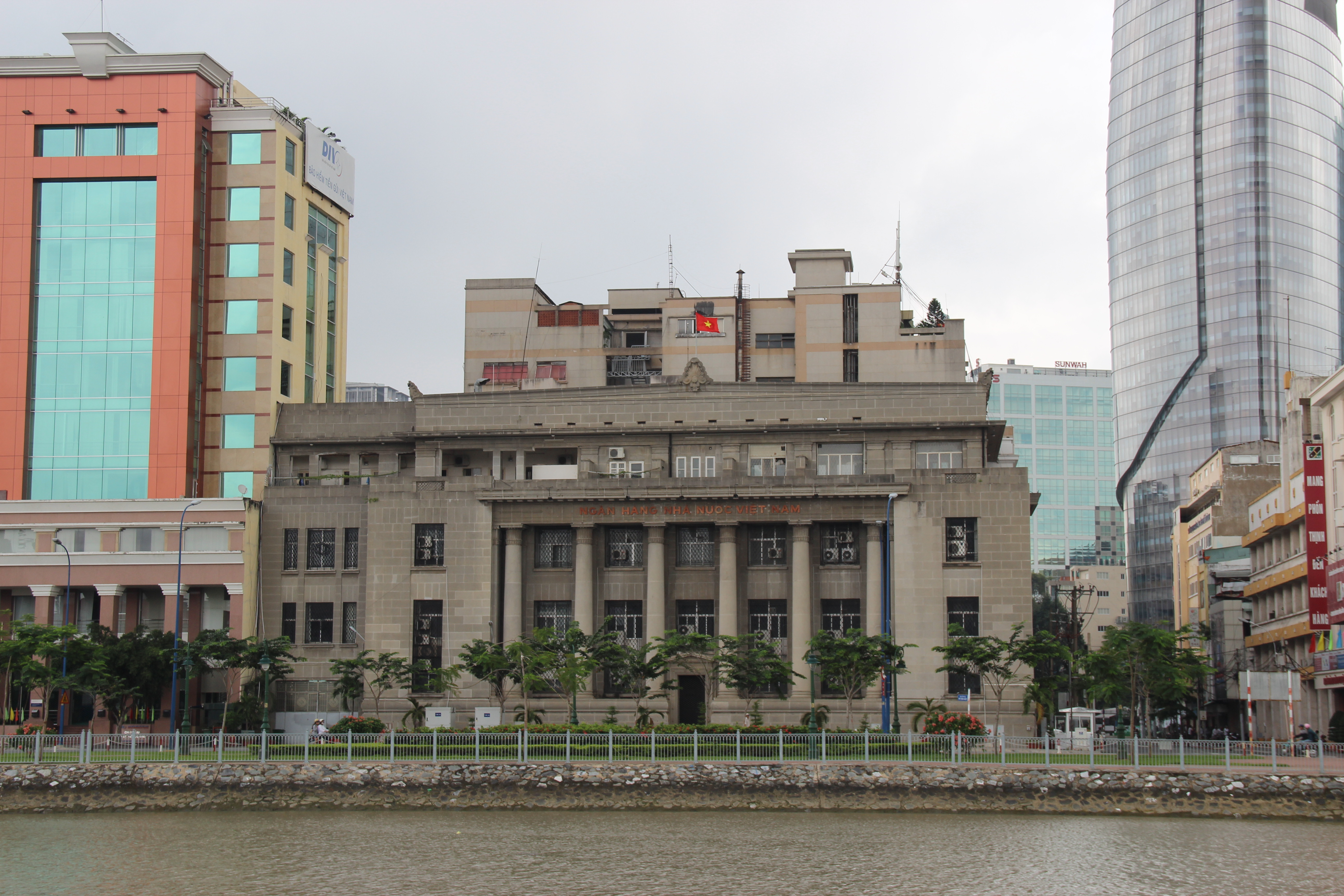
Former HSBC headquarters building on Chương Dương Quay, Saigon. Now is used by State Bank of Vietnam, Region 2 Branch on Võ Văn Kiệt Boulevard

Exchange Tower – Ho Chi Minh City Stock Exchange Headquarters

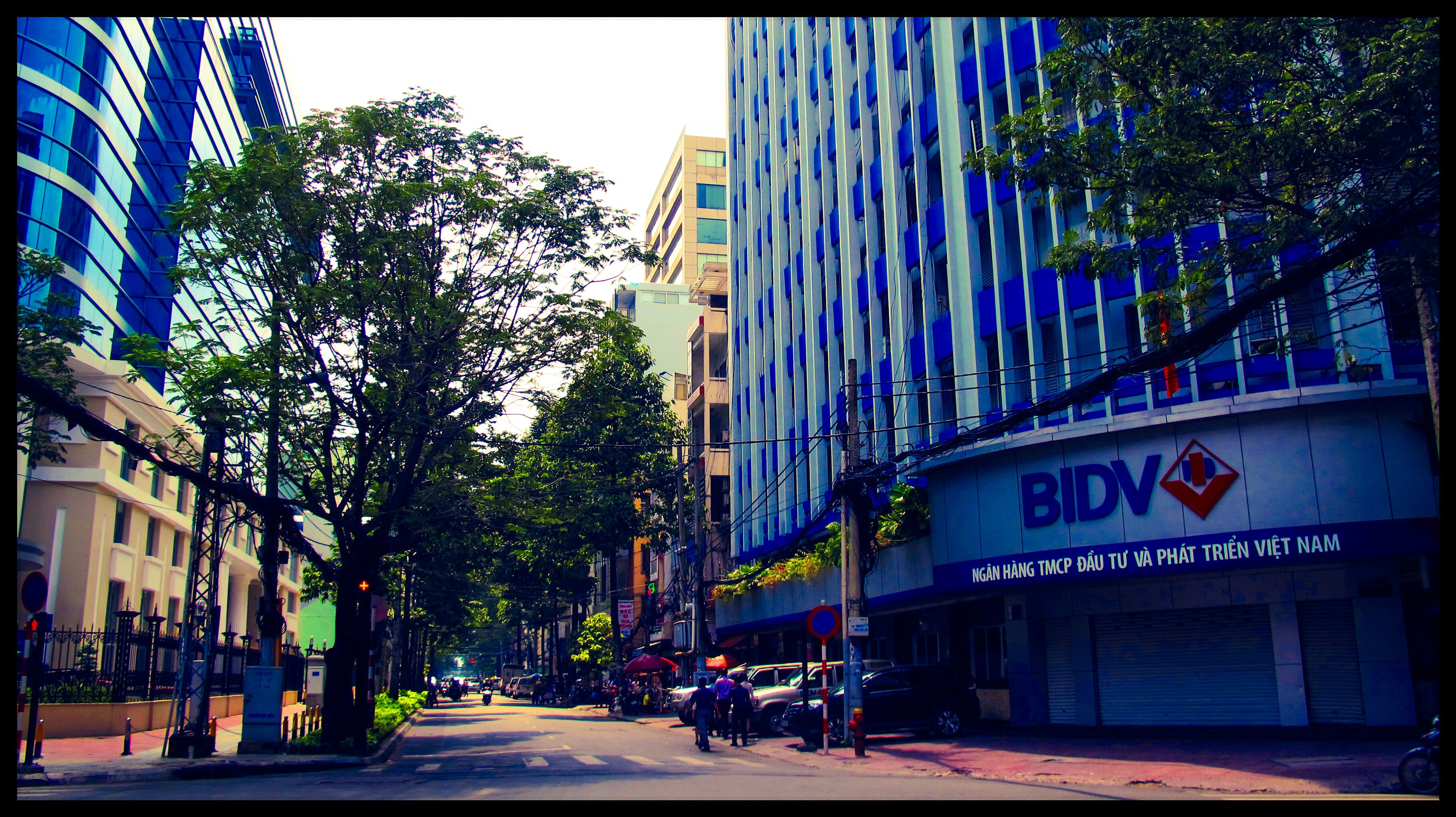
Nguyễn Công Trứ Street, the major street of the district. Nicknamed as "Wall Street of Saigon"

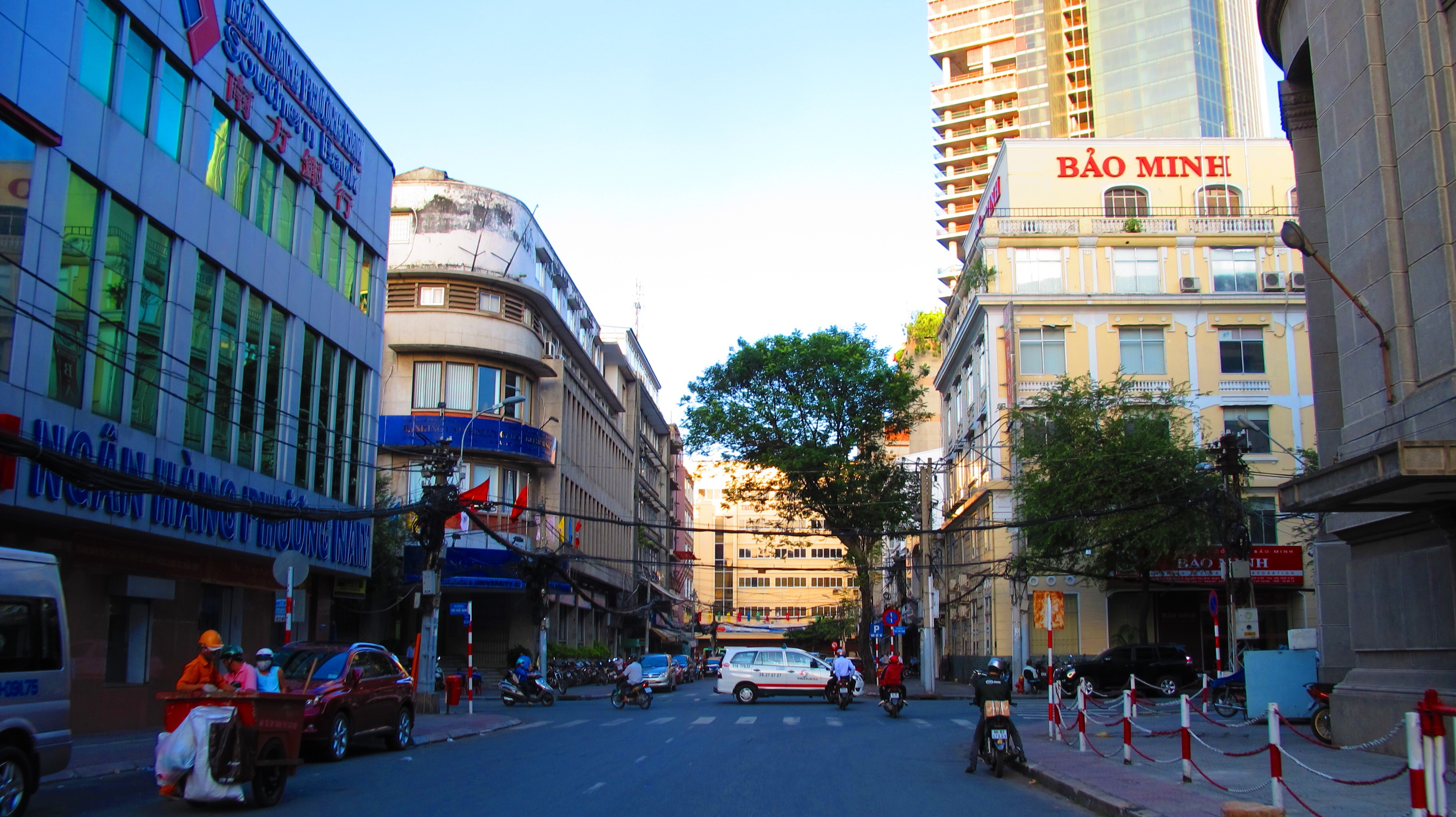
Ho Chi Minh City University of Banking and State Bank of Vietnam, Ho Chi Minh City Branch with some commercial banks office at the Nguyễn Công Trứ and Pasteur intersection.

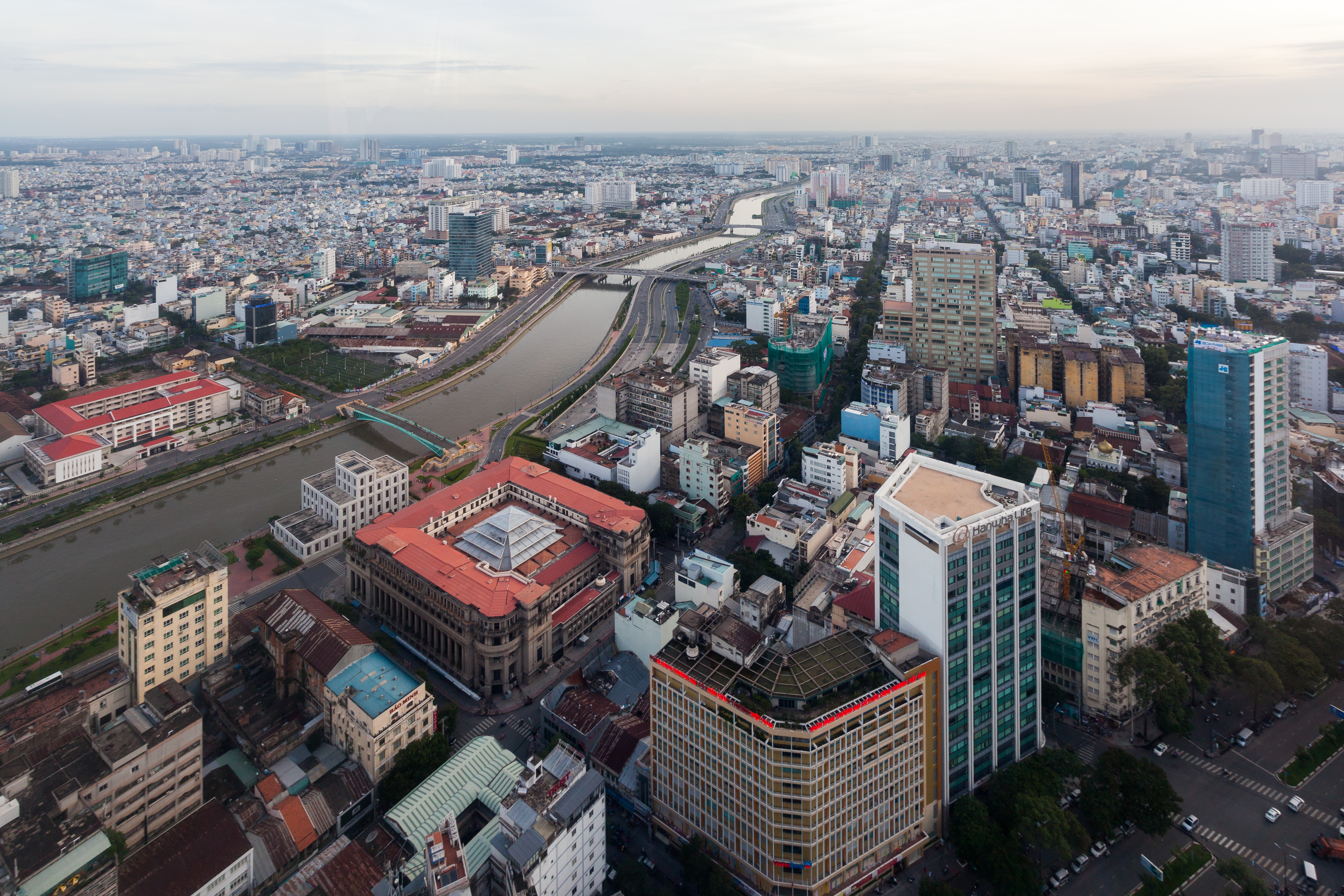
Panorama view of the Financial District from Bitexco Financial Tower observatory

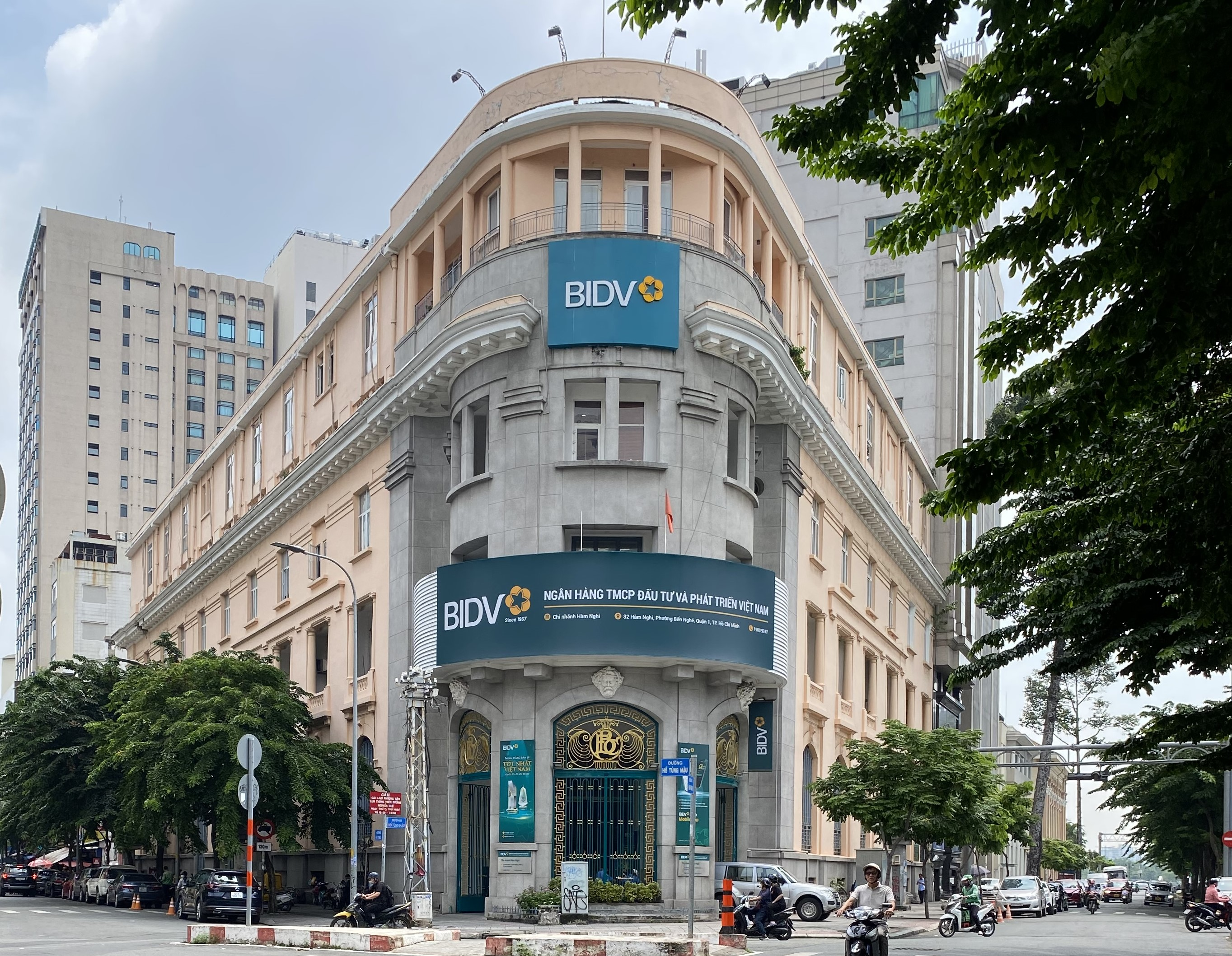
32 Hàm Nghi Building, former place of Banque Franco-Chinoise, now used by BIDV as the Ho Chi Minh City representative office

BIDV Ho Chi Minh City Branch headquarters

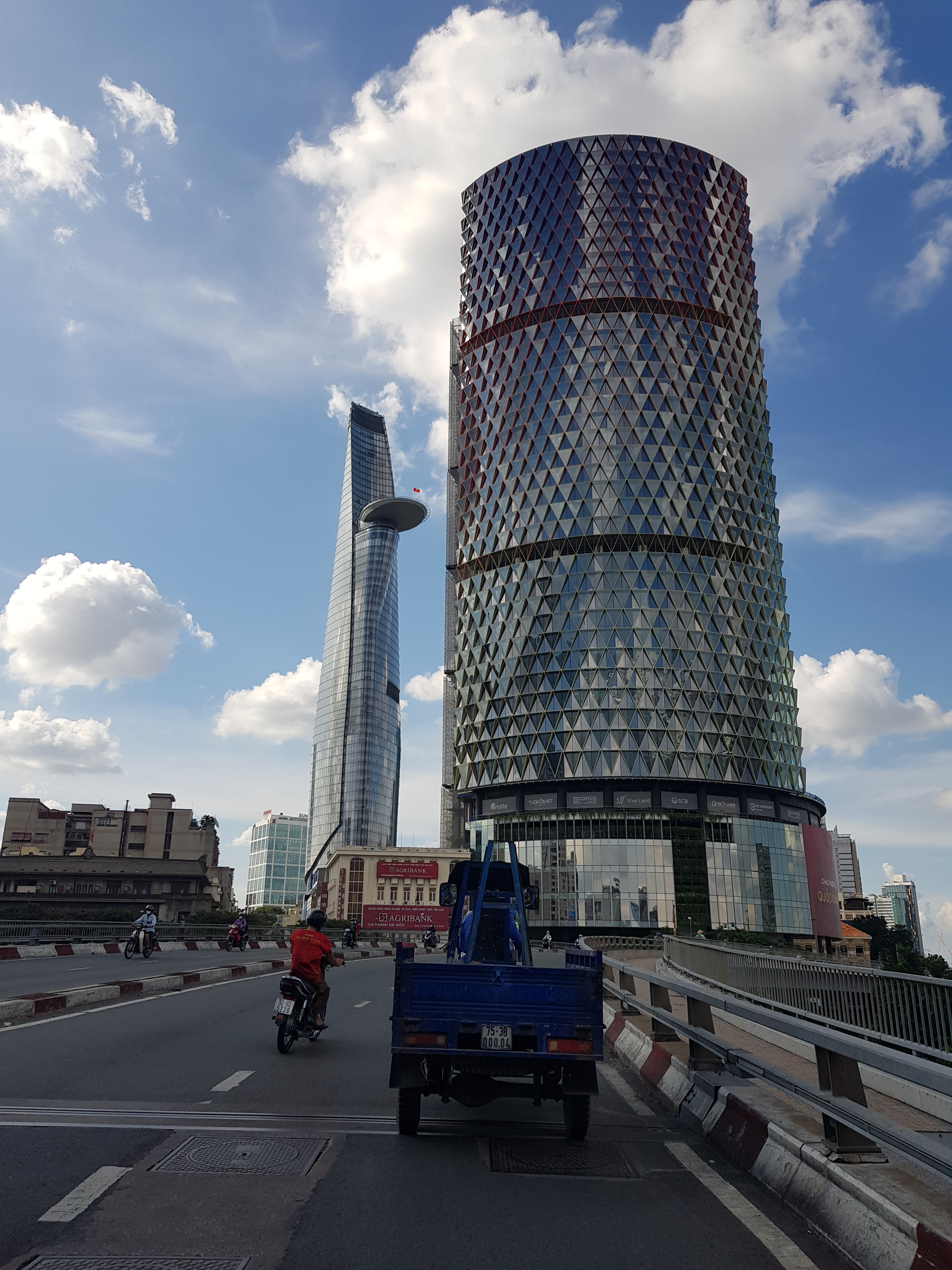
Bitexco Financial Tower and IFC One Saigon (left to right)

Thiên Nam Restaurant, a French-Chinese cuisine restaurant opened since 1952
