= MCB Group =

Mauritian financial services holding company

MCB Group Limited
- Type: Public
- Traded as: SEM: MCBG; SEMDEX component
- Industry: Financial services
- Predecessor: The Mauritius Commercial Bank Ltd (as listed entity, 1989–2014)
- Founded: 5 August 2013; 13 years ago
- Headquarters: 9–15 Sir William Newton Street, Port Louis, Mauritius
- Area served: Mauritius, Indian Ocean islands, Sub-Saharan Africa
- Key people: Jayananda Nirsimloo (Chairperson); Jean Michel Ng Tseung (Group Chief Executive)
- Services: Banking, investment banking, asset management, private equity, factoring, leasing, microfinance
- Operating income: ▲ Rs 47.1 billion (FY2026)
- Net income: ▲ Rs 20.1 billion (FY2026)
- Total assets: ▲ Rs 1.28 trillion (FY2026)
- Total equity: ▲ Rs 133.6 billion (FY2026)
- Number of employees: c. 4,900 (2025)
- Subsidiaries: The Mauritius Commercial Bank Ltd, MCB Madagascar, MCB Seychelles, MCB Maldives, MCB Capital Markets
- Website: mcbgroup.com

MCB Group Limited is a Mauritian financial services holding company headquartered in Port Louis. It owns The Mauritius Commercial Bank Ltd (MCB), the country's oldest and largest bank. It also has banking, non-banking financial and other investments in Mauritius, Madagascar, Seychelles, the Maldives, Réunion, Mayotte and France, with offices in South Africa, Kenya, Nigeria and the United Arab Emirates. Altogether it is present in eleven countries.

The company was incorporated in 2013, and in 2014 it replaced MCB on the Stock Exchange of Mauritius (SEM) when the bank's banking and non-banking activities were separated. It is the largest company on the SEM. At 30 June 2025 it had a market capitalisation of Rs 111.6 billion, about 36% of the SEMDEX index.

For the year ended 30 June 2026 the group reported:

- profit attributable to ordinary shareholders of Rs 20.1 billion;
- total assets of Rs 1.28 trillion;
- a return on equity of 16.0%.

About 56% of that profit came from MCB's activities outside Mauritius, chiefly energy and commodities finance in Africa.

== History ==
=== Formation (2013–2014) ===
Until 2014 The Mauritius Commercial Bank Ltd was both a licensed bank and, through its subsidiaries, the holding company of the group's other businesses. Its shares had been listed on the SEM since 1989. MCB Group Ltd was incorporated as a public company on 5 August 2013 to become the ultimate holding company. The aim was to separate the banking and non-banking businesses and give the group more flexibility to raise capital.

The restructuring was carried out under a scheme of arrangement that took effect on 21 February 2014:

- MCB's shareholders exchanged their shares one-for-one for MCB Group shares.
- A new intermediate company, MCB Investment Holding Ltd, took over all the group's banking interests.
- The non-banking subsidiaries previously owned by the bank were transferred to MCB Group.

MCB's shares last traded on 24 March 2014 and were delisted on 2 April 2014; MCB Group shares were listed in their place. Pierre Guy Noël, who had led MCB since 1996, became the group's first chief executive in April 2014.

In June 2015 the Bank of Mauritius approved the transfer to MCB Group of the bank's Rs 4.5 billion floating-rate subordinated notes due 2023. The notes had been issued in July 2013 and drew Rs 6.3 billion of applications.

=== Regional changes (2015–2024) ===
In 2015 Société Générale acquired a 65% majority stake in MCB Moçambique, which was renamed Société Générale Moçambique; MCB kept 35%. In May 2024 the group agreed to sell its remaining stake alongside Société Générale's, and booked a one-off loss on the sale in 2023/24. MCB Microfinance was set up in July 2016 to lend to micro-enterprises, and opened an office in Rodrigues in 2017.

During the COVID-19 pandemic, group profit fell to Rs 7.9 billion in 2019/20 after impairment charges of Rs 5.1 billion. In line with directives from banking regulators, the group declared no dividend for that year. Its banks granted loan moratoriums, and MCB lent about Rs 3 billion under the Bank of Mauritius's Special Relief Fund.

In 2020 holders of the subordinated notes were offered convertible preference shares in exchange. More than 75% of the notes were converted, and the rest were repaid when they matured in August 2023. Mauritius was on the Financial Action Task Force list of jurisdictions under increased monitoring from February 2020 to October 2021, which the group described as a major issue for the financial sector. On 15 May 2024 MCB Group became the first SEM-listed company to reach a market capitalisation of Rs 100 billion.

=== Since 2025 ===
In January 2025 the Supreme Court of Mauritius approved the merger of Promotion and Development Ltd (PAD), an associate of the group, with Caudan Development Ltd, which was then delisted. In June 2025 the group launched a strategic plan, "Vision 2030" (see below). That year all its banks also moved onto a single core banking system, Temenos Transact. In August 2025 it bought out the minority shareholders of Compagnie des Villages de Vacances de l'Isle de France (COVIFRA), owner of the Club Med resort at Pointe aux Canonniers, which was then delisted.

In the 2025/26 financial year:

- profit rose 11.3% to Rs 20.1 billion, although the effective tax rate rose from 21.5% to 26.4% after new tax measures in Mauritius;
- MCB issued US$400 million of notes on the London Stock Exchange and raised a US$450 million syndicated loan;
- the group launched a US$1 billion African trade finance credit line and set up an Africa trading desk.

== Strategy ==
Vision 2030, launched in June 2025, aims for the group to be "the leading Banking Group in our Home markets and a top-tier African CIB and Private Banking institution". It rests on three aims:

- to lead in the home markets of Mauritius, Madagascar, Seychelles and the Maldives;
- to build a corporate, investment and private banking business across Africa;
- to be a preferred employer.

The plan relies on commercial offices in South Africa, Kenya, Nigeria, the United Arab Emirates and France. The group is also considering offices in London and Abidjan. Its only published numerical target is for women to hold 40% of middle and senior management posts by 2026. The figure was 36.6% in 2025.

== Structure ==
The group is organised in three clusters: banking, non-banking financial services, and other investments. The table lists the main companies at 30 June 2026, with the group's effective shareholding.

Cluster	Company	Country	Holding	Activity
Banking	MCB Investment Holding Ltd	Mauritius	100%	Intermediate holding company for the banking businesses
Banking	The Mauritius Commercial Bank Ltd	Mauritius	100%	Commercial bank; representative offices in France, South Africa, Kenya, Nigeria and the UAE
Banking	MCB (Seychelles) Ltd	Seychelles	100%	Commercial bank
Banking	MCB (Madagascar) SA	Madagascar	90%	Commercial bank
Banking	MCB (Maldives) Private Ltd	Maldives	100%	Commercial bank
Banking	Banque Française Commerciale Océan Indien	Réunion, Mayotte, France	49.99% (associate)	Commercial bank, jointly owned with Société Générale
Non-banking financial	MCB Capital Markets Ltd	Mauritius	100%	Investment banking, asset management, stockbroking, registry and structured products
Non-banking financial	MCB Equity Fund Ltd	Mauritius	100%	Private equity
Non-banking financial	MCB Factors Ltd	Mauritius	100%	Factoring
Non-banking financial	MCB Microfinance Ltd	Mauritius	100%	Microfinance
Non-banking financial	MCB Leasing Ltd	Mauritius	57.73% (through Fincorp)	Leasing and deposit-taking
Non-banking financial	MCB Real Assets Ltd	Mauritius	100%	Real estate and hospitality investment
Non-banking financial	Credit Guarantee Insurance Co Ltd	Mauritius	40% (associate)	Credit insurance
Other investments	Fincorp Investment Ltd	Mauritius	57.73%	Listed investment company
Other investments	Promotion and Development Ltd	Mauritius	Associate	Listed property and investment company; owns Caudan Development
Other investments	MCB Properties Ltd	Mauritius	100%	Property
Other investments	Blue Penny Museum	Mauritius	99.63%	Museum of art and history
Other investments	COVIFRA	Mauritius	100%	Owner of a hotel property

=== Banking ===
The Mauritius Commercial Bank Ltd accounts for about 91% of the group's assets. It has about 1.2 million customers, 38 branches and kiosks and 182 ATMs in Mauritius. It holds about 39% of domestic credit and about half of rupee deposits. In 2025/26 it earned a profit after tax of Rs 18.5 billion. Its international business lends mainly to energy, metals and infrastructure companies in Africa.

The group's other banks earned the following in 2024/25:

- MCB Seychelles contributed Rs 712 million to group profit, helped by a one-off tax gain.
- MCB Madagascar made a profit of 16.1 billion ariary (Rs 162 million).
- MCB Maldives contributed Rs 322 million. Its deposits grew 37% after HSBC left the Maldivian market. MCB began operating in Malé on 4 May 2008.
- BFCOI, run jointly with Société Générale, earned €11.8 million, of which the group's share was Rs 294 million.

=== Non-banking financial services ===
- MCB Capital Markets provides corporate finance, stockbroking, registry and asset management. It manages about US$1.2 billion across 17 funds and structured products.
- MCB Equity Fund is a US$100 million fund that invests expansion capital in African companies. At June 2025 its net asset value was Rs 3.8 billion.
- MCB Factors provides factoring.
- MCB Leasing provides leasing and takes deposits; its lease portfolio was Rs 5.9 billion.
- MCB Microfinance had lent Rs 1.8 billion through 8,201 loans by June 2025.

=== Other investments ===
The group's main other investments are Fincorp Investment and its associate PAD, a property company that owns the Caudan Waterfront developer Caudan Development. In 2024/25 Fincorp made a consolidated loss of Rs 202 million, mainly because of damage to Caudan from Cyclone Belal; PAD recovered in 2025/26. COVIFRA owns the Club Med resort at Pointe aux Canonniers. The group's corporate social responsibility work is carried out by the MCB Forward Foundation.

=== Profit by business ===
In 2024/25 the sources of group profit were:

- MCB's foreign-sourced activities: 64%;
- MCB's domestic business: 26%;
- the foreign banking subsidiaries and associates: 8%;
- the non-banking businesses: 2%.

In 2025/26 the banking cluster earned Rs 26.4 billion before tax, non-banking financial services Rs 656 million and other investments Rs 491 million. Home Markets provided 47% of operating income (Rs 22.1 billion) and African corporate, investment and private banking 53% (Rs 24.9 billion).

== Financial performance ==
Key figures (Rs million, year to 30 June)
Year	Operating income	Profit attributable to shareholders	Total assets	Shareholders' funds	Earnings per share (Rs)	Dividend per share (Rs)
2015	13,214	5,722	280,013	35,933	24.04	–
2016	14,404	6,626	317,705	40,730	27.82	8.75
2017	15,506	6,702	345,210	45,949	28.10	9.25
2018	16,951	7,221	386,370	51,306	30.26	10.00
2019	20,226	9,434	471,418	56,509	39.51	13.00
2020	21,954	7,912	532,114	62,545	33.09	nil
2021	22,404	8,019	683,133	72,892	33.51	16.75
2022	23,845	9,637	728,128	77,912	40.14	13.90
2023	31,792	14,133	829,981	89,763	57.67	20.25
2024	37,010	16,045	938,747	103,259	63.65	23.00
2025	42,160	18,065	1,006,994	117,703	70.15	25.50
2026	47,052	20,114	1,283,413	133,614	76.55	27.50
Sources: annual reports 2015–2025 and FY2026 results. 2019 assets as restated in 2020. EPS for 2024 is diluted; from 2019 basic EPS as restated. The 2021 dividend covered the profits of both 2019/20 and 2020/21.

Key ratios (group), %
Year	Return on equity	Capital adequacy (Tier 1)	Cost-to-income	Non-performing loans
2016	17.3	18.3 (15.3)	40.1	6.2
2017	15.5	18.8 (16.6)	41.2	6.2
2018	14.8	17.1 (15.3)	40.1	4.5
2019	17.5	17.3 (15.7)	37.1	4.1
2020	13.3	18.6 (17.2)	35.5	4.2
2021	11.8	17.4 (16.1)	36.9	3.6
2022	12.8	18.1 (16.8)	38.3	3.7
2023	16.9	19.2 (16.7)	35.4	3.3
2024	16.6	20.5 (18.0)	36.7	3.1
2025	16.4	22.0 (19.6)	37.4	3.0
2026	16.0	20.3 (18.1)	38.1	2.0
Sources: annual reports 2020 and 2025; FY2026 results. NPL ratio is gross from 2021.

=== Capital, funding and credit ratings ===
At 30 June 2026 the group's capital adequacy ratio was 20.3% and its Tier 1 ratio 18.1%. Total capital was Rs 143 billion and risk-weighted assets Rs 702 billion. MCB, which accounts for over 80% of risk-weighted assets, is a domestic systemically important bank. It must therefore hold at least 13% Tier 1 capital and 15% total capital.

The group's credit ratings are held by MCB rather than the holding company:

- Moody's rates MCB's deposits Baa3/P-3, with a negative outlook.
- CARE Ratings (Africa) gives it an AAA domestic issuer rating, with a stable outlook.

MCB's main market funding comprises:

- US$300 million of notes due 2028 and US$400 million due 2031, issued under a US$3 billion medium-term note programme listed in London;
- a US$147 million Tier 2 loan from the African Development Bank, due 2033.

== Shares and dividends ==
MCB Group's ordinary shares trade on the Official Market of the SEM. They are included in the MSCI Frontier Markets Africa and Frontier Markets EMEA indices. At 30 June 2026 there were 263,929,938 ordinary shares in issue. The number grows each year through the scrip dividend scheme, conversions of preference shares and employee share options.

Share price and market capitalisation at 30 June
Year	Share price (Rs)	Market capitalisation (Rs million)	Share of SEMDEX
2016	211.00	50,257	25.2%
2017	272.00	64,900	25.6%
2019	289.00	69,042	27.3%
2020	236.00	56,464	28.0%
2021	273.00	65,381	28.9%
2022	307.50	73,975	27.2%
2023	313.25	77,214	31.3%
2024	380.00	96,187	36.1%
2025	430.25	111,617	36.3%
Sources: annual reports 2016, 2017, 2021, 2022 and 2025.

At 30 June 2025 the shares traded at 6.1 times earnings and 0.9 times net asset value, with a dividend yield of 5.9%. They reached a record Rs 475.25 in August 2025.

The group aims to pay out about a third of its profits as dividends, normally in an interim and a final payment each year. The dividend for 2025/26 was Rs 27.50 per share. Since September 2021 shareholders have been able to take dividends as new shares under a scrip scheme, priced at a 3% discount to the market. About 30% of the July 2025 dividend was taken in shares.

In 2020 the group issued 339.6 million convertible, redeemable, non-voting preference shares at Rs 10 each. They pay a fixed non-cumulative dividend of 4.7% and have been convertible into ordinary shares at each dividend date since June 2022. They are listed on the SEM, and 84.5 million remained outstanding at 30 June 2026. Employees can acquire shares through a share option scheme and a long-term incentive plan.

== Ownership ==
At 30 June 2025 MCB Group had 23,637 ordinary shareholders. Individuals held 46.2% of the shares and foreign investors about 8%. The largest institutional shareholders were:

Shareholder	Holding (30 June 2025)
National Pensions Fund	7.2%
State Insurance Company of Mauritius	4.5%
Swan Life	3.9%
Promotion and Development Ltd	2.4%
BNYM SA/NV a/c Eastspring Investments SICAV-FIS	1.5%
MCB Ltd Superannuation Fund	1.4%
National Savings Fund	1.0%

== Governance ==
The board has ten members:

- Chairperson: Jayananda Nirsimloo, formerly chair and chief executive of KPMG France.
- Executive directors: Jean Michel Ng Tseung (Group Chief Executive) and Dipak Chummun (Group Chief Financial Officer).
- Independent non-executive directors: Stephen Davidson (chair of the risk committee), Cédric Jeannot, Georges Michael David Lising, Maya Makanjee, Anna Margaretha Roets and San T. Singaravelloo (chair of the audit committee).
- Non-executive director: Yvan Legris.

Role	Holder	Term
Chairperson	Gérard Hardy	to September 2016
Chairperson	Didier Harel	September 2016 – November 2024
Chairperson	Jayananda Nirsimloo	November 2024 –
Group Chief Executive	Pierre Guy Noël	April 2014 – March 2023
Group Chief Executive	Jean Michel Ng Tseung	March 2023 –

Ng Tseung was named Chief Executive Designate in September 2021, when Noël reached retirement age. Noël, who had led MCB for 27 years, died in December 2023. Thierry Hebraud has been chief executive of MCB since January 2024. The group's auditor is Deloitte.

== Employees ==
Group workforce (at 30 June)
2016	2017	2018	2019	2020	2021	2022	2023	2024	2025
3,200+	3,386	3,409	3,617	3,700+	c. 3,700	c. 3,900	c. 4,100	c. 4,400	c. 4,900
Sources: annual reports 2016–2025.

== Sustainability ==
The group's sustainability framework is called "Success Beyond Numbers". MCB was a founding signatory of the United Nations Principles for Responsible Banking in 2019, and has applied the Equator Principles since 2012. The group has an MSCI ESG rating of A and is a constituent of the SEM Sustainability Index. In 2026 MCB raised its sustainable finance facility for Mauritian customers to Rs 25 billion. The MCB Forward Foundation spent Rs 73.0 million on community projects in 2022/23, Rs 57.4 million in 2023/24 and Rs 52.3 million in 2024/25.

== Recognition ==
In 2024 The Banker named MCB its African Bank of the Year, the first time a Mauritian bank had won the award. In The Banker's 2025 ranking of the world's top 1,000 banks by Tier 1 capital, the group was 571st worldwide and 12th in Africa. African Business described MCB in 2025 as the largest African bank outside South Africa by Tier 1 capital.

== See also ==
- List of banks in Mauritius
- Economy of Mauritius
