= Banque Franco-Chinoise =

Former bank in China and French Indochina

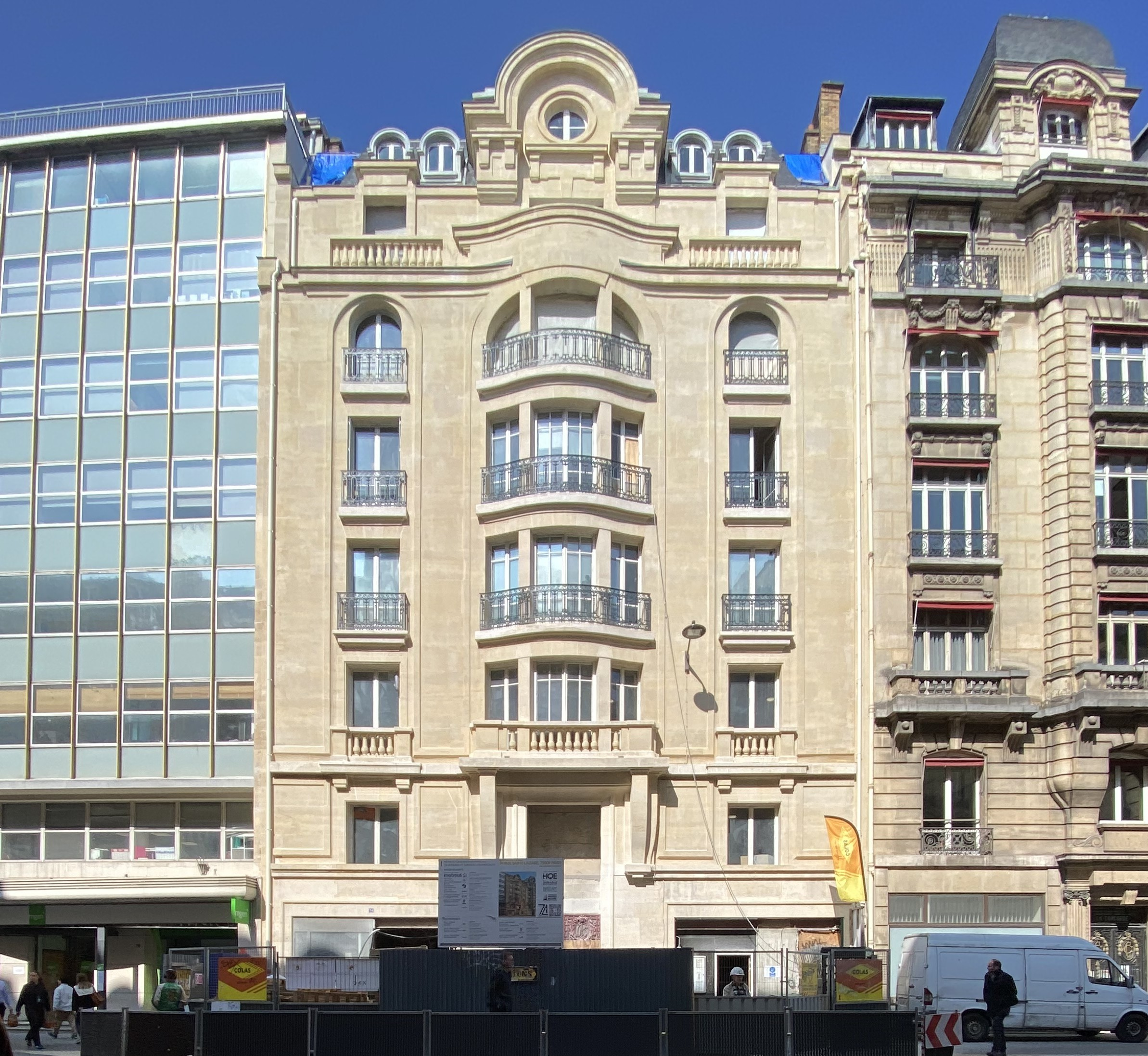
Former BFC headquarters in Paris, 74 rue Saint-Lazare

The Banque Franco-Chinoise (lit. 'Franco-Chinese Bank'), full name Banque Franco-Chinoise pour le Commerce et l’Industrie (Chinese: 中法工商银行), was a French bank with operations in China and French Indochina, and later in the Indian Ocean and the French West Indies. In 1925 it succeeded the Société française de gérance de la Banque industrielle de Chine, an asset management company that had been formed in October 1922 following the closure of the Banque Industrielle de Chine.

In 1964, after the loss of much of its original activity in Asia, its name was changed to Banque Française pour le Commerce, and in 1968, to Banque Française Commerciale, thus preserving the acronym BFC. The BFC brand survives in Banque Française Commerciale Océan Indien, since 2003 a joint venture between Mauritius Commercial Bank and Société Générale with operations in Réunion and Mayotte.

== Société française de gérance de la Banque industrielle de Chine (1922-1925) ==
The Société française de gérance de la Banque industrielle de Chine was created in October 1922 to manage the Banque Industrielle de Chine (BIC), which had been under bankruptcy protection since July 1921. Its chairman was Gaston Griolet, the chairman of the Banque de Paris et des Pays-Bas (BPPB) which had a leading role in the BIC's restructuring; Georges Carrère was appointed general manager (French: directeur général). A management agreement was immediately signed between the BIC and the Société de gérance, allowing the latter to take over the administration of the former. In addition to the BPPB, shareholders of the Société de gérance included the Banque Française pour le Commerce et l'Industrie and the Banque de la Seine. Its first annual general meeting in December 1923 was held in the premises of the BPPB, emphasizing the latter's dominance in the new entity. The registered office of the Société de gérance was the same as that of the BIC, 74 rue Saint-Lazare in Paris. By 1924 it had revived the BIC's activities in most of its past branches in France (Lyon and Marseille), China Beijing, Guangzhou, Hankou, Hong Kong, Shanghai and Tianjin), and French Indochina (Haiphong, Hanoi and Saigon).

== Banque Franco-Chinoise (1925-1964) ==
On 26 November 1925, the shareholders of the Société de gérance approved its renaming as the Franco-Chinese Bank. The bank developed its network in Indochina, opening new branch offices in Vinh (June 1927), Tourane (September 1927), and Huế (September 1927). A new art deco building for its branch in Hanoi was inaugurated on 27 October 1930; as of 2022 it still existed and was used by the Vietnamese Ministry of Industry and Trade. By 1931 another branch office existed in Quy Nhon, and by 1932 in Phnom Penh.

The bank faced difficulties in the late 1930s. It closed its branch in Haiphong from October 1936. In late 1936 it was persuaded by Jean Monnet to partner with the China Development Finance Corporation for infrastructure development in China, but the plan was compromised by the second Sino-Japanese War. Its capital was restructured in 1938 with participation by the BPPB, the Banque de l'Indochine, and Lazard frères & Cie. By 1939, the bank only retained Asian branch offices in Beijing, Shanghai and Tianjin in Chine, and Hanoi, Saigon and Phnom Penh in Indochina.

In 1951, having lost its Chinese business to the country's Communist Revolution (the branches formally closed in 1955) and realizing that its geographical concentration in Indochina entailed high risk, the bank sought to diversify by establishing branches in French Madagascar. After the French defeat in 1954 at Diên Biên Phu, the bank closed its offices in North Vietnam but still expanded in South Vietnam and Cambodia, with branches in Battambang and Kampong Cham.

In 1960, the Banque de l'Indochine purchased the shares in the Franco-Chinese Bank formerly held by the BPPB and Lazard. In 1963, Cambodia nationalized its banking sector, though the BFC was allowed to retain a representative office in Phnom Penh. By then, its remaining branch locations were in Saigon, Chợ Lớn and Khánh Hưng in South Vietnam, and Tananarive and Tamatave in Madagascar.

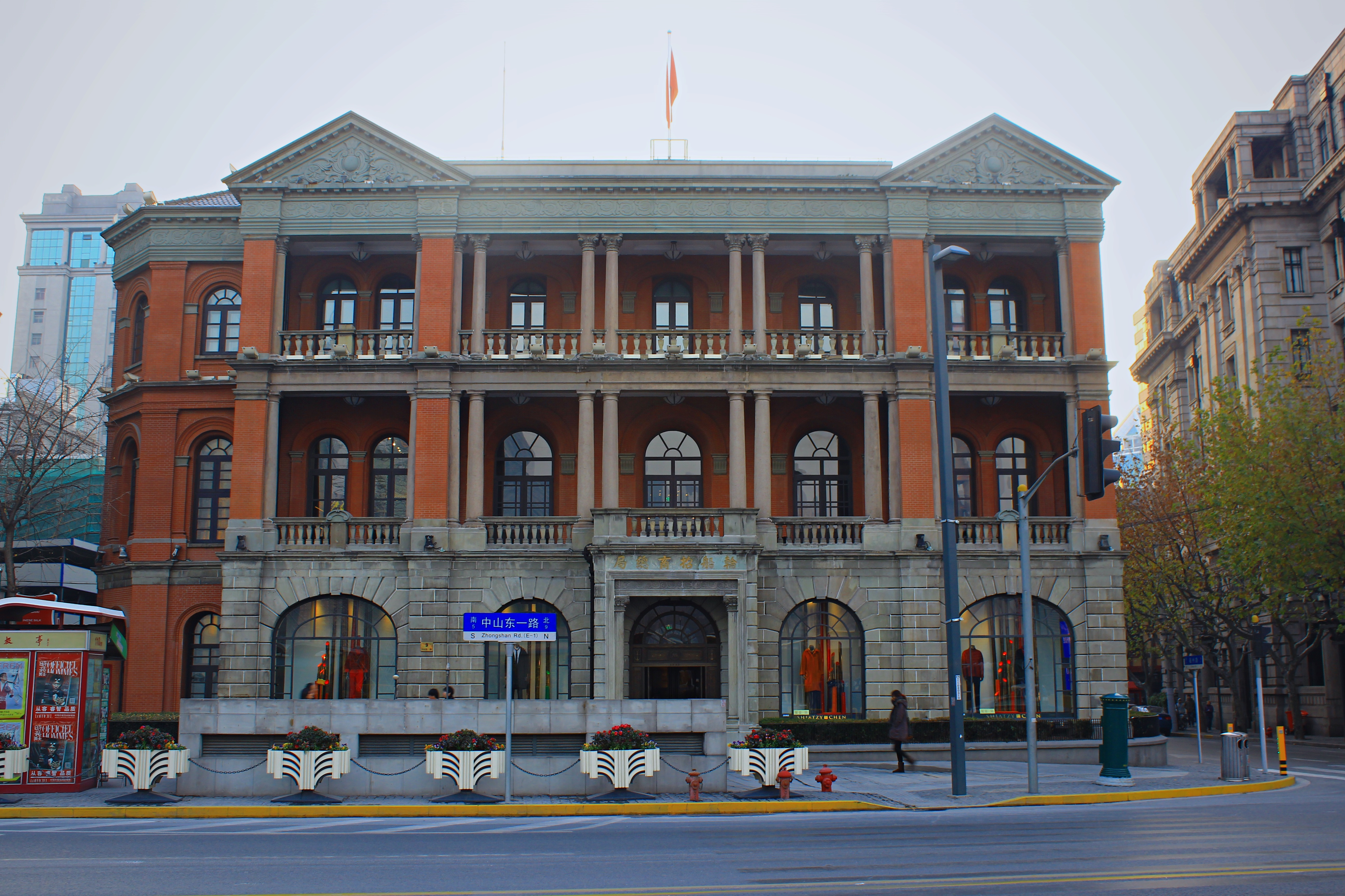
China Merchants Steam Navigation Company building on No. 9 Bund, where the BFC had its Shanghai branch

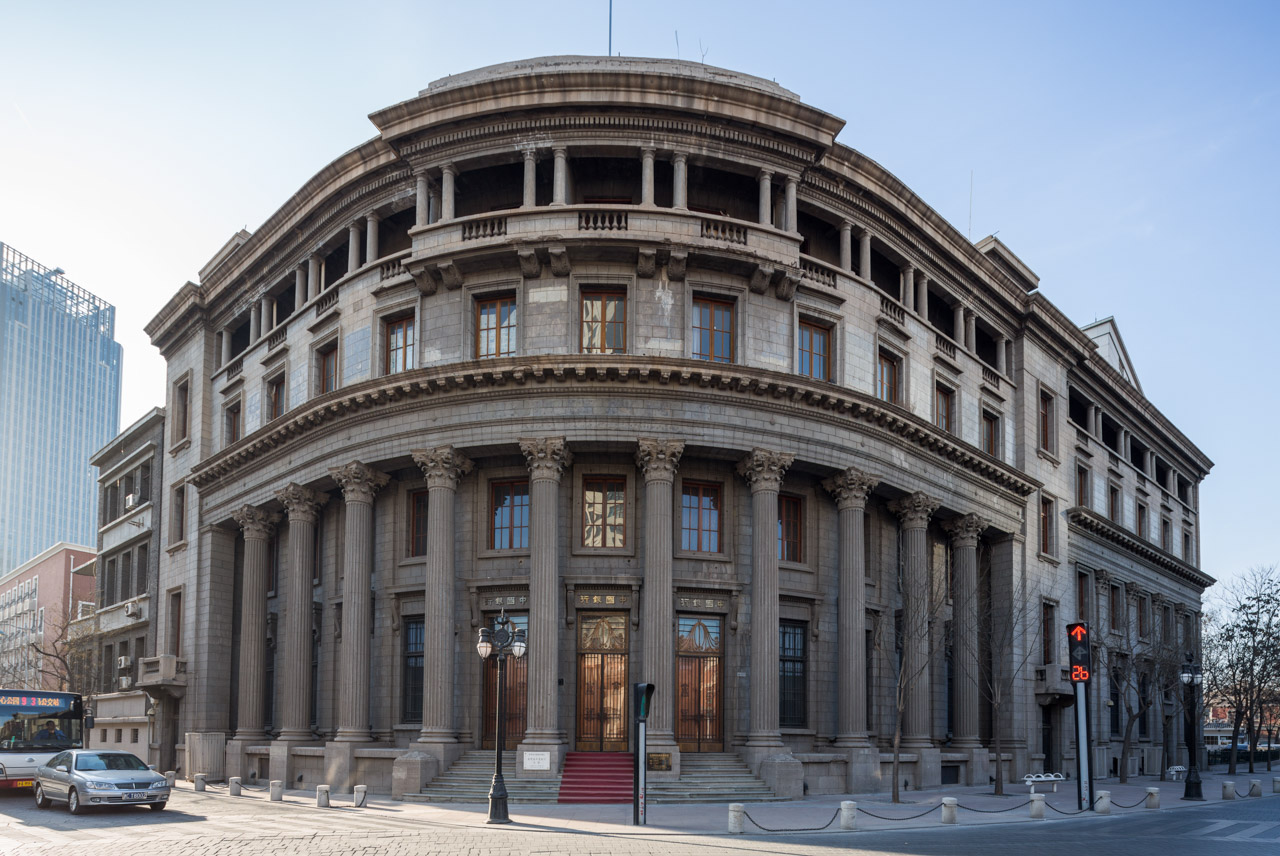
Former branch building in Tianjin (rebuilt in 1933), now Northern Finance Institute

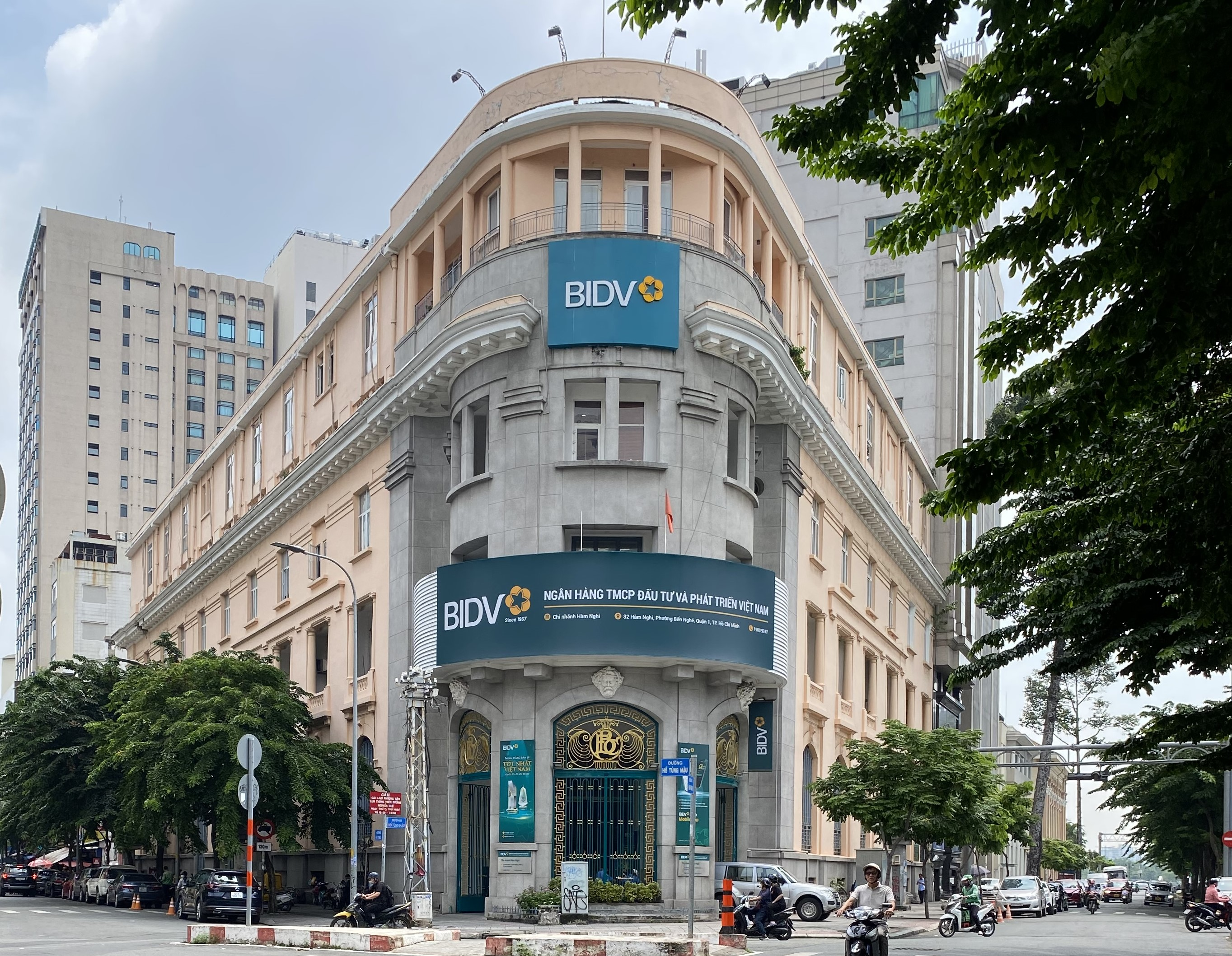
Former branch building in Saigon, originally built for the Société financière française et coloniale in 1926 and remodeled for the BFC in the late 1930s; then Mekong Housing Bank until 2015 and now is BIDV Hàm Nghi Branch in Ho Chi Minh City

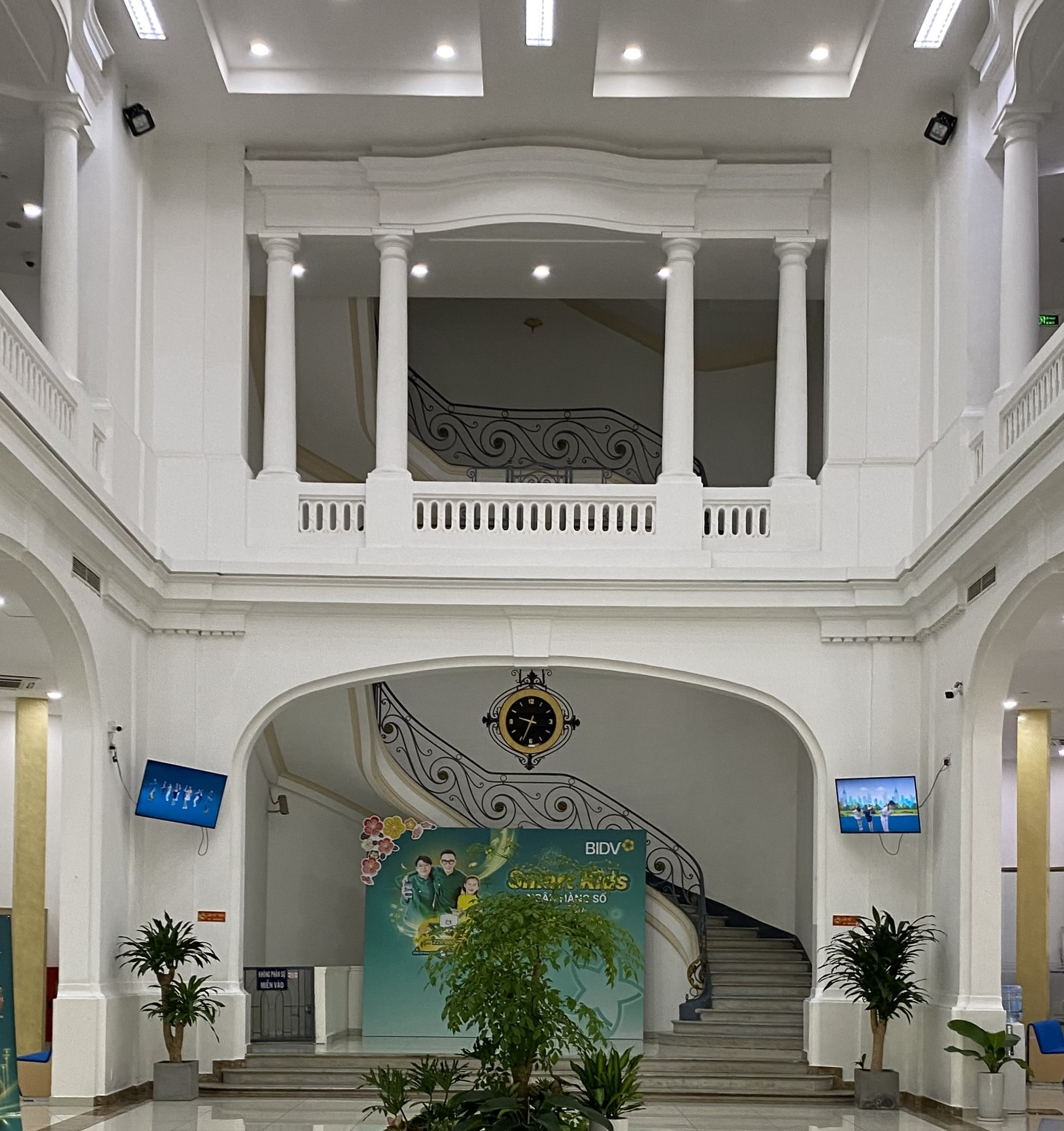
Interior of the former Saigon branch, in 2023

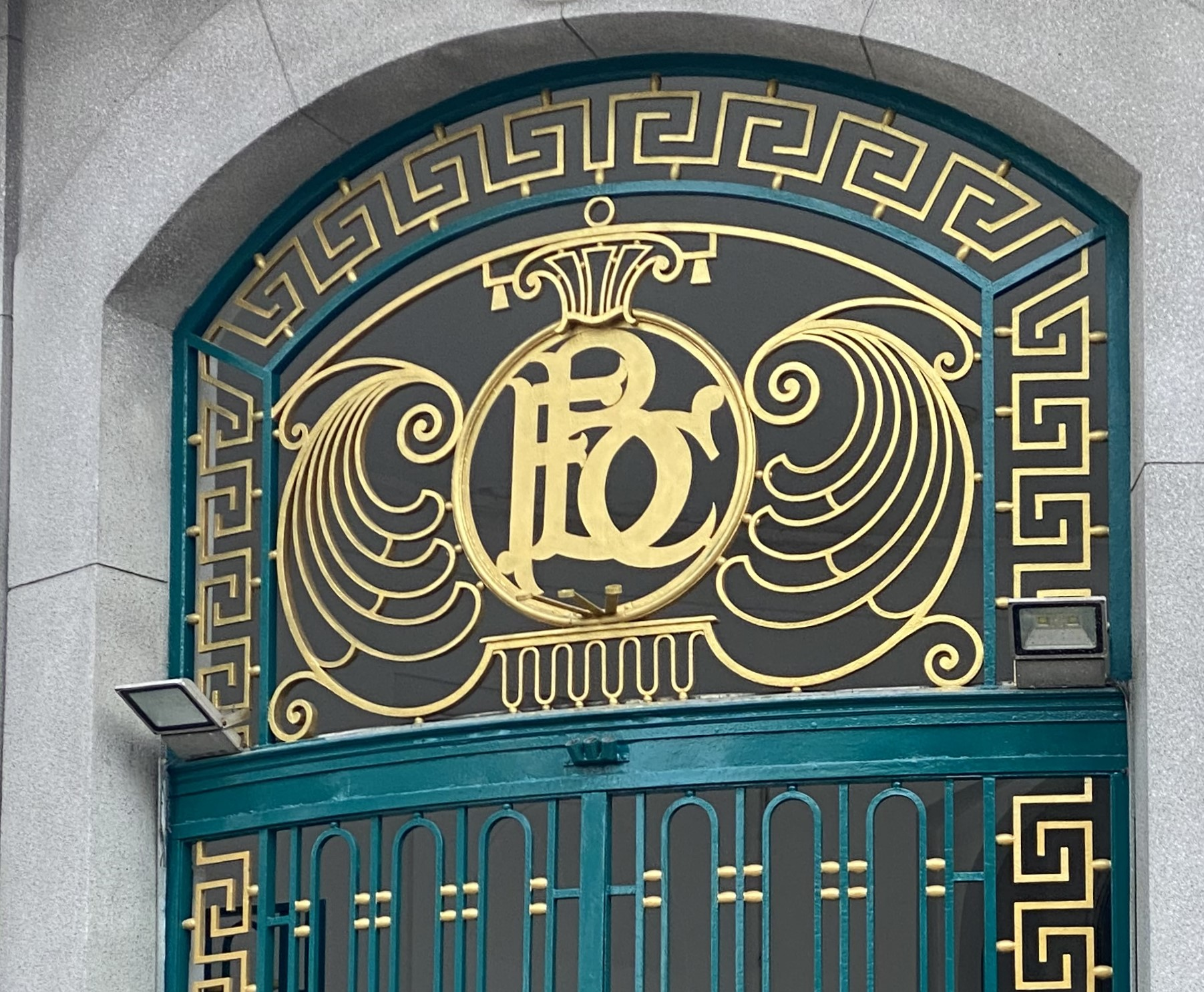
Ironwork at the former Saigon branch, displaying the BFC monogram

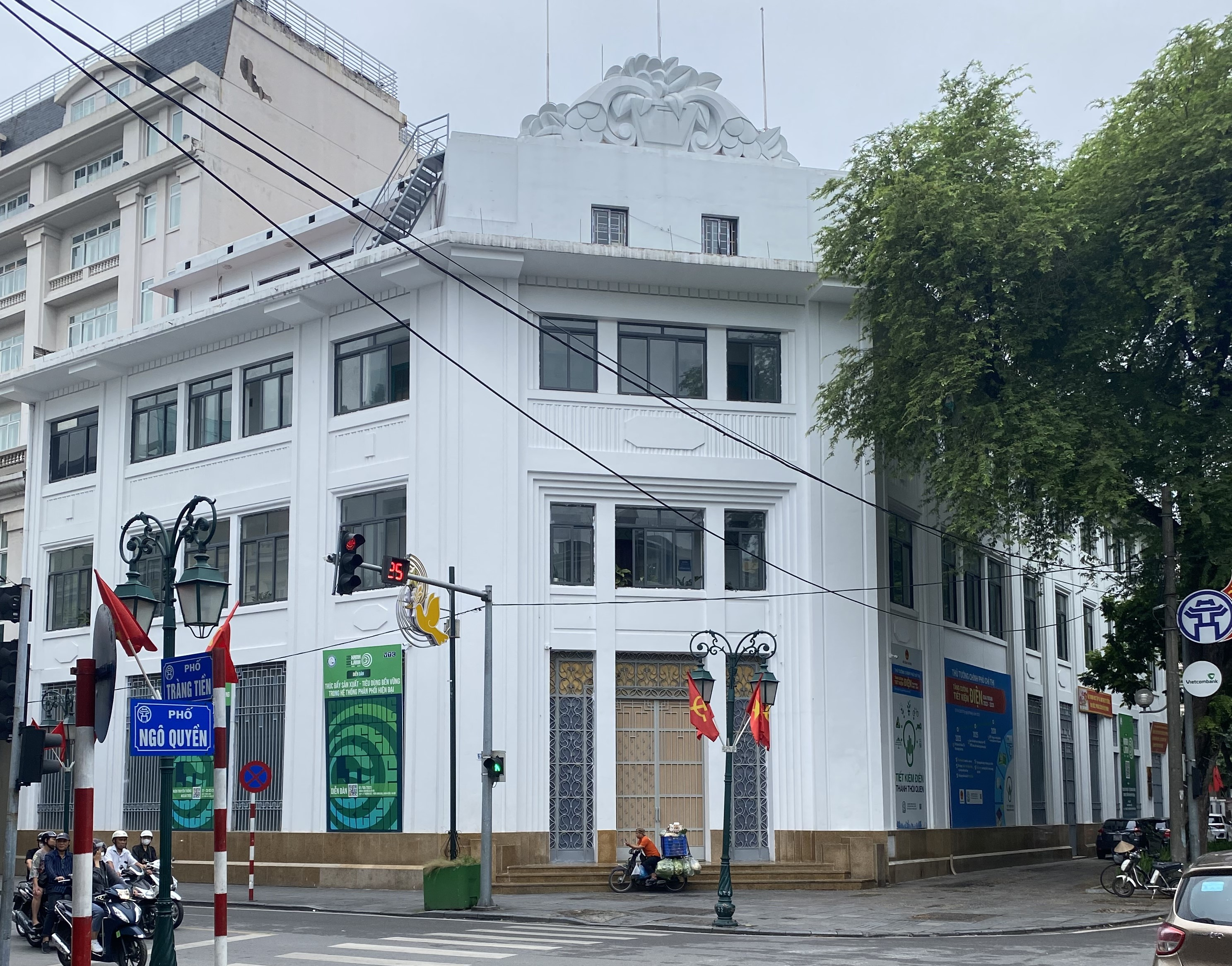
Former branch in Hanoi

== Banque Française pour le Commerce (1964-1968) ==
In 1965, the government of South Vietnam wished to create a domestic bank sector. The BFC participated in the creation of the Banque pour le Commerce, l'Industrie et l'Agriculture (Vietnamese: Nông Công Thuơng Ngân Hàng) with South Vietnamese management seconded from BFC.

A change in French law in 1967 liberalized branching, enabling BFC to increase the number of its branches in mainland France.

== Banque Française Commerciale (since 1968) ==
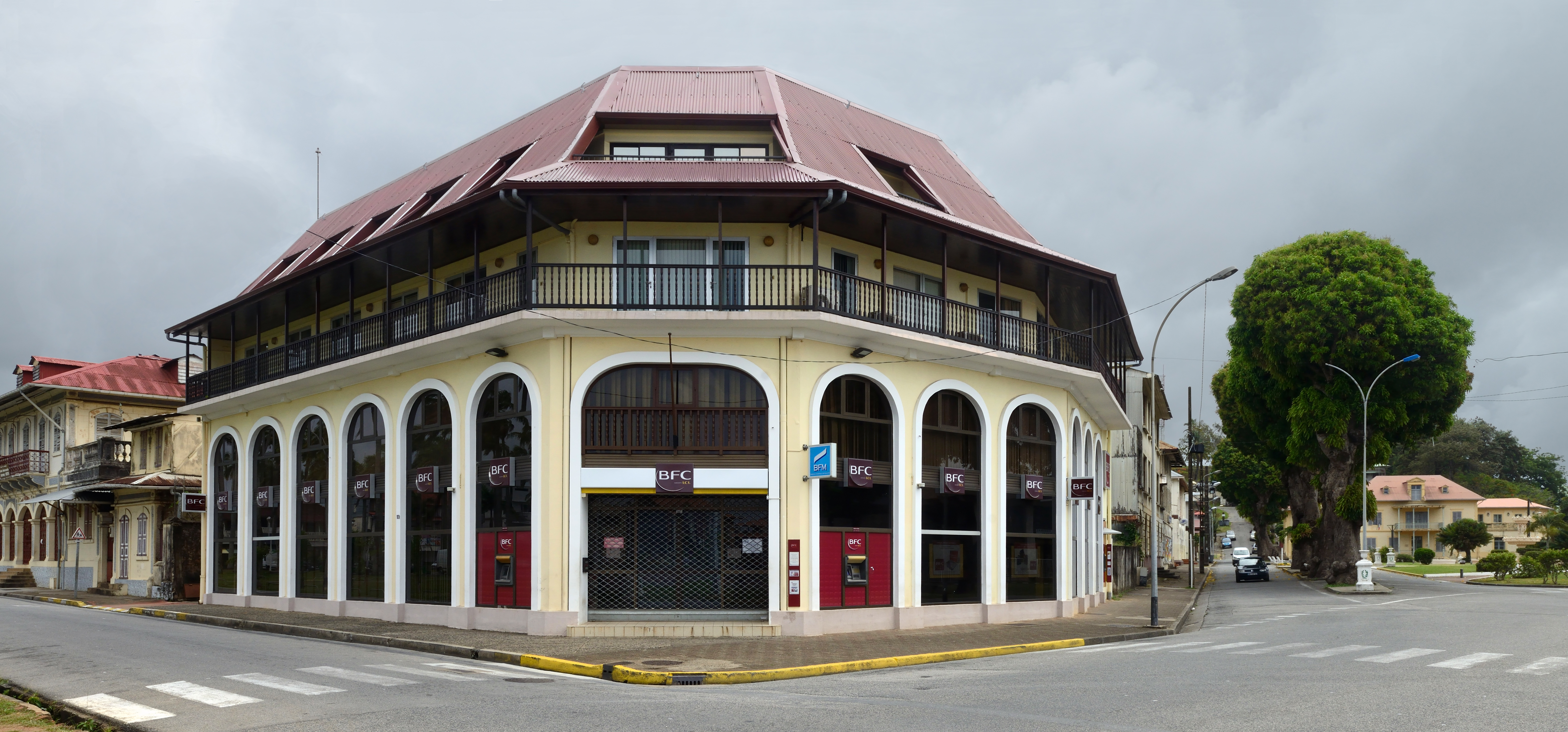
BFC branch in Cayenne, French Guiana, in 2013

In Madagascar, the BFC's operations were affected by political turmoil that commenced in 1972. In 1975, the Malagasy Republic nationalized its operations and transferred them to the Banque Financière et Commerciale Malagache. That same year, the fall of Saigon put an end to the BFC's activity in South Vietnam. In Cambodia, during the terror launched by the Khmer Rouge regime, the bank's representative, an ethnic Chinese, and his family were all assassinated.

BFC decided to pivot towards the Indian Ocean. In 1976 it established a branch in Réunion, and also established a branch in Mayotte at the request of the French Government, as the island's pre-existing banking services disappeared after its split from the Comoros. In 1979, BFC acquired the Banque Antillaise with operations in the French West Indies, and opened a branch in French Guiana. It also opened branches in 1981 in the Seychelles, and in 1982 in Dominica.

By early 1975, the Banque de l'Indochine held 79 percent of the BFC's equity. In 1985, Banque Indosuez, the successor entity of the Banque de l'Indochine since 1975, decided to split BFC into three entities with respective operations in France (BFC-France), Reunion, Mayotte and the Seychelles (Banque Française Commerciale Océan Indien / BFCOI); and the French West Indies and Guiana (Banque Française Commerciale Antilles-Guyane / BFCAG). BFC-France was acquired in 1989 by Istituto Bancario San Paolo di Torino. In 1992, Mauritius Commercial Bank acquired BFCOI, of which Société Générale purchased 50 percent in 2003. BFCAG was acquired by Crédit Agricole in 1996 together with the rest of Banque Indosuez, and was fully absorbed into Credit Agricole's subsidiary LCL S.A. in 2015.

== Leadership ==
The following individuals were chairmen of the board of BFC:

- Gaston Griolet (October 1922-January 1931)
- Georges Goy (January 1931-January 1936)
- Maurice Le Gallen (January 1936 – 1938)
- André Laurent-Atthalin (1938-early 1940s)
- Émile Oudot (early 1940s-August 1956)

Goerges Carrère was the bank's general manager until joining the board of directors in March 1936. He had no successor on that position.

== See also ==
- Banque Industrielle de Chine
- Banque Franco-Japonaise
- Russo-Chinese Bank
- Deutsch-Asiatische Bank
- List of banks in France
