= List of banks in Madagascar =

This is a list of commercial banks in Madagascar, as reported in local media.

== List of commercial banks ==
- AccèsBanque Madagascar (ABM)
- AFG Bank
- Baobab Banque Madagascar
- Bank of Africa Madagascar (BOA), part of Bank of Africa Group
- BGFI Bank Madagascar, part of BGFIBank Group
- Banque Malgache de l'Océan Indien (BMOI), part of BCP Group
- BNI Madagascar
- Caisse d’Epargne de Madagascar
- MCB Madagascar, part of Mauritius Commercial Bank Group
- Banque SBM Madagascar, part of State Bank of Mauritius Group
- SIPEM Banque
- Société Générale Madagasikara, undergoing purchase from Société Générale by BRED Banque populaire

== See also ==
- Central Bank of Madagascar
- Economy of Madagascar
- List of banks in Africa
