= MCB Madagascar =

MCB Madagascar SA
- Type: Private company
- Industry: Finance
- Founded: 1992
- Headquarters: MCB Head Office, Novotel Business Center, Alarobia, Antananarivo, Madagascar
- Products: Banking
- Parent: MCB Group

MCB Madagascar is a commercial bank in Madagascar. It is a member of the Mauritius Commercial Bank Group of companies headquartered in Port Louis, Mauritius.

== History ==
The bank was established in 1992 by two banking entities, Mauritius Commercial Bank Ltd and Standard Bank, in the name of Union Commercial Bank. The bank is a fully licensed commercial bank in Madagascar, which by 2007 had established branches in Antananarivo (Antsahavola, Ankonrondrano, Ankadimbahoaka, Ambohibao), Taomasina, and Mahajanga. In 2007, the bank changed its name to Mauritius Commercial Bank (Madagascar) SA.

== Ownership ==
The original shareholders were Mauritius Commercial Bank (70%), Standard Bank South Africa (10%), BFCOI (10%), FIARO (5%) and Société Manofi (5%). See table below: Currently, the shareholding may differ from the original ratios in 1992.

MCB Madagascar SA stock ownership
Rank	Name of owner	Percentage ownership
1	MCB Group	80
2	Banque Française Commerciale Océan Indien	10
3	FIARO	5
4	Société Manofi	5
	Total	100

== See also ==
- Mauritius Commercial Bank Ltd
- MCB Group
- List of banks in Madagascar
