= Banque Franco-Japonaise =

Former French bank

The Banque Franco-Japonaise (BFJ) (Japanese: 日仏銀行, Hepburn: Nichi-Futsu Ginkō, lit. 'French-Japanese Bank') was a mid-sized bank headquartered in Paris, France. It was founded in 1912 with intent to pursue common projects with Japanese stakeholders in Asia, especially in China. Its Japanese activities were liquidated in 1945, whereas the French entity, renamed Crédit Parisien in 1954, eventually formed the kernel of the banking subsidiary of Axa.

== Foundation and early activity ==
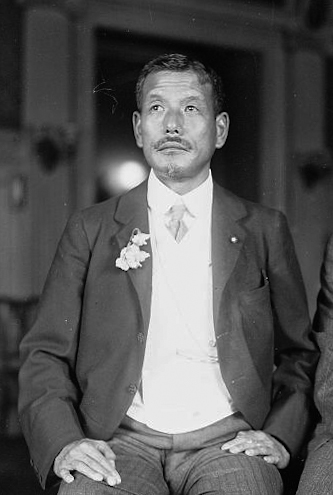
Soyeda Juichi (1864–1929) was instrumental in the BFJ's establishment

The BFJ was established on 1 July 1912 on the initiative of Société Générale. Its initial capital of 25 million French francs was split between Société Générale and the Banque de Paris et des Pays-Bas on the one hand (60 percent), and the Industrial Bank of Japan on the other hand (40 percent). It listed on the Paris Stock Exchange on 13 March 1914.

The BFJ's initial chairman was Henri Guernaut, member of the board of Société Générale and its future chairman as well. René Dorizon, himself the son of Société Générale Director Louis Dorizon, had been instrumental in the BFJ's creation and was its first chief executive (French: directeur général). Soeda Juichi was one of the bank's promoters on the Japanese side. It arranged a first yen loan to France in November 1915, reflecting the rapid rise of Japan's role as an international creditor during World War I.

The bank was initially established at 132, rue Réaumur in Paris, in a building originally erected in 1901 for the short-lived Banque Spéciale des Valeurs Industrielles. The BFJ then relocated and was at 34, rue de Chateaudun by 1918, and eventually at 33, rue Cambon by 1929, where the bank would remain until at least 1974. By the late 1930s, it had branches in Tokyo and Kobe.

== World War II ==
US SCAP decision directing the Bank of Japan to liquidate several banks associated with Japanese war operations including the BFJ, October 1945

During World War II, the BFJ was associated with the Vichy Government and by the end of the war was one of only two foreign banks that retained activities in Japan, the other being Deutsche Bank für Ostasien, which had been established during the war to facilitate trade with Nazi Germany. In October 1945, Supreme Commander for the Allied Powers Douglas MacArthur mandated the liquidation of the BFJ's Japanese branches together with those of the Bank of Chōsen, Bank of Taiwan, Chōsen Industrial Bank, and Deutsche Bank für Ostasien.

== Postwar developments ==
The BJF retained its banking activity in France. By 1951, it was controlled by Jean de Gunzburg (1884–1959) of the Gunzburg family, who had already been among the bank's board members during the 1920s. It was involved in gold trades with the Soviet Union via offshore financial centers such as Beirut and Tangier. Having no activities left in Japan, its name was changed to Crédit Parisien. It became a subsidiary of La Paternelle, an insurance group founded in 1843.

In 1975 Assurances du Groupe de Paris (AGP), a major private-sector insurer, acquired ownership of La Paternelle through a complex stock transaction. In 1977, the Compagnie du Midi financial group acquired AGP; in 1989 Axa in turn acquired Compagnie du Midi, and with it the Crédit Parisien. The latter was renamed as AXA Banque in the early 1990s.

== Gallery ==
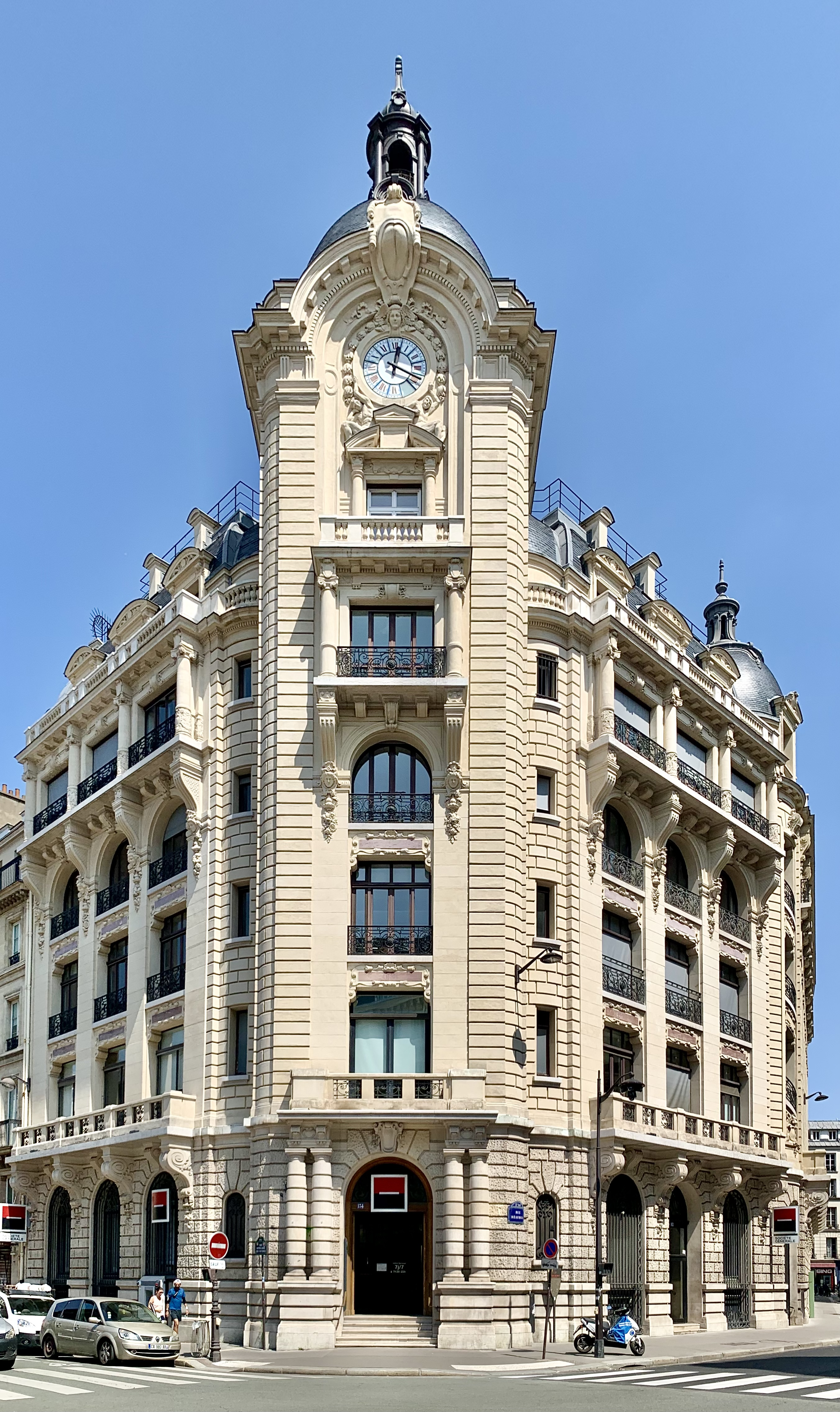
Building at 132-134, rue Réaumur in Paris, the BFJ's first head office

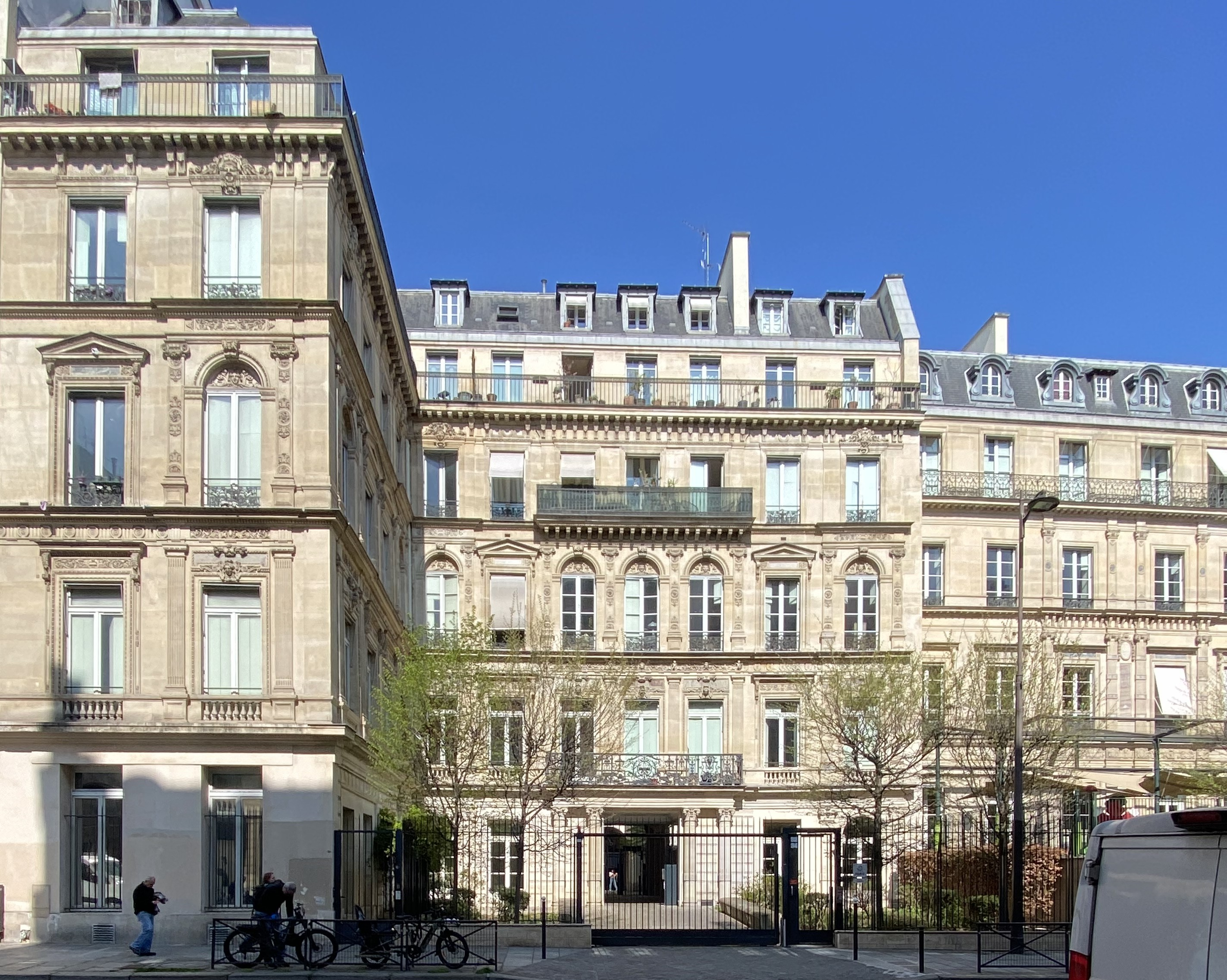
Building at 34, rue de Chateaudun in Paris, BFJ head office in the 1910s and 1920s

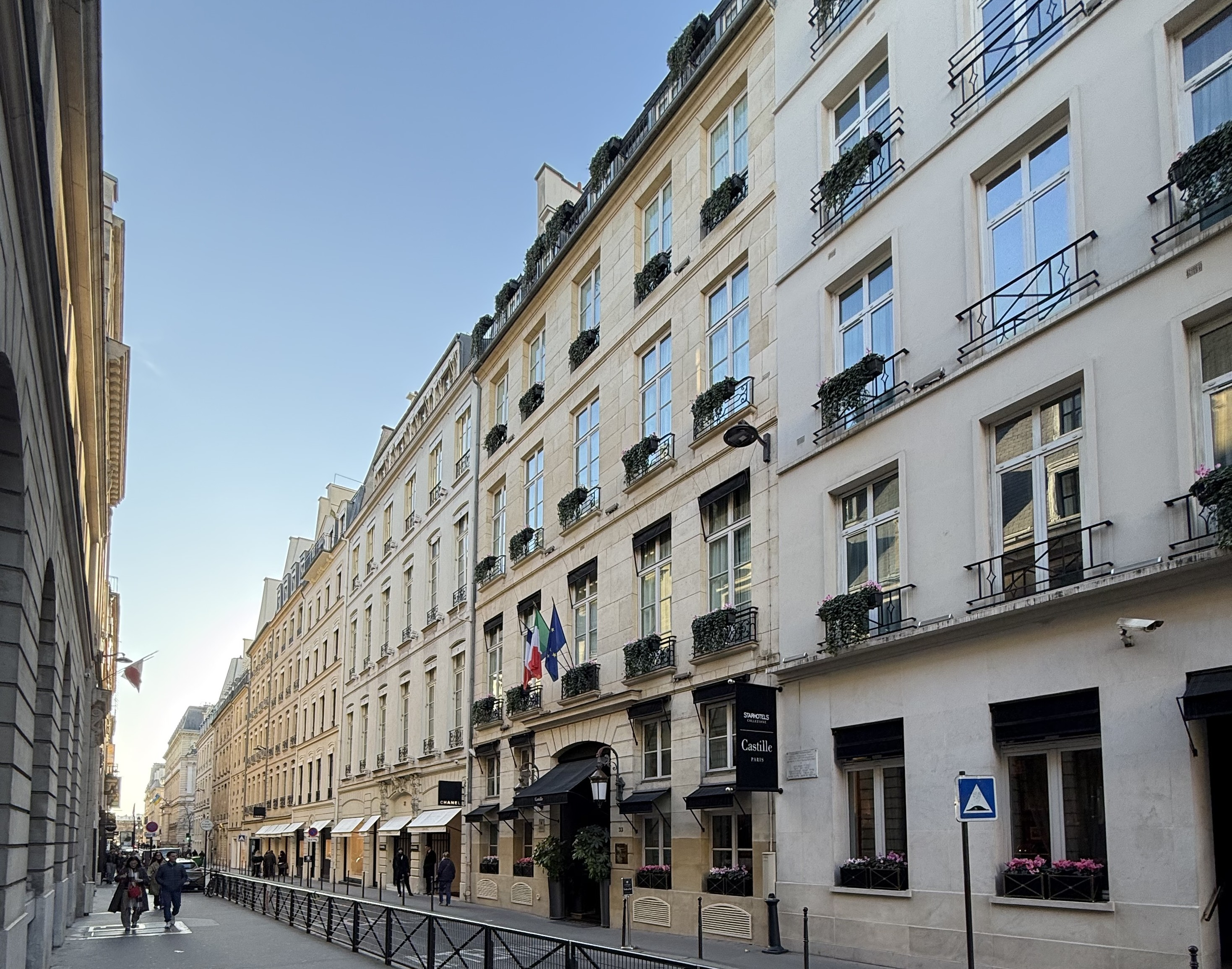
Building at 33, rue Cambon (center), BFJ /Crédit Parisien head office from the late 1920s to (at least) the 1970s

== See also ==
- Banque Franco-Chinoise
- Banque Franco-Serbe
- List of banks in France
