= Nguyễn Thái Bình =

Nguyễn Thái Bình (January 14, 1948 – July 2, 1972) was a Vietnamese anti-war student shot dead at Tan Son Nhat Airport after being accused of threatening to blow up the Pan Am Flight 841 in order to divert the flight to Hanoi. After his death, he became a symbol of the student anti-war movement in South Vietnam during the 1970s.

In Vietnam today, Nguyễn Thái Bình is regarded by state media as a symbol of the struggle against the United States. Several schools and a scholarship fund for high-achieving, underprivileged students bear his name. In Ho Chi Minh City, his name has been given to two streets–one in the former District 1 in the Financial District, Saigon and another in the former Tân Bình District, near the Tân Bình Gymnasium–as well as secondary and high schools in the former Bình Chánh and Tân Bình districts. In Đồng Hới (Quảng Bình Province), a street in Nam Lý ward is named after him (connecting Hoàng Việt Street and Võ Thị Sáu Street). In Hạ Long, a street in Hồng Hà ward bears his name. The primary school he attended in Cần Giuộc district (Long An Province) was renamed as Nguyễn Thái Bình Primary School. In Cà Mau, there is a secondary school named Nguyễn Thái Bình Secondary School. In Pleiku, a street in Ia Kring ward bears his name.

During period of 1988 to 2025, Ho Chi Minh City also had a ward named after him–Nguyễn Thái Bình ward in District 1–which has since become part of the current Saigon and Bến Thành wards.
