= Pan Am Flight 841 =

1972 airliner hijacking

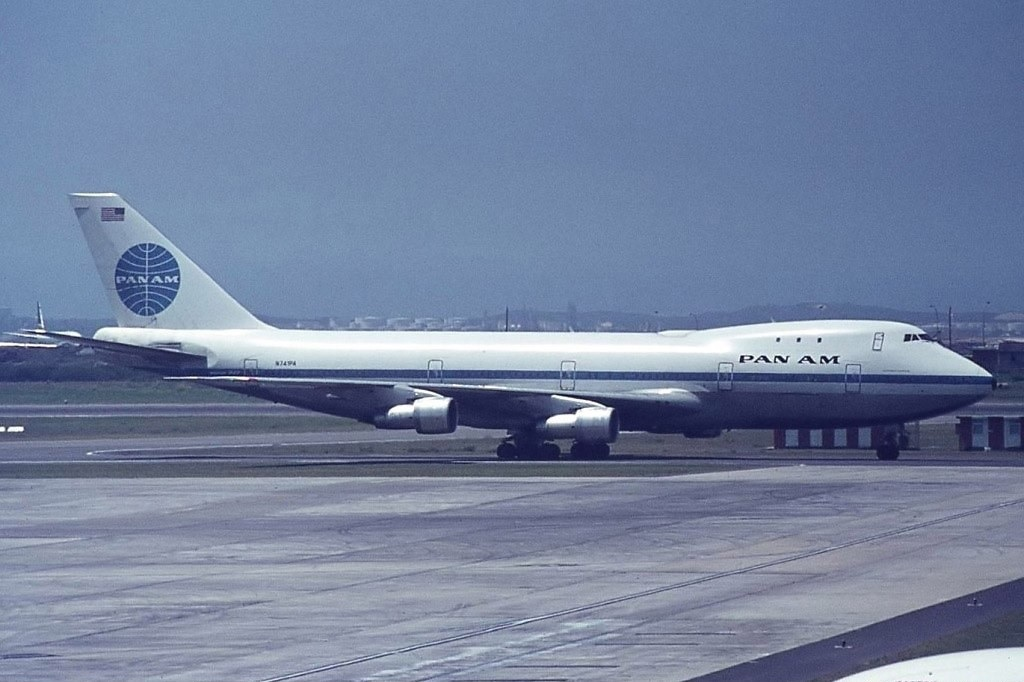
- N741PA, the aircraft involved in the hijacking, in 1970

Hijacking
- Date: 2 July 1972; 54 years ago
- Summary: Hijacking
- Site: Tan Son Nhut Air Base

Aircraft
- Aircraft type: Boeing 747-121
- Aircraft name: Clipper Kit Carson
- Operator: Pan American World Airways
- Call sign: CLIPPER 841
- Registration: N741PA
- Flight origin: San Francisco International Airport
- 1st stopover: Honolulu International Airport
- 2nd stopover: Guam International Airport
- Last stopover: Manila International Airport
- Destination: Tan Son Nhut Air Base
- Occupants: 152
- Passengers: 136
- Crew: 17
- Fatalities: 1 (hijacker)
- Survivors: 152

Pan Am Flight 841 was a commercial passenger flight of a Boeing 747 from San Francisco, California to Saigon, South Vietnam which was hijacked over the South China Sea on July 2, 1972, ostensibly as an act of protest concerning United States involvement in the Vietnam War as well as the expulsion from the U.S. of the South Vietnamese hijacker, a recent graduate of a U.S. university. The hijacking ended when the captain and passengers overcame and killed the lone hijacker after the plane landed at Tan Son Nhut Airport in Saigon.

== Flight ==
PA841 was a scheduled Pan Am commercial passenger flight, on a Boeing 747, registered as N741PA, which departed from San Francisco on July 2, 1972 destined for Saigon with stops at Honolulu, Guam and Manila.

About 45 minutes after the plane departed Manila with 153 passengers and crew aboard for the final leg of its trip to Saigon, a 24-year-old South Vietnamese native, Nguyễn Thái Bình, passed a note to a flight attendant that stated in English, "You are going to fly me to Hanoi and this airplane will be destroyed when we get there." Bình, (Note: Vietnamese are politely referred to by their given names (family names are first in the Vietnamese name structure, not given names). See Vietnamese name.) who claimed to be North Vietnamese, also took another flight attendant hostage. The note was conveyed to the flight's 53-year-old captain, Eugene Vaughn. Bình had graduated from the University of Washington on June 10, 1972 with a bachelor's degree in fisheries management after attending from 1968 to 1971 on a USAID scholarship. An activist opposed to U.S. involvement in the Vietnam War, Bình had been arrested for occupying the South Vietnamese consulate in New York; his visa was revoked on 7 June and he was expelled from the United States. Bình, who boarded the flight in Honolulu, ostensibly decided to hijack his flight home as an "act of revenge".

When Vaughn refused to reroute the flight from Saigon to Hanoi, Bình wrote a second note spattered with his own blood. The second note read "This indicates how serious I am about being taken to Hanoi." Vaughn confronted Bình in the cabin and observed a foil-wrapped package that Bình said contained a bomb. Bình was also armed with a long knife. Vaughn also spoke with another passenger on the flight, W.H. Mills, whom he knew to be a retired San Francisco police officer, advising him that he might require his assistance to overcome the hijacker and returning the officer's Smith & Wesson .357 Magnum revolver that had been stored in the cockpit for safekeeping during the flight.

Vaughn landed at Saigon's Tan Son Nhut Airport under the pretext of needing to refuel the aircraft. After landing, Vaughn walked back to the cabin to speak with the hijacker again. Bình, highly agitated, threatened to detonate his bomb unless the aircraft immediately departed for Hanoi. Claiming to have trouble understanding Bình's speech, Vaughn encouraged Bình to lean closer. When he did so, Vaughn restrained Bình in a choke hold and he and two passengers knocked the package from Bình's hand and pinned him to the floor. Vaughn signalled Mills, who shot Bình five times, killing him. Vaughn then carried Bình's body to the rear exit of the aircraft and threw it onto the tarmac. The 135 surviving passengers and 17 crew members evacuated the aircraft. The only reported injury other than the death of the hijacker was that of a U.S. Air Force Lieutenant Colonel, a passenger on the flight, who broke his leg exiting via the inflated evacuation chute. The plane took off hours later for Hong Kong to have its evacuation gear repaired.

== Aftermath ==
Vaughn reported that he had guessed (correctly) that Bình was bluffing. The foil-wrapped package actually contained lemons.

Many U.S. anti-war protesters viewed Bình as a martyr for their cause, and shortly after the incident a break-in occurred at Vaughn's home in Scottsdale, Arizona, with "animal intestines, paint and broken bottles" thrown into his swimming pool. The protesters also left a note, apparently written in animal blood: "Pig Eugene Vaughn guilty of murder. To be punished later. Long live Nguyễn Thái Bình. Victory to the Vietnamese. Death to the American aggressor." However, Vaughn was also lauded as a hero who acted to save his passengers, craft and crew, and his actions were described as an expression of frustration with the many hijackings that occurred during the period. Vaughn was quoted as saying, at an event to honor him at the Phoenix airport on his return to the United States, "A lot of time and effort has been spent on trying to prevent hijackings, but the only thing that will be effective is a mandatory death penalty, without any loopholes." Vaughn retired from Pan Am in 1979 after 38 years with the airline, and died of cancer in 1984; one of his sons and his daughter became airline pilots.

Bình's friends in the US established a collection in 1974 at the University of Washington library, containing papers about Bình's life and protest activities. Among those involved in establishing the collection were noted clergyman and peace activist William Sloane Coffin and academic and author Bruce E. Johansen. A street is named for Bình in present-day Ho Chi Minh City, honoring him as a hero of the 1970s anti-colonial movement in Vietnam.
