= Banque Française Commerciale Océan Indien =

Banque Française Commerciale Océan Indien (BFCOI) is a French bank that since 2003 has been jointly owned by Mauritius Commercial Bank and Société Générale. It has its headquarters in Saint Denis, Réunion. It has more than 360 employees and more than 80 000 clients in its operations in Réunion (13 branches), Mayotte (three branches), and Paris (one branch), which primarily engages in private banking.

== History ==
In 1984, the Banque Française Commerciale (BFC; the former Franco-Chinese Bank) restructured itself as a holding company. It established three legally and operationally distinct companies: Banque Française Commerciale en France Métropolitaine (BFC), with branches in France; BFCOI, with branches in Reunion, Mayotte and the Seychelles; and Banque Française Commerciale Antilles-Guyane (BFCAG), with branches in French Guiana and the Antilles. Banque Indosuez owned the entire share capital of all three entities.

Banque Indosuez sold a majority position (66.66%) in BFCOI to Mauritius Commercial Bank (MCB) in 1996; Banque Indosuez retained 22.22%. The next year, BFCOI opened a branch in Paris. In 1997, BFCOI opened a representative office in Mozambique.

In 2000, MCB acquired the minority stake Crédit Agricole Indosuez held in BFCOI, increasing its stake to 88.88%. This followed the takeover of Banque Indosuez by the Crédit Agricole Group, which itself had operations in both Reunion and Mayotte in direct competition with BFCOI. BFCOI became the representative of Banque française mutualiste in the Indian Ocean region.

== Joint venture ==
In early 2003, the Bank finalized an agreement with Société Générale, establishing joint (50:50) ownership of BFCOI. However, BFCOI's Seychelles operations fell outside the scope of the agreement. Instead, MCB incorporated a new fully owned subsidiary, The Mauritius Commercial Bank (Seychelles), trading under the name of MCB Seychelles, to take over the assets and liabilities of the Seychelles-based banking network of BFCOI.
