= Mekong Housing Bank =

Vietnamese state-owned commercial bank

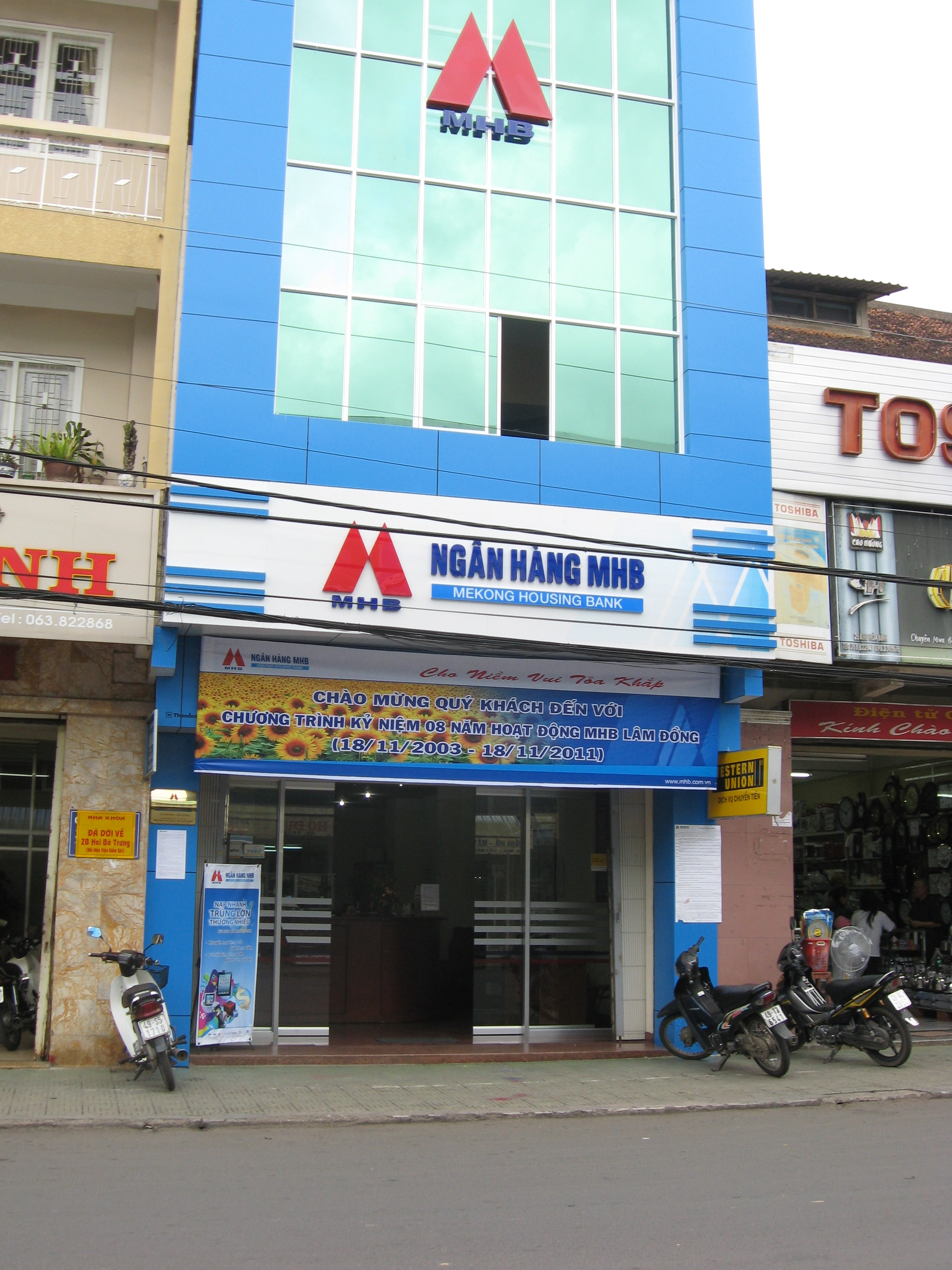
- Industry: Banking
- Founded: 1997
- Fate: Merged with BIDV Bank
- Headquarters: Ho Chi Minh City
- Area served: Vietnam
- Key people: Huỳnh Nam Dũng (chairman); Nguyễn Phước Hòa (director)
- Net income: 126 bn VND (2015)
- Total assets: 45,000 bn VND (2015)
- Owner: State Bank of Vietnam

The Housing Development Bank of Mekong Delta or Mekong Housing Bank (MHB) (Vietnamese: Ngân hàng Phát triển Nhà Đồng Bằng Sông Cửu Long) was a Vietnamese commercial bank operated from 1997 to 2015. At its peak, the bank employed more than 5,000 employees and had 44 branches and 187 sub-branches.

In 2015, the bank merged with Bank for Investment and Development of Vietnam (BIDV), ending its operation.
