= Mauritius Commercial Bank =

Mauritian commercial bank

The Mauritius Commercial Bank Ltd
- Type: Subsidiary
- Industry: Banking
- Founded: 1 September 1838; 188 years ago
- Founder: James Blyth
- Headquarters: 9–15 Sir William Newton Street, Port Louis, Mauritius
- Area served: Mauritius, Sub-Saharan Africa
- Key people: Simon Walker (Chairperson); Thierry Hebraud (CEO)
- Products: Retail banking, corporate banking, private banking, trade finance, project finance
- Operating income: ▲ Rs 42.2 billion (FY2026)
- Net income: ▲ Rs 18.5 billion (FY2026)
- Total assets: ▲ Rs 1.19 trillion (FY2026)
- Total equity: ▲ Rs 110.4 billion (FY2026)
- Number of employees: c. 4,100 (2025)
- Parent: MCB Group (through MCB Investment Holding Ltd)
- Website: mcb.mu

The Mauritius Commercial Bank Ltd (MCB) is a Mauritian commercial bank headquartered in Port Louis. Founded in 1838, it is the oldest bank in Mauritius and the largest: in 2025 Moody's put its share of onshore deposits at about 49%. It is licensed and regulated by the Bank of Mauritius, which has designated it a domestic systemically important bank every year since it first published such a list in 2014.

Since a restructuring in 2014 MCB has been a wholly owned subsidiary of the listed holding company MCB Group, which holds the group's other banks and non-banking businesses. Besides retail and corporate banking in Mauritius, the bank finances energy, commodities and infrastructure across Africa. In 2025/26 international corporate, institutional and private banking provided 57% of its operating income. That year the bank reported profit after tax of Rs 18.5 billion and total assets of Rs 1.19 trillion. Moody's rates its deposits Baa3. It has about 1.2 million customers in Mauritius.

== History ==
=== Foundation and early years ===
The bank was founded by a group of Port Louis merchants and traders led by James Blyth and William Hollier Griffiths. They wanted an alternative to the island's existing bank, the Bank of Mauritius (unrelated to the present central bank), which they considered to favour the island's planters. La Banque Commerciale de Maurice opened on 1 September 1838 in rue de Paris (now Sir Seewoosagur Ramgoolam Street). In 1839 Queen Victoria granted it a royal charter for twenty years. The charter was renewed every twenty years until 18 August 1955, when the bank became a limited liability company. Its 2026 financial statements date the charter to 1838.

The bank opened its first branch outside Port Louis, in Curepipe, in 1920. After the conversion to a limited company it expanded into rural areas, with branches at Mahébourg (1955), Flacq (1958), Triolet (1959) and Goodlands (1963). In 1960 it moved its head office to Sir William Newton Street (then rue de l'Église), where it remains. Its shares were listed on the Stock Exchange of Mauritius (SEM) in 1989.

=== Regional expansion (1990s–2008) ===
Between 1991 and 1999 MCB expanded into the other islands of the south-west Indian Ocean and into Mozambique. In 1992 it acquired Banque Française Commerciale Océan Indien (BFCOI), which had branches in Réunion, Mayotte, the Seychelles and Paris. The same year it founded Union Commercial Bank in Antananarivo, with Standard Bank and BFCOI as minority shareholders; the bank was renamed MCB Madagascar in 2007. In August 1999 MCB began operations in Maputo through a new subsidiary, União Comercial de Bancos (Moçambique), later MCB Moçambique.

In 2003 MCB and Société Générale agreed to share ownership of BFCOI equally, with Société Générale taking over its management. BFCOI's Seychelles operations were excluded from the deal and continued as a separate MCB subsidiary, MCB (Seychelles). In 2008 MCB opened a branch in Malé, the capital of the Maldives, inaugurated by President Maumoon Abdul Gayoom on 4 May; he described it as bringing MCB's presence to seven countries. The same year South Africa's Registrar of Banks approved an MCB representative office in Johannesburg.

=== National Pensions Fund fraud ===
In 2003 it emerged that a retired MCB manager had diverted about Rs 600 million deposited with the bank by the National Pensions Fund and the National Savings Fund; MCB repaid the funds Rs 881.6 million, and in 2017 the bank itself was convicted of failing to keep adequate anti-money-laundering controls, a conviction upheld on appeal in 2025 with the fine reduced to Rs 1.2 million.

=== Group restructuring (2013–2014) ===
Until 2014 MCB was both a licensed bank and the holding company of the group's other businesses. Under a scheme of arrangement that took effect on 21 February 2014, shareholders exchanged their MCB shares one-for-one for shares in a new holding company, MCB Group Ltd. MCB itself was placed under an intermediate company, MCB Investment Holding Ltd, which also took over the foreign banking subsidiaries. The non-banking subsidiaries were transferred to MCB Group. MCB's shares last traded on 24 March 2014, and MCB Group shares were listed on the SEM in their place in early April 2014. In October 2014 Moody's downgraded MCB, citing the new group structure.

=== Since 2015 ===
MCB has shifted towards international banking, especially structured finance for oil and gas traders and producers in Africa. By 2022 more than half of its balance sheet was outside Mauritius. Reuters reported exposures of about US$850 million in Nigeria, US$300 million in Ghana and US$200 million in Senegal and Ivory Coast. MCB opened representative offices in Nairobi in January 2019 and in the Dubai International Financial Centre in 2019, and announced an office in Lagos in 2022.

In 2019/20 the COVID-19 pandemic pushed the bank's net impairment charge up to Rs 4.8 billion, from Rs 1.5 billion the year before. Of this, Rs 3.3 billion was provisions against loans that were still performing, and profit after tax fell 15.5% to Rs 7.4 billion. Profit has risen every year since, and in 2025/26 total assets passed Rs 1 trillion for the first time.

In October 2022 MCB registered a US$3 billion Global Medium Term Note programme on the London Stock Exchange's International Securities Market. Its first issue, US$300 million of five-year notes, followed in April 2023, and a second, US$400 million of notes due 2031, in April 2026. The bank also raised a US$350 million syndicated loan from Asian banks in February 2025 and a US$450 million loan, mostly from Gulf and Indian lenders, in February 2026.

Alain Law Min was chief executive from April 2017 until he retired at the end of 2023. He was succeeded by Thierry Hebraud, previously head of corporate and investment banking.

== Business ==
MCB reports two segments. Home Markets covers banking in Mauritius. Corporate and Institutional Banking and Private Banking (CIBPB) covers international corporate lending and wealth management. In 2025/26 Home Markets provided 43% of operating income and CIBPB 57%. Internally the bank is organised into Retail, Business Banking, Private Wealth Management, and Corporate and Institutional Banking.

=== Retail and business banking ===
For individuals, MCB offers:

- current, savings and multi-currency accounts;
- home, personal, education and car loans, including "green" loans and leases;
- debit, credit and prepaid cards.

It issues Visa, Mastercard and American Express cards and acquires card payments for merchants, including American Express transactions in Mauritius. About 17,000 merchants accept digital payments through MCB.

For businesses, the bank provides:

- working-capital and investment loans;
- leasing;
- trade finance (letters of credit, guarantees and supply-chain finance);
- foreign exchange and hedging;
- an online business-to-business marketplace, punch.mu.

=== Digital banking ===
MCB's mobile banking and payment app, Juice, was launched in 2013 with the Singapore software company Tagit. It supports transfers and QR-code payments through MauCAS, the national payment switch. Version 5.0 of the app, released in September 2025, added contactless (NFC) card payments. Small firms use a separate app, JuicePro, and companies use an internet-banking platform, IB Pro.

Juice subscribers (year to 30 June)
2020	2021	2022	2023	2024	2025
330,000+	397,600	427,800	521,172	604,185	679,189

=== Private banking, custody and markets ===
MCB Private Wealth offers wealth planning, discretionary portfolio management, Lombard lending and structured products to local and international clients. The bank also provides custody services. It holds more than 55% of local custody assets and was named Best Custodian in Sub-Saharan Africa at the 2025 Global Custodian awards. In 2024 it accounted for about 45% of domestic foreign-exchange trading.

=== Corporate and institutional banking ===
The international business is centred on Global Structured Finance, which lends to three sectors:

- energy (mainly oil and gas trading and production);
- metals and minerals;
- power and infrastructure.

It uses structured commodity trade finance, project finance, syndicated loans and sustainable finance. MCB has relationships with about 100 correspondent banks in Africa.

At 30 June 2026 about 54% of gross customer loans were to borrowers outside Mauritius. By sector, gross lending included:

- Rs 161 billion to oil and gas (about a third of the book);
- Rs 33 billion to power and infrastructure;
- Rs 9 billion to metals and minerals.

By currency, rupee loans were Rs 177 billion and US dollar loans Rs 253 billion.

=== Distribution and market position ===
MCB is the largest bank in Mauritius. In 2025 it held about half of rupee deposits, about 39% of credit to the economy and about 40% of the country's ATMs. Moody's put its share of onshore deposits at 49%.

Domestic network and customers (at 30 June)
Year	Employees	Branches and kiosks	ATMs	Customers
2020	2,900+	40	178	1,000,000+
2021	c. 3,000	41	182	–
2022	c. 3,100	39	179	c. 1,059,000
2023	c. 3,300	39	179	c. 1,090,600
2024	c. 3,500	39	181	c. 1,142,000
2025	c. 4,100	38	182	c. 1,197,600

Outside Mauritius the bank has representative offices in Paris, Johannesburg, Nairobi, Lagos and Dubai. Its sister banks in Madagascar, Seychelles and the Maldives, and the associate BFCOI in Réunion and Mayotte, are owned by MCB Group, not by MCB.

== Financial performance ==
Bank (separate) figures, Rs million, year to 30 June
Year	Operating income	Profit after tax	Net loans to customers	Customer deposits	Total assets	Total equity
2020	19,273	7,409	226,777	364,008	485,873	53,212
2021	19,743	7,396	256,750	453,828	625,541	63,296
2022	20,854	8,948	306,648	481,103	664,517	66,753
2023	28,118	12,959	329,650	547,586	761,612	75,394
2024	33,150	15,446	375,404	634,292	865,452	86,115
2025	37,757	17,211	366,970	681,527	923,585	95,562
2026	42,178	18,549	476,153	830,451	1,191,241	110,443

Key ratios (bank), %
Year	Capital adequacy	Tier 1	Cost-to-income	Gross NPL	Cost of risk	Return on equity
2020	17.5	16.5	32.5	3.8	1.87	14.6
2021	16.8	15.8	34.1	3.2	1.43	12.7
2022	17.2	16.3	35.2	3.4	0.91	13.8
2023	18.3	15.8	32.9	3.0	0.90	18.2
2024	19.8	17.3	33.6	2.8	0.79	19.1
2025	21.1	18.6	35.2	2.7	0.7	18.9
2026	19.5	17.3	36.1	1.7	0.4	–
Sources: annual reports 2021–2025 and FY2026 results. From 2025 the NPL ratio includes corporate notes.

In 2025/26 profit before tax rose 15.6% to Rs 25.1 billion, while profit after tax rose 7.8%, held back by new tax measures in Mauritius. Net interest income was Rs 27.9 billion and the net interest margin 2.96%. Net fee income was Rs 7.7 billion and trading income Rs 5.8 billion. Impairment charges fell 27.7%. Costs were pushed up partly by premiums for the new deposit insurance scheme. The auditor, Deloitte, gave an unmodified opinion. Deloitte has audited the bank since 2020/21; PricewaterhouseCoopers audited it before that.

== Capital, liquidity and funding ==
As a domestic systemically important bank, MCB must hold an extra capital buffer of 2.5% of risk-weighted assets, the highest rate applied by the Bank of Mauritius. With the capital conservation buffer, this sets its minimum ratios at 13% for Tier 1 capital and 15% for total capital. At 30 June 2025 its liquidity coverage ratio was 621% and its net stable funding ratio 163%. The liquidity coverage ratio was 380% at 31 March 2026.

Customer deposits were Rs 830 billion at 30 June 2026. Retail customers held Rs 388 billion of these and corporate customers Rs 443 billion. About 46% were in rupees, with the rest mainly in US dollars (Rs 357 billion) and euros (Rs 74 billion). The bank also raises money through syndicated loans and debt securities. Its outstanding securities at 30 June 2026 were:

Instrument	Amount	Coupon	Issued	Maturity	Notes
Senior unsecured notes (ISIN XS2614704893)	US$300 million	7.95%	April 2023	26 April 2028	Under the GMTN programme, listed on the LSE International Securities Market
Senior unsecured notes (ISIN XS3326338566)	US$400 million	6.15%	April 2026	16 April 2031	Under the GMTN programme; FMO and Proparco were cornerstone investors
Basel III Tier 2 subordinated loan	US$147 million	–	31 March 2023	30 March 2033	Private placement with the African Development Bank, amortising from year six

MCB pays dividends to its parent. It declared Rs 5.2 billion in 2023/24, Rs 7.1 billion in 2024/25 and Rs 3.5 billion in 2025/26.

== Credit ratings ==
Agency	Rating	Outlook	Notes
Moody's	Baa3 / P-3 (deposits)	Negative	Baseline credit assessment ba1. Affirmed February 2025, when the outlook was changed to negative after the same change for Mauritius's sovereign rating
CARE Ratings (Africa)	AAA (domestic)	Stable	Issuer rating for obligations in Mauritius

Moody's also rates the Global Medium Term Note programme Baa3. The Moody's rating includes one notch of uplift above the bank's standalone assessment, reflecting the likelihood of government support.

== Deposit protection ==
MCB is a member of the Mauritius Deposit Insurance Scheme, set up under the Mauritius Deposit Insurance Scheme Act 2019 and run by the Mauritius Deposit Insurance Corporation, a subsidiary of the Bank of Mauritius. Membership is compulsory for all licensed banks. The scheme protects deposits of resident individuals up to Rs 300,000 per depositor per bank. Corporate, non-resident and related-party deposits are not covered.

== Sustainability ==
MCB was a founding signatory of the United Nations Principles for Responsible Banking in September 2019, and adopted the Equator Principles in 2012. Its exclusion list rules out financing coal infrastructure, coal trading and new coal-fired power plants. It has borrowed credit lines for green and climate projects from the Agence française de développement (SUNREF), and US$120 million from Proparco and DEG. In July 2026 the bank raised its sustainable finance facility for Mauritian customers from Rs 10 billion to Rs 25 billion.

== Governance ==
MCB is wholly owned by MCB Investment Holding Ltd, which is itself owned by MCB Group. Simon Walker, an independent director since 2020, has chaired the board since December 2024. Thierry Hebraud has been chief executive since 1 January 2024. In June 2026 he was elected chairperson of the Mauritius Bankers Association. The company secretary is MCB Group Corporate Services Ltd. The bank's SWIFT code is MCBLMUMU.

== Recognition ==
The Banker has named MCB its Bank of the Year for Mauritius several times, including in 2015, 2016, 2017, 2022 and 2024. In 2024 it also named MCB African Bank of the Year, the first Mauritian bank to win the award. In 2025 MCB won the following awards:

- Euromoney Best Bank in Mauritius;
- African Banker Best Regional Bank – Southern Africa;
- Global Custodian Best Custodian in Sub-Saharan Africa.

== See also ==
- List of banks in Mauritius
- MCB Group
