= Diamond Plaza =

Complex building in Ho Chi Minh City, Vietnam

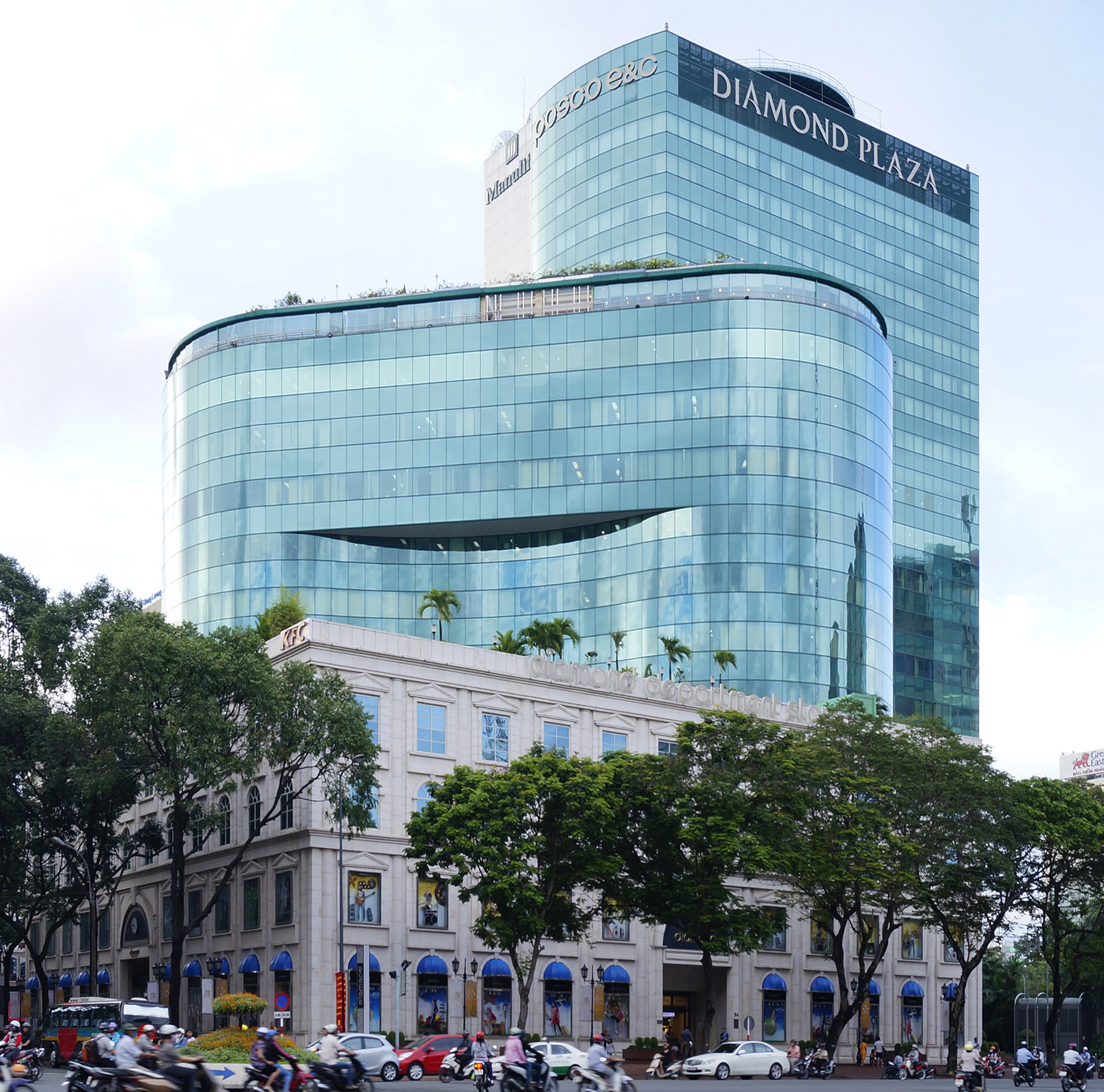
- Diamond Plaza in 2012

General information
- Architectural style: Postmodern & contemporary classical
- Location: 34 Lê Duẩn Boulevard – No. 2 Phạm Ngọc Thạch – No. 2 Nguyễn Văn Chiêm Street, Bến Nghé, Ho Chi Minh City, Vietnam
- Coordinates: 10.7808°N 106.6983°E
- Opening: May 1999; 27 years ago (Offices and apartment)
- Inaugurated: August 25, 2000; 26 years ago (Diamond Department Store)
- Cost: US$255 Million
- Owner: International Business Center Co., Ltd

Height
- Height: 90 m (300 ft)
- Top floor: 20

Technical details
- Floor count: 22 (included 2 basements)
- Floor area: 56,922 m^{2} (612,700 sq ft)

Design and construction
- Developer: POSCO & VNSteel

Other information
- Public transit: L3 L4 Youth Cultural House station (planned)

Website
- diamondplaza.com.vn

Diamond Plaza is a complex building in downtown Saigon, Ho Chi Minh City. The complex includes a 5-story building for department store, 14-story and 20-story towers are for offices with the latters last 6 floors are for serviced apartments, and 2 basement levels. The complex was completed and opened for office leasing and apartment in 1999 and a year later in 2000 for the shopping center.

The building is located next to the Youth Cultural House, April 30 Park, Saigon Notre-Dame Basilica and Saigon Central Post Office. South Korea's Posco Construction & Engineering and Vietnam's VNSteel did the construction for the building.

The 5-story New Classical architecture podium of shopping center including: a Lotte Department Store (initially Diamond Department Store), a Lotte Cinema Diamond Plaza theater, bowling, restaurants, café and a Family Medical Practice Vietnam. A helicopter pad on the rooftop of the building.

== History ==
=== Pre-1994: Etablissements Jean Comte ===
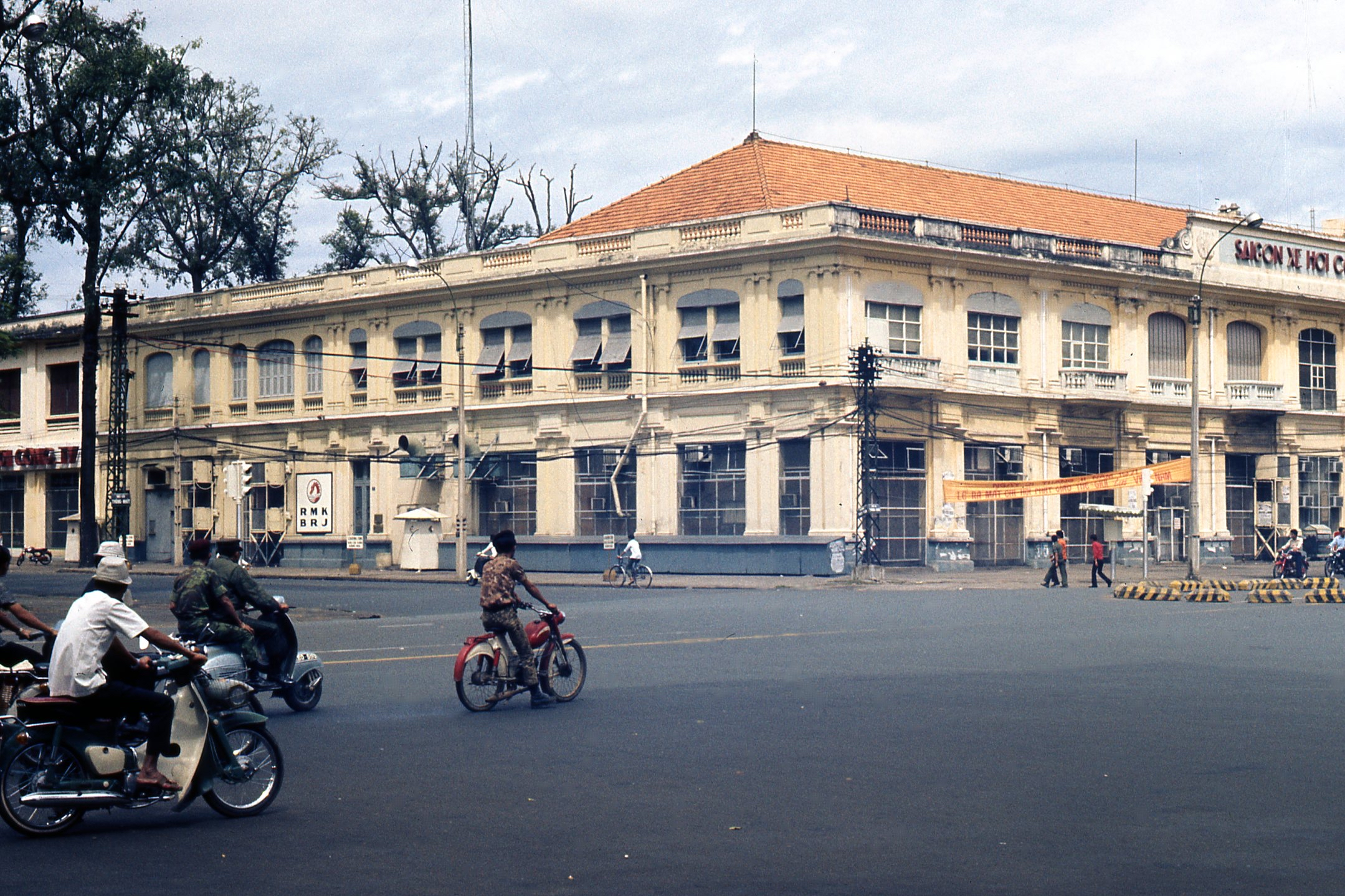
The Etablissements Jean Comte building with RMK-BMJ headquarters on Duy Tân Street and Saigon Car Company on Thống Nhứt Boulevard

Originally established in 1911 as Etablissements Jean Comte at 34 Norodom Boulevard (later Thống Nhứt Boulevard then now Lê Duẩn Boulevard), this iconic French-colonial building served as a prominent dealership for prestigious European automotive brands like Peugeot. In 1960, the facility transitioned into the Saigon Xe Hơi Công Ty (Saigon Car Company), becoming a vital manufacturing and assembly hub for Citroën in Vietnam. Between 1970 and 1975, the plant made historical strides by manufacturing the La Dalat, recognized as the first locally assembled, budget-friendly car tailored specifically for the Vietnamese market. Following the events of 1975, the automotive plant ceased operations.

In January 1962, the RMK group opened a temporary office at the Caravelle Hotel. As operations expanded, RMK partnered with the BRJ group in 1965 to form the RMK-BRJ joint venture (consisting of Raymond International, Morrison-Knudsen, Brown & Root, and J.A. Jones Construction). The resulting increase in activity made the temporary office space inadequate; consequently, a few months later, a new, permanent headquarters was opened at No. 2 Duy Tân Street (now Phạm Ngọc Thạch Street).

=== 1994–2014: Diamond Plaza initial phase ===
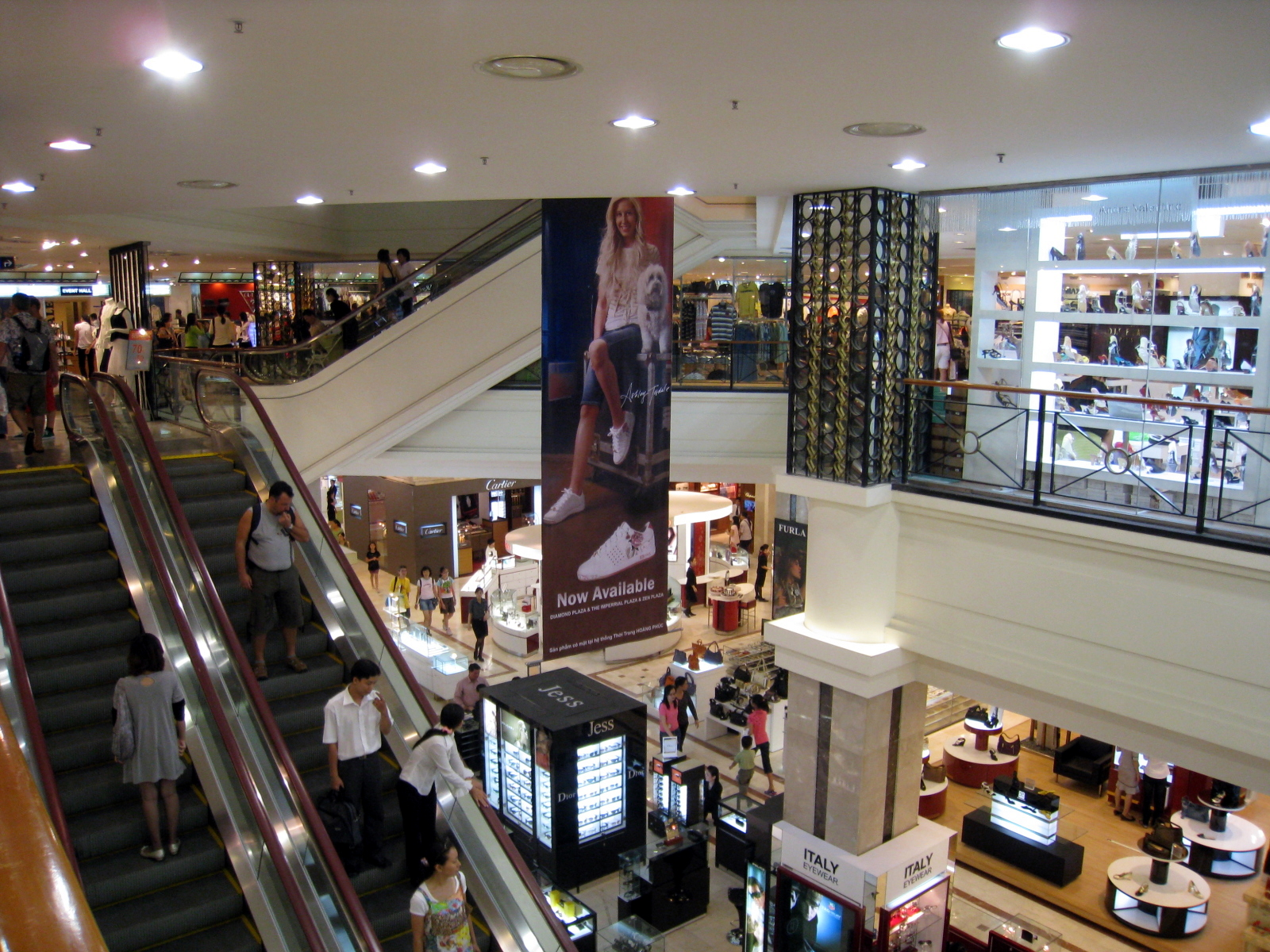
Diamond Department Store

Following the establishment of diplomatic relations between South Korea and Vietnam in 1992, and with government support driven by economic reform policies, the Diamond Plaza project took shape.

The International Business Center Co., Ltd. (IBC; Công ty liên doanh Trung tâm thương mại Quốc tế) was established as a joint venture with the equity structure at the time consisted of Vietnam Steel Corporation (VNSteel) holding a 40% stake and the South Korean construction firm POSCO Engineering & Construction (POSCO E&C) holding 60%. Upon its establishment in late 1994, the project had an initial charter capital of US$23 million. Under the original agreement and subsequent amendments, POSCO was obligated to gradually transfer shares to the Vietnamese partner.

Construction began in 1995 after demolishing the former building, the apartments and office space are leased on May 1999. On August 25, 2000, the department store in the base was officially opened and the whole Diamond Plaza complex is officially completed.

=== 2014–now: Lotte phase ===
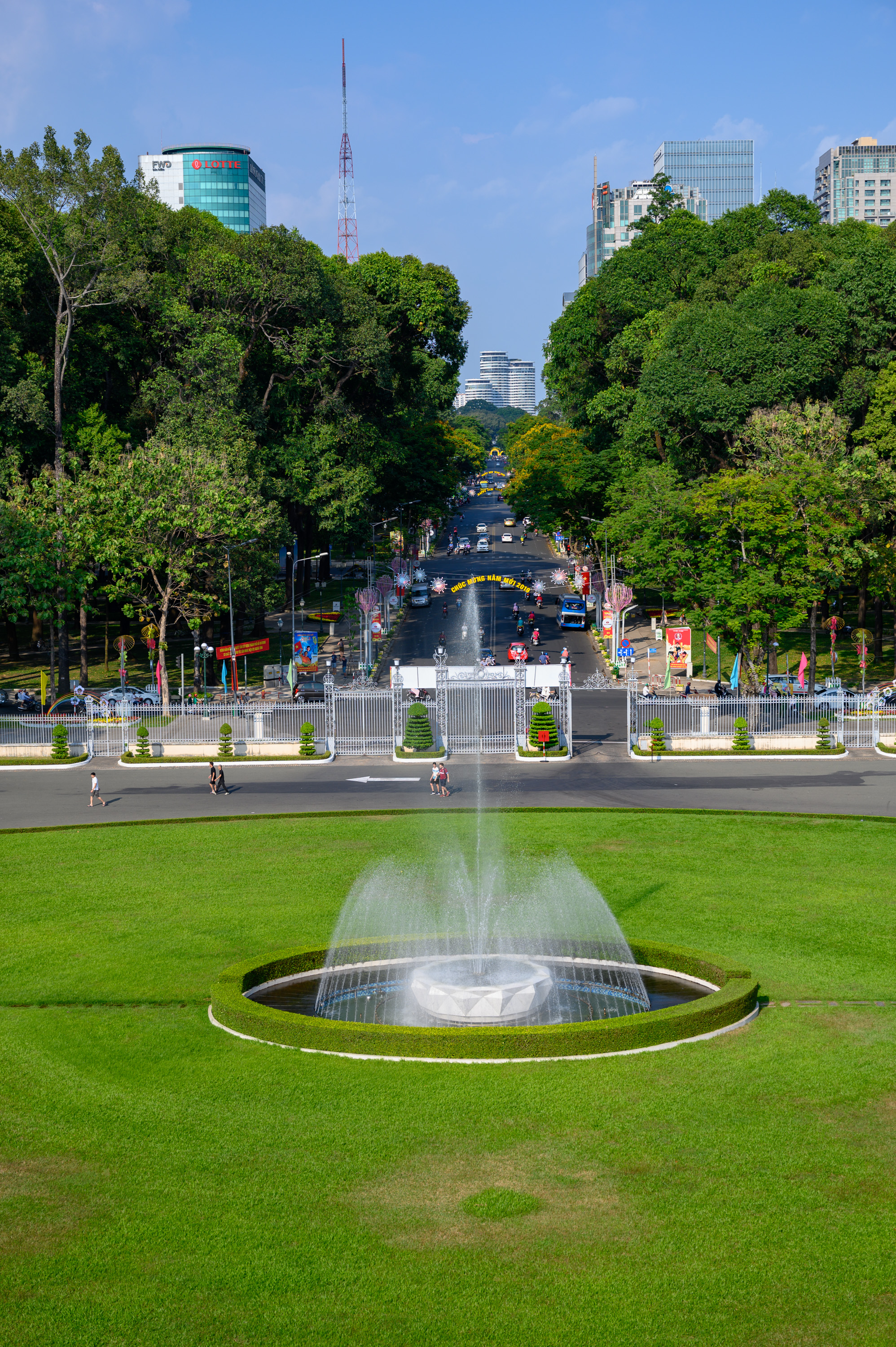
Diamond Plaza in 2019 seen from the balcony of the Independence Palace with Lotte logo replaced the former POSCO E&C

A major turning point occurred in late 2014 when Lotte Group (South Korea) officially acquired the majority of the capital from its fellow South Korean partner, POSCO, thereby securing operational control of the building starting in early 2015. In March 2015, Lotte Group announced the official acquisition of approximately 70% of the shares in Diamond Plaza from Posco E&C. The ownership structure was subsequently rebalanced: Lotte Shopping Holdings (Singapore) held a 50% stake, while VNSteel increased its ownership to 50% (comprising its original 40% holding plus a 10% stake transferred from POSCO). However, under the cooperation agreement signed at the time thr IBC was established as a joint venture, South Korea's Lotte Group is required to unconditionally return the project by 2043, even though it has acquired POSCO's 50% stake in the venture.

The building has its first restoration in 2023. Following its renovation, Diamond Plaza has welcomed 65 new brands, including many renowned international names making their debut in Vietnam.

== Overall ==
The project is a complex of three stacked buildings arranged in a stepped configuration, with the 4-story building is a New classical architecture, and the others are 14 and 20-story ones with the base are the Postmodern architectures. Outdoor ATMs and a kiosk of Highlands Coffee are located on Nguyễn Văn Chiêm Street, and a drop-off zone between the 14 and 20-story buildings with entrance on Lê Duẩn Boulevard and exit on Nguyễn Văn Chiêm Street.

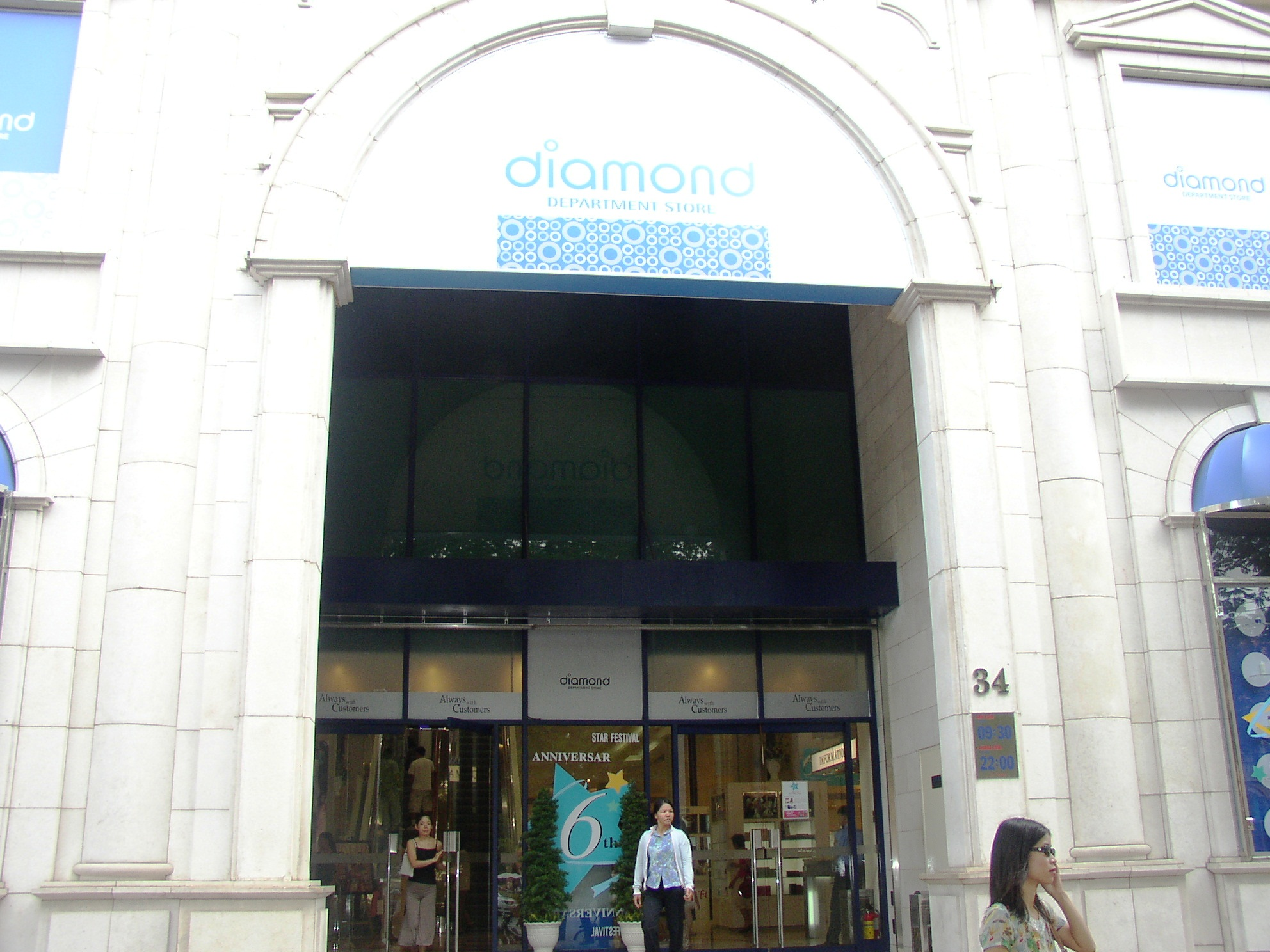
Entrance of Diamond Department Store

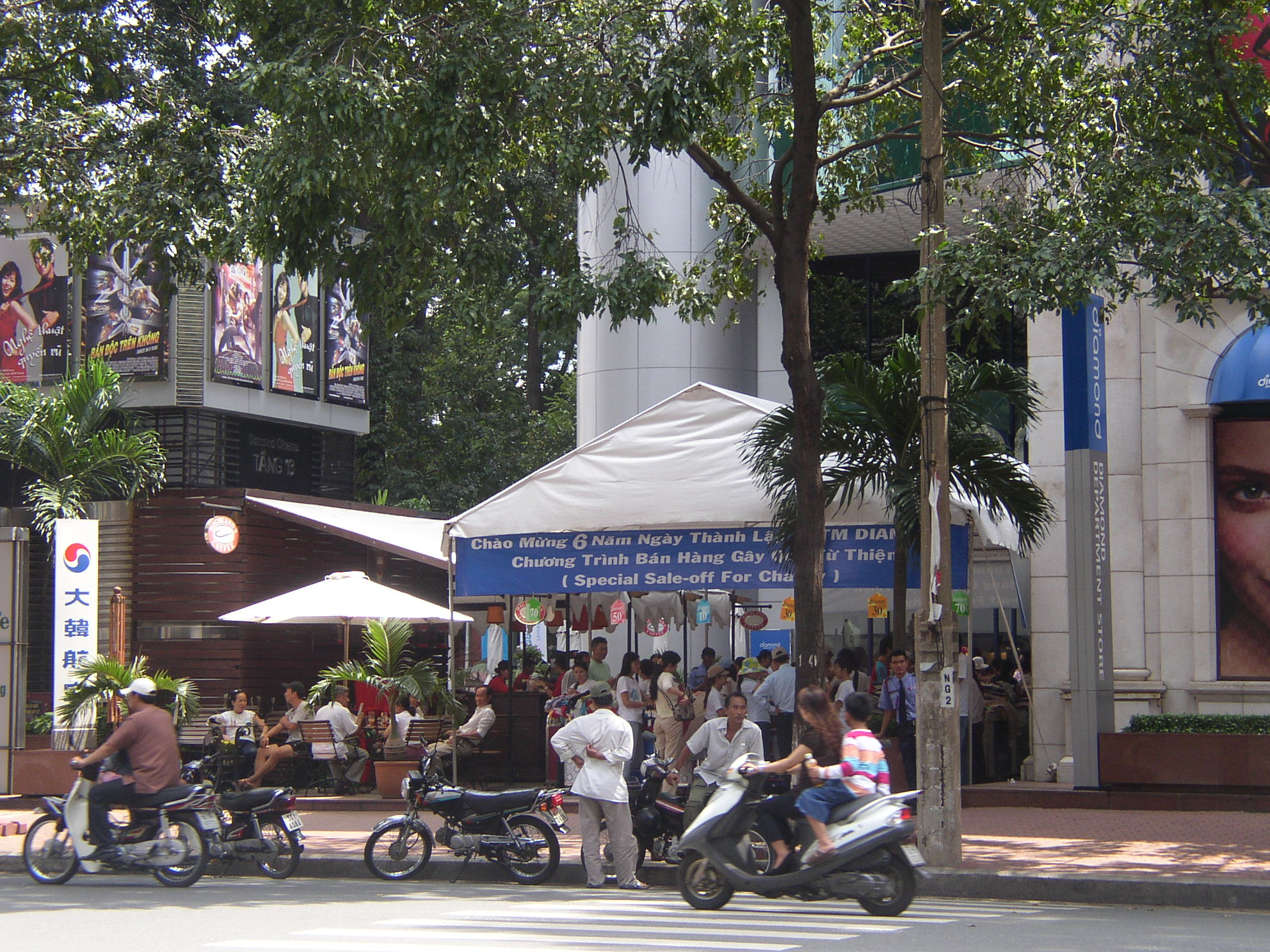
Highlands Coffee kiosk and Diamond Cinema screening schedule board

=== Floor plan ===
Tower	14-story	20-story
Level	Use	
15–20	–	Diamond Serviced apartments (Helipad on top)
14	Outdoor swimming pool, Barbecue	Fitness center
13	DHA Golfzon In-door Golf Lounge, Lotte Cinema Diamond Plaza	
6–12	Diamond Office Leasing	
5	Lotte Department Store, Family Medical Practice Vietnam	
4	Lotte Department Store, Family Medical Practice Vietnam	
3	Lotte Department Store, Family Medical Practice Vietnam	
2	Lotte Department Store, Family Medical Practice Vietnam	
1	Lotte Department Store, Family Medical Practice Vietnam	
B1–B2	Parking lot	
"–" denotes the tower doesn't have those levels

==== Notes: ====
- Family Medical Practice Vietnam Clinic is located at first floor of the 20-story building
- The American Center in Ho Chi Minh City is located at Level 8
- Some notable office tenants: Lotte Subsidiaries, Lotte Department Store, CJ CGV, Korean Air, Nonghyup Bank, Industrial Bank of Korea, KOTRA, Samsonite, FWD Group. Office leasing is also available at Level 13
- Lotte Cinema Diamond Plaza was called as Diamond Cinema
- The fitness center features sauna and relaxation rooms
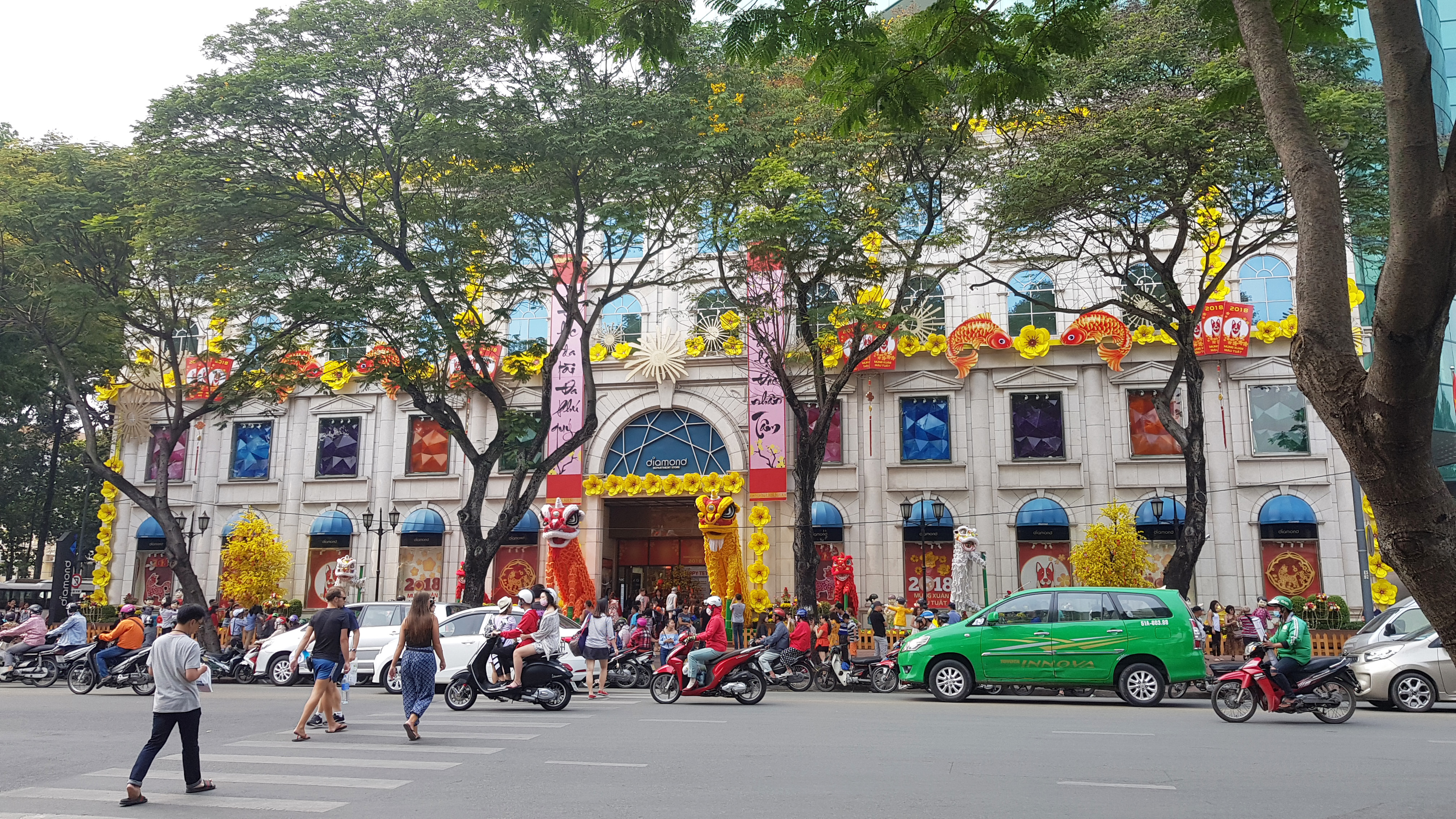
  Department store decorated for Tết

=== Seasonal decoration ===
Diamond Plaza is renowned for its spectacular festive decorations, particularly during the Lunar New Year and Christmas seasons. The building façade on Lê Duẩn Boulevard is the most popular spot for photos, as the decorative displays are set up openly in this area and are free to photograph.

== Department store ==
The department store of Diamond Plaza initially known as Diamond Department Store, with a approximately retail area of 15,000 square metres (160,000 sq ft). Since 2015, when Lotte bought the shares of POSCO, the department store is under Lotte Department Store and known as Lotte Department Store – Diamond Plaza. The store spans over the whole 4-story building in Contemporary classical style, also some first levels of the 14-story office building. The rooftop of the department store, marked as Level 5, serves as a terrace with restaurants, café here offering panoramic views of the city center, overlooking nearby landmarks such as Notre Dame Cathedral, Saigon Central Post Office and the Independence Palace, as well as iconic skyscrapers like the Bitexco Financial Tower, Vietcombank Tower, Saigon Centre, Landmark 81, etc.

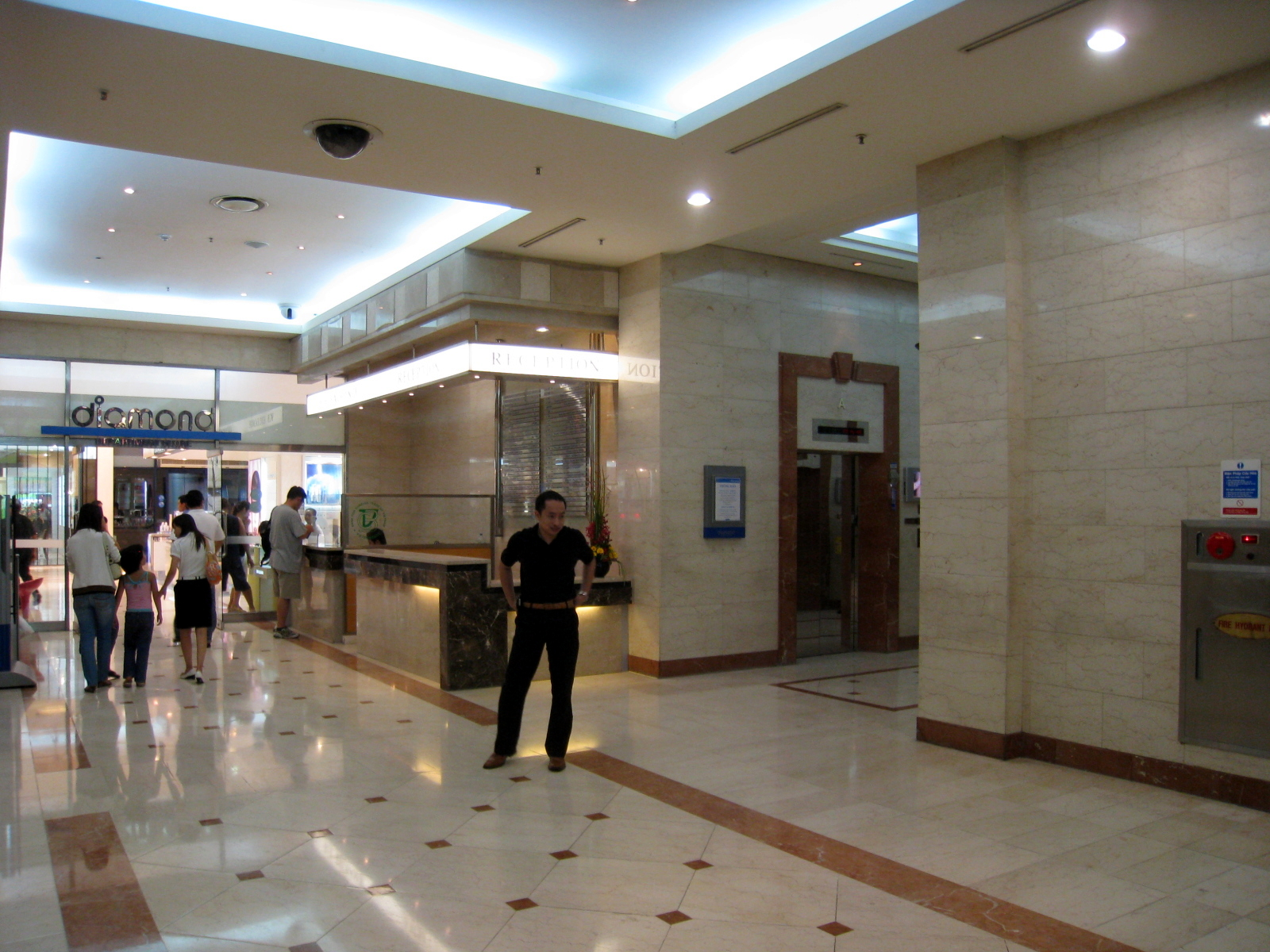
Diamond Plaza Office Lobby at Level 1

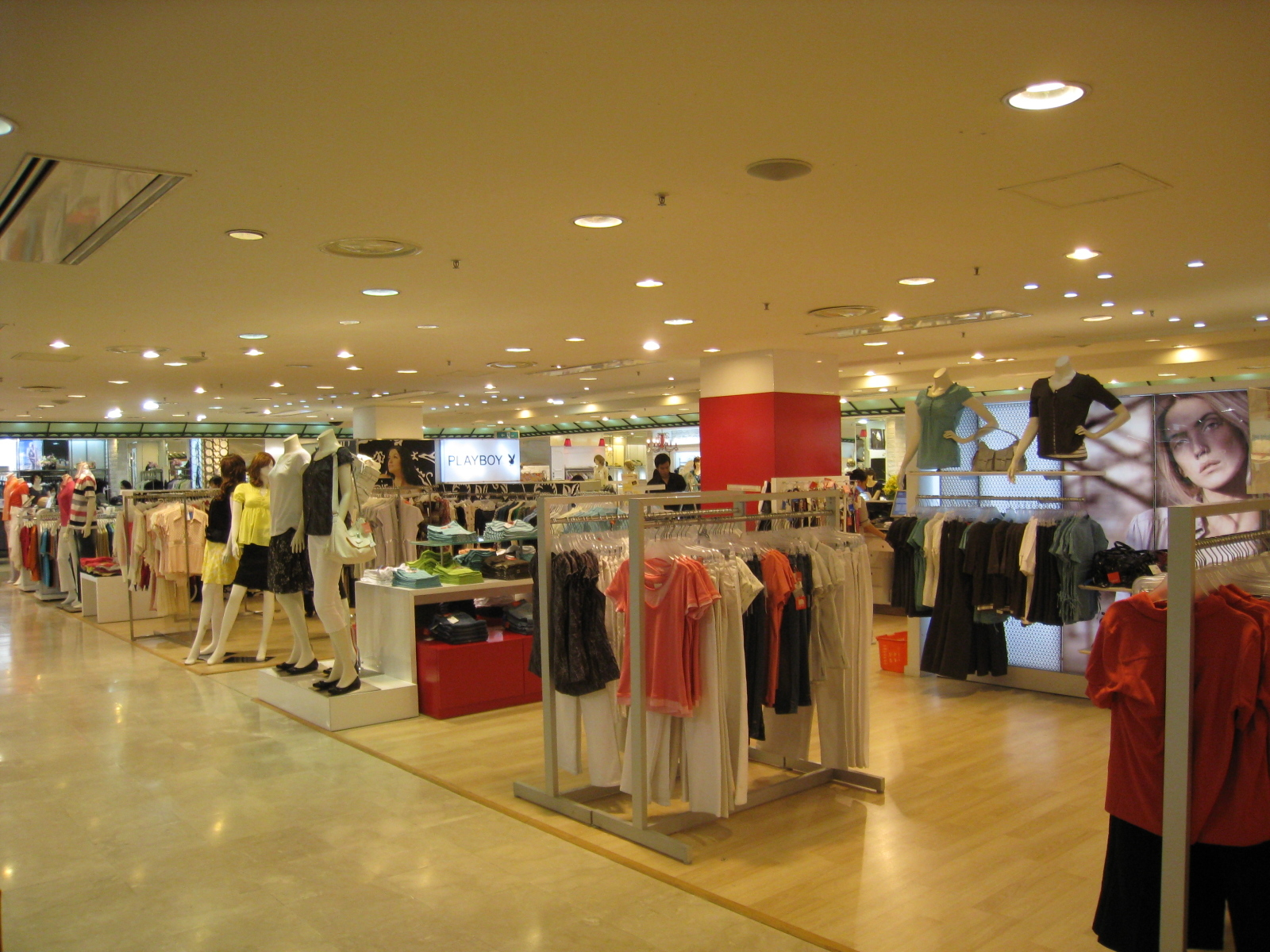
Diamond Plaza Level 2

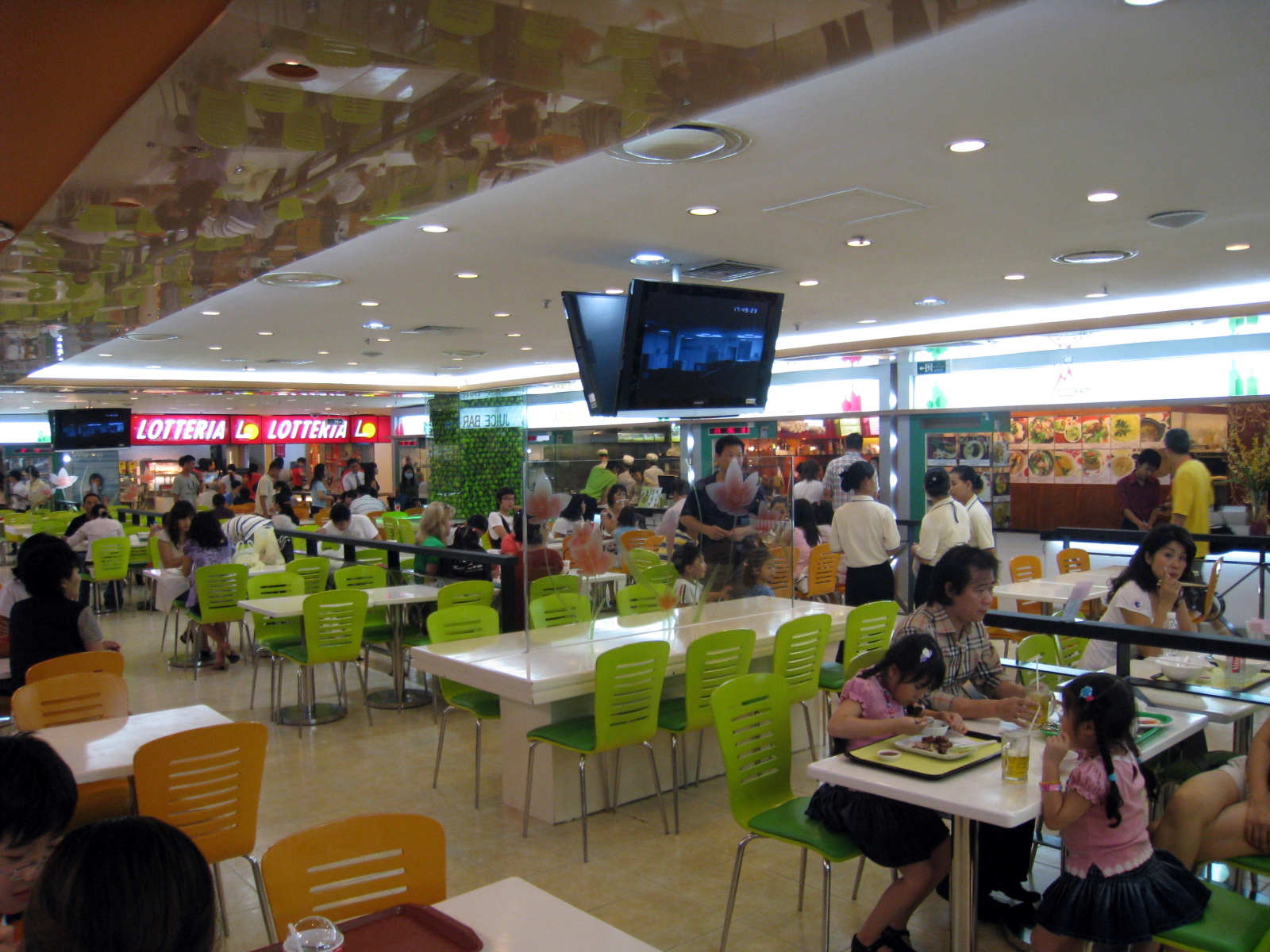
Diamond Plaza Level 3, Food court

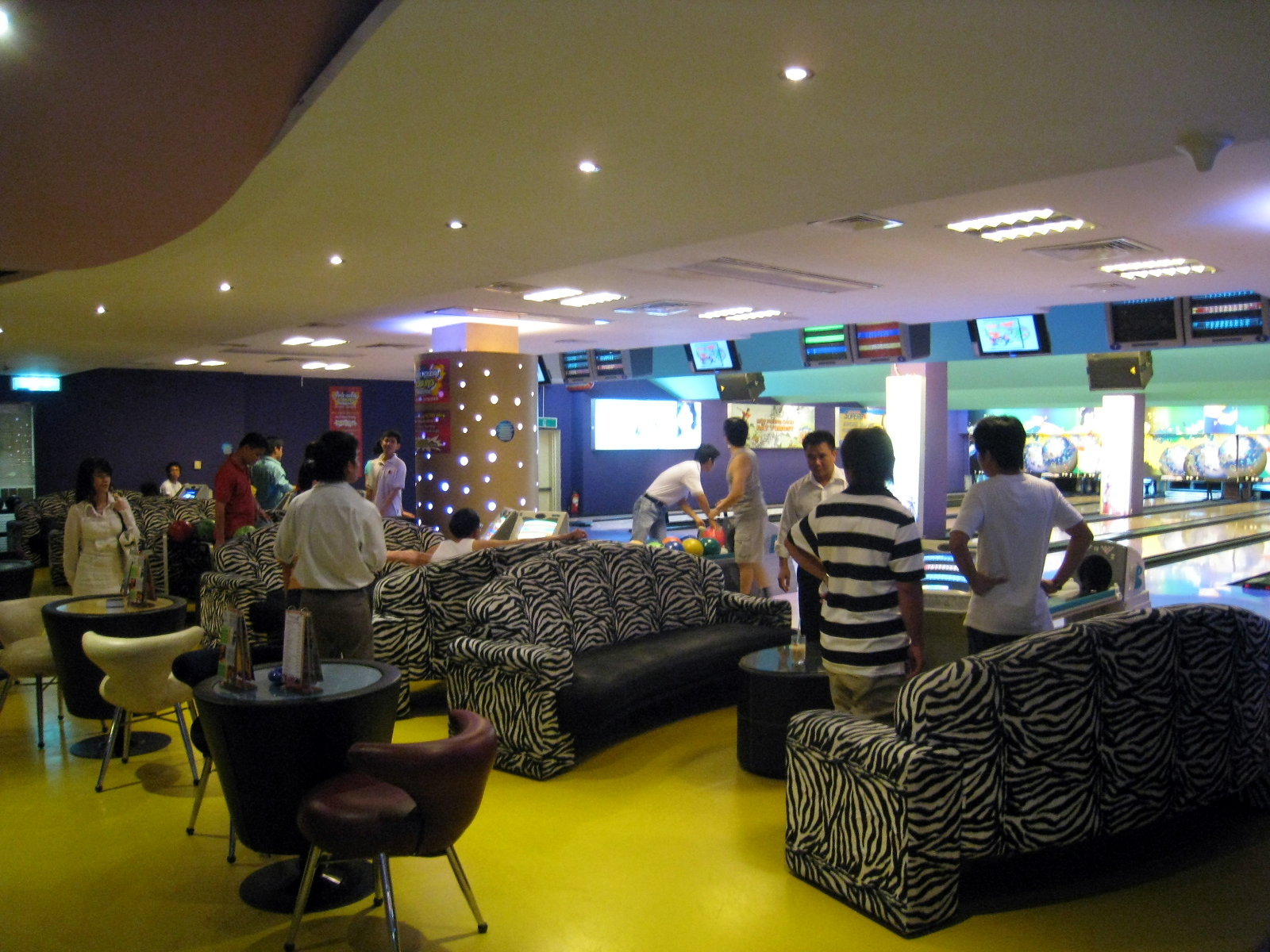
Diamond Plaza Level 3, Bowling Court (closed)

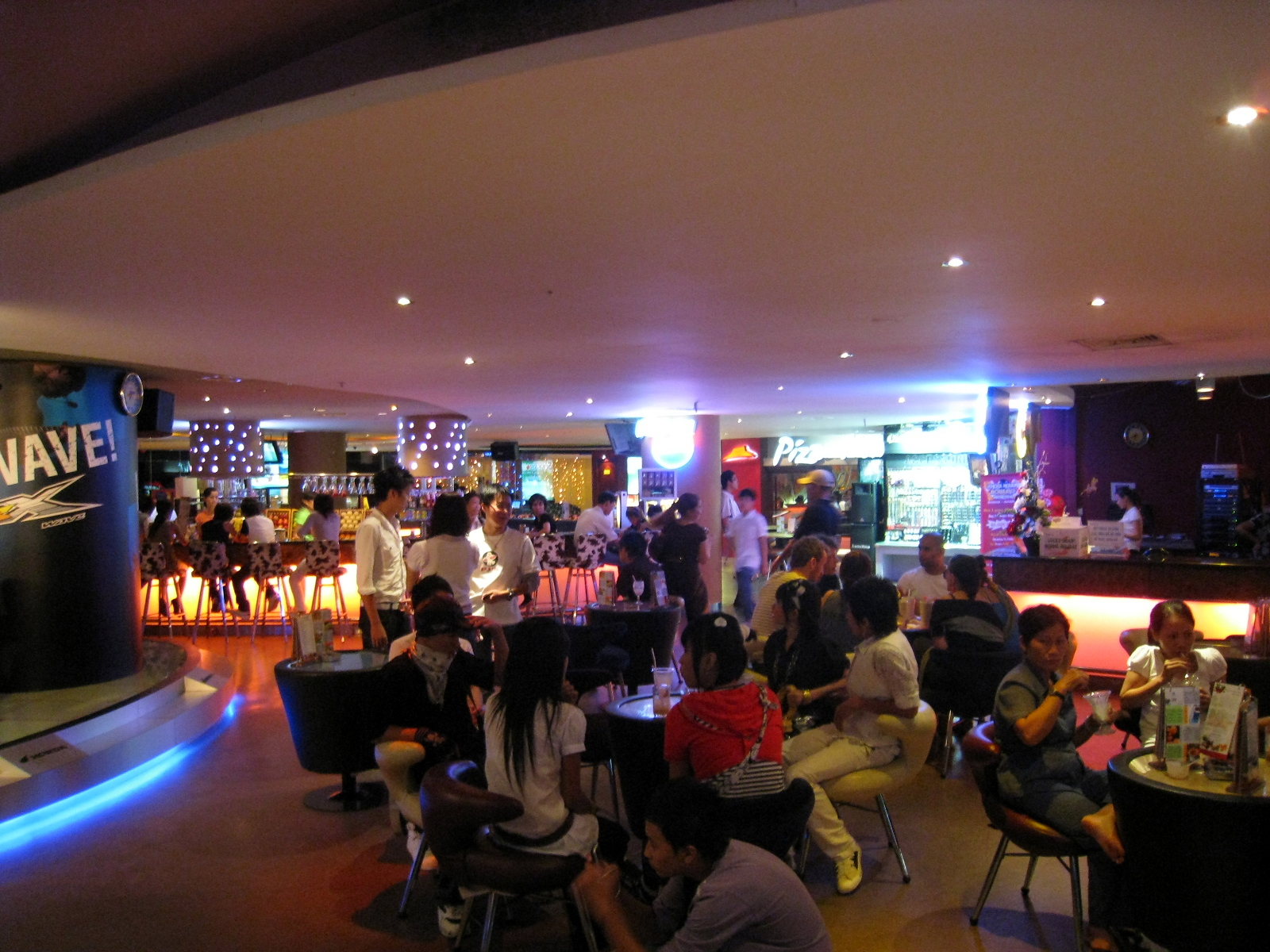
Diamond Plaza Level 4

Level	Use	Tenants
5	Restaurants, Café, Terrace Garden (Terrace 34)	Dao Niu Guo, Gióng Café, Italiani's Pizza, Menya Ichiban, Siniju, Steak Love
4	Foodcourt, Toy&Kid, Kitchenware, Home Fashion, convenience store, Customer Services	A. Paradise/L’amela/C Shop, Buttery Bakery, Cheong Kwan Jang, CRM, Chảo Deli, Doja Jjamppong, Everon, Frico, Home No. 1, Hallmark, Hikosen Cara, House Of Luggage, Hwa Pung Jeong, K-Bunsik, K-Market, Katsuya, Le Petit HaNoi, Lilliput Kids Café, Mykingdom Toys Store, Little Hong Kong, Noritake, Premium Housewares, Sa Maison, The Luxury Suite, Smeg, Thule, Tấm Saigon, Wundertute
3	Golf & Sports Fashion, Menswear, Shoes & Handbag, Lingeries, VIP Lounge, Nair Bar & Hair Salon	Gold Elements Spa, Trannsview Golf, Wacc, Descente, G/FORE, Hazzys, Discovery Luggage, Valentino Rudy, Valentino Creations, Geox, An Phước, Country Hide, Efora, ECCO, Cole Haan, Calvin Klein, Tommy Hilfiger, Banana Replublic, Lacoste, Crocs, Beverly Hills Polo Club, ONOFF, Lion Golf, Boss, Nail Bar, Menard Spa, Sulwhasoo Spa, Whoo Spa, New Balance, Casio, Rockport, Brikenstock, On Running, Leekaja Hair Salon, Levi's, Nike (with Nike Swim and Nike Golf)
2	Luxury Fashion & Goods, Womenswear, Jewelry & Accessories, Perfume, Handbags, Cosmetics	A.Paradise, Aqua Mineral, Celin Đại Phúc Jewelry, Elise, Furla, Mean BLVD, Kenneth, Harrn & Cath Kidston, Jaspal, J.estina, Lapli, Lộc Phúc, Maje, Origani, Pandora, PNJ, Sandro, Pleats Kora, Sisley, Swarovski, Prima, Runway, Thế Giới Kim Cương by DOJI, Tân Tân Watch, Triumph, Viin Riic, Wacoal, Love Moschino & Messy Weekend
1	Luxury Fashion, Cosmetics, Perfume, Coffee and Tea	Armani Beauty, Bobbi Brown, Bon Mua, Chanel, Cle de Peau Beauté, Clinique, Creed, Diptyque, Dyson, Elixir, Estée Lauder, Hermès, Jo Malone, L'apothiquaire, L'occitane Lancôme, M.A.C, Menard, Narciso, NARS, Runway, Prada Beauty, Shiseido, Sisley Beauty, Starbucks Reserve, Sulwhasoo, TWG Tea, Issey Miyake Valmont, APM Monaco, Whoo/Ohui

== Transport ==
- Bus routes: D1,
- HCMC Metro: Youth Cultural House station ( L3 L4 ; planned)

== Gallery ==
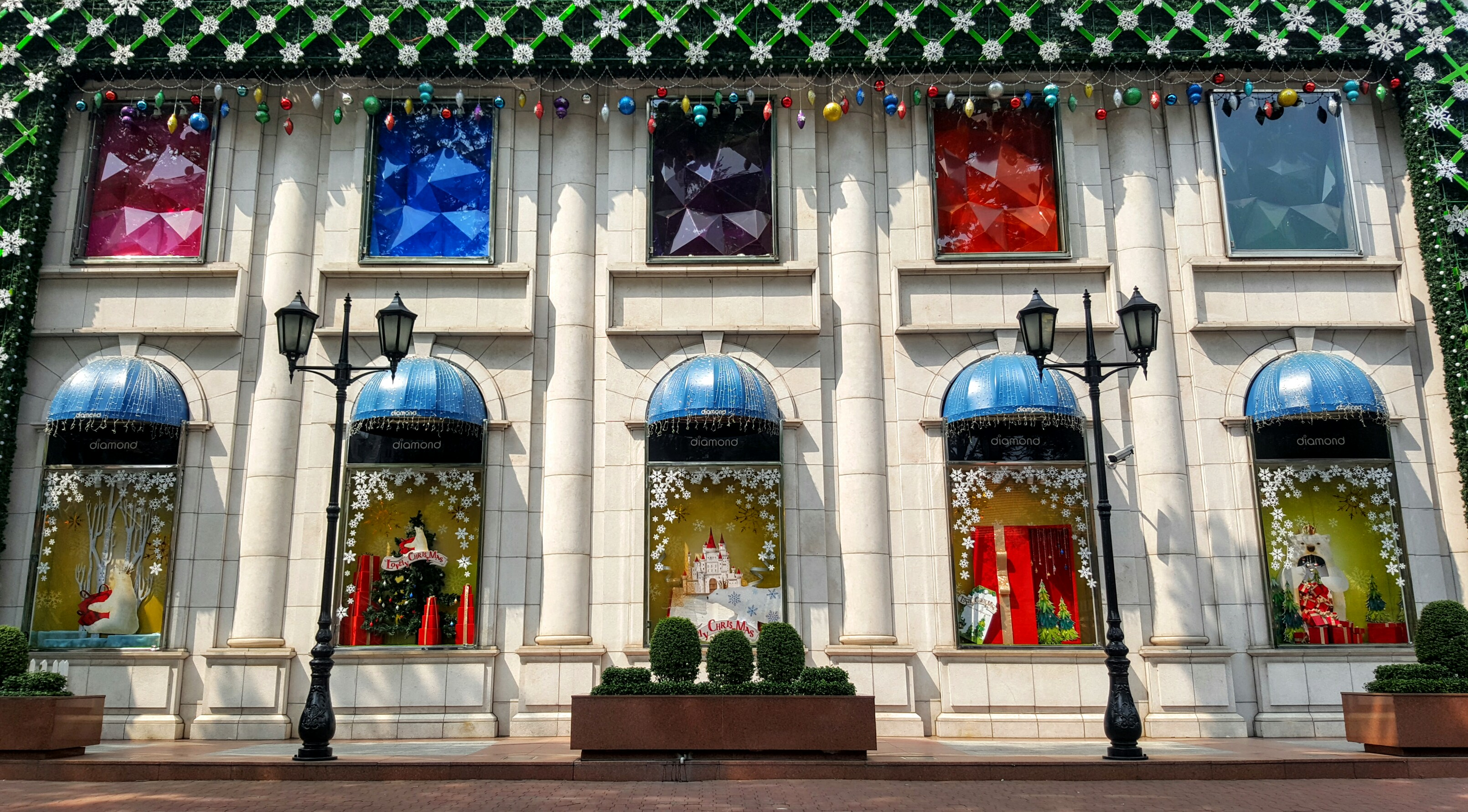
Diamond Plaza decorated for Christmas season

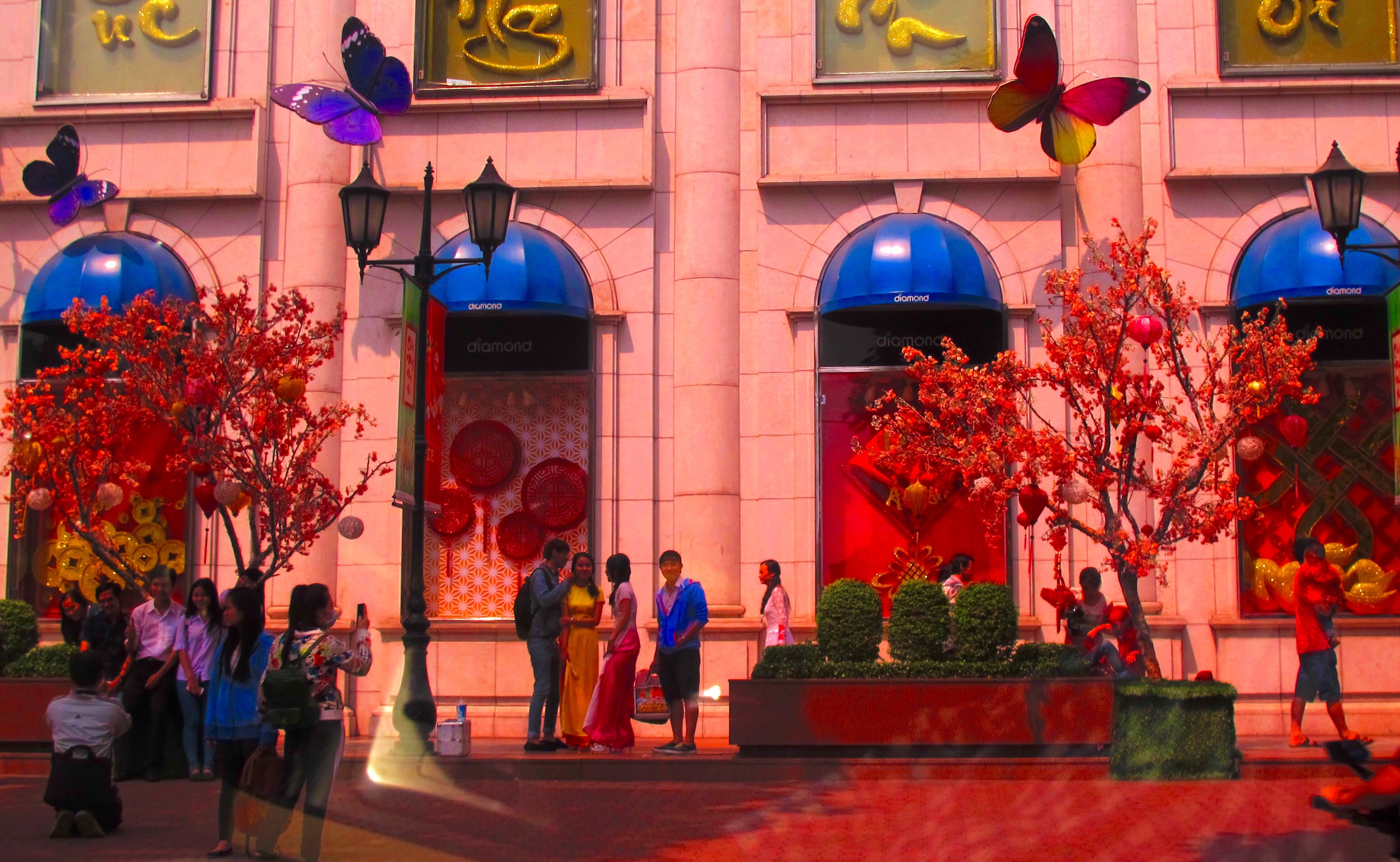
Diamond Plaza decorated for Tết season

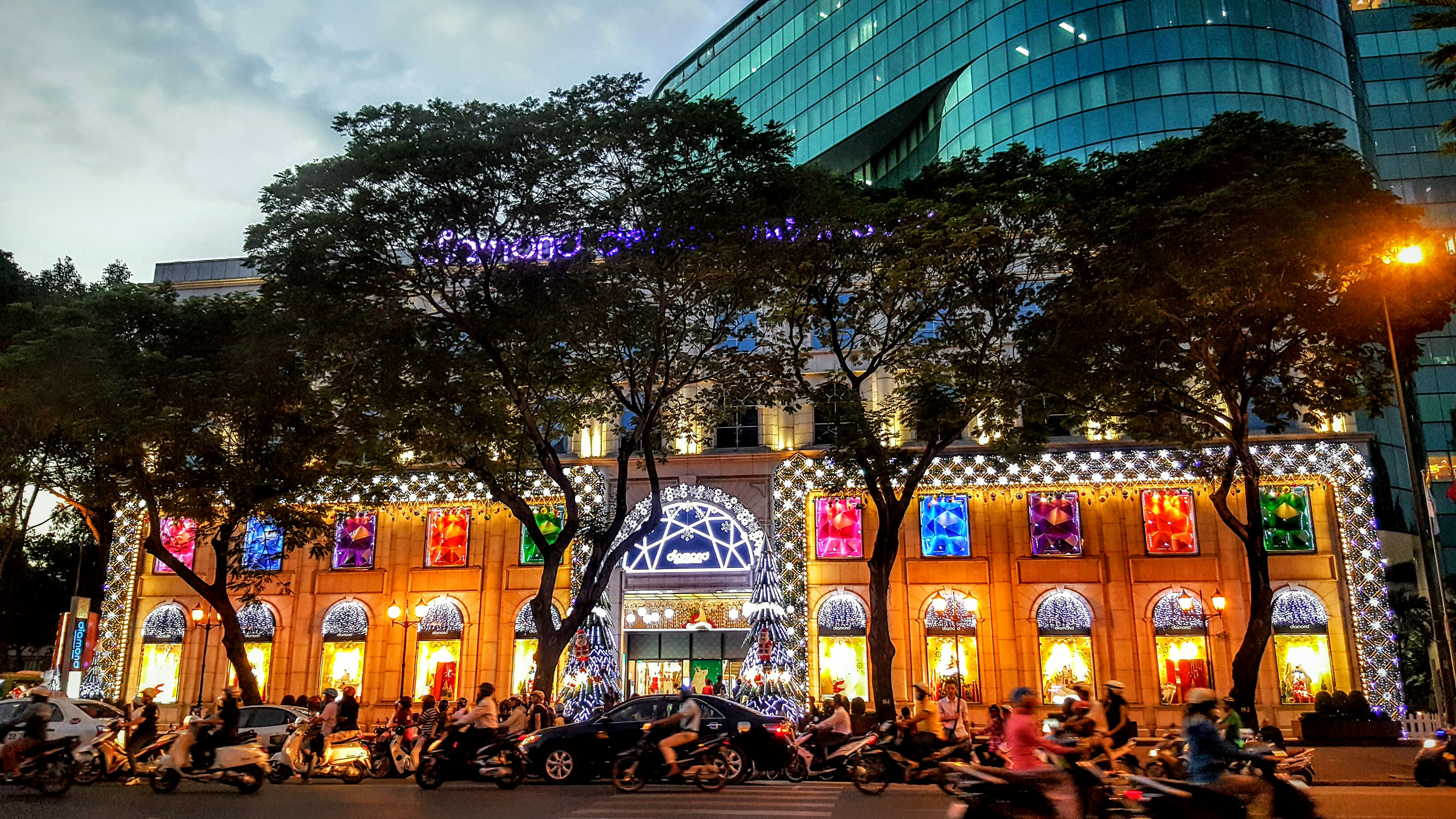
Diamond Plaza at night

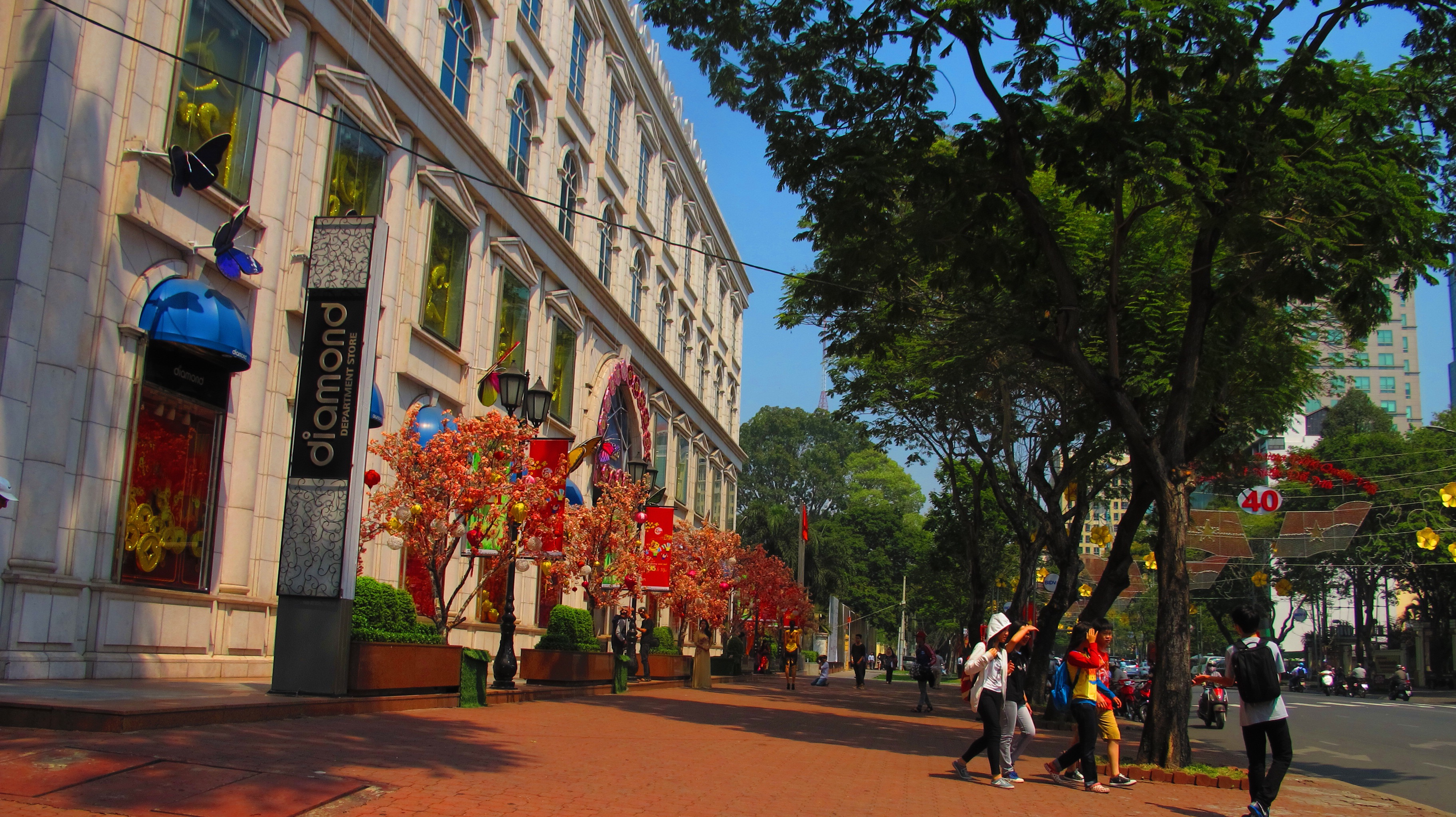
Diamond Plaza pavement

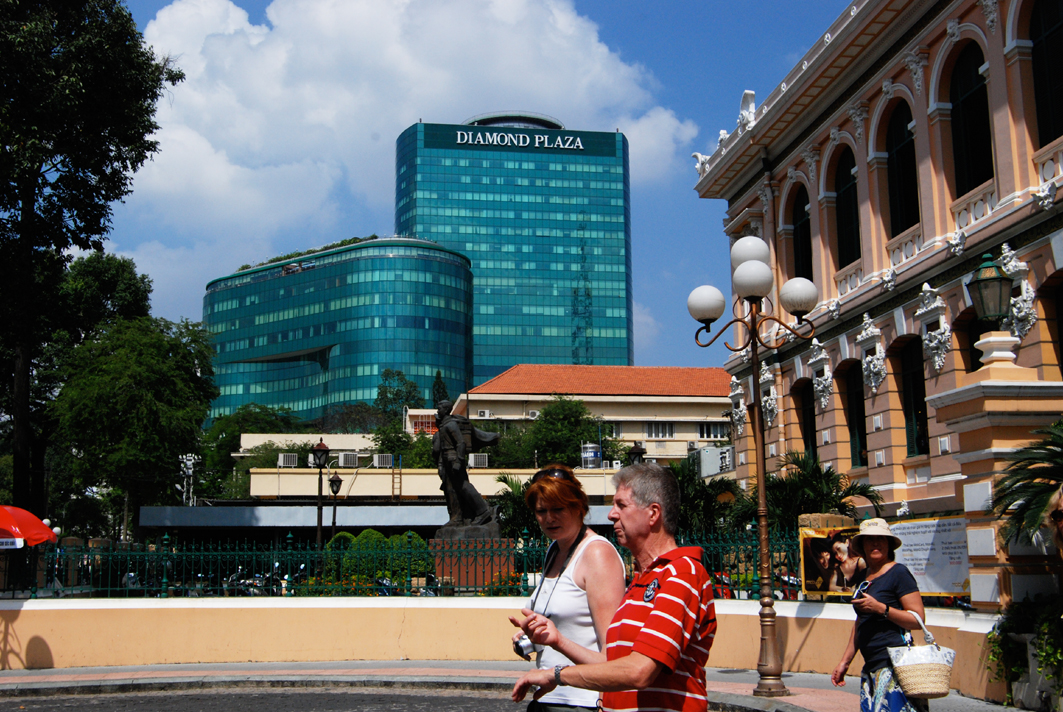
Diamond Plaza seen from front yard of Saigon Central Post Office

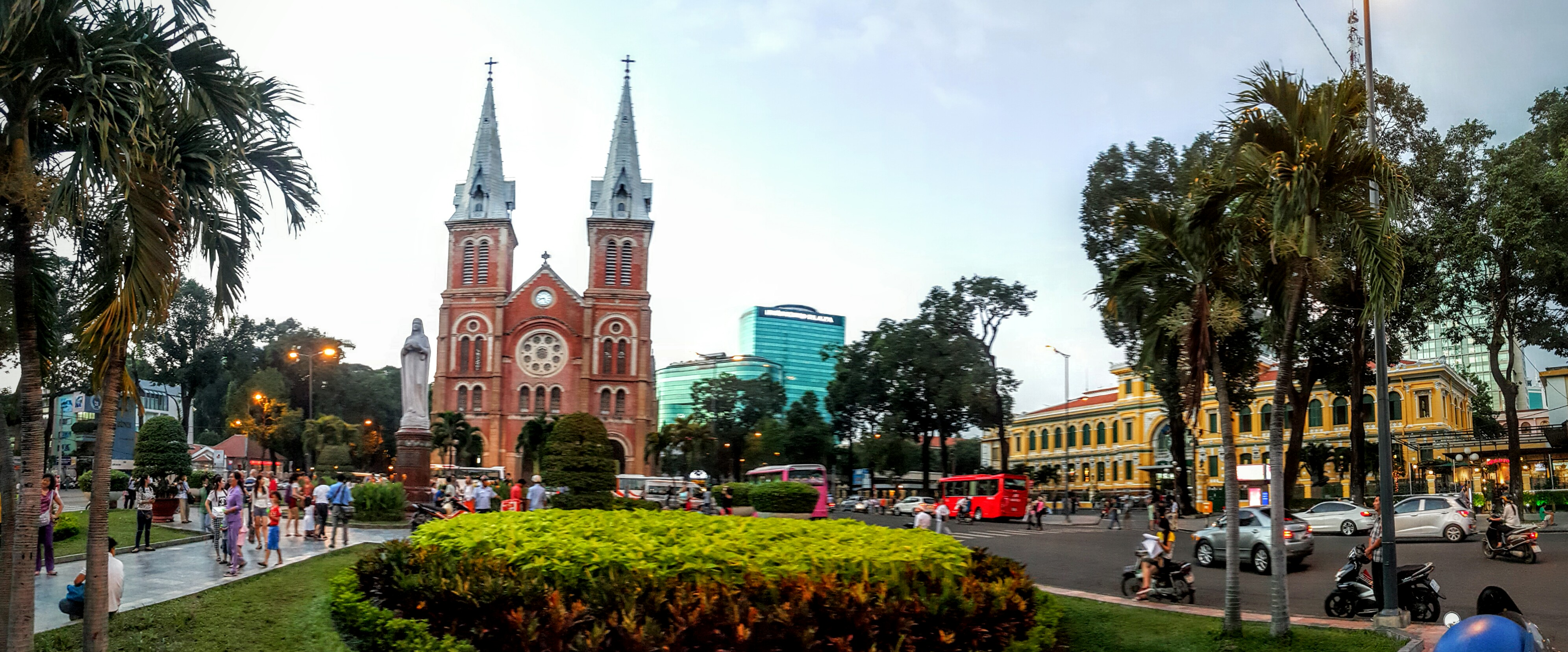
Diamond Plaza seen from Paris Commune Square

== See also ==
- Vincom Center Đồng Khởi
- Union Square Saigon
- Saigon Centre
- Crescent Mall
