= Minard =

Minard may refer to:

== Places ==
- Minard, Argyll, Scotland, United Kingdom
  - Minard Castle a castle in Argyll
- Minard Castle (County Kerry) a castle in County Kerry, Ireland

== People with the surname ==
- Charles Joseph Minard (1781–1870), French civil engineer and noted pioneer in infographics
- Chris Minard (born 1981), Canadian ice hockey player
- Christelle Minard (born 1970), French MP
- David Minard (1913–2005), American physiologist
- Joseph M. Minard (1932–2022), American politician from West Virginia
- Lawrence Minard (1949–2001), American journalist

== See also ==
- Menard (disambiguation)
