= Penard =

Penard is a surname. Notable people with the surname include:

- Eugène Penard (1855–1954), Swiss biologist
- Thomas E. Penard (1878–1936), American engineer and ornithologist

== See also ==
- Menard (surname)
- Renard (surname)
