= Megabox (cinema chain) =

South Korean movie theater chain

Megabox JoongAng Co., Ltd.
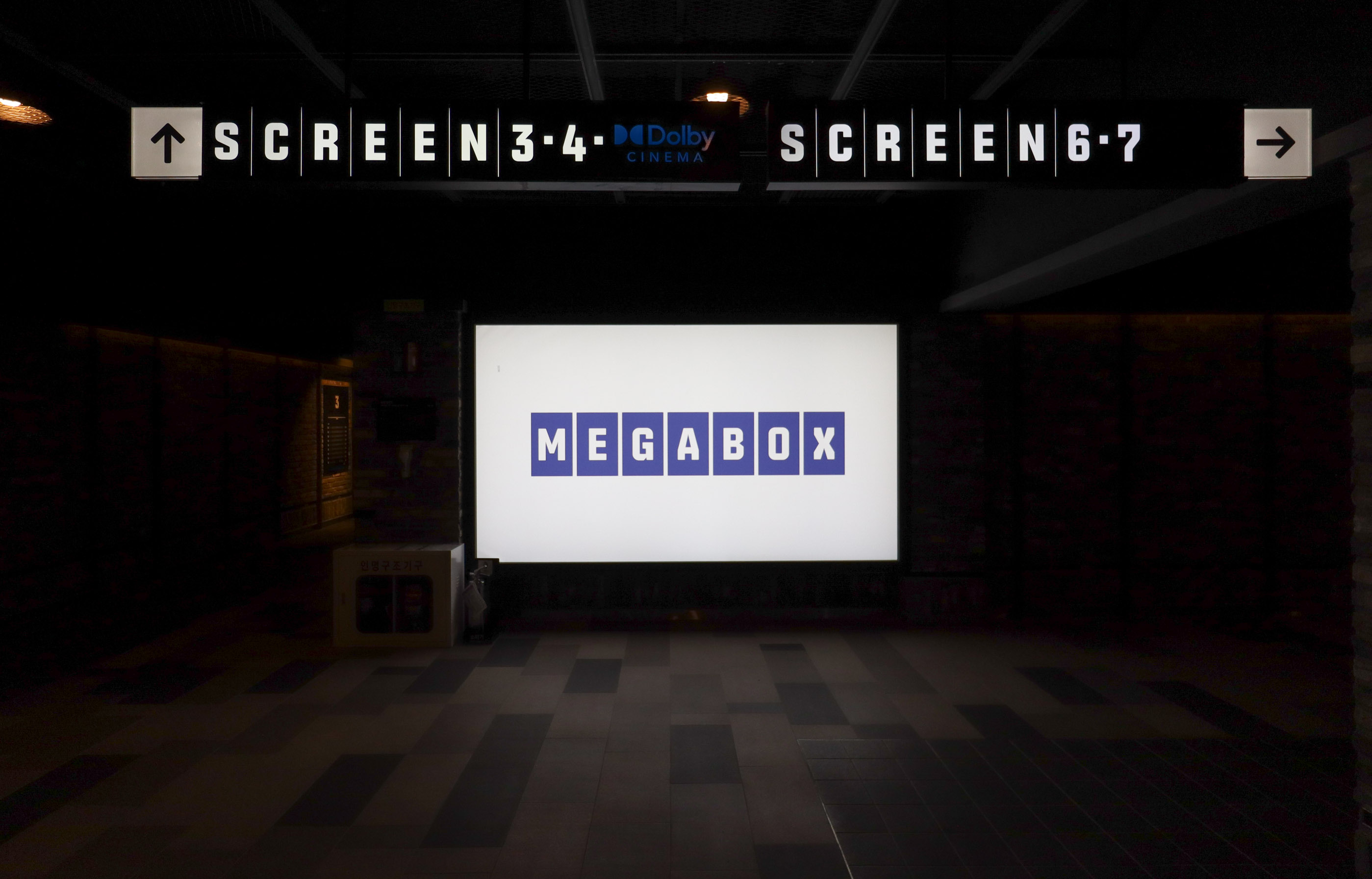
- Native name: 메가박스중앙 주식회사
- Industry: Film industry
- Founded: 16 November 1999; 26 years ago
- Headquarters: Seoul, South Korea
- Number of locations: 105
- Area served: South Korea
- Key people: Kim Jin-sun (CEO)
- Services: Multiplex cinema
- Owner: Contentree JoongAng
- Parent: JoongAng Group
- Subsidiaries: Plus M Entertainment
- Website: Megabox Korea

Megabox Joongang (Korean: 메가박스중앙; stylized as MEGABOX; 메가박스) is a multiplex cinema chain in South Korea, and the third largest multiplex theater company in the country, after CJ CGV and Lotte Cinema. It is headquartered in Cheongdam-dong, Gangnam-gu, Seoul. It was established in 2000 as a joint venture between Orion Confectionery and Loews Cineplex Entertainment, owned jointly by Sony Pictures and Universal Studios. It later merged with Cinus, owned by JoongAng Group's Media Network, in 2010. Currently, it operates 722 screens at 105 locations nationwide.

== History ==
Megabox is owned by a consortium of Australia-based Macquarie Group and Joongang Media Network subsidiary jcontentree. The first Megabox launched in COEX Mall in Samseong-dong in 2000 followed by another two years later in Busan for the international film festival. The chain grew to 14 branches. It was owned by North American-based Loews Cineplex Entertainment before being sold off by Onex Corporation in 2005.

Megabox is a multiplex theater. There is Art Nine, which is screened exclusively for art films. You can also watch art films at Megabox COEX.

On May 8, 2025, Megabox parent company JoongAng Group announced to merge the cinema chain alongside Lotte Cinema, forming as joint venture in hope to increase the competitiveness with CJ CGV. However, Lotte Shopping disclosed on July 1, 2026 that the memorandum of understanding between the two parties was terminated, resulting in the proposed merger's collapse.

== Cinus ==
Cinus is a Korean movie theater chain company. It merged small theater companies such as Gangnam Central 6 and Bundang Cine Plaza in December, 2004. The theaters paid franchise fees. The franchise headquarters started direct marketing integration. On September 18, 2008, it was acquired by ISPlus (Daily Sports), an affiliate of Joongang Ilbo. On June 17, 2011, ISPlus changed its name to Jcontentree. Cinus (grape in Latin), had 31 outlets. Cinus acquired Megabox in 2010. On May 20, 2011, it merged with Megabox, temporarily using the name Megabox Cinus and then fully adopting the Megabox name in the latter half of the year. In 2008, the company was reborn as a Sinus union company in partnership with Dansung Co. Dansung Company was transferred to Asan M Group on September 23.

== Megabox Cinus ==
Megabox Cinus is a company made by combining Megabox and Sunus. After the merger, JC Content was the major shareholder. As a separate brand, it merged with the Megabox brand on November 1, 2011 and consolidated its website.

== Theater models ==
- Dolby Atmos (Goyang Starfield, Daejeon Hyundai Outlet, Mokdong, Sangam World Cup Stadium, Seongsu, Suwon Starfield, Chungju yeonsu, Pohang, Hanam Starfield): The upgraded version of the M2 adds Barco's premium 6P laser projector projection system that delivers 56,000 lumens brightness and 4096x2160 full 4K UHD resolution through six laser sources, Prima Silver Premium Screen, and Meyer Sound EXP (US) and Dolby ATMOS (US).
- PREMIUM (Daejeon, Shindae, Cheonan, COEX) : Seats offer two arm rests, Mayer/JBL High power speakers, personal tables.
- TABLE M (Gwangju, Gimpo, Daegu, Deokcheon, Mokdong, Baekseok, Sokcho, Jeonju, Kintex, Paju Geumchon, Haeundae): The auditorium is equipped with a table to secure individual space and rests for both arms.
- BOUTIQUE M (Bundang, Central, COEX): Boutique hotel personality.
- BALCONY M (Bundang): Balcony seating.
- The FIRST CLUB (KINTEX): Bed-type seating and VIP lounge
- DRIVE M (Yongin): Open-air car theater with a barbecue.
- OPEN M (Baekseok, One mount): Urban camping installed on a rooftop.
- MEGA KIDS BOX (Yeongtong): Children's theater with high-definition screen for watching movies in bright surroundings.

== Price of a movie ticket ==
In 2016, general tickets were 9,000 won, and they increased by 1,000 won every year. Due to the COVID-19 pandemic, the film industry has been in crisis and raised once again in 2020. So tickets are priced at 13,000 won as of 2021.

Megabox and three other Korean multiplexes said they will discount movie tickets only for vaccinated people in order to encourage them to vaccinate against COVID-19. Up to one companion can watch the movie at an exceptional price(5,000 to 6,000 won).

Megabox will raise movie tickets from July 5, 2021, changing its price to 13,000 won during the week and 14,000 won during the weekend.
