= Lotte Cultureworks =

South Korean entertainment company

- Native name: 롯데컬처웍스
- Type: Private
- Industry: Entertainment
- Founded: September 1999
- Headquarters: Songpa District, Seoul, South Korea
- Key people: Byung-hwan Choi, CEO
- Services: Distribution, film production, finance, exhibition
- Owner: Lotte Corporation (aka Lotte Group)
- Parent: Lotte Shopping
- Divisions: Lotte Entertainment, Lotte Cinema
- Website: www.lottecinema.co.kr

Lotte Cultureworks (Korean: 롯데컬처웍스) is a Republic of Korea company that houses Lotte Cinema (Korean: 롯데시네마) and Lotte Entertainment (Korean: 롯데엔터테인먼트).

== History ==
Lotte Cultureworks originally began as Lotte Cinema, which was a division of Lotte Shopping, in 1999. In September 2003, Lotte Entertainment was created under Lotte Shopping to manage film production, distribution, investment, and international sales. In 2018, Lotte Corporation spun-off the entertainment branch from Lotte Shopping as Lotte Cultureworks, which houses both Lotte Cinema and Lotte Entertainment.

Lotte Cinema operates 142 theaters in Korea, as well as 40 theaters in Vietnam. In 2014, Lotte Cinema World Tower opened to the public with 21 screens and 4,615 seats.

Lotte Entertainment is the production, distribution and international sales division of Lotte Cultureworks. Lotte Entertainment is a sub-distributor of American film studio Paramount Pictures in Korea.

In 2018, Lotte Cultureworks overtook CJ Entertainment to become the country's leading distributor, following the box-office success of fantasy franchise Along With the Gods.

The current CEO of Lotte Cultureworks is Byung-Hwan Choi, the former CEO of CJ CGV.

== Partnership Deals ==
In May 2019, Lotte Cultureworks signed a joint business agreement with INNOCEAN, a marketing subsidiary of Hyundai Motor Group, to partner in business, global expansion, marketing and advertising.

In February 2023, Lotte Cultureworks signed a business agreement with Disney Theatrical Productions, a performance production subsidiary of The Walt Disney Company. The first musical performance in Korea will be "Aladdin" in 2024.

== International Expansions ==
Lotte Cinema Vietnam

In 2008, Lotte Cinema started operating a global chain in Vietnam. By 2016, Lotte comprised 30% of the Vietnam film market and was the second largest chain.

Lotte Entertainment Vietnam

Lotte Entertainment Vietnam was established in 2017 with the goal of producing local content.

In 2019, Lotte distributed the film "Furie" (Hai Phượng) which was recorded as the very first Vietnamese film to surpass the revenue milestone of VND 200 billion.

In 2020, Lotte distributed the film "Blood Moon Party" (Tiệc trăng máu) which was recorded as the first Vietnamese movie to gross VND 155 billion in just four weeks after its release.
