= Menear =

Menear is a surname. Notable people with the surname include:

- Craig Menear (born 1958), American business executive
- Hoy Menear (died 2023), American politician
- Kevin Menear, American radio personality
- Stacey Menear, American director of Brahms: The Boy II, Mixtape and The Boy.

== See also ==
- Menard
- Menarche
