= Lotte Entertainment =

South Korean entertainment company under Lotte Cultureworks

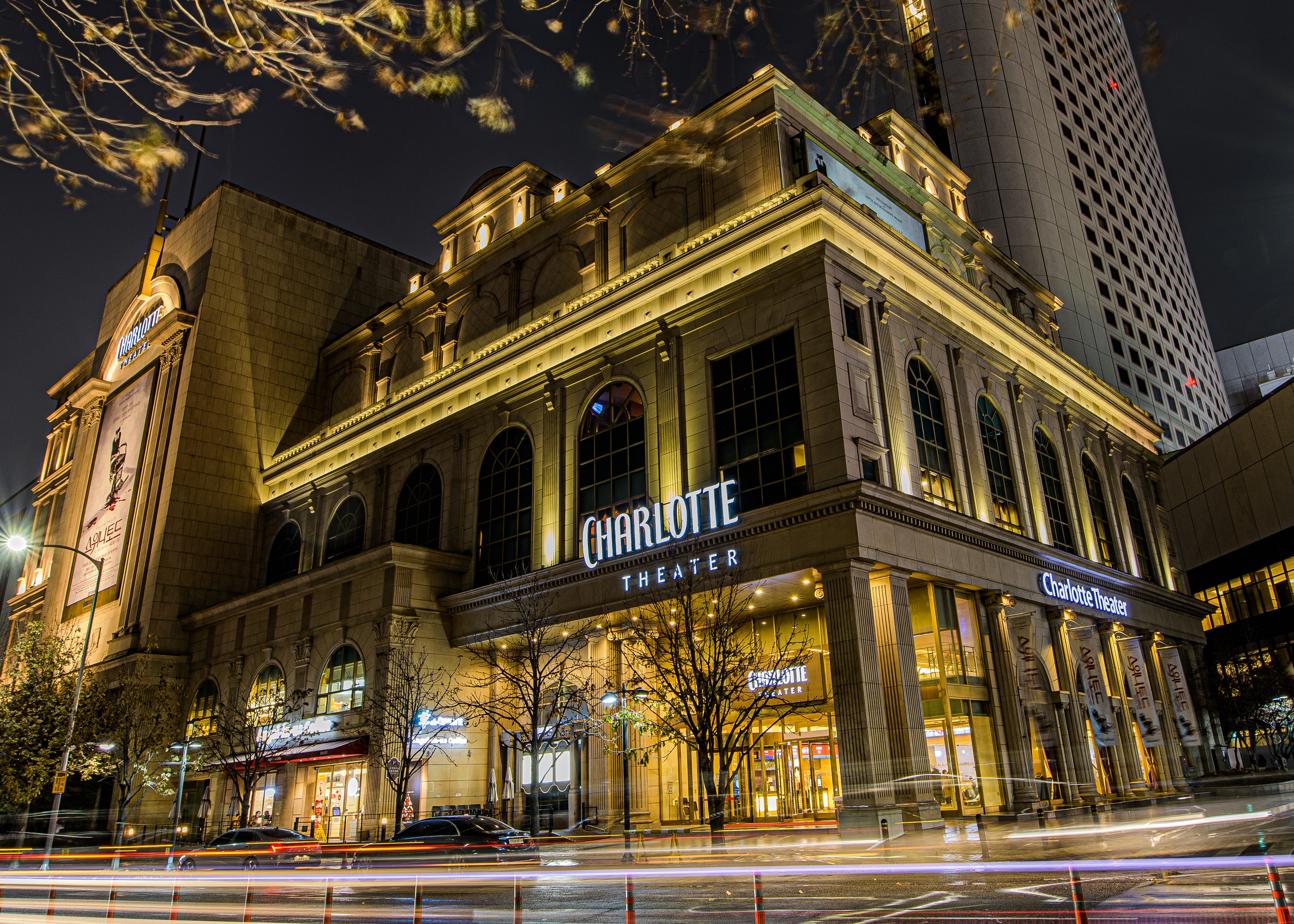
- Exterior of Lotte’s Charlotte Theater in Songpa district
- Native name: 롯데엔터테인먼트
- Type: Subsidiary
- Industry: Film, TV Series, Musicals
- Founded: September 2003
- Headquarters: Songpa District, Seoul, South Korea
- Services: film production, exhibition, distribution, television production, financing
- Owner: Lotte Corporation (aka Lotte Group)
- Parent: Lotte Cultureworks
- Subsidiaries: Lotte Entertainment Vietnam
- Website: lotteent.com

Lotte Entertainment (Korean: 롯데엔터테인먼트) is a South Korean film producer and distributor and entertainment division under Lotte Cultureworks (Korean: 롯데컬처웍스), which is a Republic of Korea company that also houses Lotte Cinema (Korean: 롯데시네마).

== History ==
In September 2003, Lotte Entertainment was created under Lotte Shopping to manage film production, distribution, investment, and international sales. In 2018, Lotte Corporation spun-off the entertainment branch from Lotte Shopping as Lotte Cultureworks which includes both Entertainment and Cinema divisions.

The Lotte Entertainment division was created to focus its operations in the motion pictures industry, and is often included in Korea's "Big 4" of the major film industry distributors along with CJ ENM, Showbox, and NEW.

In 2006, Lotte Entertainment established the Charlotte Theater in Songpa district in Seoul, which was Korea's first venue solely dedicated to musicals.

== International distribution ==
In early 2015, the company signed a theatrical distribution deal with Paramount Pictures which allowed Lotte to distribute all of Paramount's films in South Korea, after Paramount ended its theatrical distribution deal with CJ Entertainment that year.

In 2016, Lotte Entertainment joined the Globalgate consortium which is led by Lionsgate. As part of the agreement, Lotte represents the Korean and Vietnamese film markets.

== Releases ==
=== Films ===
Along with the Gods: The Two Worlds (released in 2017) and Along with the Gods: The Last 49 Days (released in 2018) are considered the most successful film series in Korea. The first film still ranks as the third most watched Korean film of all time. The franchise is based on a popular Korean web comic of the same title.

The zombie apocalypse thriller #Alive (released in 2020) was the first Korean film to be ranked No. 1 in the U.S. and Europe on Netflix streaming platform. The film also reached No. 1 on movie charts across 35 countries.

Escape from Mogadishu (released in 2021) was the highest grossing Korean film in 2021 and a Korean Oscar Contender for 2022.

=== Television series ===
Year	Title	Original title	Network	Associated production	Ref.
2019	Joseon Survival Period	조선 생존기	TV Chosun	Huayi Brothers Korea; HIGROUND	
2019	The Great Show	위대한 쇼	tvN	Huayi Brothers Korea; Studio Dragon	
2021	Joseon Exorcist	조선구마사	SBS TV	Studio S (SBS); YG STUDIOPLEX; Crave Works	
2023	Pale Moon	종이달	ENA	Big Ocean ENM	
