= Ménard =

Ménard is a French surname. Notable people with the surname include:

- André Ménard, Governor General in the French colonial empire
- Antoine Ménard, dit Lafontaine (1744–1825), building contractor and politician in Lower Canada
- Christian Ménard (born 1946), member of the National Assembly of France
- Claude Ménard (athlete) (1906–1980), French high jump athlete
- Claude Ménard (economist) (born 1944), Canadian economist
- Constance Menard (born 1968), French professional Dressage rider and equestrienne
- D.L. Menard (1932–2017), Cajun music songwriter and performer
- Dollard Ménard (1913–1997), Canadian general wounded five times in 1942 at Dieppe
- Émile-René Ménard (1862–1930), French landscape and antique painter
- Henry William Menard (1920–1986), American geologist
- Hillary "Minnie" Menard (born 1934), Canadian hockey player
- Howie Menard (born 1942), National Hockey League player
- Jean-François Ménard (born 1948), French author and translator, known for translating the Harry Potter books into French
- Jean-Michel Ménard (born 1976), first francophone curler from Quebec to win the Brier (2006)
- Joan M. Menard (born 1935), member of the Massachusetts Senate
- John Menard Jr. (born 1940), American businessman; founder and owner of the Menards chain of home improvement stores
- John Willis Menard (1838–1893), first African-American elected to the United States Congress
- Léon Ménard (1706–1767), French lawyer and historical writer
- Louis-Nicolas Ménard (1822–1901), French discoverer of collodion
- Malika Ménard (born 1987), Miss France 2010
- Marc Menard, Canadian actor
- Marie-Gabrielle Ménard, Canadian politician
- Michel Ménard (born 1961), member of the National Assembly of France
- Michel Branamour Ménard (1805–1856), Canadian-born trader and founder of Galveston, Texas
- Nellie Star Boy Menard (1910–2001), American quiltmaker
- Nicolas-Hugues Ménard (1585–1644), Maurist scholar
- Nicole Ménard, Canadian politician
- Paul Menard (born 1980), son of John Jr., NASCAR driver
- Phil Menard (1923–2016), French accordion player active in Louisiana
- Pierre Menard (1766–1844), fur trader and Illinois politician
- Réal Ménard (born 1962), Canadian politician
- René Menard (1605–1661), French Jesuit missionary explorer in North America
- Russell Menard, professor of British colonization in North America
- Serge Ménard, Canadian politician
- Susan Menard, American politician

== See also ==
- Bouillé-Ménard, French commune in the Maine-et-Loire department
- Menard (disambiguation)
- Minard (disambiguation)
- Menards, chain of home improvement stores in the Midwestern United States
