= Achagoyle Bay =

Bay in Argyll and Bute, Scotland

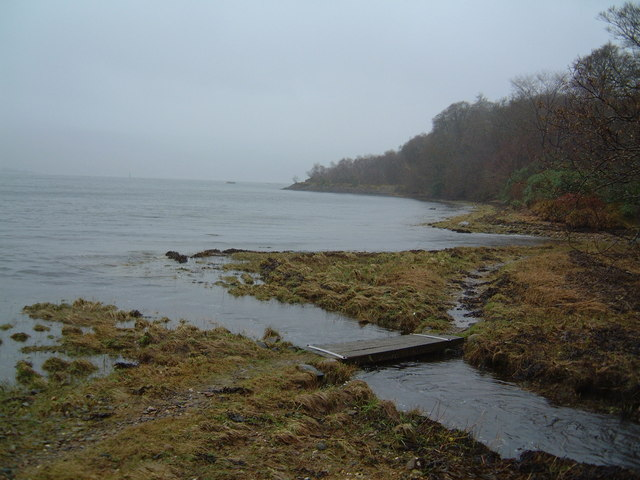
- High Tide on the heritage trail Walking along the edge of Achagoyle Bay from the car park at Minard, the first bridge you come to on the Brainport Heritage Trail.

- Location within Argyll and Bute
- Location: Minard
- Coordinates: 56.114044°N 5.253345°W
- Type: sea loch bay
- River sources: Alltan Tosdach; Auchgoyle Burn
- Islands: An Oitir; Eilean; Aoghainn; Eilean Fraoch; Brideagan

Achagoyle Bay is coastal embayment, on a chord of 0.75 miles, on a 114° orientation, on the western coast of the longest sea loch in Scotland, Loch Fyne located in Argyll and Bute, on the west coast of Scotland. Achagoyle Bay is directly northwest of Brainport Bay on a NNE orientation, which forms a rightward hook, and opens into the Minard Bay with a NE orientation, also with a rightward hook, directly south. The three bays constitute the western edge of the Minnow Narrows which is bounded by the islands An Oitir and Eilean Aoghainn directly to the east of Brainport Bay.

== Settlements ==
The small village of Minard is on the northwest corner of the Achagoyle Bay.

== Geography ==
Achagoyle Bay is dominated by the large hill Beinn Ghlas, one of the Marilyns in southern Scotland, at 420m to the north. Beinn Ghlas forms a ridge that parallels Loch Fyne to the northwest. Most of the area surrounding Achagoyle Bay is heavily forested.

== Bronze age feature ==
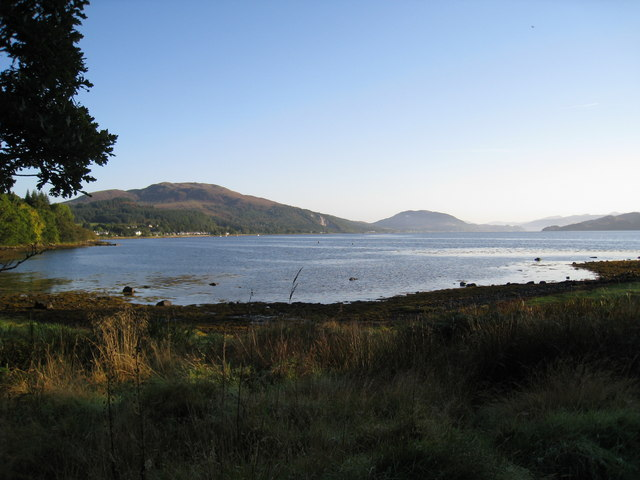
Brainport Bay Furnace quarry in the distance

To the south of the bay, on Brainport Bay, lies a Bronze Age structure, that was excavated in the 1970s, and dates to the mid 2nd millennium BC. It achieved notoriety in the 1970s when it was excavated by the local archaeological society, when a curious alignment of artificial structures came to light. It includes a back platform, a flat area around a natural rock outcrop, two large boulders standing on end, known as the observation boulders, with a flat cobbled area between, and a main platform, again artificially enhanced. The main platform appears to have been an extraordinary sighting device. Two slender standing stones, of a height of slightly over 1m tall stood upright in clefts between the rocks. Although they have fallen, these two stones would have lined up, on a notch between two mountains, on the distant horizon from the site, some 30 miles northeast along the loch.

During the Bronze Age, the midsummer sunrise would have occurred just a little to the left of the north, crossing the exact alignment, passing just above the north a few minutes later. The stones were designed, such that even in bad weather, a sighting would have still been made, that would appear exactly with the notch, and aligned perfectly.
