= Minard, Argyll =

Coordinates: 56.116459°N 5.25199°W

Minard
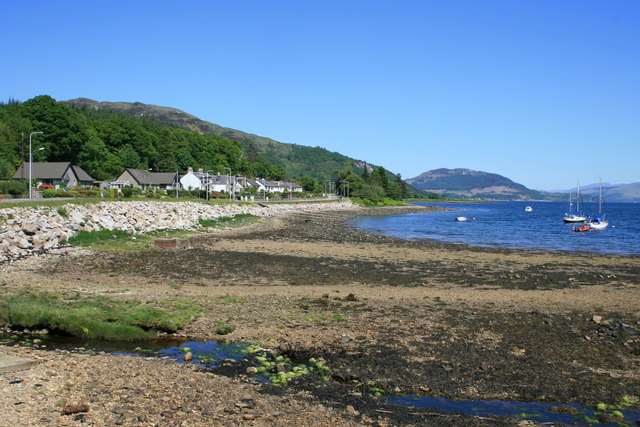
- Minard and Loch Fyne Minard cottages mid-way between Inveraray and Lochgilphead on the shore of Loch Fyne.

- Location within Argyll and Bute
- OS grid reference: NR979964
- Civil parish: Kilmichael-Glassary parish
- Council area: Argyll and Bute
- Lieutenancy area: Argyll and Bute
- Country: Scotland
- Sovereign state: United Kingdom
- Post town: Inveraray
- Postcode district: PA32
- Dialling code: 01546
- UK Parliament: Argyll, Bute and South Lochaber
- Scottish Parliament: Argyll and Bute

Minard is a rural village on the western shore of Loch Fyne, situated between Inveraray and Lochgilphead. Minard is 13 1/2 miles (21.7 km) southwest of Inveraray, and is located at the northwestern corner of Achagoyle Bay. Minard is a linear village with lochside bungalows which has seen extensive building. Along the A83 road to the south is a school, church, village hall and several older cottages which break up the linear aspect.

== Settlements ==
Minard was originally part of the estate of Minard Castle before it became an independent village. The nearest large settlement is Inveraray to the north east, along the A83 road, passing Furnace and Auchindrain. To the south, the A83 follows the curves on the loch, with Lochgilphead being the biggest town in the south.

== Geography ==
Minard is located on the northwest corner of the rocky shallow circle of Achagoyle Bay.

== Gallery ==
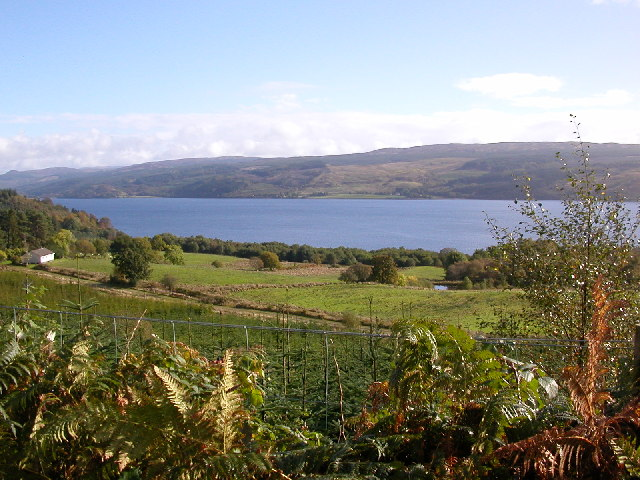
Kilmichael near Minard, Argyll. View of Kilmichael and Loch Fyne, Argyllshire.

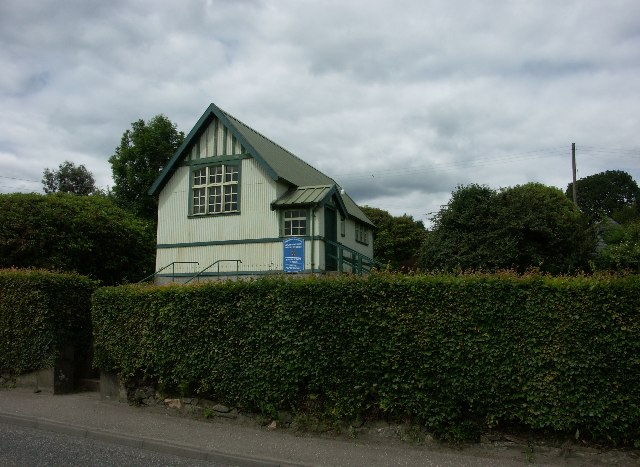
Lochfyneside parish Church, Minard, Argyll.

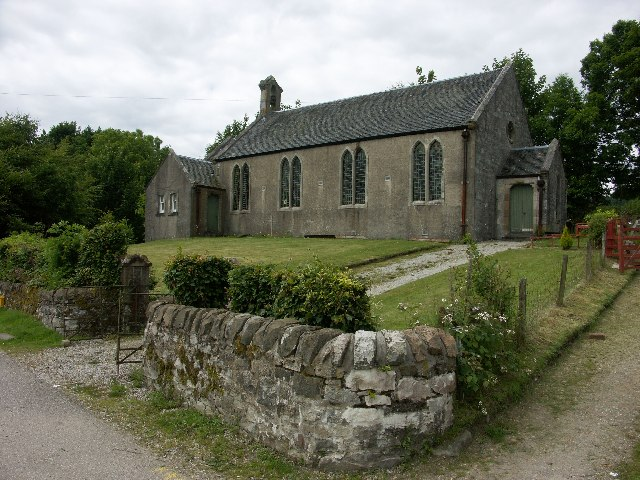
Lochfyneside Free Church, Minard, Argyll.

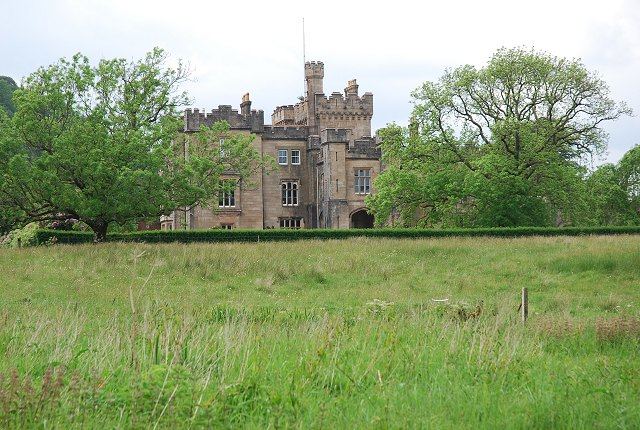
Minard Castle A view from the south and the shores of Loch Fyne.

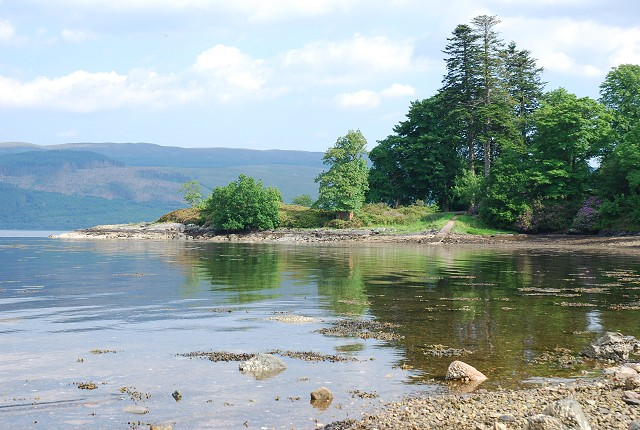
File:Minard Point - geograph.org.uk - 461006.jpg

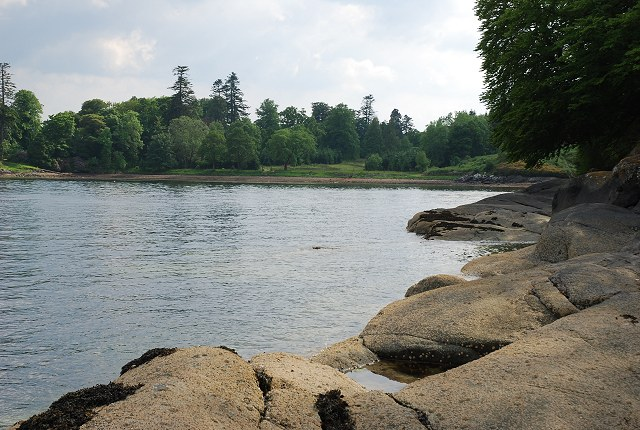
Minard Bay A view from the Brainport Heritage Trail.

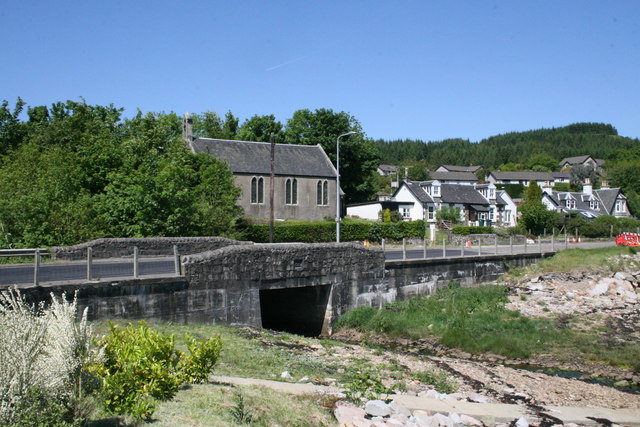
Auchgoyle Burn Outlet at Minard Auchgoyle Burn Outlet and Bridge at Minard
