= Lotte Cinema =

South Korean movie theater division under Lotte Cultureworks

- Native name: 롯데시네마
- Type: Private
- Industry: Movie theater, Theatres
- Founded: 1999
- Headquarters: Songpa District, Seoul, South Korea
- Services: Movie theater
- Owner: Lotte Corporation (aka Lotte Group)
- Parent: Lotte Cultureworks
- Website: lotteent.com

Lotte Cinema (Korean: 롯데시네마) started as the Cinema Business Division under Lotte Shopping in 1999 with the concept of focusing on launching a new entertainment era. As part of the rapid growth of the Korean film industry in the early 2000s, Lotte Cinema expanded its market share and is now the second largest multiplex chain in Korea.

Lotte Cinema currently operates 143 sites with 842 screens nationwide in South Korea as a division of entertainment business of the Lotte Group under the name Lotte Cultureworks along with Lotte Entertainment.

== History ==
Lotte Cinema started as the Cinema Business Division under Lotte Shopping in 1999. By September 2003, Lotte Shopping's Cinema Business Division had been involved in the planning and production of movie imports, distribution, investment projects and performances under the name of Lotte Entertainment.

In 2018, Lotte Corporation rearranged their Cinema Business Division by moving Lotte Cinema under Lotte Cultureworks along with Lotte Entertainment.

On May 8, 2025, Megabox parent company JoongAng Group announced to merge the cinema chain alongside Lotte Cinema, forming as joint venture in hope to increase the competitiveness with CJ CGV.

== Theater experiences ==
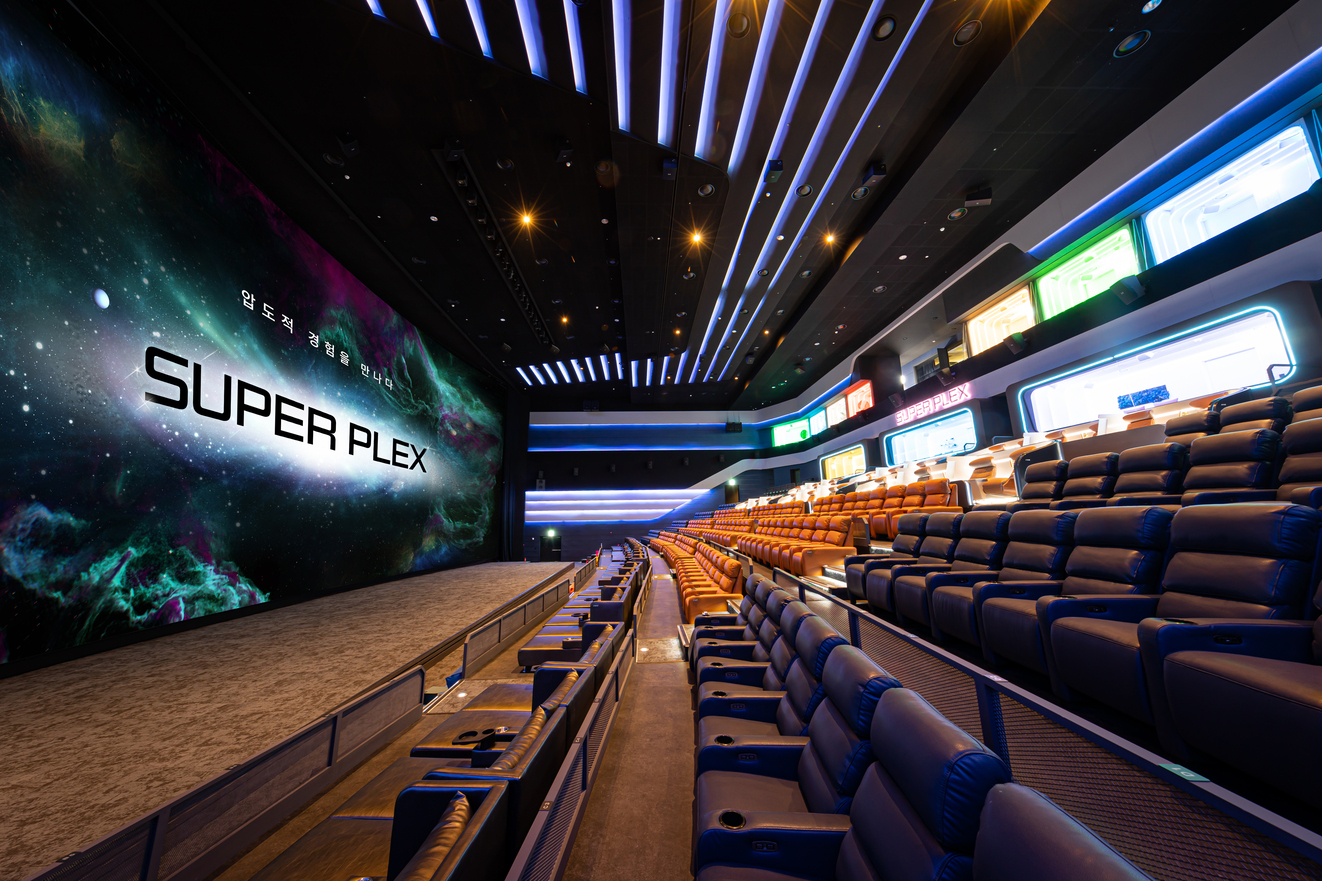
Inside the Lotte Cinema Super Plex World Tower theater

In 2014, Lotte Cinema World Tower opened to the public with 21 screens and 4,615 seats. Lotte Cinema's signature cinema is located in Lotte World Tower.

After the film industry went through the COVID pandemic, Korean multiplex chains started experimenting with different theater formats to bring customers back. Lotte Cinema launched the 'Culture Square', a complex cultural space to enjoy new experiences and content.

Below are the various premium theater formats owned by Lotte Cinema:

Theater format	Description	Locations	Ref.
SUPER PLEX World Tower	Formerly named SUPER PLEX G, the theater was renamed in 2022 and houses the world's largest screen (34m x 13.8m) and is listed on the Guinness Book of World Records. The auditorium has a 4K dual laser/shaker system, Dolby 136 sound package, and seating prices vary based on format and premiums.	· World Tower	
SUPER PLEX	A brand of theaters with wide sized screens with Dolby 360 sound systems and 6P laser projection.	· Dongtan · Eunpyung · Gwangbok · Suwon · Gwangmyung Outlet · Paju Unjung · Suji · Sang-in · Wonju Musil · Cheongju Yongam · MBCine	
SUPER S	World's first LED screen cinema with LED screens from Samsung and surround sound by Harman.	· Cheonan Buldang · World Tower · Konkuk Uni · Centum City	
CHARLOTTE	Premium format based on first-class services including exclusive lounge, complimentary food and beverages, and concierge services.	· World Tower · Dongtan · Konkuk Uni · Avenuel · Gimpo Airport · Ansan · Pyungchon · Gwangju · Dongsung-ro · Gwangbok · Centum City	
COLORIUM	Largest LED screen in Korea (14 meters) with Harman JBL surround sound, recliner chairs, and theater exclusive introductory laser performance.	· Suwon	
SUPER 4D	Branded theaters featuring 4D effects including wind, lighting, bubbles, fog, scents, water, and chair motion/vibrations.	· World Tower · Gasan Digital · Gwangbok · Nowon · Suh Cheongju · Suwan · Suwon · Ulsan · Cheongryangri · Pyungchon	
CINE FAMILY	Branded theaters with private booths for family viewing	· World Tower · Cheonan · Cheongdang	
CINE BIZ	Branded theaters that are customized for business presentations with multiple tables, stage, lighting system, and projection system.	· World Tower · Seo Cheongju · Anyang ·Daegu Yulha	

== International markets ==
Lotte Cinema opened its first overseas multiplex in Vietnam in 2008. The company now operates 46 theaters in Vietnam with 219 screens.

In 2010, Lotte Cinema China opened in Shenyang and grew operations to 9 theaters spanning 67 screens. However, the company exited China's market in 2022 due to business structure complexities.

In total, Lotte Cinema manages 198 sites with 1,128 screens worldwide.

== Issues ==
On June 5, 2021, Lotte Cinema held an eco-friendly event to celebrate 'Environmental Day'. It is an event that fills the multi-use food containers brought by customers with popcorn. However, as some customers buy unnecessary plastic (ex. large containers), Lotte Cinema's event is criticized for being out of the essence.

== See also ==
- CJ CGV, Lotte's main competitor in movie theatre industry
- Megabox is a chain of movie theaters in South Korea.
