= Lotte Department Store =

South Korean department store chain

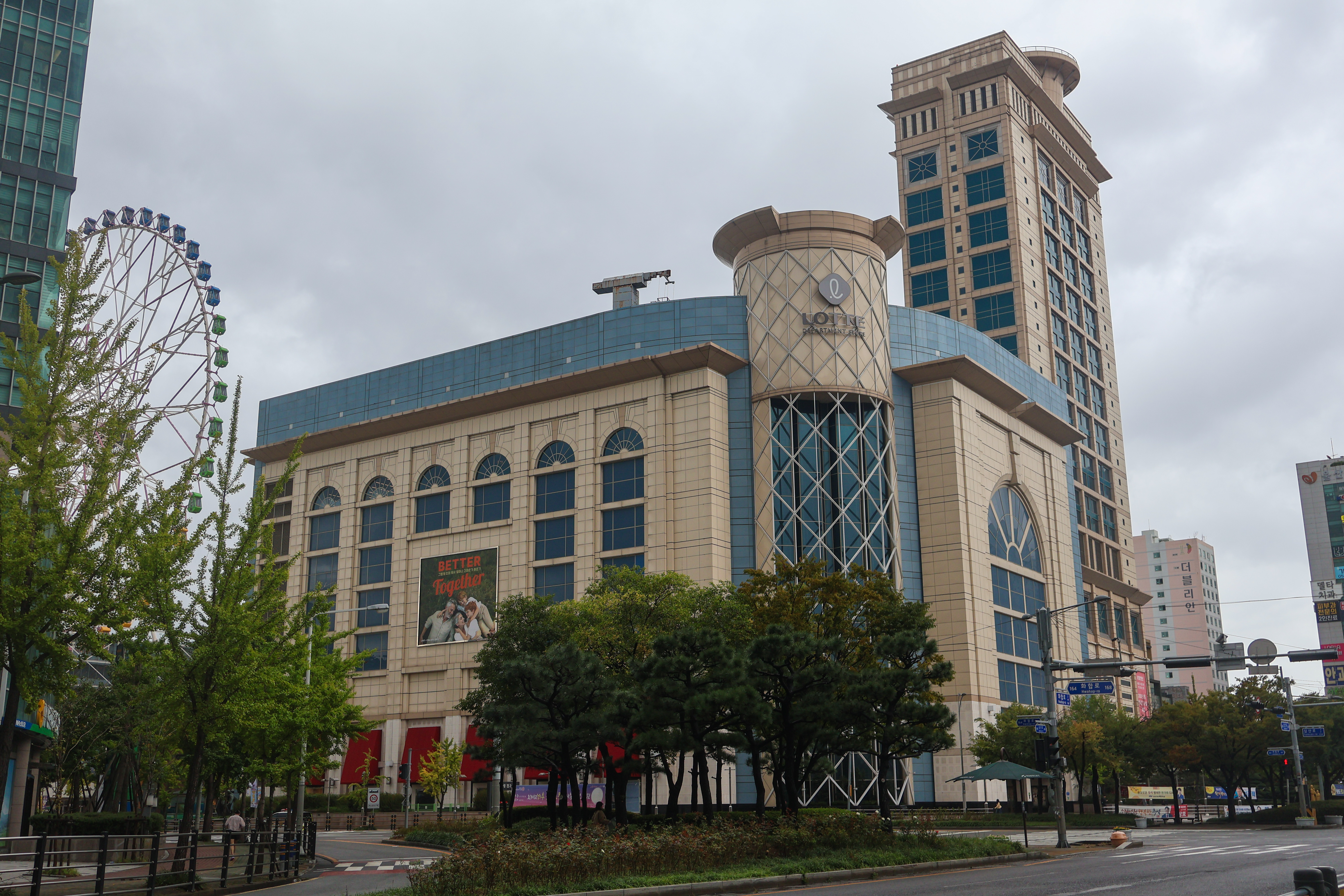
- Ulsan Branch
- Company type: Division
- Founded: November 15, 1979
- Founder: Shin Kyuk-Ho
- Headquarters: Seoul, South Korea
- Area served: South Korea, Russia, Indonesia, Vietnam
- Parent: Lotte Shopping
- Website: global.lotteshopping.com

Lotte Department Store (Korean: 롯데백화점 및 롯데홈쇼핑; Hanja: 롯데百貨店) is a Korean retail company established in 1979, and headquartered in Sogong-dong, Jung-gu, Seoul, South Korea. Lotte Department Store offers retail consumer goods and services and is one out of 8 business units of Lotte Shopping. Other Lotte retail companies include discount store Lotte Mart and supermarket Lotte Super.

Lotte Department Store said October 24, 2024 it will invest 7 trillion won (US$5.06 billion) in shopping malls by 2030 as it seeks to diversify its business portfolios.

== See also ==
- Chôsen Industrial Bank
