= Minard Castle =

Castellated mansion in Argyll and Bute, Scotland

Coordinates: 56°5′52.53″N 5°15′34.81″W

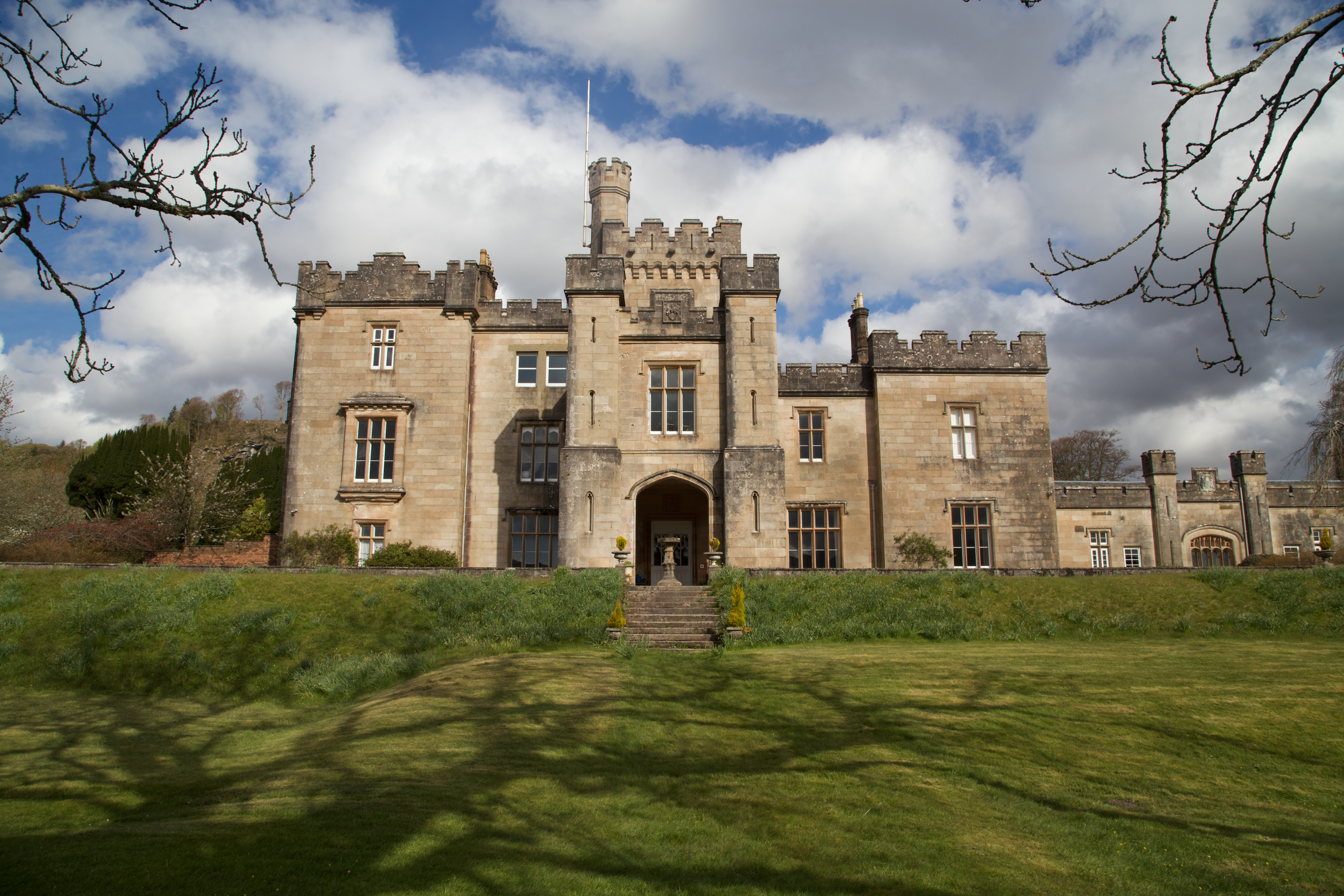
- Minard Castle from the South East

Site history
- Built: 19th century

Minard Castle is a 19th-century castellated mansion on the north-western shore of Loch Fyne Argyll and Bute, on the west coast of Scotland, in the parish of Kilmichael Glassary.

The castle is located slightly south of the village of Minard. The current structure is the enlargement of an older house carried out around 1848 by the architect John Thomas Rochead.

== History ==
Minard Castle and estate was built to the south of Minard Bay, which itself is south of the village of Minard, on the headland of Minard Point. Minard Castle dates from the 18th century, when it was built by the Campbell family as Knockbuie House and renamed Minard Castle in the mid-nineteenth century, when a new castellated front was added. The house was reconstructed as a Tudor Revival style of mansion in 1842 by John Thomas Rochead. In 1850, William Hamilton extended the house, adding a facade consisting of a number of large rooms to the front of the old mansion. Later, the house was sold to the Scottish submarine communications cable pioneer, John Pender. In the 20th century. It was later sold to the Forestry Commission in the late 1940s and then to the Holiday Fellowship, who used it as a hotel for many years.

== See also ==
- Castle website

Media related to Minard Castle (Scotland) at Wikimedia Commons
