= Menard =

Menard may refer to:

== Places ==
=== Canada ===
- Menard River, a tributary of the Wawagosic River in Quebec, Canada

=== United States ===
- Menard County, Illinois
  - Menard, Illinois
- Menard County, Texas
  - Menard, Texas
- Menard–Hodges site, archaeological site in Arkansas
- Pierre Menard Home State Historic Site, historic park in Illinois
  - Pierre Menard House, 1810 French Creole-style home of Pierre Menard

== People ==
- Menard (surname)

=== Fictional characters ===
- Pierre Menard (fictional character), a fictional writer in the story "Pierre Menard, Author of the Quixote"

== Organizations ==
- Menard Press, small press publisher founded in 1969
- Menard Independent School District, Menard, Texas
- Menard Correctional Center, a maximum and high-medium security prison in Illinois
- Team Menard, John Menard, Jr.'s Indy Racing League team
- Menard Art Museum, Komaki, Aichi, central Japan

== Other uses ==
- "Pierre Menard, Author of the Quixote", short story by Argentine writer Jorge Luis Borges

== See also ==
- Menards, chain of home improvement stores in the Midwestern United States
- Ménard (disambiguation)
- Menear, surname
