= Lotte Shopping =

Korean multinational retailer (e. 1979)

Lotte Shopping Co., Ltd.
- Native name: 롯데쇼핑 주식회사
- Type: Public
- Traded as: KRX: 023530
- Industry: Retail
- Founded: 1979; 47 years ago
- Headquarters: Seoul, South Korea
- Parent: Lotte Corporation
- Divisions: Lotte Department Store; Lotte Mart
- Subsidiaries: Lotte Cultureworks; Lotte Hi-Mart
- Website: www.lotteshoppingir.com

Lotte Shopping Co., Ltd. (Korean: 롯데쇼핑 주식회사), a distribution unit of Lotte Group, is a multinational retailer headquartered in Seoul, South Korea. Founded in 1979, Lotte Shopping operates various retail stores, including department stores, outlet stores, hypermarkets, drug store chains, and e-commerce. It is also engaged in the film industry by holding the majority of its stake in Lotte Cultureworks.

== Businesses ==
Lotte Shopping's primary business divisions and subsidiaries include:

Business divisions

- Lotte Department Store
- Lotte Mart
- Lotte Super

Subsidiaries

- Lotte Homeshopping
- Lotte Cultureworks
- Lotte Hi-Mart

Lotte Shopping operates Korea's largest department store chain and the second-largest hypermarket chain in Korea. Lotte runs a home appliance retailer by acquiring Hi-Mart for 1.25 trillion won in 2012. Hi-Mart was the nation's top consumer electronics retailer, with 314 stores. Lotte Shopping also had the multiplex cinema chain Lotte Cinema under its wing but decided to spin off the cinema business department as a subsidiary, Lotte Cultureworks, in 2018.

Lotte Shopping also runs its retail business in the Southeast Asian market, including Vietnam and Indonesia. Lotte Shopping once operated five department stores and 99 discount stores in the mainland China market. However, after South Korea deployed THAAD in a golf course owned by the Lotte Group, the company withdrew its retail business from China as it failed to recover from a boycott campaign.

== Gallery ==
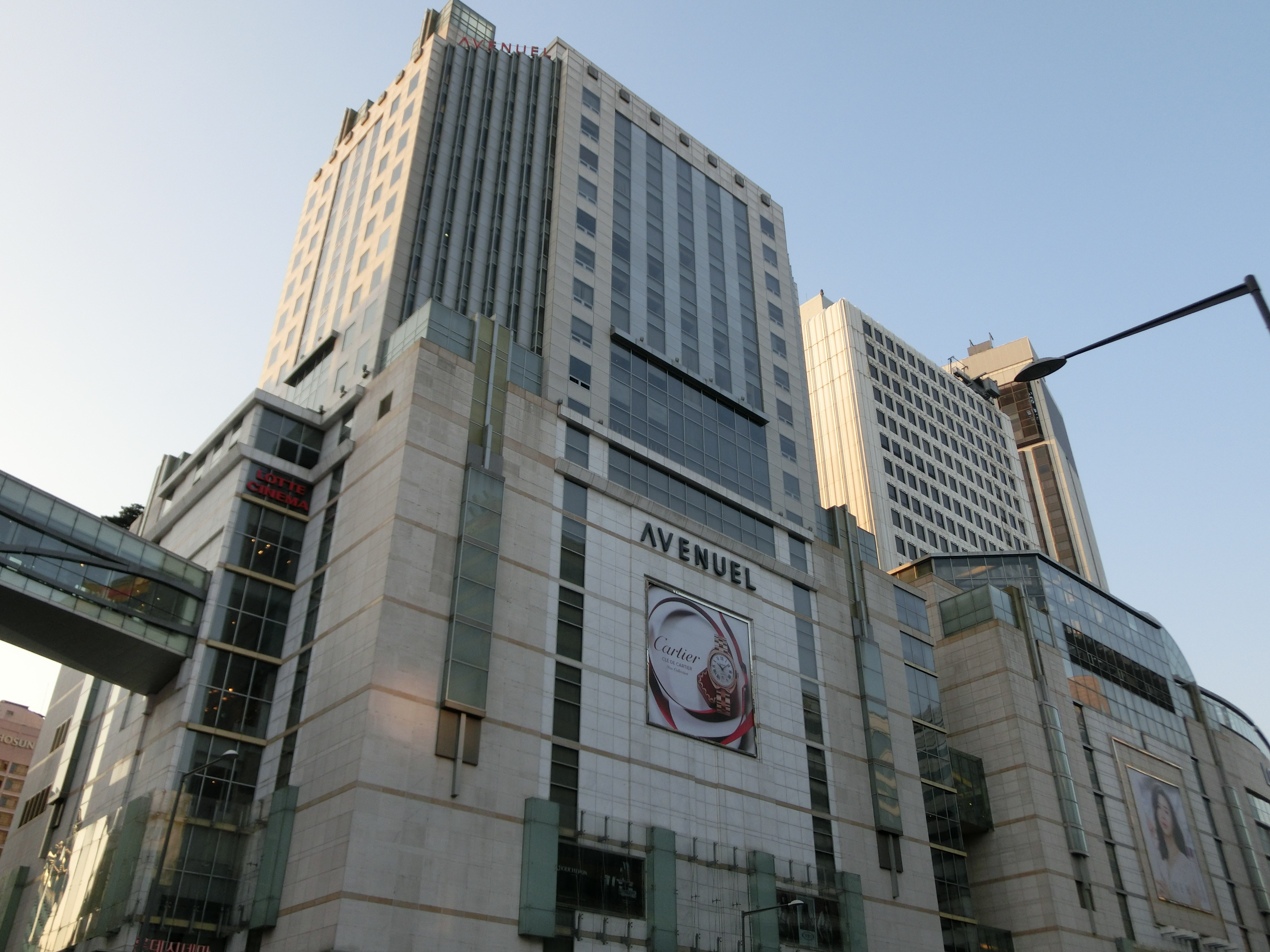
Lotte Department Main Store in Seoul

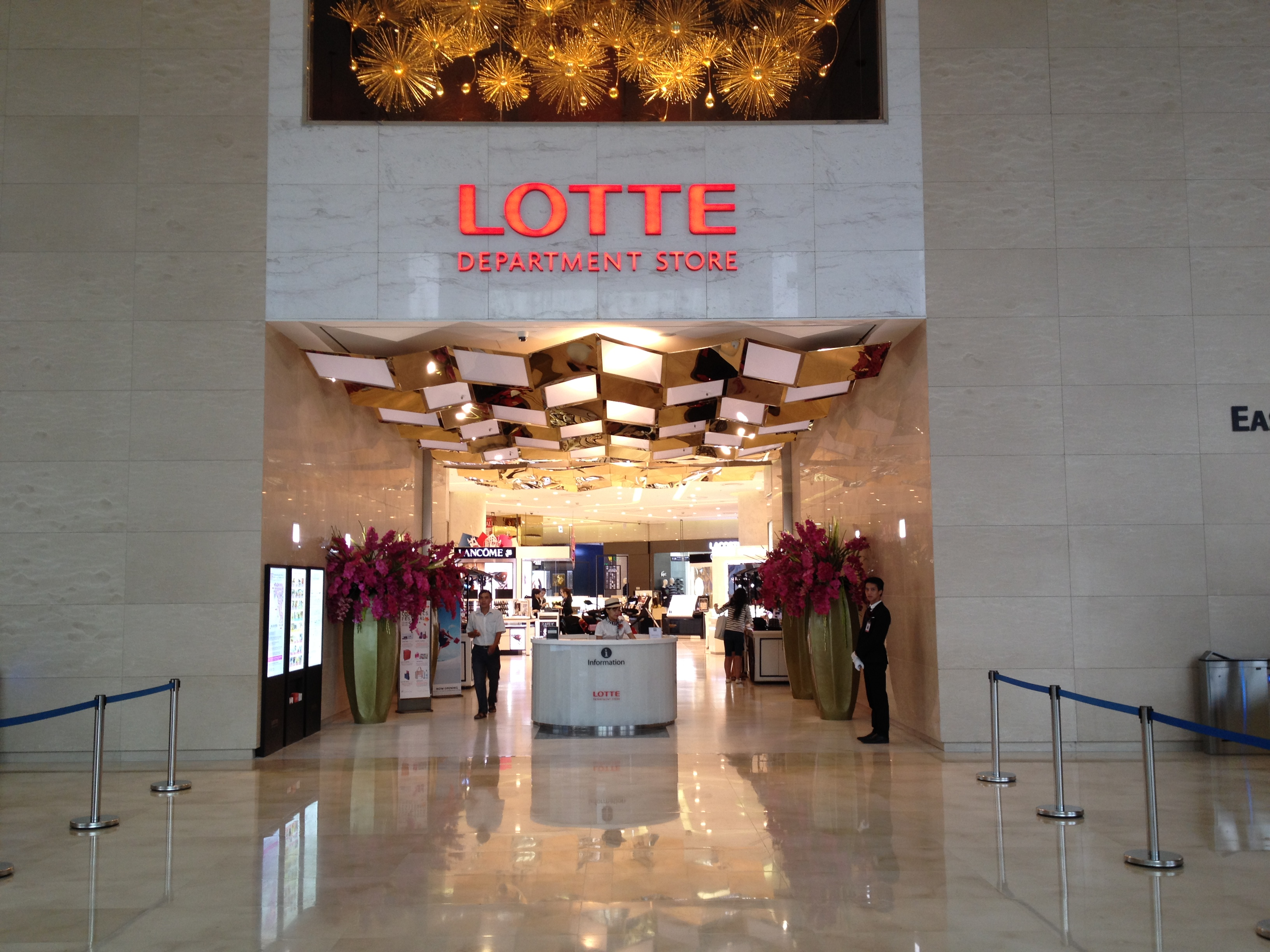
Lotte Department Store in Hanoi

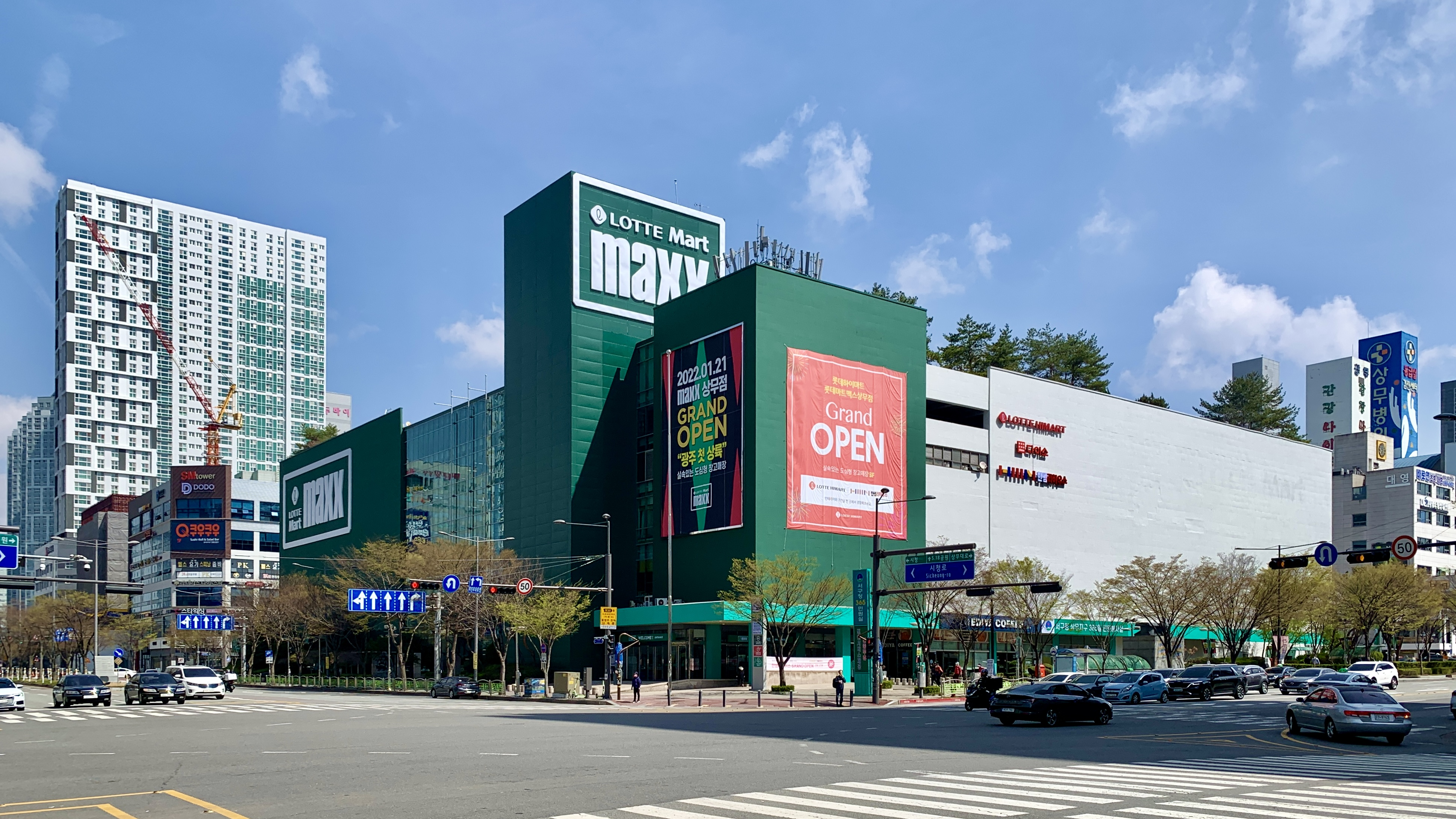
Lotte Mart in Gwangju

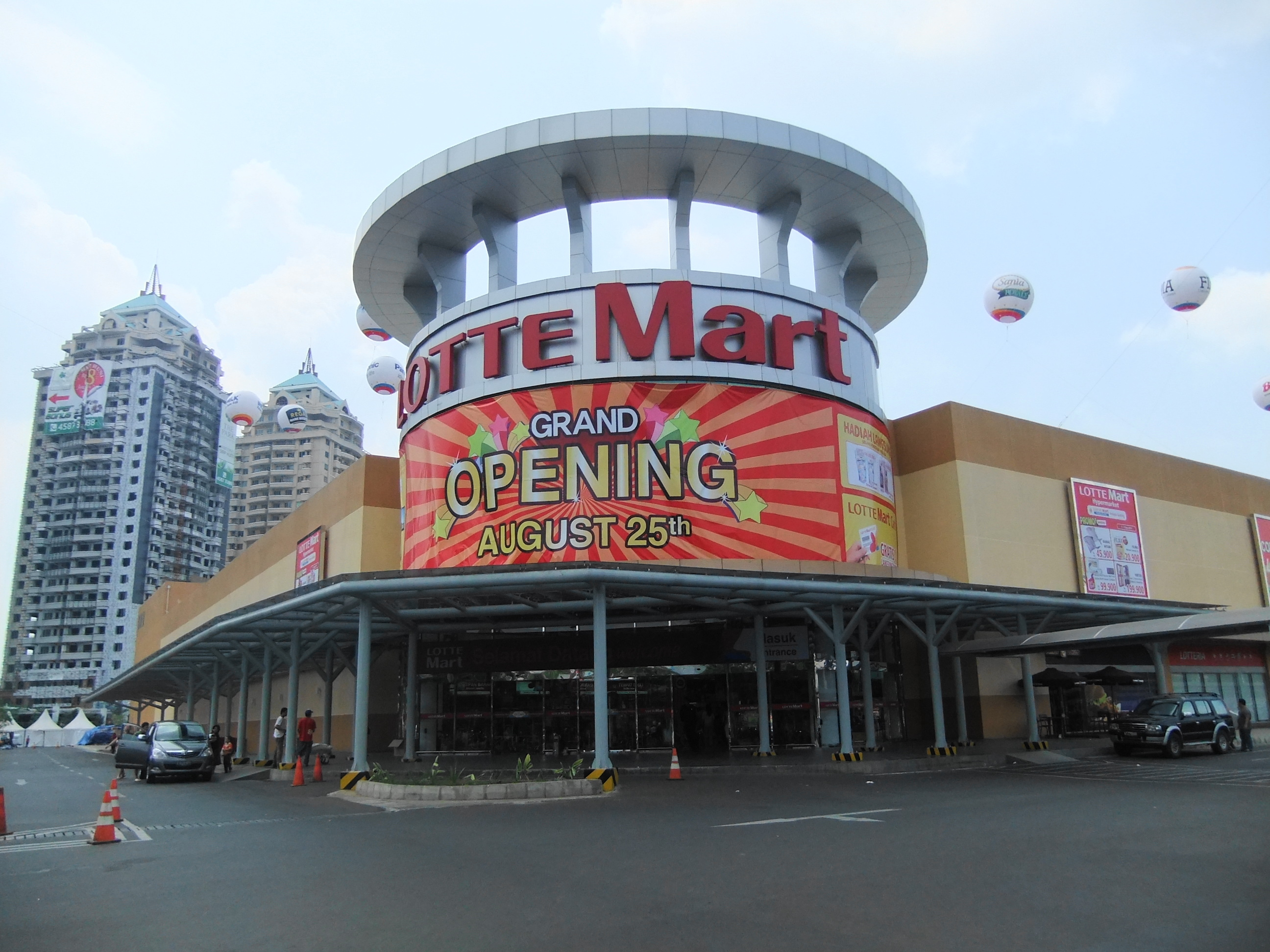
Lotte Mart in Jakarta

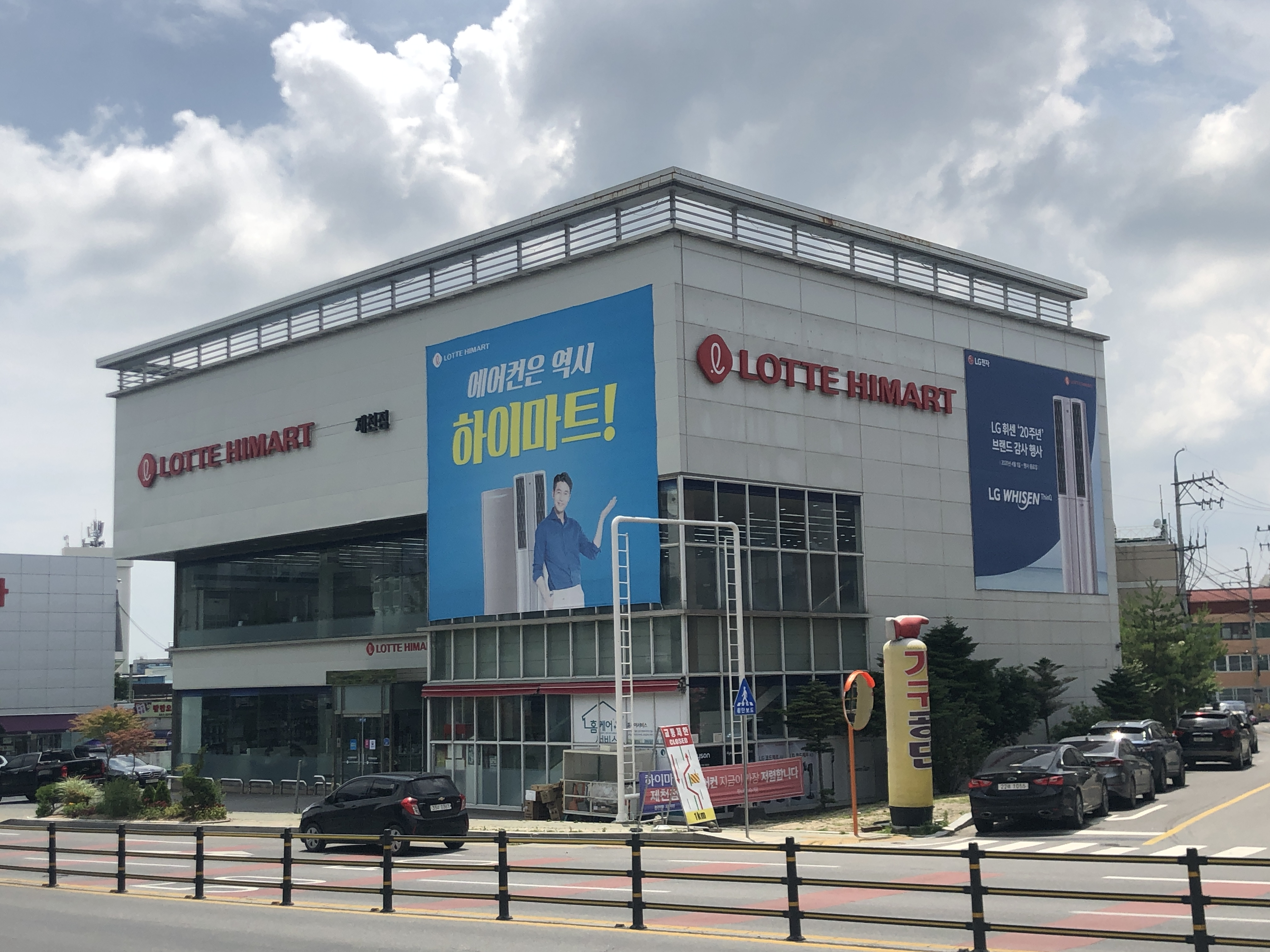
Lotte Hi-Mart in Jecheon

== See also ==
- List of largest companies of South Korea
- China–South Korea relations
