= Vincom Center Đồng Khởi =

Building in Ho Chi Minh City, Vietnam

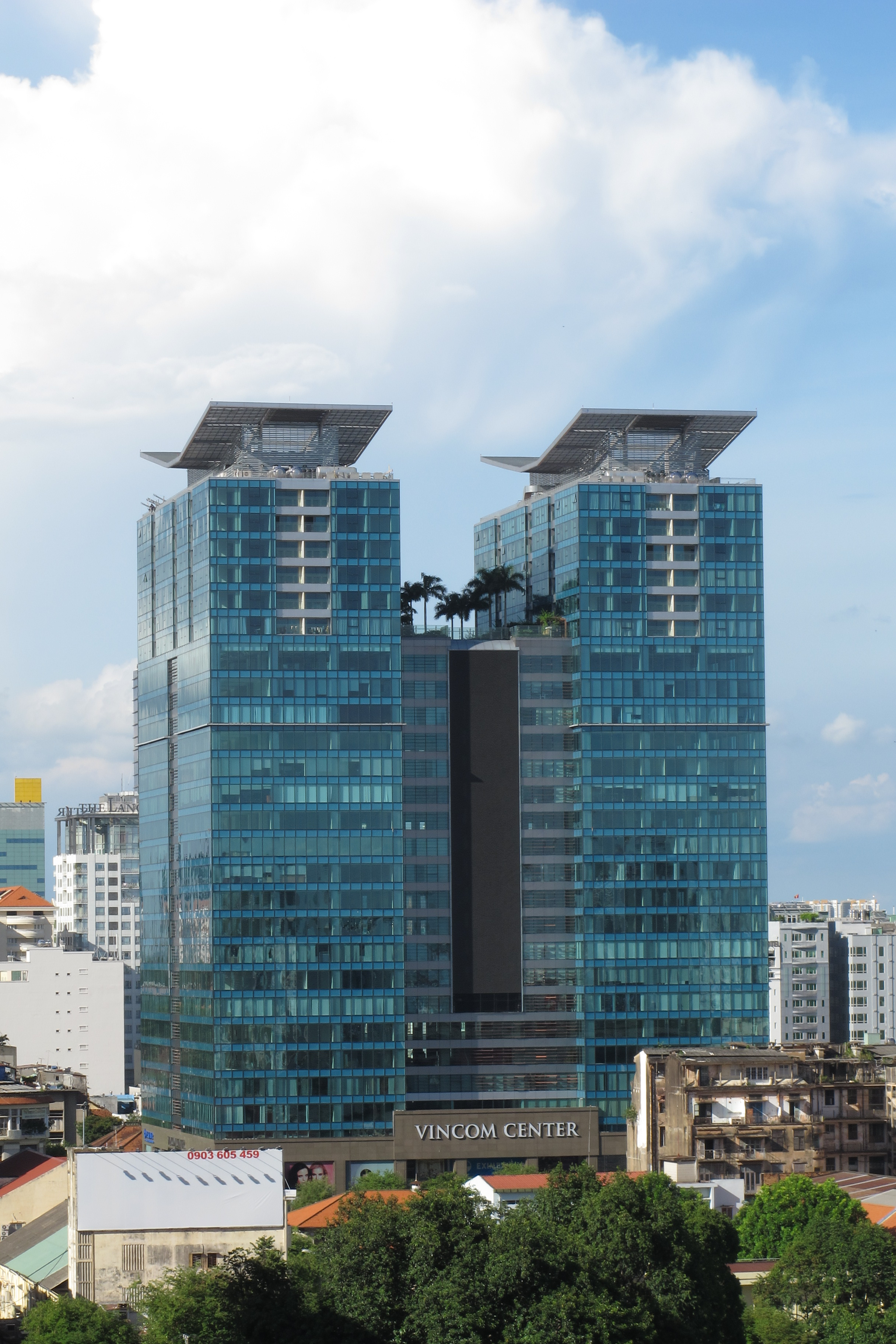
- Vincom Center B in 2013
- Former names: Vincom Center B
- Alternative names: Vincom Twin Tower, Vincom Center Tower, Vincom Center HCM, Vinhomes Đồng Khởi

General information
- Status: Completed
- Type: Office building, shopping mall, apartment
- Location: Chi Lăng Park Entrance: 156 Đồng Khởi Street; East Entrance: 70–72 Lê Thánh Tôn Street; West Entrance 45–45A–47 Lý Tự Trọng Street, Saigon, District 1, Ho Chi Minh City, Vietnam
- Construction started: Late 2009
- Opened: April 30, 2010; 16 years ago

Height
- Height: 115 m (377 ft)
- Top floor: 26

Technical details
- Floor count: 28 (+6 Basements)
- Lifts/elevators: 16

Design and construction
- Developer: Vingroup

Other information
- Parking: 40,000 m^{2} (430,000 sq ft) (B4, B5, B6)
- Public transit: L1 Opera House station

Website
- Vincom Center Đồng Khởi

Vincom Center Đồng Khởi, originally known as Vincom Center B, is a mixed-use twin buildings of a same name shopping mall, office space tenant area and apartment on the five upper levels of the building (except the mechanical penthouse) invested and developed by Vingroup. It is located in Ho Chi Minh City central area formerly known as District 1, Ho Chi Minh City, Vietnam.

== History ==
On June 21, 2007, Vincom (now is Vingroup) announced a project that high-rise and real estate investors have been "half-believing, half-doubting" about for nearly a year now. It is a cluster of 3 towers invested by Vincom, divided into two lots, including an office complex, luxury apartments for rent, a 5-star hotel and a commercial center, located in the center of District 1, Ho Chi Minh City.

The first lot of nearly 12,000 m^{2} will be located at the current location of the Ho Chi Minh City Department of Education & Training and Chi Lăng Park, which is originally known as Vincom Center B, including a commercial center, offices and luxury apartments, a long-term rental garage and a parking lot. The upper part of the first lot will be two 28-storey towers with a total area of 110,000 m^{2}, one for apartments and the other for offices for rent. These two towers will share a base, used as a commercial center and parking lot. The second lot of the project has an area of 8,800 m^{2}, located at the former Eden Commercial Center, surrounded by 4 main streets: Nguyễn Huệ Boulevard, Đồng Khởi Street, Lê Lợi Boulevard and Lê Thánh Tôn Street.

Vincom Center B was started to construct in late 2009, then opened on April 30, 2010, to celebrate the 35th anniversary of the Reunification Day. Vincom Center B was secretly renamed as Vincom Center Đồng Khởi after the Vincom Center A was sold for VIPD Group (a business related to Trương Mỹ Lan) and changed as Union Square Saigon, the name was kept until now.

=== Criticism ===
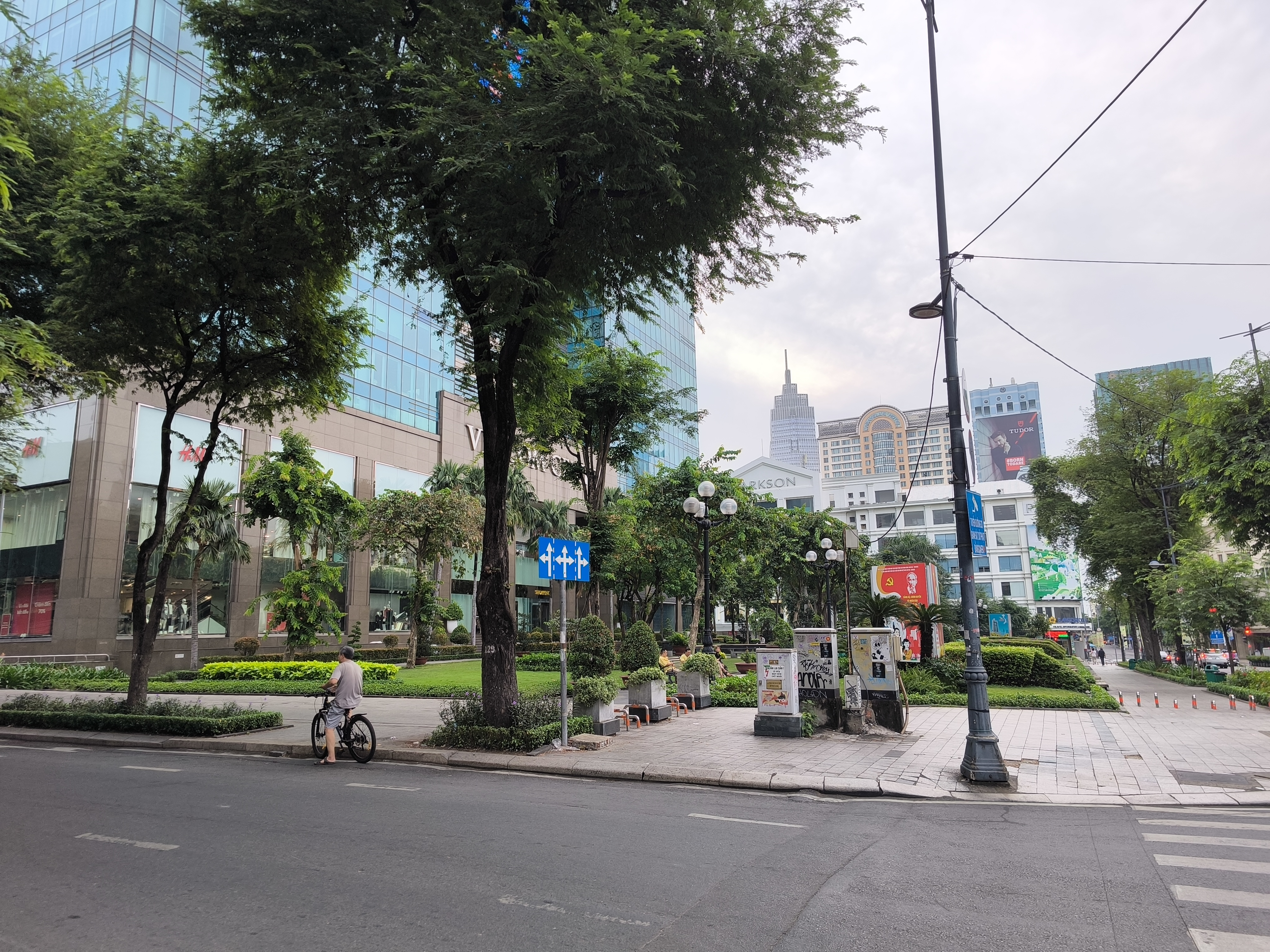
Chi Lăng Park and Vincom Center on Đồng Khởi Street, towards Bạch Đằng Quay in 2023

The location of the Vincom Center Đồng Khởi on the plot of Chi Lăng Park and the Ho Chi Minh City Department of Education & Training has received many criticisms, mainly focusing on the transparency of the land allocation process. Specifically, public opinion and experts expressed concerns that the city seemed to have favored the appointment of the investor without organizing a public, competitive bidding as prescribed. This led to skepticism about group interests and the ineffective use of "golden" public land resources.

In addition, the transformation of almost the whole Chi Lăng park, a long time public space, into a massive commercial complex and the rest of the park accidentally became a "frontyard" of the complex was also criticized for increasing pressure on the central area's traffic infrastructure and changing the city's historical landscape.

== Features ==
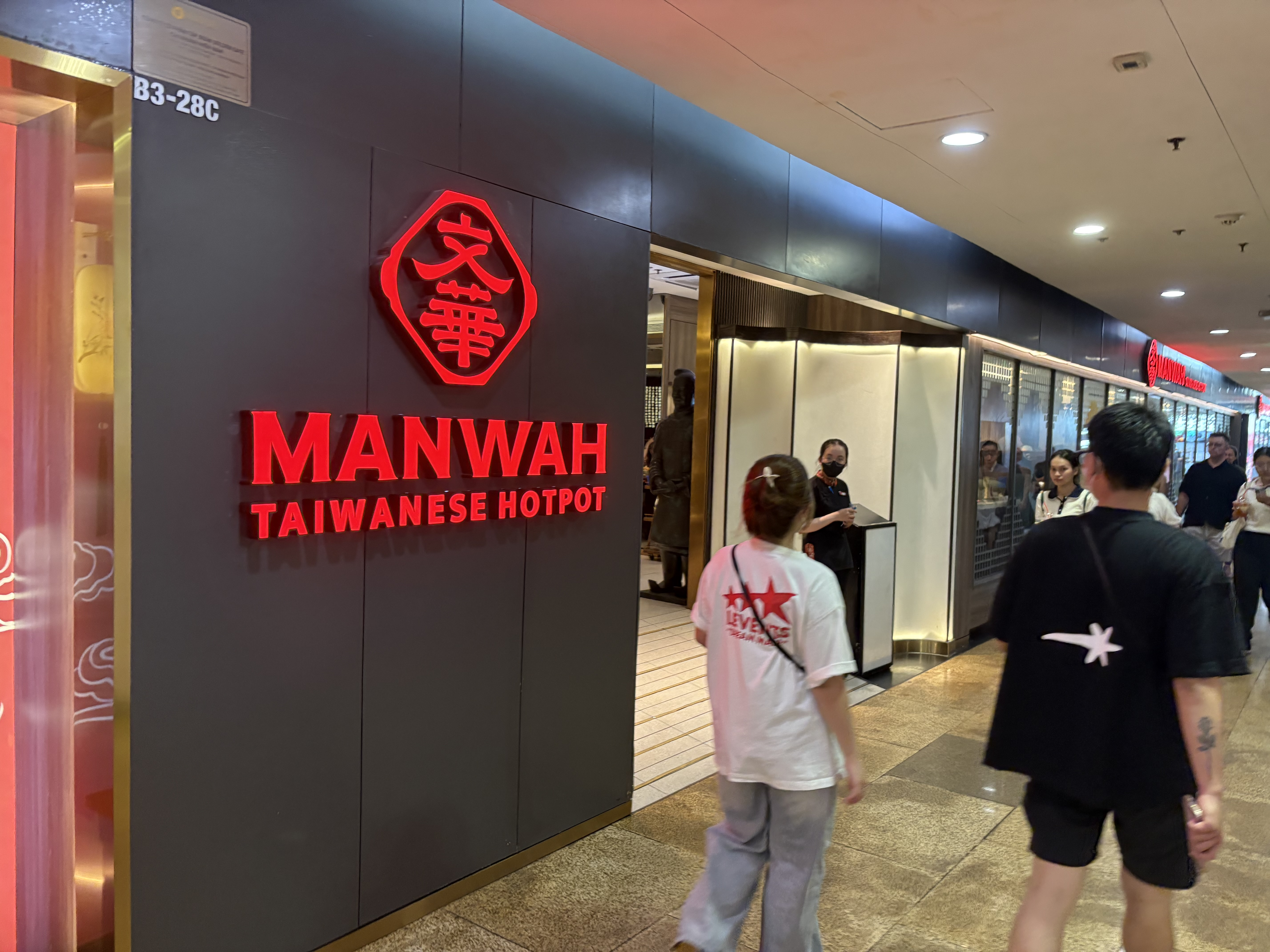
Manwah Taiwanese Hotpot in Vincom Center Đồng Khởi

The building is including two blocks called Tower A and B, both are connected by a 20-level podium, on top of the podium, also the level 21 of Tower A and B, is a swimming pool for residents of Vinhomes Đồng Khởi. List of the building features:

| Level | Use | Tenants |
|---|---|---|
| 27 | Mechanical penthouse | – |
| 21–26 | Vinhomes Đồng Khởi | – |
| 4–20 | Vincom Center Office Tower | Notable tenants: Eximbank, AIA Group, Maybank Kim Eng, Hong Kong Airlines, Ho Chi Minh City Branch of Vincom Retail, Consulate General of Australia, Ho Chi Minh City |
| 3 | Vincom Center Đồng Khởi Mall | Dessert planet, Haidilao, King BBQ Buffet, Dookki, Xing Fu Tang, CJ CGV Cinema, Elite Fitness, Coway |
| 2 | Vincom Center Đồng Khởi Mall | H&M, HLA, New Balance, Pull&Bear, Stradivarius |
| 1–M | Vincom Center Đồng Khởi Mall | Lacoste, Levi's, MLB, Polo Ralph Lauren, Tommy Hilfiger, Wilson, Cobra Puma Golf, Zara, Fred Perry, Karl Lagerfeld, Massimo Dutti, Victoria's Secret, Longines, Pandora, Swarovski, Sony |
| B1 | Vincom Center Đồng Khởi Mall | Adidas Originals, Calvin Klein, Cotton:On, GAP, GiGi, Guess, Nike, Nike Rise, The New Playground, Skechers, Wilson, Cobra Puma Golf, Urban Revivo, Charles & Keith, Crocs, Havaianas, Lyn, Pedro, Long Beach Pearl, LukFook, Mujosh, Mắt Việt, Owndays, PNJ, Thế Giới Kim Cương, Cara , Prima Art, Titan-Fossil-Daniel, Wellington, Vàng Tuyết Kiều, Dyson, Fixi Foot |
| B2 | Vincom Center Đồng Khởi Mall | Adidas, An Phước, Aristino, Giordano, Gustavo Gano, Li-Ning, Valentino Creations, Vincy, RuNam Bistro, Starbucks, ECCO, Puccini, Samsonite, Seha Accessories, Messyweekend, Copenhagen Delights, Tutto Piccolo, Mykingdom Toy Store, Amara Home, LIZD NaMat, Honee Coffee, Minigood, Face Fash Fox |
| B3 | Vincom Center Đồng Khởi Mall | Basta Hiro, Beard Papa's, BKK Street Dessert, Boat Noodle, Boost Juice, BreadTalk, Chilli Thai, Chang Kang Kung, Cơm Tấm Mộc, Cộng Cà Phê, Dahu Hotpot, Dì Mai – Vietnamese Restaurant, Dookki, Gogi House, Golden Dynasty, Hachiban, Highlands Coffee, Hachiban Ramen, Hokkaido Sachi, Kichi Kichi, King BBQ À la carte, Kohaku Udon & Sushi, KOI Thé, Long Wang, Manwah Taiwanese Hotpot, Mochi Sweets, San Fu Lou, Som Tum Thai, Matsuya, Morico, Pang Pang, Tian Long – Teochew fresh beef hotpot, The Matcha Tokyo, Tous les Jours, Wrap&Roll, Yakiniku Like, WinMart Đồng Khởi |
| B4–B6 | Parking | – |

=== Notes ===
- Mezzanine is between Level 1 & 2, marked as M level
- Cosmetics and healcare tenants are mostly at Level 1 and B1, including: Bath & Body Works, Christian Dior, Clarins, Clé de Peau Beauté, Escentric Signatur, Estée Lauder, Kiehl's, Make Up For Ever, NARS, Shiseido, Sulwhasoo, The Body Shop, Thế Giới Nước Hoa, Watsons, Yves Saint Laurent, Bobbi Brown, Innisfree, Jo Malone, Lancôme, Letitia, Lush, MAC, Passiflores Beauty, Viin Riic Niche. Some at B2 are: Beauty Box, Cocolux, Himalaya, Matsumoto Kiyoshi, Scentuals
- Lobby for both office space and apartment, also VinFast store are located at Level 1

== Gallery ==
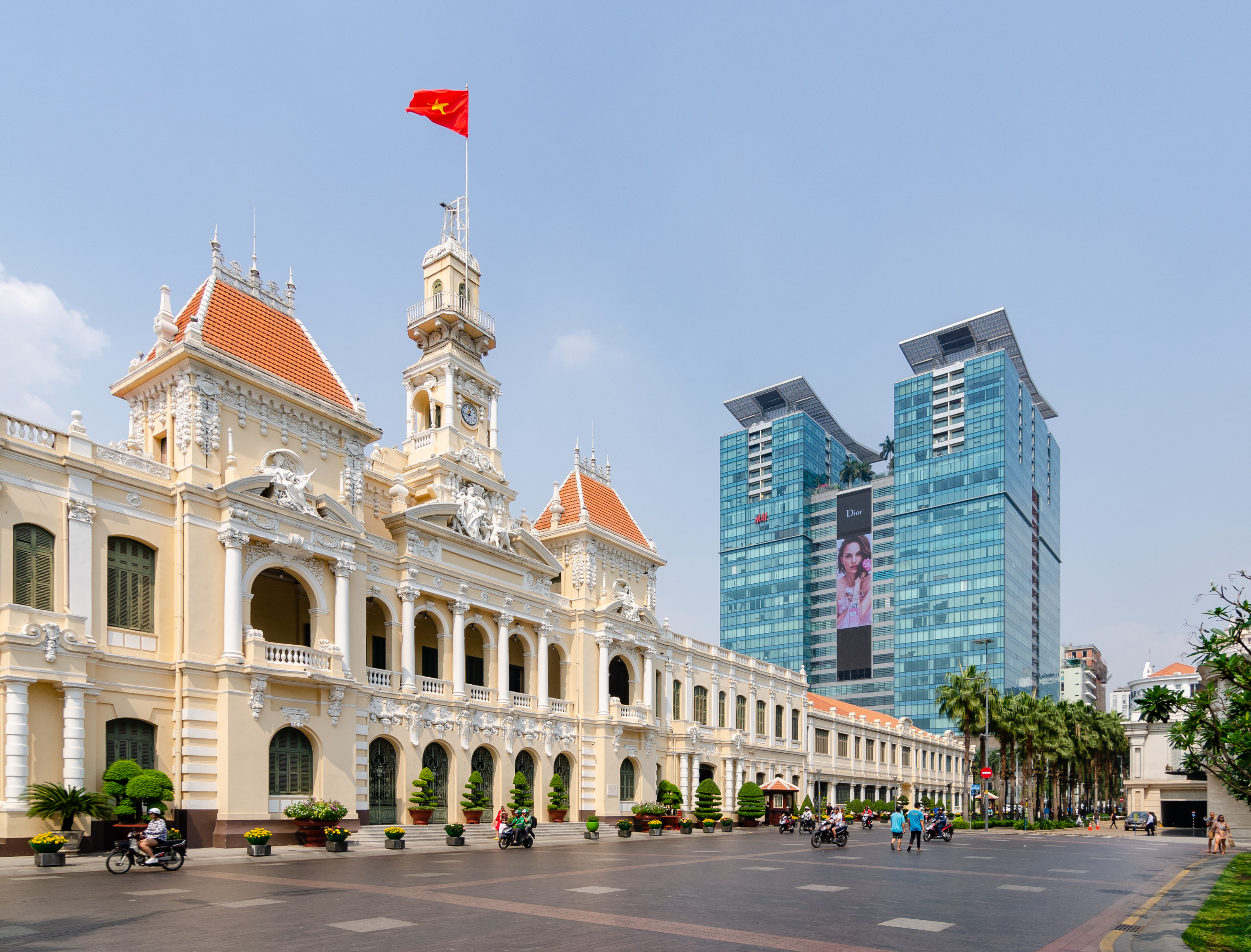
Vincom Center Đồng Khởi with Ho Chi Minh City Hall on Lê Thánh Tôn Street

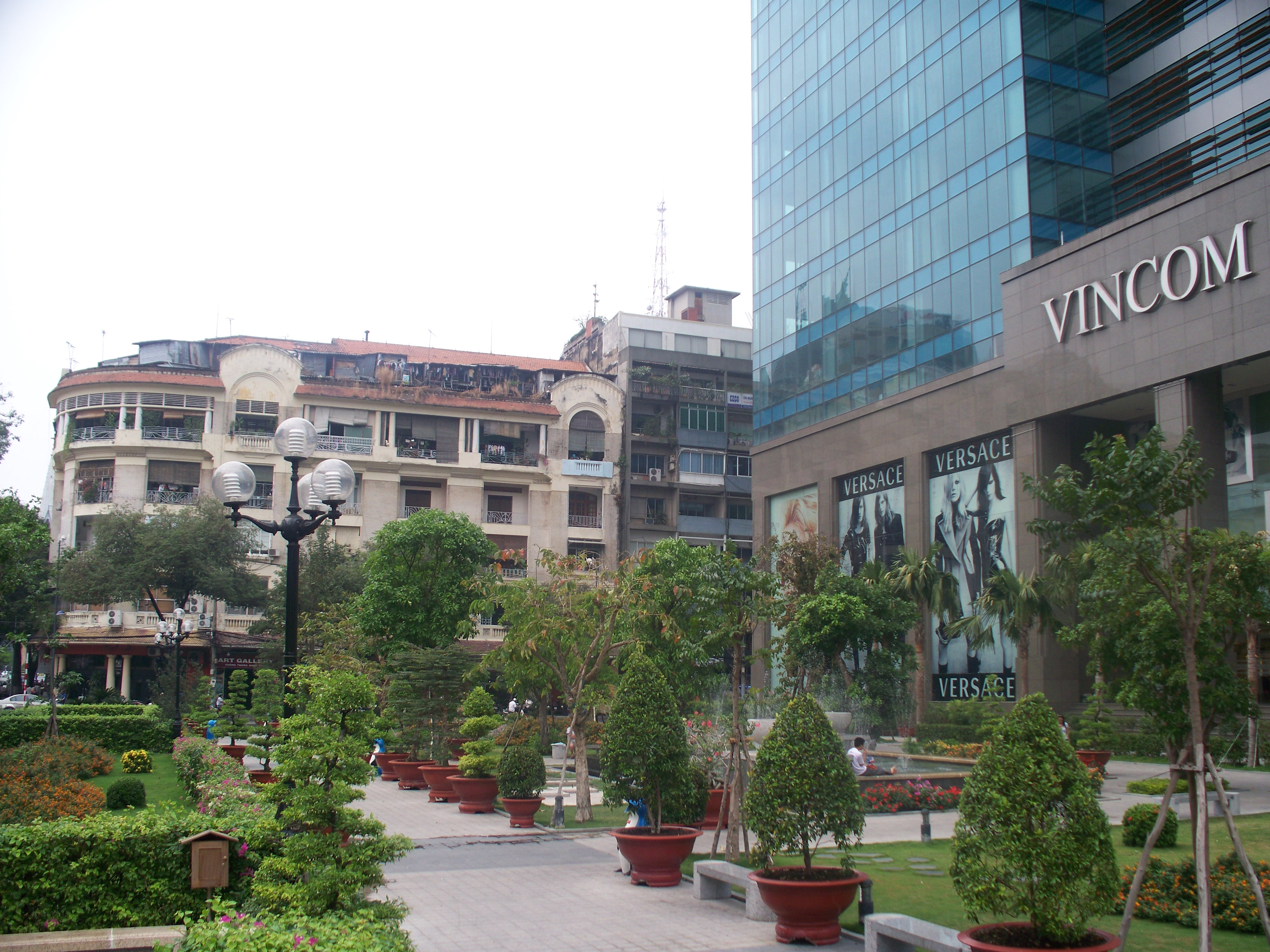
Vincom Center Đồng Khởi with 26 and 22 Gia Long Street buildings

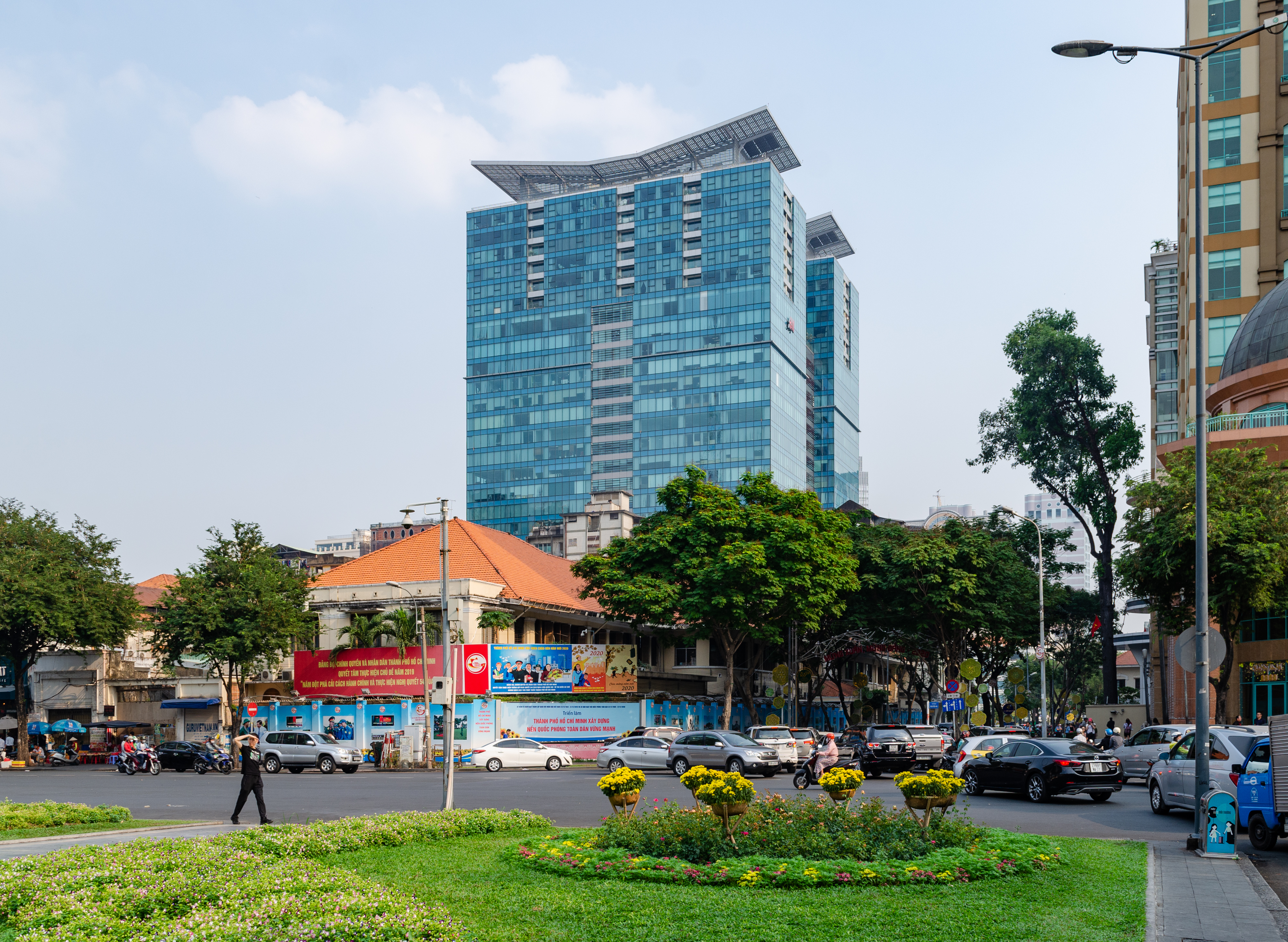
Vincom Center viewed from Paris Commune Square, frontyard of the Notre-Dame Cathedral Basilica of Saigon

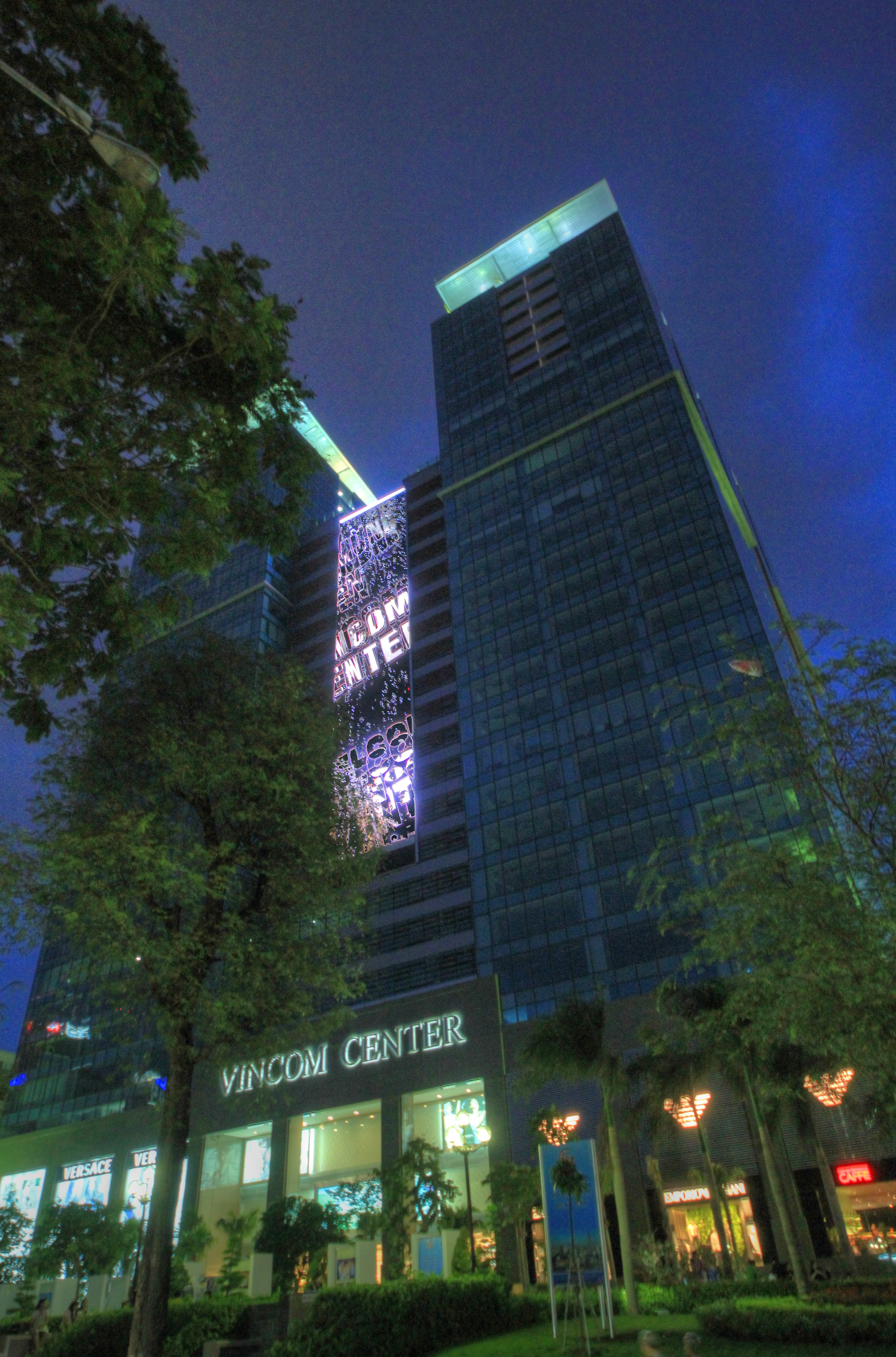
Vincom Center at night

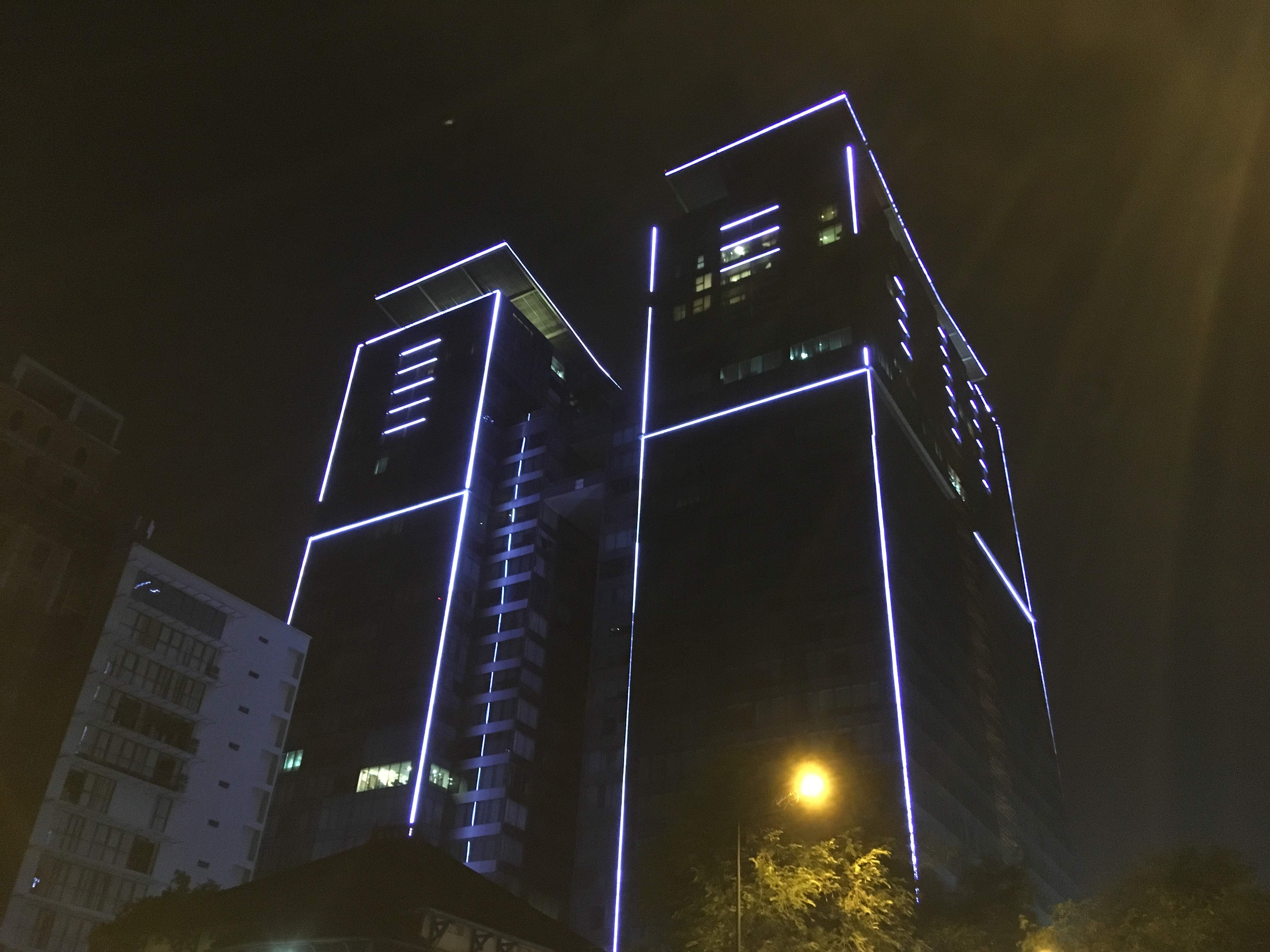
Vincom Center at night seen on Hai Bà Trưng Street in 2018

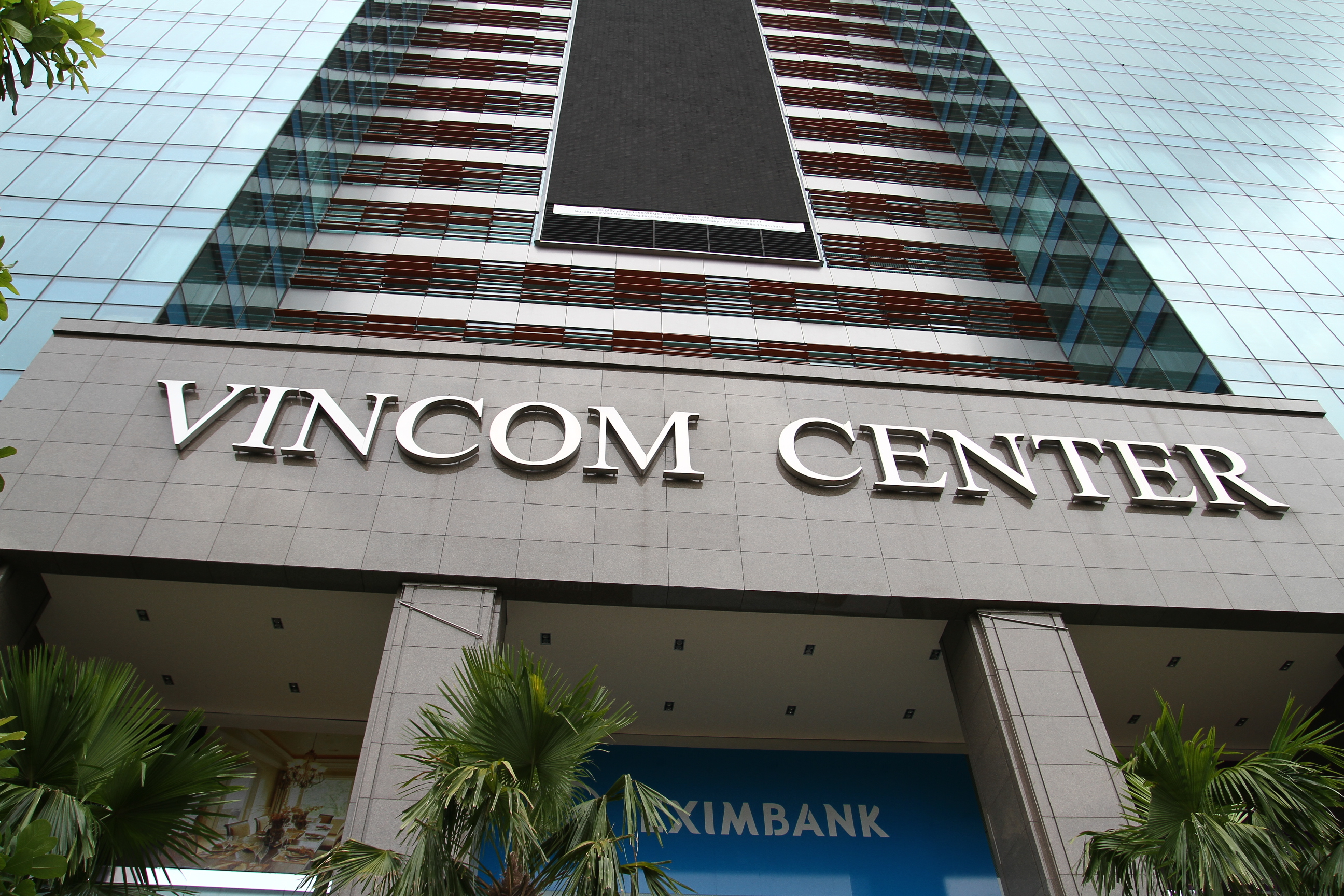
Vincom Center, Chi Lăng Park entrance with sign of Eximbank below

The 22 Lý Tự Trọng (Gia Long) building as seen in 2024, looking from the rear with Vincom Center in the background

== See also ==
- Landmark 81
- Saigon Centre
- Union Square Saigon
