= VinUniversity =

Private university in Hanoi, Vietnam

- Trường Đại học VinUniversity
- Type: Private
- Established: 2018
- Affiliations: Vingroup
- President: Lê Mai Lan
- Provost: Yap-peng Tan
- Students: 300 (inaugural year) - 3500 (at full capacity)
- Location: Vinhomes Ocean Park, Gia Lam, Hanoi, Vietnam; 20°59′21″N 105°56′37″E
- Campus: Urban 230,000 square metres (56.83 acres)
- Website: vinuni.edu.vn

VinUni (formally VinUniversity) (Vietnamese: Trường Đại học VinUni) is a Vietnamese private and nonprofit university located in Hanoi, Vietnam. It is the world's first higher education institution that has a one-word name. VinUni was established by Vingroup Corporation following the approval by the Vietnamese Prime Minister Nguyễn Xuân Phúc in March 2018. According to VinUni, its inaugural class of the academic year 2020-2021 will consist of about 300 students, whereas its full capacity would be at around 3500 students.

== History ==
In November 2017, Vingroup began its collaboration with the Cornell SC Johnson College of Business of Cornell University in order to explore the development of a new private university in Vietnam aiming at QS 5-star rating standard. According to Cornell, it would be in charge of the creation of the initial leadership and faculty for VinUni from its own faculty members, as well as the examination and validation of the quality of curricula developed by VinUni. Expanding this initiative, in April 2018 Vingroup signed a strategic collaboration and strategic alliance with Cornell and another Ivy League member - University of Pennsylvania, which agreed with supporting the VinUniversity Project with the development of its undergraduate and graduate medical training programs. A year later, dean of external relations at the SC Johnson College of Business Professor Rohit Verma was appointed to be the founding provost of VinUni in April 2018.

Along with the creation of strategic partnership with Cornell and UPenn, Vingroup also proceeded with the administrative and physical foundations for the VinUni Project by successfully applying for an approvals of establishment and operation by the Government of Vietnam in March 2018 and December 2019 respectively, and beginning the construction of the VinUni campus in November 2018. On 15 January 2020, this main campus of VinUniversity was officially inaugurated at the Opening Ceremony with the presence of the Deputy Prime Minister Vũ Đức Đam and Minister of Education and Training Phùng Xuân Nhạ. After two years in operation, it received 5-Star QS (Quacquarelli Symonds) ratings in seven categories.

== Campus ==
VinUniversity Campus is located in Vinhomes Ocean Park - a 420-ha residential area newly established by Vingroup in Gia Lâm District of Hanoi. After the ground-breaking ceremony in November 2018, it took Vingroup only one year and two months to complete the first phase of the campus over an area of 230,000 square metres (56.83 acres) at a cost of around 6,500 billion VND. Aside from classrooms, the office area, library, and laboratories, the main VinUni campus is also equipped with a 1,500-seat auditorium, a sport complex with swimming pool and facilities for various sports. In this initial phase, the 24/7 library of VinUni has a total area of 4,000 square metres (43,055.64 sq ft), which is sufficient for around 1,000 students concurrently. As a self-contained campus, VinUni Ocean Park Campus has separate dormitories for all freshmen, as well as for faculties, who will live and work alongside their students.

== Organization ==
VinUni is organized into 3 colleges with 9 programs in total, including:

College of Business and Management (CBM)	College of Health Sciences (CHS)	College of Engineering and Computer Science (CECS)	College of Arts and Science (CAS)
Bachelor of Business Administration	Bachelor of Nursing	Bachelor of Science in Mechanical Engineering	Bachelor of Arts in Psychology
Bachelor of Science in Hospitality Management	Doctor of Medicine	Bachelor of Science in Electrical Engineering	Bachelor of Arts in Multimedia Communication
Bachelor of Science in Real Estate		Bachelor of Science in Computer Science	Bachelor of Arts in Economics
		Bachelor of Science in Data Science	
Graduate degree program
	Internal Medicine	Masters of Innovation in AI	
	General Surgery	Ph.D. in Computer Science	
	Pediatrics		
	Orthopaedic		

== See also ==
- List of universities in Vietnam
- Education in Vietnam
