= Landmark 81 =

Supertall skyscraper in Ho Chi Minh City, Vietnam

Coordinates: 10°47′42″N 106°43′19″E

- Landmark 81
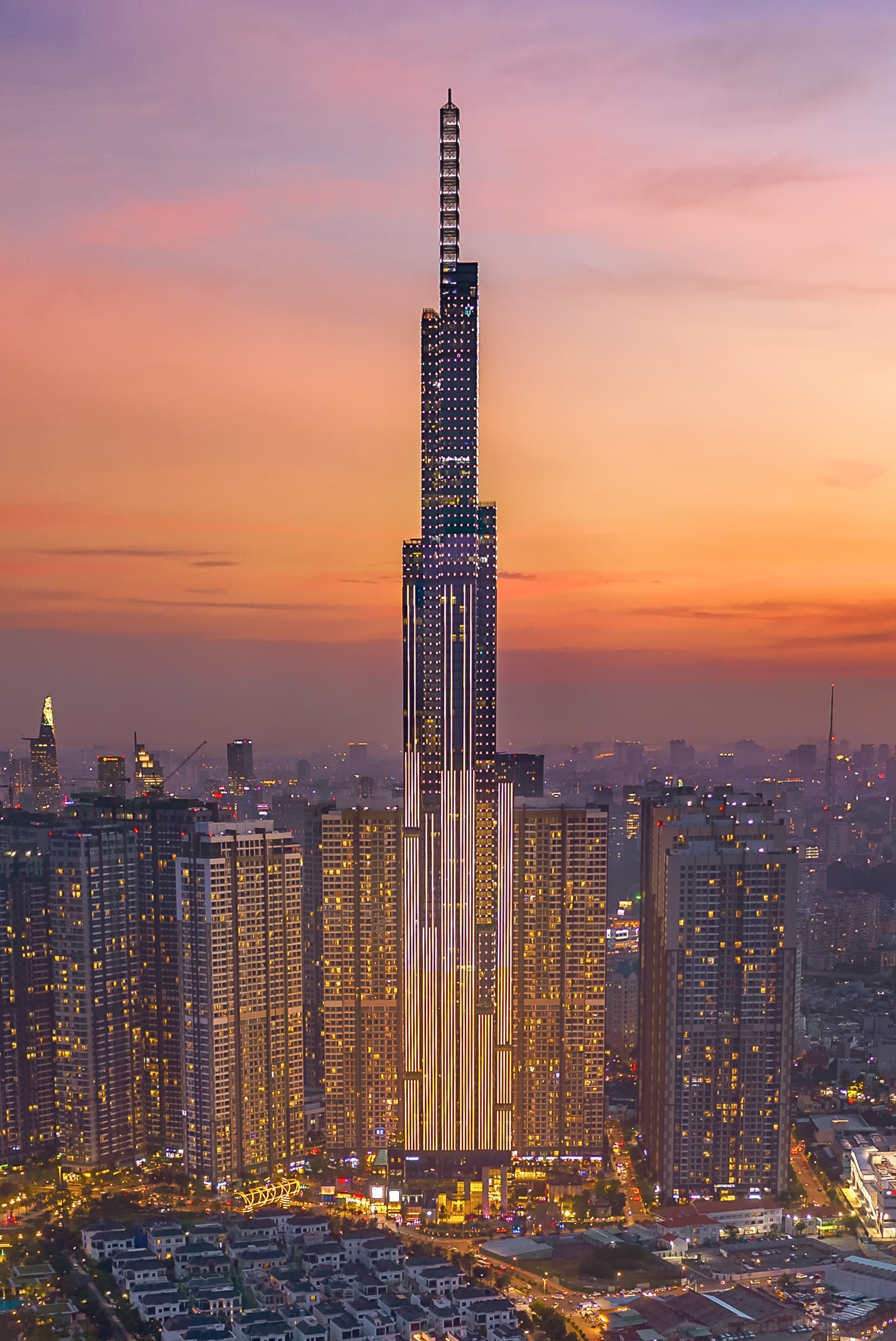
- Landmark 81 at dusk, 2019
- Alternative names: Vincom Center Landmark 81, The Landmark 81
- Hotel chain: Autograph Collection

Record height
- Tallest in Vietnam since 2018^{[I]}
- Preceded by: Landmark 72

General information
- Status: Completed
- Type: Mixed-use
- Architectural style: Neo-futurism
- Location: Vinhomes Central Park (Saigon Newport), 720A Điện Biên Phủ Street, Thạnh Mỹ Tây, Ho Chi Minh City, Vietnam
- Groundbreaking: 13 December 2014
- Construction started: 2015
- Topped-out: 2018
- Completed: 2018
- Opened: 2018
- Inaugurated: 26 July 2018; 8 years ago
- Cost: US$123 million
- Owner: Vinhomes

Height
- Architectural: 461.3 metres (1,513 ft)
- Antenna spire: 65 metres (213 ft)
- Roof: 395.2 metres (1,297 ft)
- Observatory: 382.7 metres (1,256 ft)

Technical details
- Floor count: 81
- Floor area: 241,000 m^{2} (2,590,000 sq ft)
- Lifts/elevators: 29

Design and construction
- Architecture firm: Atkins
- Developer: Vinhomes
- Structural engineer: Arup
- Services engineer: Aurecon, Mace, CotecCons
- Main contractor: Coteccons
- Known for: Tallest building in Vietnam, second tallest building in Southeast Asia

Other information
- Number of rooms: 223 hotel rooms
- Public transit: L1 L5 Tan Cang station

Website
- www.marriott.com/sgnak

Landmark 81 is a supertall skyscraper in Ho Chi Minh City, Vietnam. It is primarily invested in and developed by Vinhomes, the largest Vietnamese real-estate developer. Landmark 81 holds the position of the tallest building in Vietnam, the second-tallest building in Southeast Asia, as well as the seventeenth-tallest building in the world overall.

The 461.2-metre-tall (1,513 ft), 81-story building is located where the Newport logistics base was on the western banks of the Saigon River in Thạnh Mỹ Tây ward, located in the northeast side of Ho Chi Minh City's historic center and to the immediate southern side of Saigon Bridge. The tower is built at the heart of Vinhomes Central Park, a $1.5 billion high-end mixed-use urban development. The development comprises an Autograph Collection hotel (developed by Vinpearl and originally known as Vinpearl Landmark 81 Hotel) with conference facilities, luxury apartments, the Vincom Center Landmark 81 Mall (the second high-end retail spaces of Vingroup in Ho Chi Minh City after the Vincom Center Đồng Khởi), officetel, restaurants, bars, and a multi-story observation deck.

== History ==
Landmark 81 under construction in 2017

The ground-breaking opening ceremony for the tower was held on 13 December 2014. In October 2017, construction reached floor 69, and with a height of 270 metres (890 ft), it already surpassed the Bitexco Financial Tower to become the tallest building in Ho Chi Minh City. By January 2018, all floor construction was completed, with only the spire and crown remaining unfinished. On 10 April 2018, the last segment of the crown spire was added, completing Landmark 81. The building's base, which takes up 6 floors with a total space of 50,000 m^{2} (540,000 sq ft), was opened on 26 July 2018 to mark the 25th anniversary of its owner's parent company, Vingroup.

The observation deck, named SkyView, opened on 28 April 2019. The deck, spanning from floor 79 at 369.65 m (1,212.8 ft) to floor 81 at 382.65 m (1,255.4 ft), is currently Vietnam's highest observation deck. Tickets range from 403,000 Vietnamese dong (US$$17.40) for children to 810,000 dong (US$34.80) for adults.

On 21 September 2022, an Autograph Collection hotel opened in Landmark 81. The hotel commences from the 47th floor to 71st floor of the skyscraper, housing 223 rooms.

The building's shape is partially inspired by the appearance of a bundle of bamboo sticks, which in Vietnamese culture is a metaphor for strength.

== Floor plan ==
The following is a breakdown of floors.

Floor	Use	Featuring
81	SkyView Observatory	SkyTouch Glass Bridge
80	SkyView Observatory	Miwaku Premium - Japanese Fusion Cuisine
79	SkyView Observatory	Miwaku Coffee Lounge
78	Mechanical floor	
72–77	Restaurants, club, cafe & bars	
71–68	Vinpearl Landmark 81, Autograph Collection Hotel	
67	Vinpearl Landmark 81, Autograph Collection Hotel	Tenku – Japanese Modern Kaiseki
66	Vinpearl Landmark 81, Autograph Collection Hotel	Oriental Pearl Restaurant
49–65	Vinpearl Landmark 81, Autograph Collection Hotel	
48	Vinpearl Landmark 81, Autograph Collection Hotel	The Cloud
47	Vinpearl Landmark 81, Autograph Collection Hotel	Pool Bar
46H	Mechanical floor	
42–46	The Landmark 81 – Vinhomes Central Park, SkyVilla, Officetel	
22–41	The Landmark 81 – Vinhomes Central Park	
21	Mechanical floor	
6–20	The Landmark 81 – Vinhomes Central Park	
5	Residential Clubhouse, Restaurant	
4	Residential Lounge, Restaurant	
3	Vincom Center Landmark 81, VinFast showroom (L1–B1), ice rink	California Centuryon Landmark 81 Fitness & Yoga
2	Vincom Center Landmark 81, VinFast showroom (L1–B1), ice rink	
1	Vincom Center Landmark 81, VinFast showroom (L1–B1), ice rink	
B1	Vincom Center Landmark 81, VinFast showroom (L1–B1), ice rink	CGV Cinema
B2	Autograph Collection's Event & Meeting Venues	
B2–B3	Parking	
Notes: The restaurants in Floor 4 and 5 are also part of the Vincom Center Landmark 81

== Vincom Center Landmark 81 ==
Vincom Center Landmark 81 is a shopping mall of Vincom Retail in the bottom floors and basement of Landmark 81 with an area of 59,000 m^{2} (640,000 sq ft), website at Vincom Center Landmark 81, it is the second high-end shopping mall of Vincom to be opened in Ho Chi Minh City after the Vincom Center Đồng Khởi (would be third if included the former Vincom Center A, now is Union Square Saigon). The mall spans over the tower first five-storey and first basement, featuring:

Level	Categories	Tenants
5	Restaurants	Bornga Korean BBQ
4	Restaurants	Yu Pin Xuan - Chinese Restaurant (closed recently), California Fitness & Yoga Center
3	Luggage, F&B, wellness and other services	California Fitness & Yoga Center, Face Wash Fox, Moodit Light Self-photo Studio, Samsonite
2	Fashion, shoes, accessories, F&B and other services	Adidas, Anta, Fila, Levi's, Nike, Salomon, Coco Ichibanya, Garmin, Owndays, Phú Nhuận Jewelry, Thế Giới Kim Cương, Dì Mai, RuNam Bistro Landmark 81
1	Fashion, cosmetics, accessories, F&B and other services	AAPE, Armani Exchange, Banana Republic, Bath & Body Works, Birkenstock, Calvin Klein, Cashion, Cole Hann, Dior, Dreame, Dyson, ECCO, Escentric Signature, EveryHuman, FCUK, Hazzys, Lacoste, Cao Fine Jewelry, LukFook Jewelry, Pandora, Polo Ralph Lauren, Tommy Hilfiger, The Body Shop, Thế Giới Nước Hoa, Sulwhasoo, Swarovski, Uniqlo, Wilson, Katinat Coffee & Tea, Phê La, Starbucks
B1	Entertainment, family & kids, F&B services, supermarket, electronics	CGV Cinema, Funny Kids, Mykingdom, Peektoy, Vincom Ice Rink, VinFast showroom, WinMart, Annam Gourmet, Akemi Uchi, Amara Home & Living, Casio, Micro Scooters, Minigood, Olivia Burton London, Philips, Sony, Tefal, Bing Xue, Capricciosa Italian Restaurant, Chili Thai, Cocoha, Cửu Vân Long Buffet Seafood, Haidilao, Hokkaido Sachi, Highlands Coffee, Hulu, Long Wang, Machida Shoten, New Zealand Natural, Royce', Siam Sugar, Som Tum Thai, Sushi Kei, Texas Chicken,

=== Notes: ===
- The CGV Vincom Center Landmark 81 Cinema featuring IMAX, ScreenX and Gold Class formats
- The Yu Pin Xuan - Chinese Restaurant was closed from July 2026 and still not recognized new tenant
- RuNam Bistro Landmark 81 re-loacated from outdoor space at Level 1 to Level 2 in 2026 after 8 years

== Gallery ==
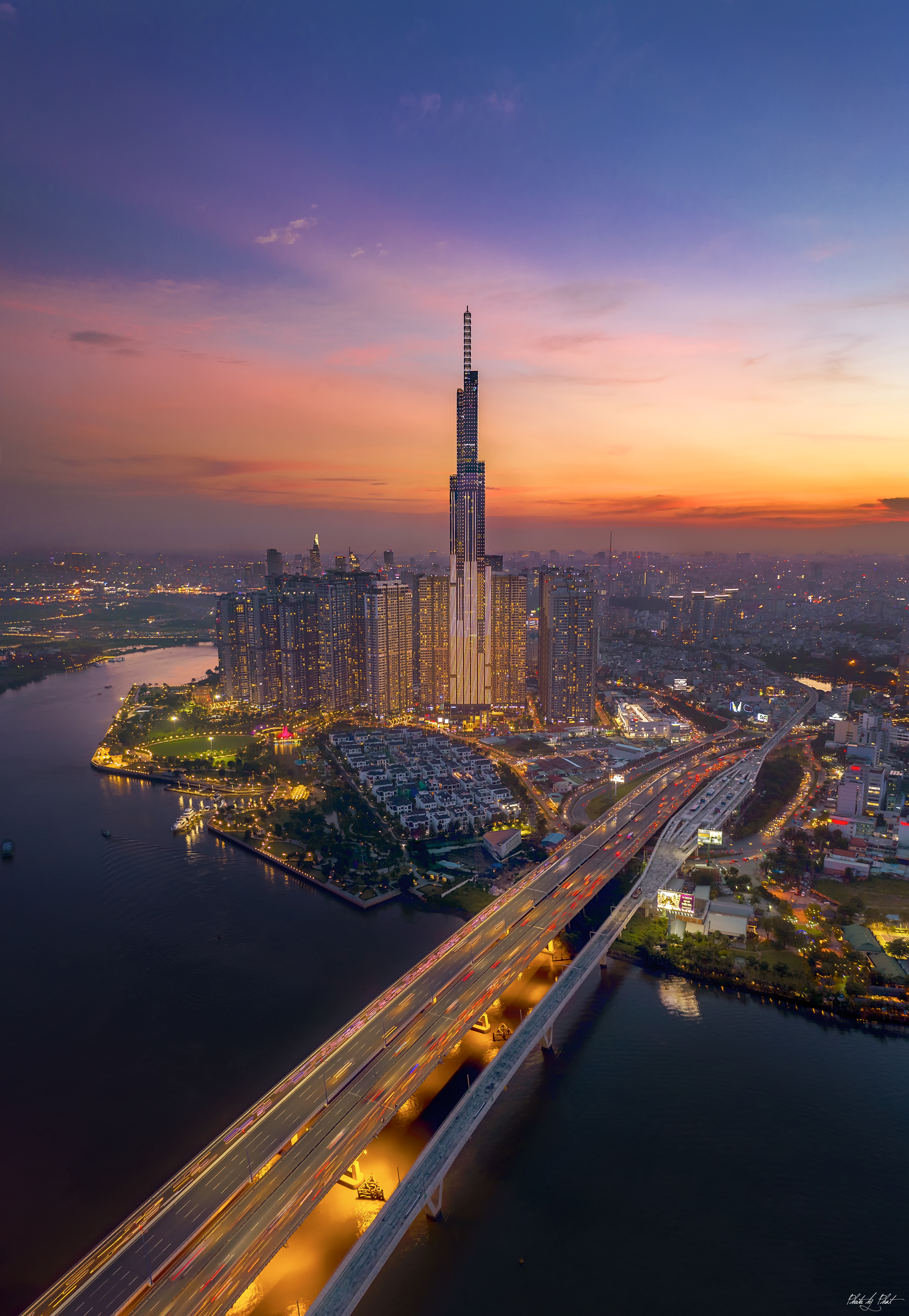
Landmark 81 at dusk with Saigon Bridge in Binh Thanh District

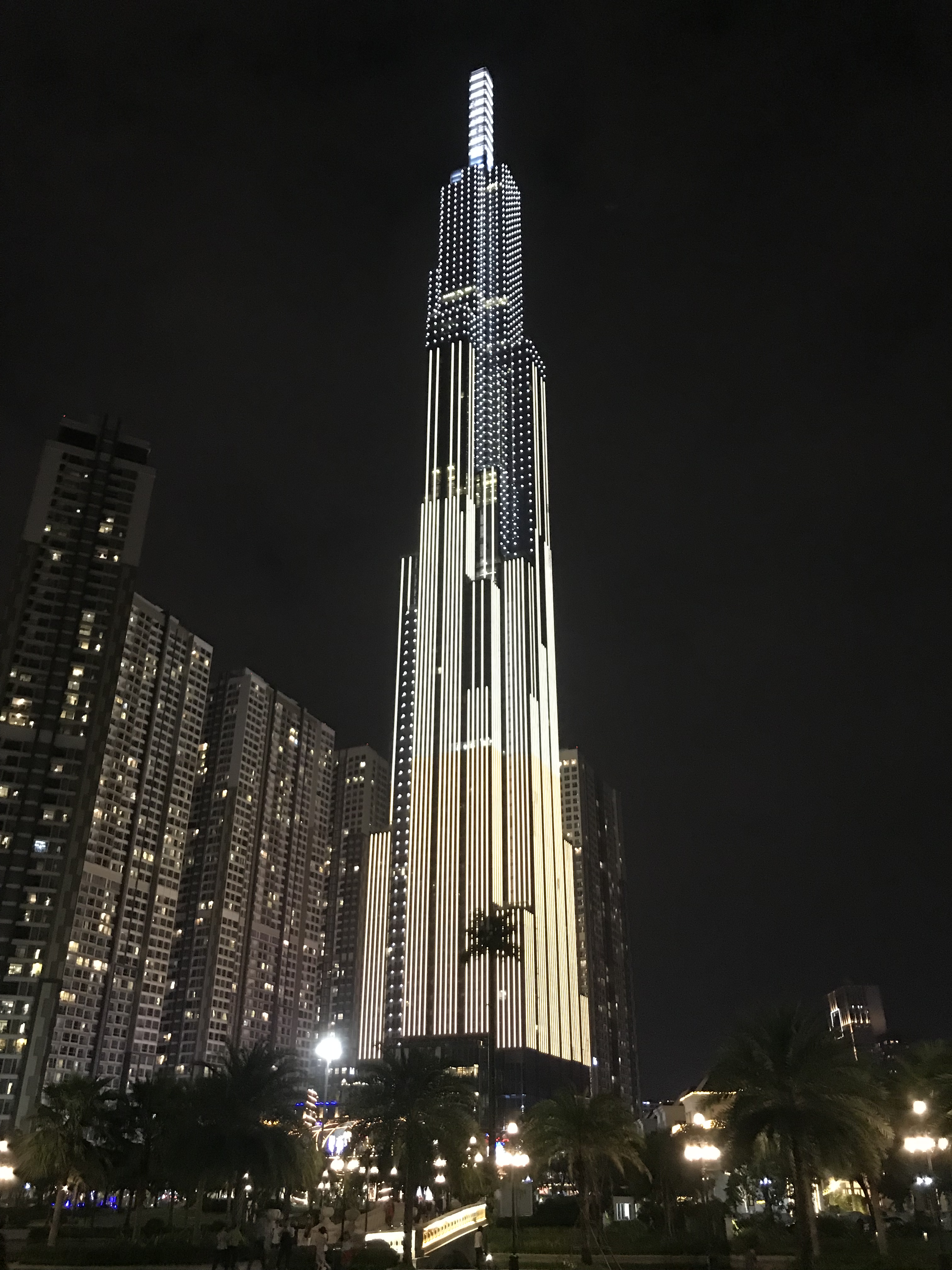
Landmark 81 at night

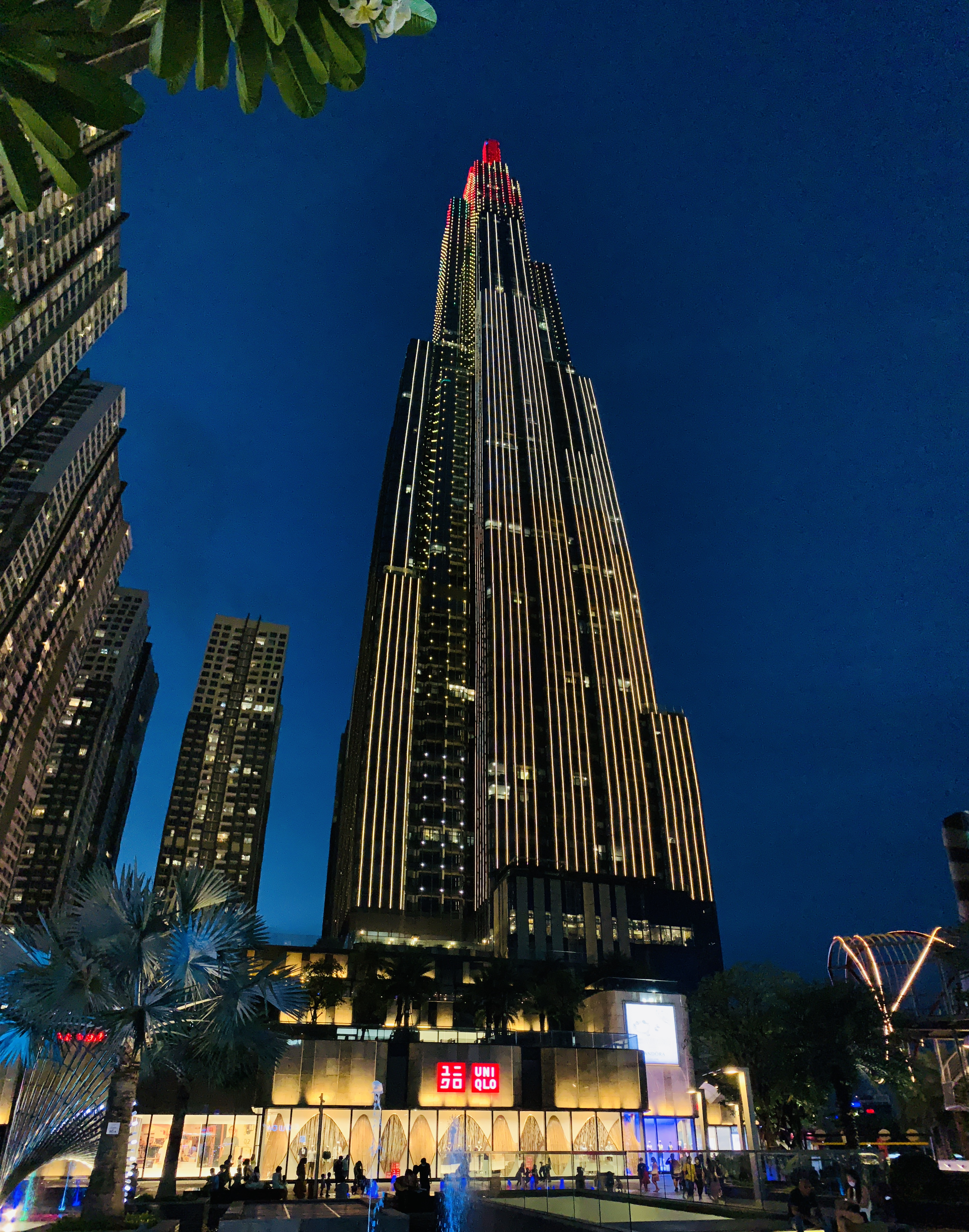
View of the building from street level with Vincom Center Landmark 81

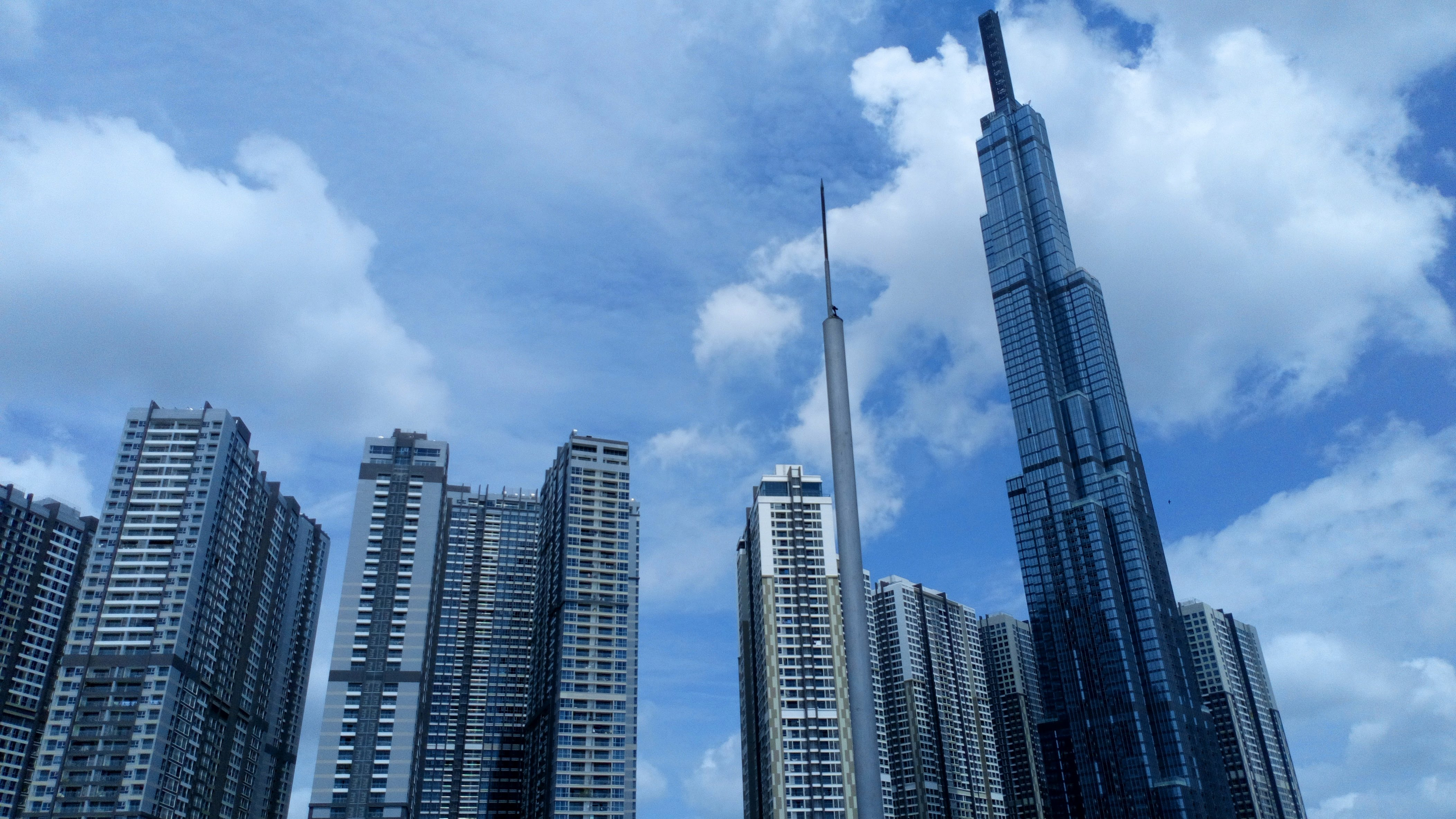
Landmark 81 surrounded by other residential buildings in Vinhomes Central Park

Landmark 81 seen from Nguyễn Hữu Cảnh Tunnel roof

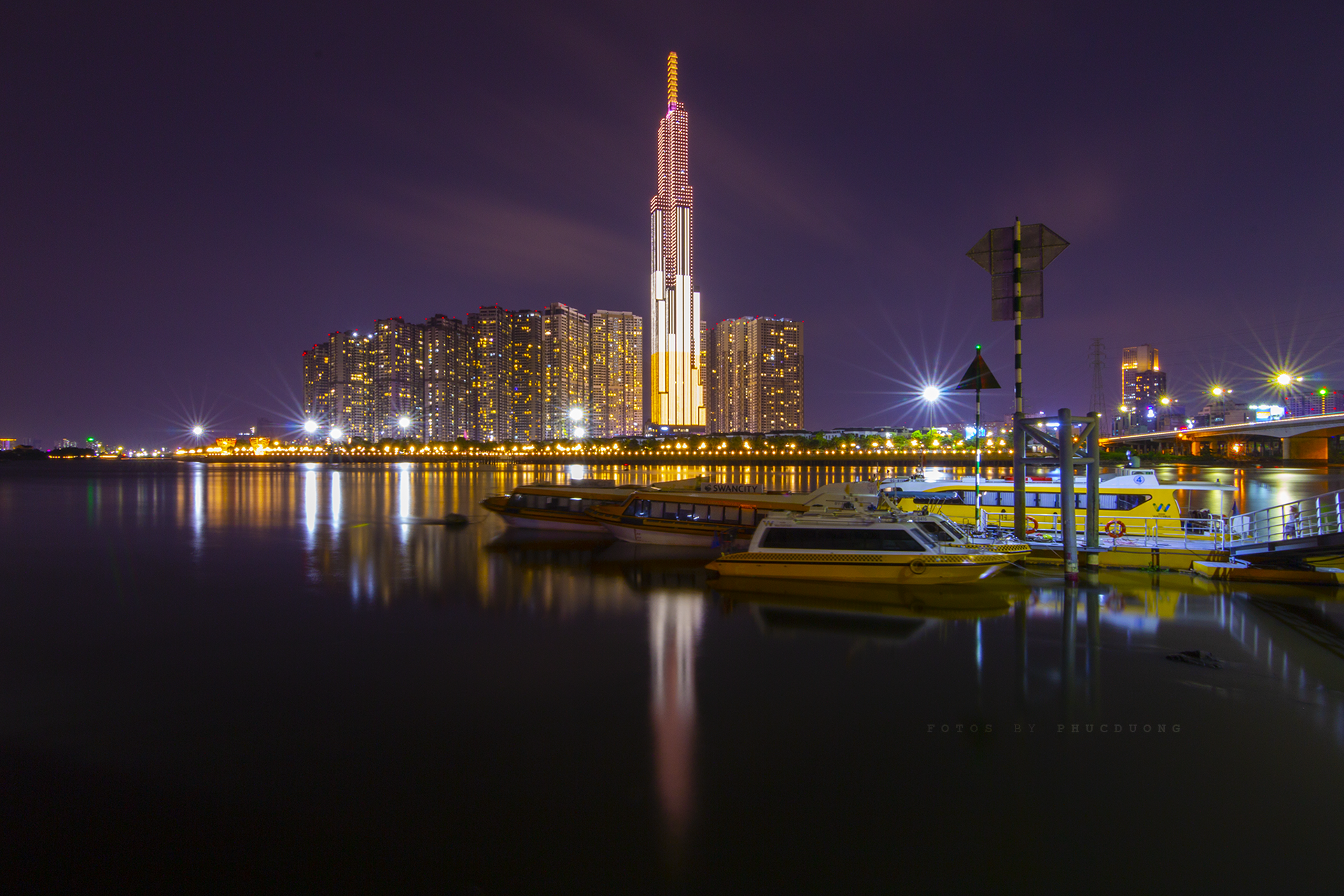
Vinhomes Central Park in the night from Bình An Quay of Saigon Waterbus, An Khánh

== See also ==
- Bitexco Financial Tower
- Saigon Centre
- Vincom Center Đồng Khởi
- List of tallest buildings in Vietnam
- List of tallest buildings
- List of tallest buildings in Southeast Asia

Records
Preceded by Keangnam Landmark 72	Tallest Building in Vietnam; 2018–present 461.2 m	Succeeded by None
Preceded by Bitexco Financial Tower	Tallest Building in Ho Chi Minh City; 2018–present 461.2 m	Succeeded by None
Preceded by Petronas Towers	Tallest Building in Southeast Asia; 2018–2021; 461.2 m	Succeeded by Merdeka 118
