= Vingroup =

Vietnamese conglomerate founded in 1993

Vingroup Joint Stock Company
- Trade name: Vingroup Company
- Native name: Tập đoàn Vingroup – Công ty CP
- Type: Private
- Traded as: HOSE: VIC
- Industry: Conglomerate
- Predecessor: Technocom Corporation
- Founded: August 8, 1993; 33 years ago in Ukraine as Technocom
- Founder: Phạm Nhật Vượng
- Headquarters: Vinhomes Riverside, Long Bien District, Hanoi, Vietnam
- Area served: Worldwide, primarily in Vietnam
- Key people: Phạm Nhật Vượng (Chairman); Nguyễn Việt Quang (CEO)
- Revenue: ▼VND101.8 trillion (2022)
- Net income: ▲VND2.08 trillion (2022)
- Number of employees: 51,400 (2022)
- Subsidiaries: See § Subsidiaries
- Website: vingroup.net

Vingroup JSC (Vietnamese: Tập đoàn Vingroup – Công ty CP, lit. 'Vingroup Group – JSC') is a private Vietnamese conglomerate owned by entrepreneur Phạm Nhật Vượng as the largest shareholder, and headquartered in Long Bien district, Hanoi. Vingroup is one of the largest conglomerates of Vietnam, focusing on technology, industry, real estate development, retail, and services from healthcare to hospitality. As of 2022, Vingroup's revenue and that of its subsidiaries accounted for nearly 1.1% of Vietnam's GDP⠀⠀

The company was founded in Ukraine in 1993 by property developer and entrepreneur Phạm Nhật Vượng as Technocom and originally produced food products.

== History ==
Vingroup was founded in Ukraine on August 8, 1993 as Technocom. It started as a food company, initially producing dried food products, notably instant noodles under the Mivina brand by Phạm Nhật Vượng. By 2000, the company began operations in Vietnam.

In 2006, Vinpearl Land, the conglomerate's first amusement park, was opened in Nha Trang.

In 2007, Vingroup was listed on the Ho Chi Minh City Stock Exchange.

In February 2010, Vingroup sold its Technocom facility in Ukraine and the Mivina brand to Nestlé for a deal worth approximately US$150 million.

In October 2014, Vingroup bought the supermarket chain OceanMart from Ocean Group and was rebranded as VinMart in a move to gain market share in the retail industry. Vingroup also launched an animal conservation program on Phú Quốc, Vietnam's largest island, in September 2015. It had started with research and conservation of some rare animal species and their natural habitats by Vinpearl Safari.

In October 2015, Vingroup bought the Vietnamese supermarket chain Maximark.

In 2016, Vingroup began operating its Vinmec healthcare and Vinschool education subsidiaries as non-profits.

In September 2017, Vingroup started construction of a car factory for the VinFast subsidiary.

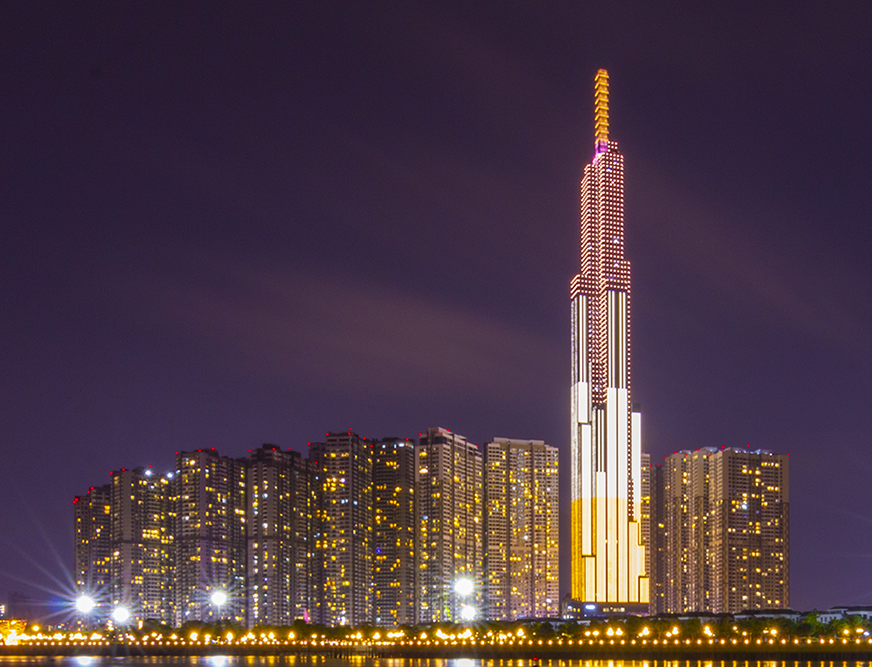
Landmark 81 tower

In May 2018, 10% of Vinhomes was made public on the Ho Chi Minh City Stock Exchange. The 25th anniversary of Vingroup was celebrated by the opening of its Landmark 81 tower in Ho Chi Minh City, the tallest completed building in Southeast Asia at the time.

In October 2018, Vingroup announced that VinFast, its car division, would become the first domestic car manufacturer, with an annual production capacity of 250,000 cars. $3.5 billion was invested in the development of this project.

In November 2018, the city of Hanoi announced that the city would be hosting a Formula 1 Grand Prix starting in April 2020, with Vingroup as the promoter of the project. The race was later cancelled due to the COVID-19 pandemic.

In December 2018, Vingroup entered the smartphone market with the launch of VinSmart phones, running on Android operating system. The smartphones are produced by the VinSmart unit.

In 2019, Vingroup's automobile subsidiary VinFast introduced three new combustion vehicles.

In March 2019, Vingroup acquired the e-wallet platform MonPay.

In May 2019, South Korean conglomerate SK Group bought a 6.1% stake in Vingroup for $1 billion.

In February 2020, Vinpearl Land rebranded as VinWonders.

In May 2021, Vingroup announced that it would cease the production of smartphones and televisions. Vingroup's manufacturing division lost approximately $1.05 billion "due to sluggish sales of gasoline-powered cars at home and growing investments in the emerging electric vehicle business."

In January 2025, Vingroup's market capitalization had declined by nearly half to approximately $6 billion since VinFast's listing in August 2023. Over the past year, its shares have fallen 6.6%, the largest drop among Vietnam's ten largest listed companies, underperforming the Vietnam market's 7.5% gain.

== Subsidiaries ==
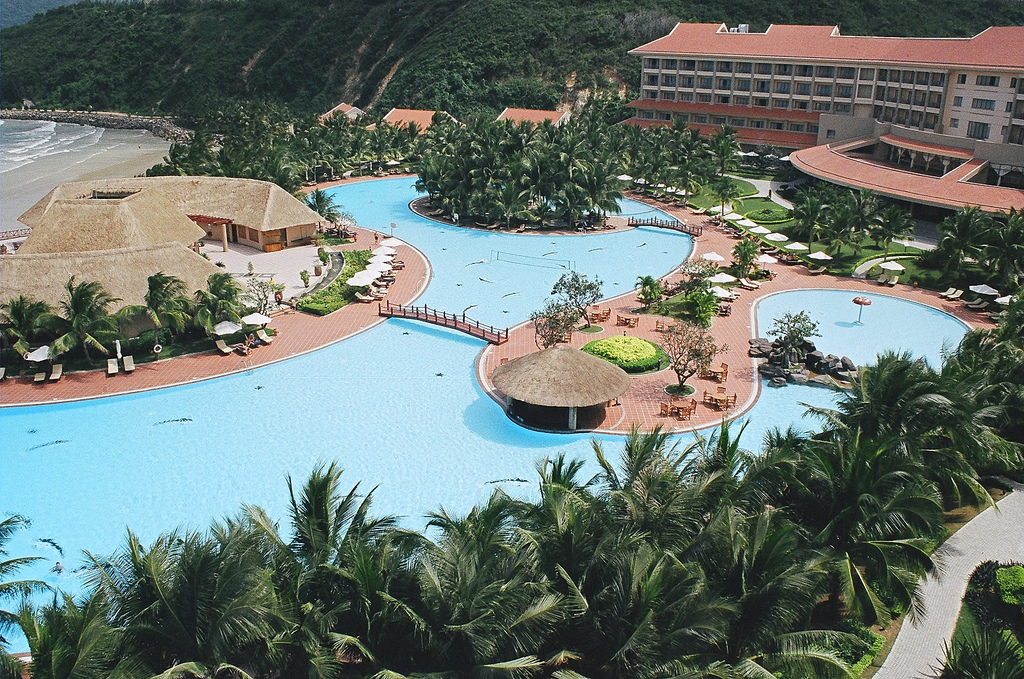
VinPearl Hotel Nha Trang

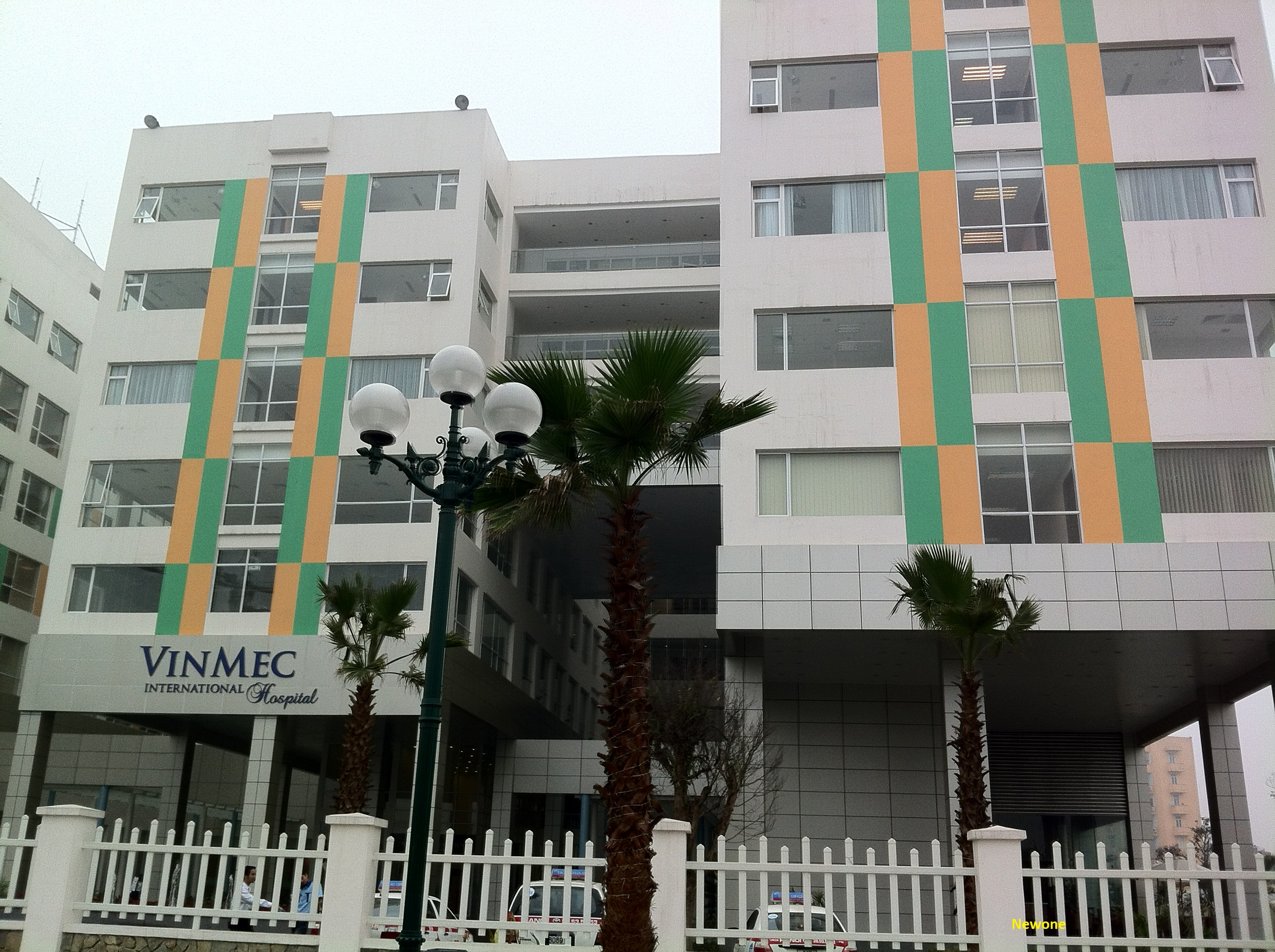
VinMec hospital

Vingroup was originally established as a merger of Vincom and VinPearl – the two businesses under Phạm Nhật Vượng ownership. Both of them still exist as significant subsidiaries under Vingroup.

=== Hospitality, real estate, healthcare, and services ===
==== Vinhomes ====
Vinhomes is a subsidiary of residential real estate, villas, and other services. Vingroup develops real estate across three main segments: high-end residential projects under the Vinhomes brand, mid-range housing originally branded VinCity (later renamed Vinhomes Sapphire, Vinhomes Ruby, and Vinhomes Diamond), affordable housing projects under Happy Town, and premium office leasing system (Vin Office). Notable developments include Vinhomes Royal City and Vincom Mega Mall, Vinhomes Times City & Park Hill, Vinhomes Nguyễn Chí Thanh, Vinhomes Riverside & Harmony Long Biên, Vinhomes Central Park and The Landmark 81 (Vinhomes Tân Cảng), Vinhomes Dragon Bay Quảng Ninh, Vinhomes Imperia Hải Phòng, Vinhomes Skylake Phạm Hùng, Vinhomes Ocean Park Gia Lâm, Vinhomes Grand Park Phước Thiện, Vinhomes Smart City Tây Mỗ - Đại Mỗ, Vinhomes New Center Hà Tĩnh, Vinhomes Star City Thanh Hoá, Vinhomes Golden River Ba Son, Vinhomes West Point Nam Từ Liêm, and Vinhomes Green Bay Mễ Trì.

==== Vincom Retail ====
Vincom Retail is a commercial real estate and office subsidiary, with 3 different models for each segment:

- Vincom Center: This model of shopping mall which are located in prime locations, right in the heart of major cities such as Hanoi and Ho Chi Minh City (e.g., Vincom Center Đồng Khởi in Saigon, Ho Chi Minh City or Vincom Center Metropolis in Ngọc Hà, Hanoi) and are usually situated in the commercial podiums of high-rise office buildings or luxury apartments. The Vincom Center ones typically bring together high-end international fashion brands, luxury labels, and upscale restaurants, serving the middle and upper classes.
- Vincom Plaza: It is a model of medium-sized shopping mall, with a neat and welcoming design, it is commonly found in newly developed cities or moderately to averagely developed cities (often former provincial cities) or newly developed suburban areas of large cities such as in Hanoi or Ho Chi Minh City.
- Vincom Mega Mall: A massive shopping centers model, integrating a "one-stop destination" model combining shopping and large-scale entertainment (such as ice skating rinks and technology-based entertainment areas). They are typically located within new mixed-use urban complexes or very large residential areas that can be close or far to the city center and developed by Vinhomes (such as Vincom Mega Mall Grand Park within Vinhomes Grand Park) or other developers (such as Vincom Mega Mall Thảo Điền located within the Masteri Thảo Điền apartment complex).

Key commercial complexes and projects include: Vincom Mega Mall Royal City and Vincom Mega Mall Times City, Vincom Mega Mall Royal Island, Vincom Mega Mall Grand Park, Vincom Center Bà Triệu, Vincom Center Đồng Khởi, Vincom Center Landmark 81, Vincom Plaza Long Biên, Vincom Plaza Imperia Hải Phòng, Vincom Plaza Đà Nẵng, Vincom Plaza Cần Thơ, Vincom Plaza Hạ Long, Vincom Plaza Thủ Đức, etc, as well as the Vincom+ and Vincom Shophouse systems.

==== Vinpearl ====
Vinpearl Resorts is a resort and hotel chain of Vingroup, providing hospitality, culture, and cuisine to customers.Vinpearl operates luxury resorts and tourism complexes across Vietnam, including Vinpearl Nha Trang, Vinpearl Đà Nẵng, Vinpearl Làng Vân, and Vinpearl Hải Giang. Its high-end golf system operates under Vinpearl Golf. The Vinpearl Hotel and Resort network includes four main brands: Vinpearl Luxury, Vinpearl Hotels & Resorts, Vinpearl Discovery, and VinOasis. Prominent properties include Vinpearl Luxury Đà Nẵng, Vinpearl Luxury Nha Trang, and Vinpearl Resort & Golf Phú Quốc.

==== VinWonders ====
Vingroup operates amusement parks, ice rinks, and water parks under the VinWonders brand. The group also manages the Vinpearl Safari wildfire care and conservation park in Phú Quốc, as well as VinWonders Nha Trang, VinWonders Phú Quốc, VinWonders Nam Hội An, and the Vinpearl Aquarium in Times City.

==== VinMec ====
VinMec is a healthcare service subsidiary. The VinMec system includes the VinMec International General Hospital at Times City, Hanoi, and the VinMec Royal City International Clinic.

=== VinFast ===
VinFast was launched in 2017 to manufacture cars and motorcycles powered by both internal combustion and electric engines. The company planned five vehicle types: a 5-seater sedan, SUV, a compact car, an electric car, and an electric bus—all set to debut in 2019. Two internal combustion models—a five-seat sedan and a seven-seat SUV—were successfully introduced to the public in October 2018 at the Paris Motor Show.

Since 2021, VinFast has established offices and operations in the United States, Canada, France, Germany, and the Netherlands. The company focuses on the development and export of electric vehicles. In 2024, Vinfast launched the VF6 electric SUV in Europe and expanded its retail network in North America.

=== Education ===
==== Vinschool ====
The Vinschool education system offers programs from kindergarten to high school. As of now, it operates 27 campuses in Hanoi and Ho Chi Minh, serving more than 23,000 students. Vinschool is also the largest Vietnamese private school system in Vietnam.

==== Vinuniversity ====
Vingroup established VinUniversity (VinUni) and VinMec University of Health Sciences. It has signed strategic cooperation agreements with two Ivy League institutions- Cornell University and the University of Pennsylvania (Penn). On November 11, 2019, VInUni announced its first admissions cycle (2020-2021) for three academic fields: Business Administration, Health Sciences, and Engineering & Computer Science. Admission includes two rounds: application evaluation and interview. Candidates are required to demonstrate proficiency or potential to study in English: artistic or athletic talent is considered an advantage.

=== Entertainment and culture ===
Since 2023, Vingroup has hosted annual 8Wonder music festivals, featuring Vietnamese and international artists, and other cultural and entertainment activities for audiences.

In November 2025, Vingroup announced that they have invested in establishing three additional subsidiaries to preserve and promote Vietnamese traditional identity and culture.

- V-Culture Talents: This subsidiary focuses on selecting, training, and developing young talents in music, performing arts and traditional cultural forms.
- V-Film Cinema: This subsidiary operates in film production and distribution, television programming, photography, audio recording and music publishing. It also trains professionals across the film industry, from directors and screenwriters to actors.
- V-Spirit: This subsidiary organises, promotes and manages cultural and artistic events, exhibitions, conferences and seminars.

=== Other subsidiaries ===
- VinFuture Prize: Annual international award, honoring health, technology, science, and sustainability achievements.
- VinID: Providing Fintech, Loyalty and Digital Marketing services with roughly 7 million users in 2019.
- VinAI: Artificial intelligence research.
- VinBrain: Healthcare technology using AI and machine learning.
- VinBigData: AI and data science applications for business.
- VinCSS: Cyber security services.
- VinHMS: Hotel management software.
- Thien Tam Fund: Philanthropic organization on behalf of Vingroup.
- Green SM: Ridesharing company

=== Sold or dissolved subsidiaries ===
- VinSmart: Smartphones and televisions.
- VinCommerce: Convenience stores (VinMart+) and supermarkets (VinMart). The controlling stake was sold to Masan Group in 2019, but VinGroup retains a large stake. South Korean conglomerate SK Group has agreed to acquire a 16.3% stake.
- Vincom (Retail): Shopping malls and retail (Vincom Centre, Vincom Plaza, Vincom Mega Mall, Vincom+) One of the founding arms of Vingroup besides VinPearl.
- Vincom (Office): Office real estate.
