= Akemi (company) =

AKEMI
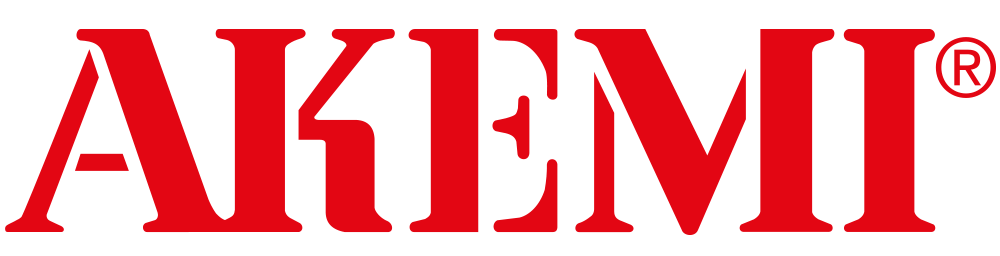
- Company type: GmbH
- Industry: Chemical-technical specialist factory
- Founded: 1933
- Founder: Erich Höntsch
- Headquarters: Nuremberg, Germany
- Area served: Worldwide
- Key people: Dirk C. Hamann; Torsten Hamann
- Products: Two-component adhesives, fillers, cleaning and care products for natural stone. fillers and repair materials, sealants, protective coatings, varnishes as well as cleaning and care products for cars.
- Number of employees: approx. 250 (2019)
- Website: akemi.com

Akemi GmbH (stylized as AKEMI) is a company in the chemical industry which is active worldwide. Its headquarters are in Nuremberg in Germany and its core competence is the manufacturing of two-component adhesive systems. The chemical-technical specialist factory manufactures adhesives, fillers as well as cleaning and care products for the natural stone sector. In addition, it produces fillers and repair materials, sealants, protective coatings, varnishes as well as cleaning and car care products for the automotive branch.

Akemi's products are manufactured at two locations within Germany, Nuremberg and Wiehl, as well as at five other sites abroad. These are located in Atlanta in the US, São Paulo in Brazil, Tuzla in the suburbs of Istanbul in Turkey, Bangalore and Delhi in India and Beijing in China. According to the company (2019), Akemi's products are sold in more than 100 countries.

== Company name ==
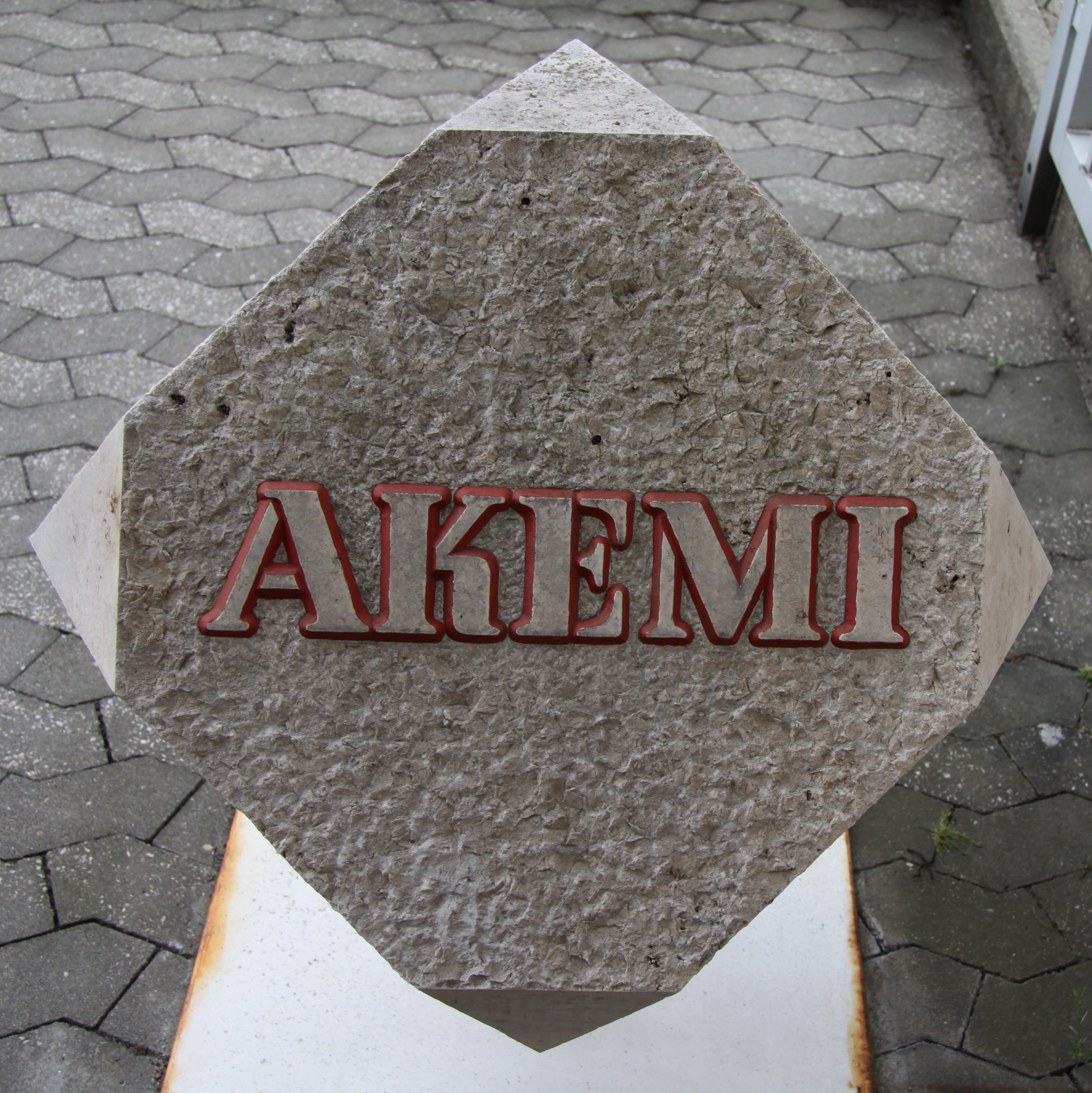
Logo of Akemi on shell-bearing limestone

The company was founded in 1933 and was originally called "Akema", supposedly after the daughter of the Japanese consul in Berlin at that time. To avoid any confusion with the Achema, the Trade Fair for Chemical Technology, Environmental Protection and Biotechnology, the founder, Erich Höntsch, renamed the company Akemi in 1952. The name Akemi is protected under Trademark law and is highly recognised worldwide in the natural stone sector on account of its quality and specialised assortment: "On account of their excellent quality and highly specialised assortment, the trade name AKEMI has become synonymous for stone adhesive."

== Company history ==
Erich Höntsch founded "Akema" in 1933. He was a businessman from Dresden who occupied himself with chemistry in his spare time and had a laboratory in his parents' summer house. There he developed a putty in powder form which, when added to water, could be used to glue animal hairs into shaving brushes. In this way he made a name for himself and built up a firm in Dresden which also supplied the shoe and electrical industry with adhesive products. After the end of the Second World War in 1945, Höntsch first sought refuge in Hannover and then moved to Nuremberg where he started producing adhesives again in 1948. In 1949, the company moved into a former carpenter’s workshop.

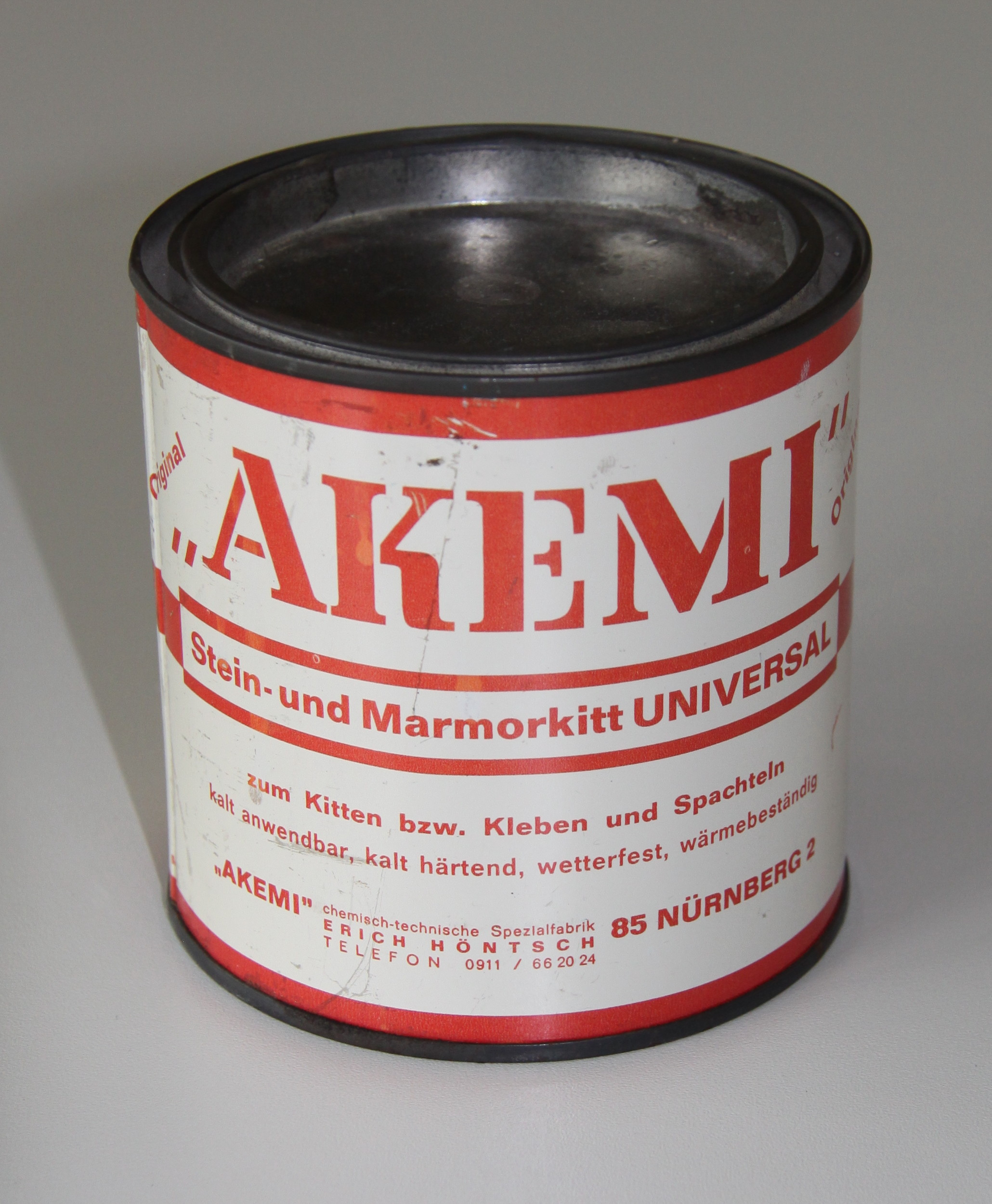
First label of the polyester adhesive in 1953

In 1952, he put the first adhesive based on polyester on the natural stone market and called it "Stein- und Marmorkitt Universal" unsaturated polyester (Universal Stone and Marble Filler). To satisfy the steadily growing demand for the products on the domestic market and abroad, he built up a distribution network and expanded his range of filler and adhesive systems. He brought out a new bonding system based on epoxy resin which was used at first for natural stone and later for cars too.

After the death of Erich Höntsch in 1970, his widow, Angelika Höntsch, took over the business and in 1972, the company moved into new buildings. The management of the enterprise remained in the hands of Angelika Höntsch until 1996, and was later taken over by Torsten Hamann.

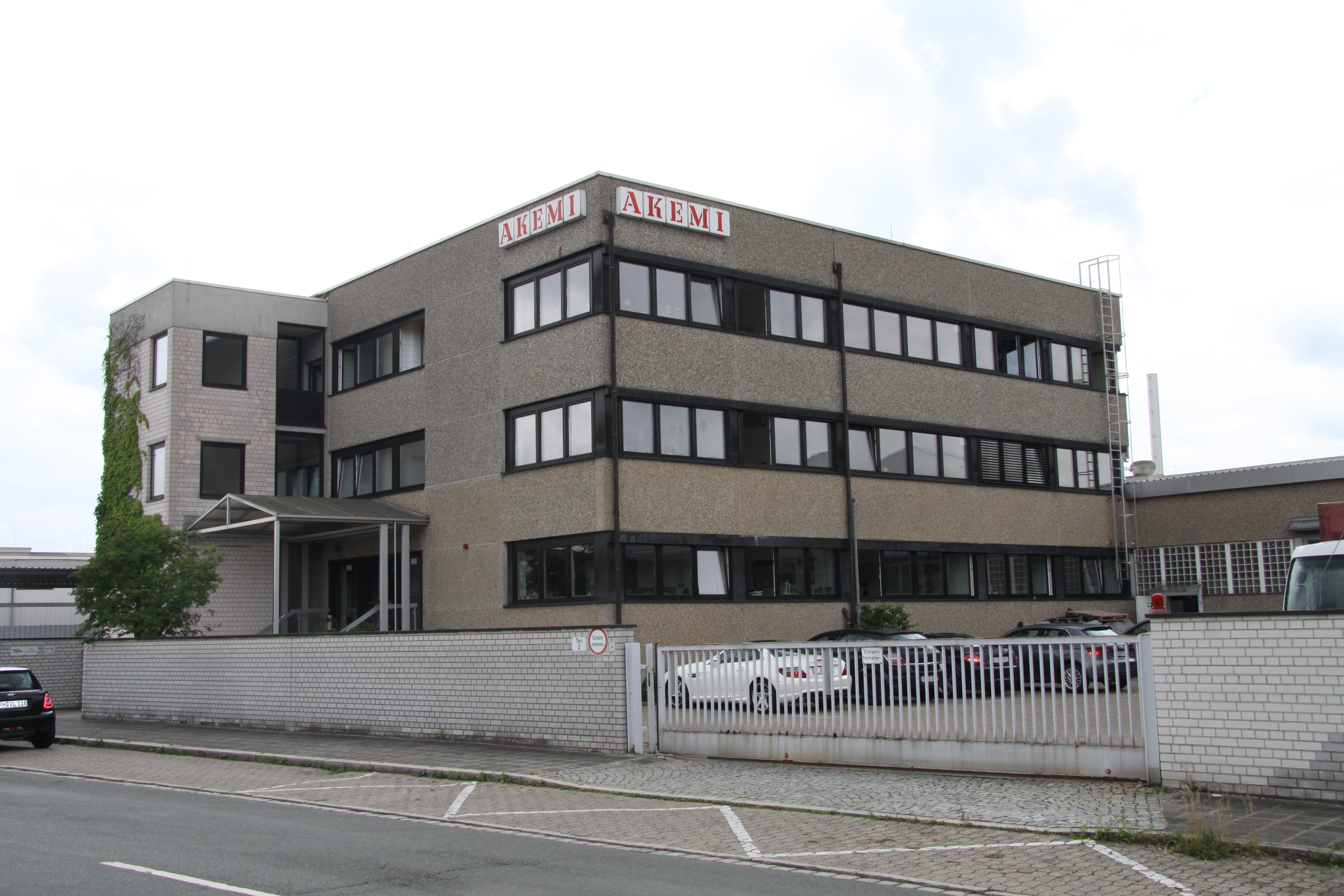
Akemi's company building in Nuremberg

Torsten Hamann expanded the company's premises to 12,000 m², extended the product range and reorganised production, dispatch and logistics. He stayed abreast of new developments at the beginning of globalisation and established production plants and distribution centres abroad.

In October 2001, his son, Dirk C. Hamann, doctor of law, joined the management of Akemi.

== Economic data ==
Approximately 60% of the company's turnover is generated in the natural stone sector and 40% in the automotive sector. Akemi employs approximately 250 employees worldwide, 100 of these at its head office. The company invests 10% of its turnover in research.

== Adhesive and filler systems ==
The names of the adhesives and stone fillers usually indicate their chemical components, for instance epoxy resin adhesive, and their field of application, for example marble filler. The adhesives can be used to attain load-carrying bonds between workpieces made of natural stone and engineered quartz composite as well as other materials. The fillers are used to fill pores or imperfections in natural stone products. In the natural stone sector the most frequently implemented adhesive systems are based on epoxy resins (EP resins) and unsaturated polyester resins (UP resins) as well as acrylic resins, methacrylate resins and polyurethane systems (PUR resins). However, there are also products which are a combination of two types of resin, e.g. epoxy acrylate. For the adhesives and fillers there are also the corresponding accessories such as a wide range of colorants, cartridge (applicator) gun, mixing nozzles etc. Above all, fillers based on polyurethane and epoxy resins are manufactured for the automotive sector.

=== Polyester adhesives and fillers ===
In 1952, Akemi brought out the first two-component stone adhesive and filler system on the basis of "UP resins and named it "Stein- und Marmorkitt Universal" (Universal Stone and Marble Filler). It was primarily used in the construction industry. This Akemi adhesive system was ideal for the user because it was unimportant whether it was used for repair work on a horizontal surface or for filling work on a vertical surface. In addition, the adhesive could be modified, when being mixed, to match the colour tone and the texture of the materials being treated. Furthermore, the adhesive hardened fast and could be polished. The adhesive strength was considerably higher than that of previously implemented systems. The obsolete bonding technology was thereafter totally replaced. The polyester stone adhesives and fillers react and harden when mixed with a hardener and can be applied within the temperature range + 5 °C to + 30 °C. The advantage of polyester bondings is the rapid hardening, the disadvantage is their sensitivity towards moisture.

Since 1983, there have also been one-component systems which harden within seconds in combination with ultraviolet lamps. These systems are implemented in the natural stone sector, mostly in stone polishing lines, and mainly for filling any imperfections.

Furthermore, the adhesives and fillers are also implemented in the automotive industry. Akemi put them on the market for the first time in 1954 as fillers and primers.

=== Epoxy resin adhesives and fillers ===
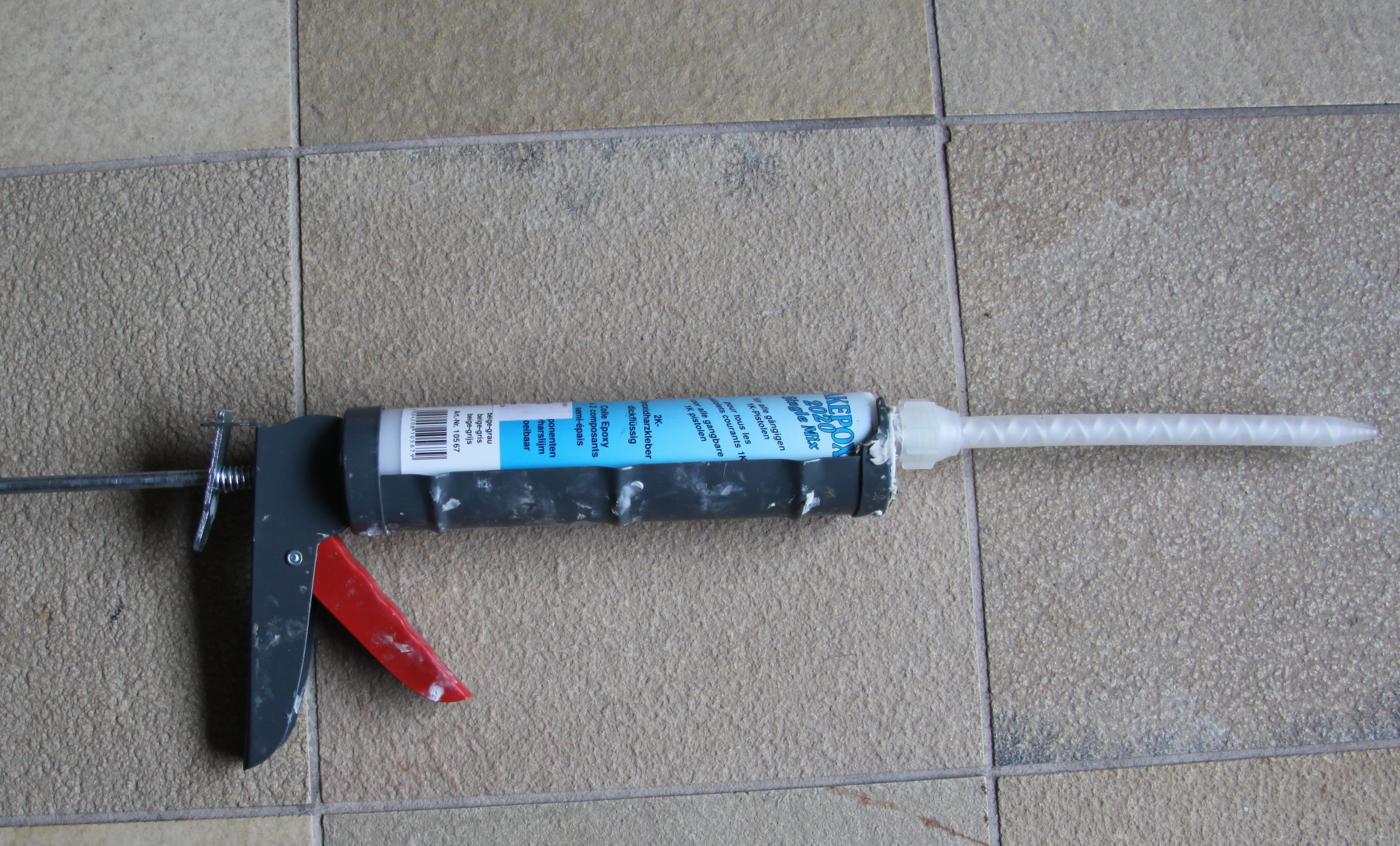
Akepox cartridge and mixing nozzle inserted into a so-called cartridge (applicator) gun.

The epoxy resin adhesive systems are used in the natural stone as well as the automotive sectors. In the natural stone branch, these products have replaced the polyester systems as these only had a low resistance to the influences of the weather. The epoxy adhesives, however, are capable of resisting many acids and lyes and therefore the Akemi product range Akepox came into existence. The adhesive bond of the stone glues based on epoxy resin which have been developed by Akemi is very strong and weather-resistant. On account of the reaction mechanism, these two-component adhesives have to be mixed in an exact ratio, dependent upon the application area. Their application therefore requires a certain degree of know-how with regard to the correct mixing ratios, temperatures and occupational safety. Epoxy resin adhesives have the highest bonding strength of all natural stone adhesives but they harden relatively slowly.

A further application area is the surface treatment of fissured and porous natural stone with highly fluid, transparent epoxy resin using the so-called "resinating process" (Latin: resina = resin). By means of the application of epoxy resin it was now also possible to strengthen and deep-fill fissured and porous stone which otherwise could not have been commercially utilised. This is of ecological importance, too. The industrial processes require that many factors are taken into consideration, for example, the temperature, viscosity, mixing ratios of the components as well as occupational safety measures etc.

Epoxy resin systems are also used for the restoration of stone. Quartz sand in various grain sizes is mixed with epoxy resin, dyed and modelled onto the damaged areas of historically important ornamentation and sculptures. In 2003, Akemi brought out an epoxy resin filler for anti-slip strips which can be used on stairs and floor surfacing which are made of natural or artificial stone.[14]

=== Epoxyacrylate adhesives ===
Adhesives based on epoxyacrylate are an alternative to the polyester adhesives and fillers because they harden very quickly, have minimal intrinsic colour and, after hardening, are suitable for use in areas where food is eaten or prepared. On account of these properties they are used indoors to bond natural and engineered stone as well as large ceramic surfaces, for instance kitchen countertops and in baths and toilets. With coloured or colour-matched products visible joints can be practically avoided. These adhesives have a high adhesive strength and the surfaces dry quickly thus allowing fast further processing.

=== Acrylic resin adhesives ===
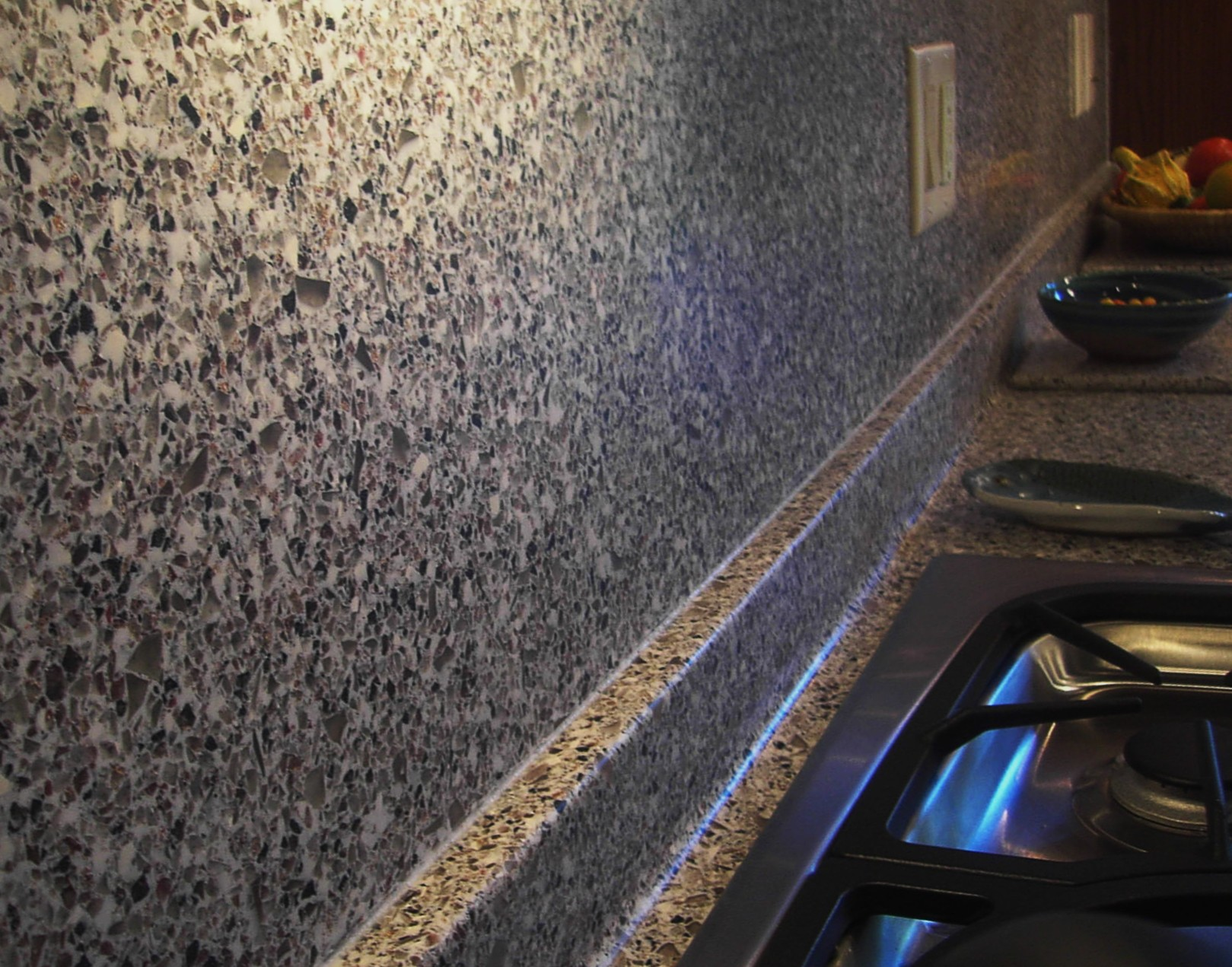
Solid surface material with clearly recognisable adhesive joints

The application areas of adhesives based on acrylic resins are similar to those for the adhesives and fillers on the basis of polyester resin and epoxyacrylate. They are particularly suited for the bonding of materials made of "solid surface": This is a material which has a grain structure similar to granite and which, on account of its light weight, is used, amongst others, in aircraft construction and for kitchen countertops. A disadvantage is the intensive odour when applying this adhesive.

=== Polyurethane resin adhesive ===
Special Polyurethane resin adhesives distinguish themselves from other reaction resin adhesives in that they have a low tendency to yellow. Akemi has developed adhesives of this kind and marketed them since 2014. They are used for the durable bonding of particularly light-coloured natural and engineered stone. They are also suitable for grouting stone surfaces. These adhesives can be used indoors as well as outdoors.

== Other products ==
=== Silicones ===
One-component silicones are mostly used as a binding agent for sealants and require atmospheric moisture to harden. During the hardening process either acetic acid or ethanol is set free. Akemi provides special, ready-made silicones for natural stone and guarantees that they do not discolour. These silicones are permanently elastic and as such are suitable for use in the construction industry.

=== Cleaning, protection and care ===
Since 1984, Akemi offers cleaning and care products for natural and engineered stone as well as for automobiles. The cleaners for natural stone are either acidic, neutral, alkaline or contain solvents. These protective products are mainly based on silicone compounds or modified polymers. These products do not produce surface layers but penetrate into the substance of the stone and not only have a high water-repellent effect but are also resistant to oil. The stone surfaces are thus provided with a shield against dirt and stains. This is of particular significance for kitchen countertops.

=== Automotive ===
From the technical as well the qualitative aspect, the entire range of Akemi car products is designed with the professional user in mind, e.g. auto body paintshops, car workshops, professional car cleaners, classic car restorers and coachbuilders (body-makers). The product range comprises products for repairs to cars, underbodies, exhaust systems and windscreens.

=== Two-component PUR primers for fillers and transparent varnishes ===
Since the beginning of 2000 Akemi has produced primers, fillers and transparent varnishes based on polyurethane which are used, above all, in professional auto body paintshops. They are also suitable for repairing small to medium-sized damage to the paintwork. This process, which is known as spot repair, is not suitable for colour varnish. However, the two-component substances are compatible with the commercially available colour varnishes of other manufacturers.

=== Products for industrial users ===
In one of the company's own laboratories, epoxy resin bondings for food areas can be developed and manufactured to meet the needs of key industrial customers in the automotive, rail, aviation and aircraft construction, container, furniture manufacturing, wood and designer furniture sectors. This also applies for the modification of orthopaedic products in the prosthesis construction sector.

=== Training and customer care ===
In 2003, Akemi recognised that the diverse product range and the high technical requirements involved in their implementation made training essential for the users. The company therefore built a training centre on their premises which today offers a wide range of seminars. On request, the company also provides training courses in the companies which implement their products, i.e. the processors, and carries out seminars abroad, notably in Egypt and India. The processors are provided with telephone assistance and are also supported in the development of concepts. Due to their worldwide presence, Akemi already provided technical information on their containers in 22 different languages as early as 2008. According to the information provided by the company, safety instruction sheets are written for each specific country and are currently (2019) available in 30 different languages. As a rule, technical specification sheets are available in German, English and French and sometimes in Spanish and Russian too.

== Buildings ==
Akemi's products have already been used in numerous modern and historical edifices.

A selection of buildings in which Akemi's products have been implemented

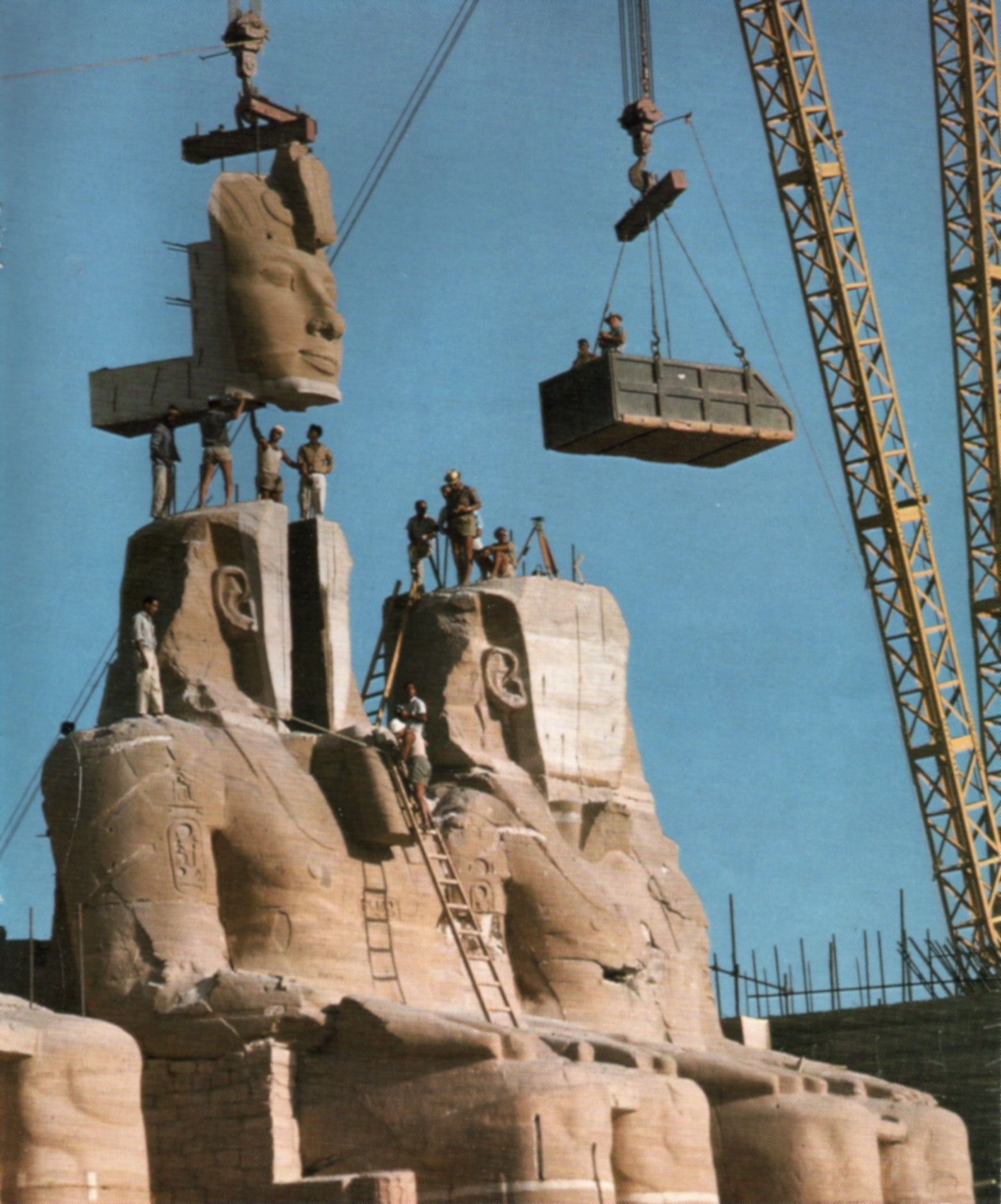
The temples of Abu Simbel in Egypt: The temples were dismantled and reconstructed with the aid of Akemi’s polyester adhesives and fillers.

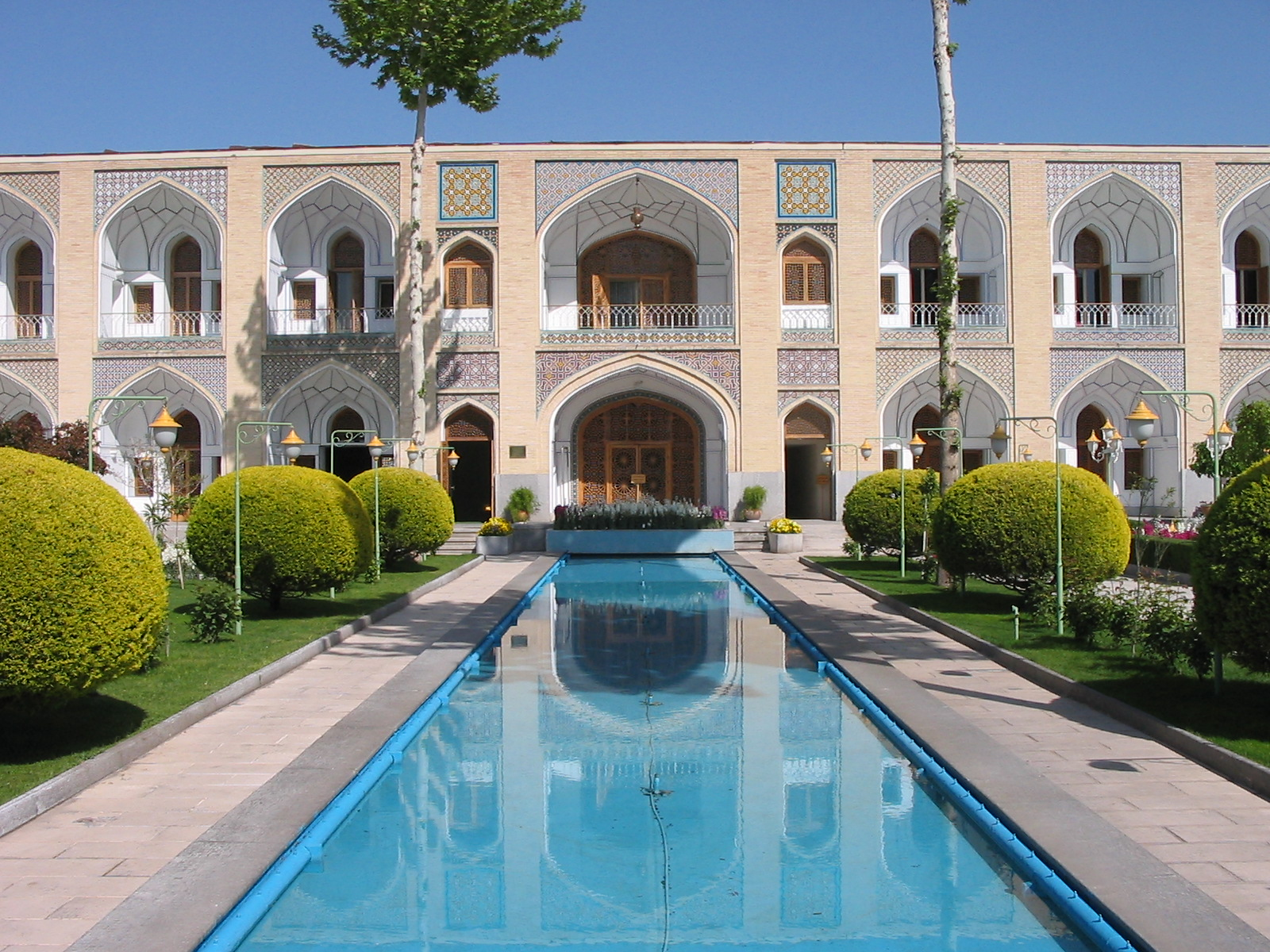
Abbasi Hotel in Iran: The floors, stairs and façades were treated by Akemi.

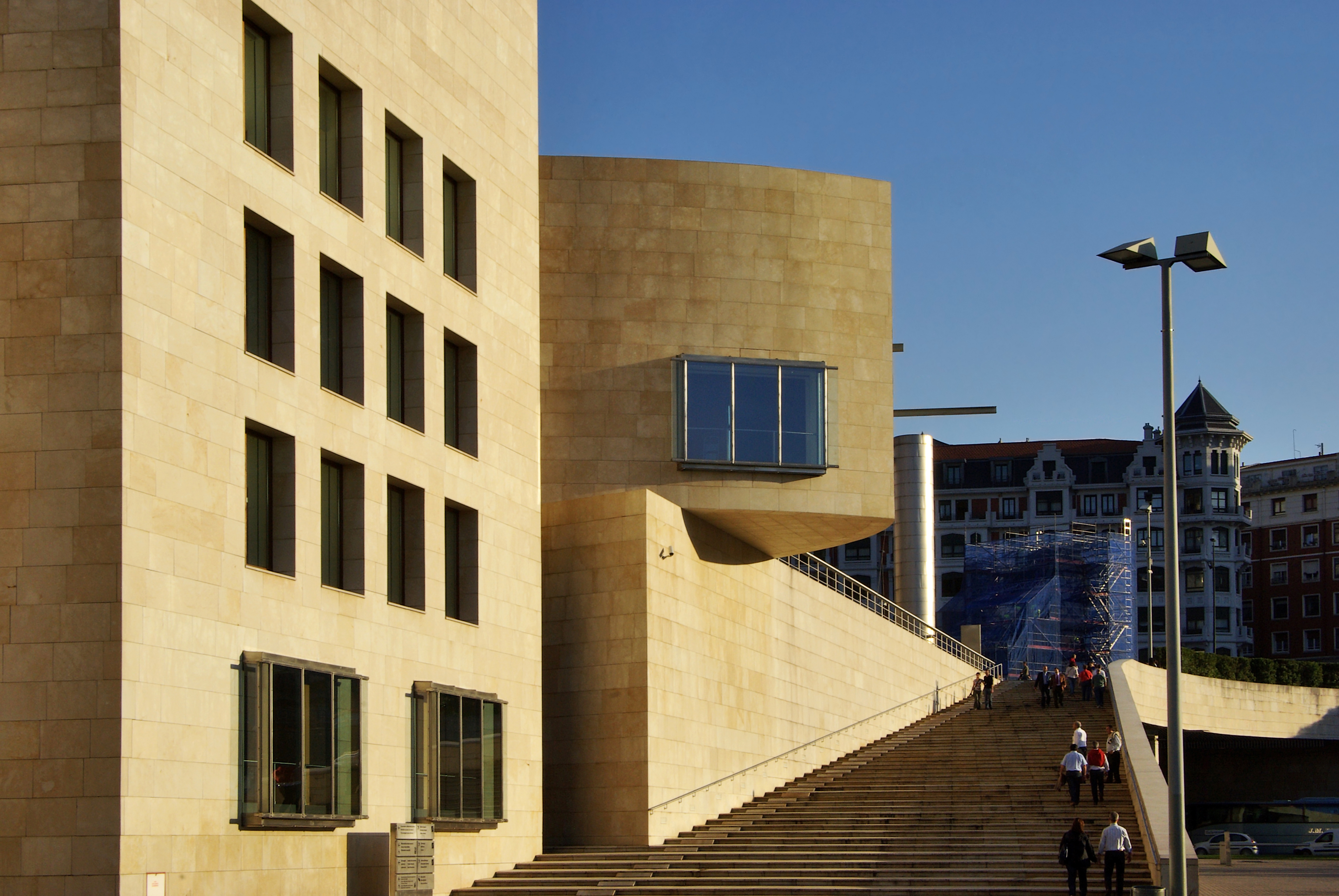
Guggenheim Museum Bilbao in Spain: Restoration work was carried out on limestone and steel using epoxy resin bondings.

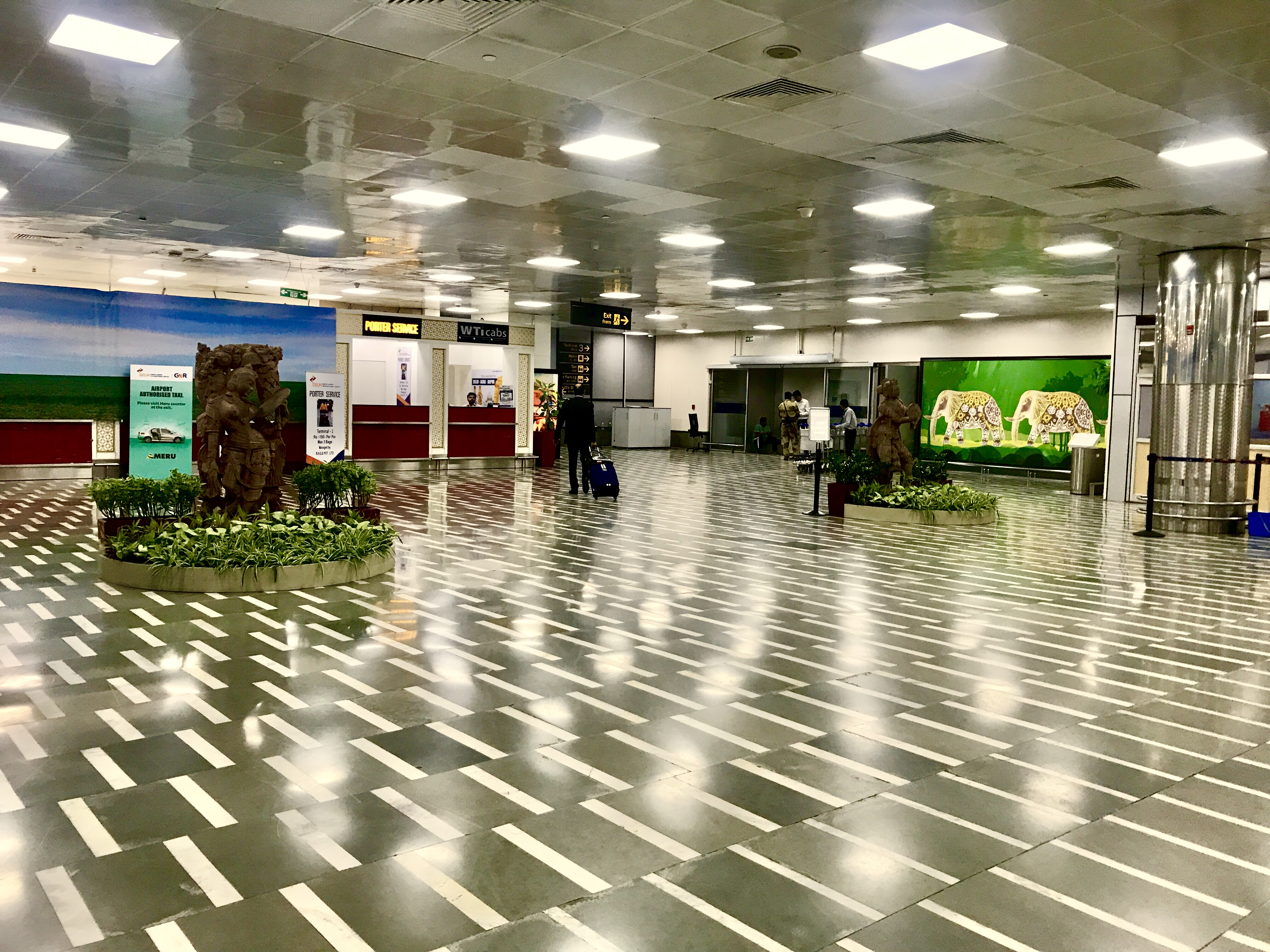
Indira Gandhi International Airport in India: 25,000 m² of floor surfacing was treated with stone cleaners and stain protection agents by Akemi.

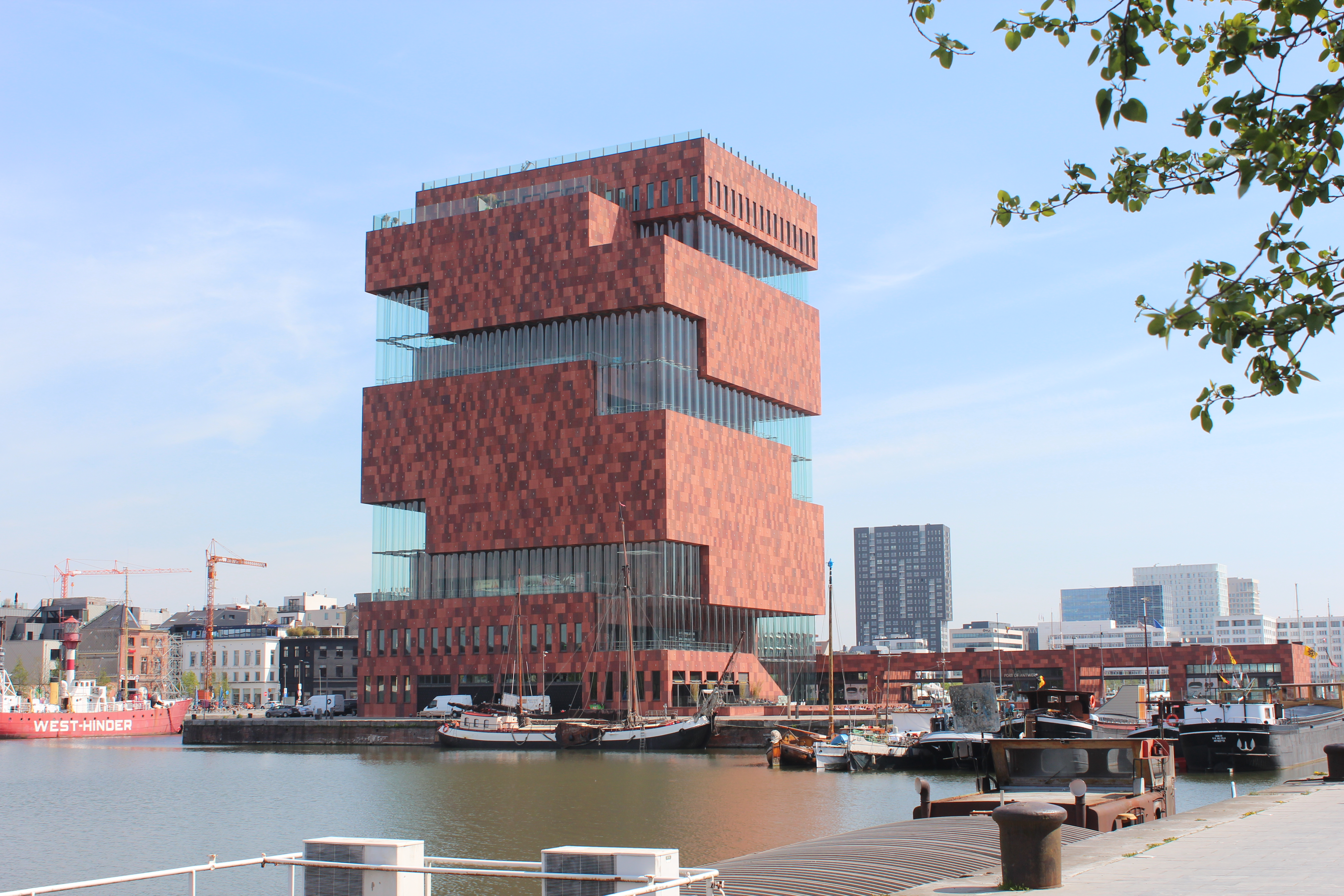
Museum aan de Stroom in Belgium: A large number of curtain wall panels made of natural stone were joined together by means of friction-locked bonding using Akemi adhesives.

== Participation at trade fairs ==
In addition to the fair Nuremberg Trade Fair in Nuremberg, Germany, Akemi also participates at the following fairs abroad:

Europe

- Marmormacc, Verona in Italy
- Contruma, Budapest in Hungary
- Stone, Poznań in Poland
- Cevisama, Valencia in Spain

Outside of Europe

- The International Surface Event in Las Vegas in United States
- Xiamen International Stone Fair, Xiamen in China
- India Stone Mart, Jaipur in India
- Marble, İzmir in Turkey
- Expo Revistir, São Paulo in Brazil
- The Big 5, Dubai in den United Arab Emirates
- Amr – Auto Repair Maintenance Car Repair, Beijing in China
