= Sulwhasoo =

South Korean costmetics brand

Sulwhasoo 설화수
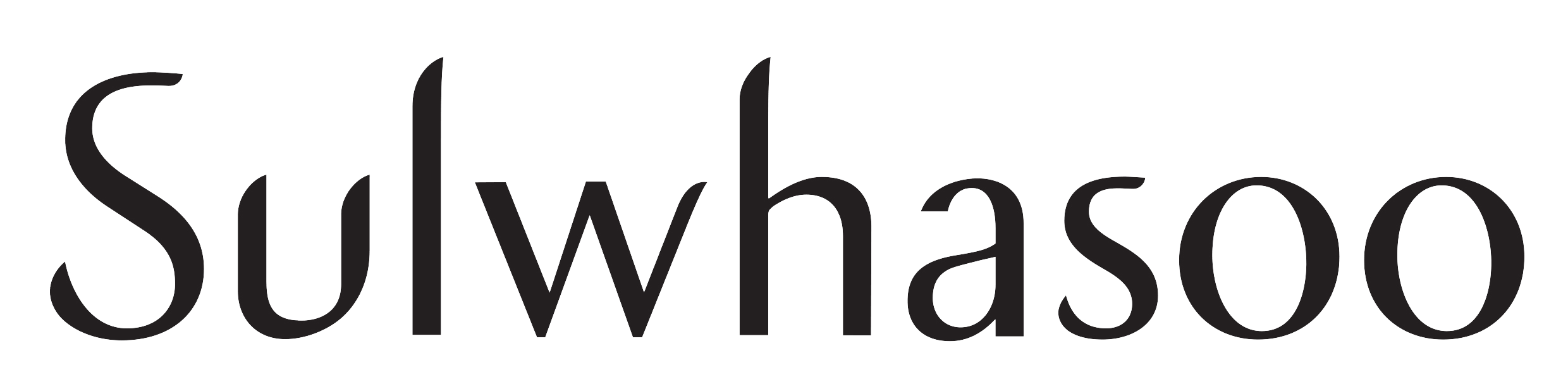
- Product type: Skincare
- Produced by: Amorepacific Corporation
- Country: South Korea
- Introduced: 1997
- Markets: Asia, North America, Europe, Australia
- Ambassador: Im Yoon-ah (2025)
- Website: www.sulwhasoo.com

Sulwhasoo (Korean: 설화수; Hanja: 雪花秀) is a South Korean skincare and cosmetics brand launched by Amorepacific Corporation in 1997. Seolhwa (Hanja: 雪花) means a plum blossom that blooms in the snow. It is a brand that uses Korean traditional herbal ingredients as its main components and releases products that combine them with modern skincare science.

== Ambassadors ==
- 2025: Im Yoon-ah (Girl's Generation)
- 2024: Choi Hwa-jung
- 2023: Tilda Swinton
- 2022: Rosé (Blackpink)
- 2021: Taeyeon (Girl's Generation)
- 2019: Angelababy
- 2018: Song Hye-kyo
