= Vinhomes =

Vietnamese commercial real estate developer

- Trade name: Vinhomes JSC
- Type: Public
- Traded as: HOSE: VHM
- ISIN: VN000000VHM0
- Industry: Real estate development
- Founder: Pham Nhat Vuong
- Headquarters: Hanoi, Vietnam
- Area served: Vietnam
- Owner: Vingroup; GIC Private Limited; Vietnam Enterprise Investments iShares MSCI Frontier 100
- Website: vinhomes.vn

Vinhomes JSC is the largest commercial real estate developer in Vietnam. Founded as a subsidiary of Vingroup, the company was spun off in 2018 and 10% of shares sold in an IPO. After the first day of trading, the company was already the second largest public company in Vietnam, behind parent company Vingroup.

Vinhomes develops property in 40 cities across Vietnam and owns 16,000 hectares (62 sq mi) of land in Vietnam. It is among others the owner of the tallest building in Vietnam, Landmark 81.

== Ownership ==
Vinhomes major shareholders include:

- Vingroup (66.6%)
- Government of Singapore Private Ltd. (5.74%)
- KKR Viking Asia Holdings II fund (4.6%)
