= Lotte Group =

South Korean and Japanese corporate group

- Native name: ロッテグループ; 롯데그룹
- Industry: Confectionary, beverages, hotels, retail, construction, entertainment
- Founded: August 15, 1948; 78 years ago
- Founder: Shin Kyuk-ho
- Areas served: Worldwide
- Key people: Shin Kyuk-ho; Shin Dong-bin
- Website: www.lotte.co.jp www.lotte.co.kr

Lotte Group is a corporate group started by Zainichi Korean businessman Shin Kyuk-ho in South Korea on June 15, 1948, starting with the South Korean Lotte Co., composed of Lotte Holdings (Japan) and Lotte Corporation (South Korea). Shin expanded Lotte to his ancestral country, South Korea, with the establishment of Lotte Confectionery in Seoul on April 3, 1967.

== Name ==
The source of the company's name is neither Korean nor Japanese, or even Chinese, but German. Shin Kyuk-ho was impressed with Johann Wolfgang von Goethe's The Sorrows of Young Werther (1774) and named his newly founded company Lotte after the character Charlotte in the novel. ("Charlotte" is also the name of premium auditoriums in movie theatres run by Lotte.) Lotte's current marketing slogan in Japan is "The sweetheart of your mouth, Lotte" (お口の恋人,ロッテ, Okuchi no koibito, Rotte).

== Operations ==
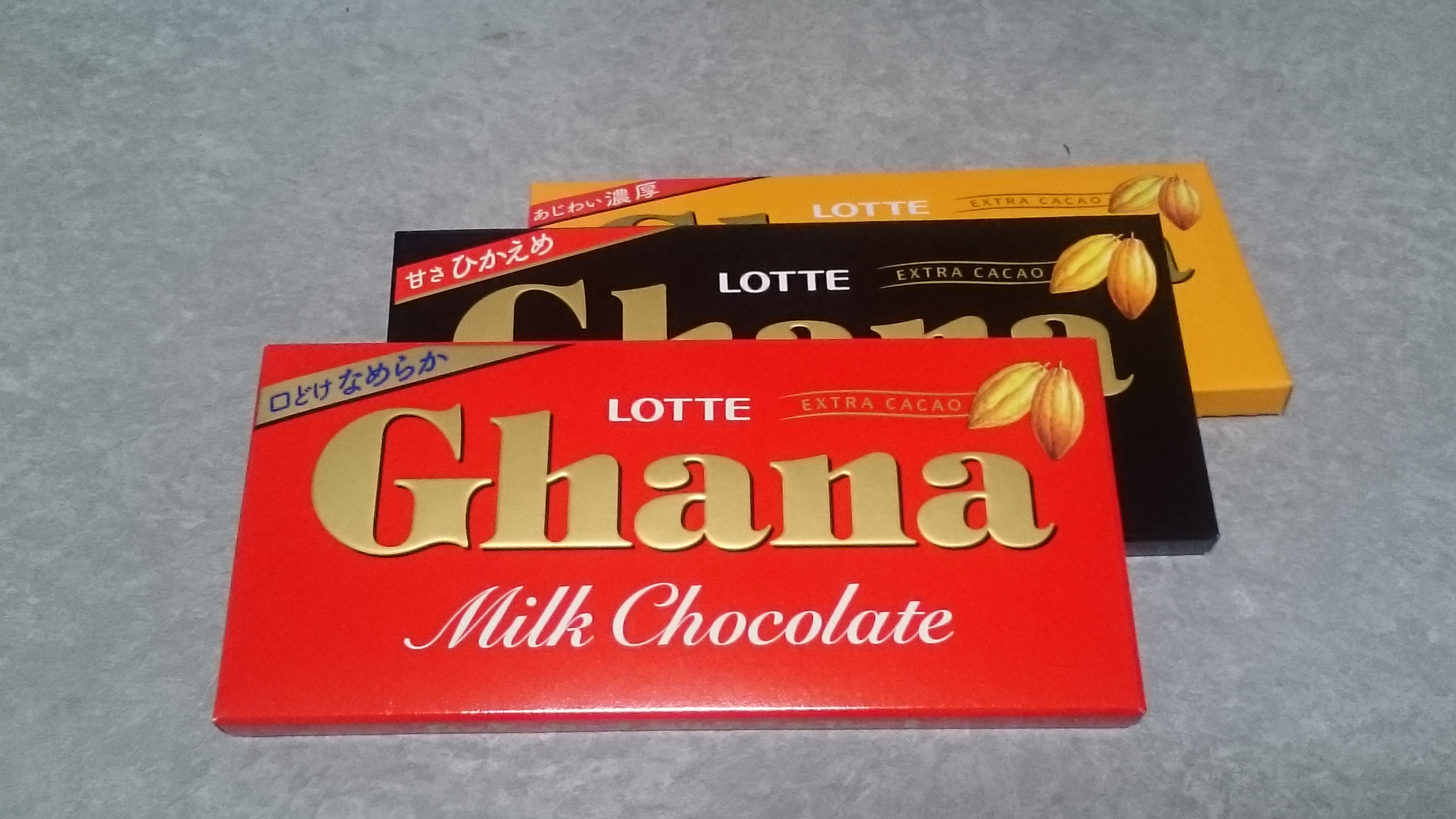
Lotte Ghana Chocolate

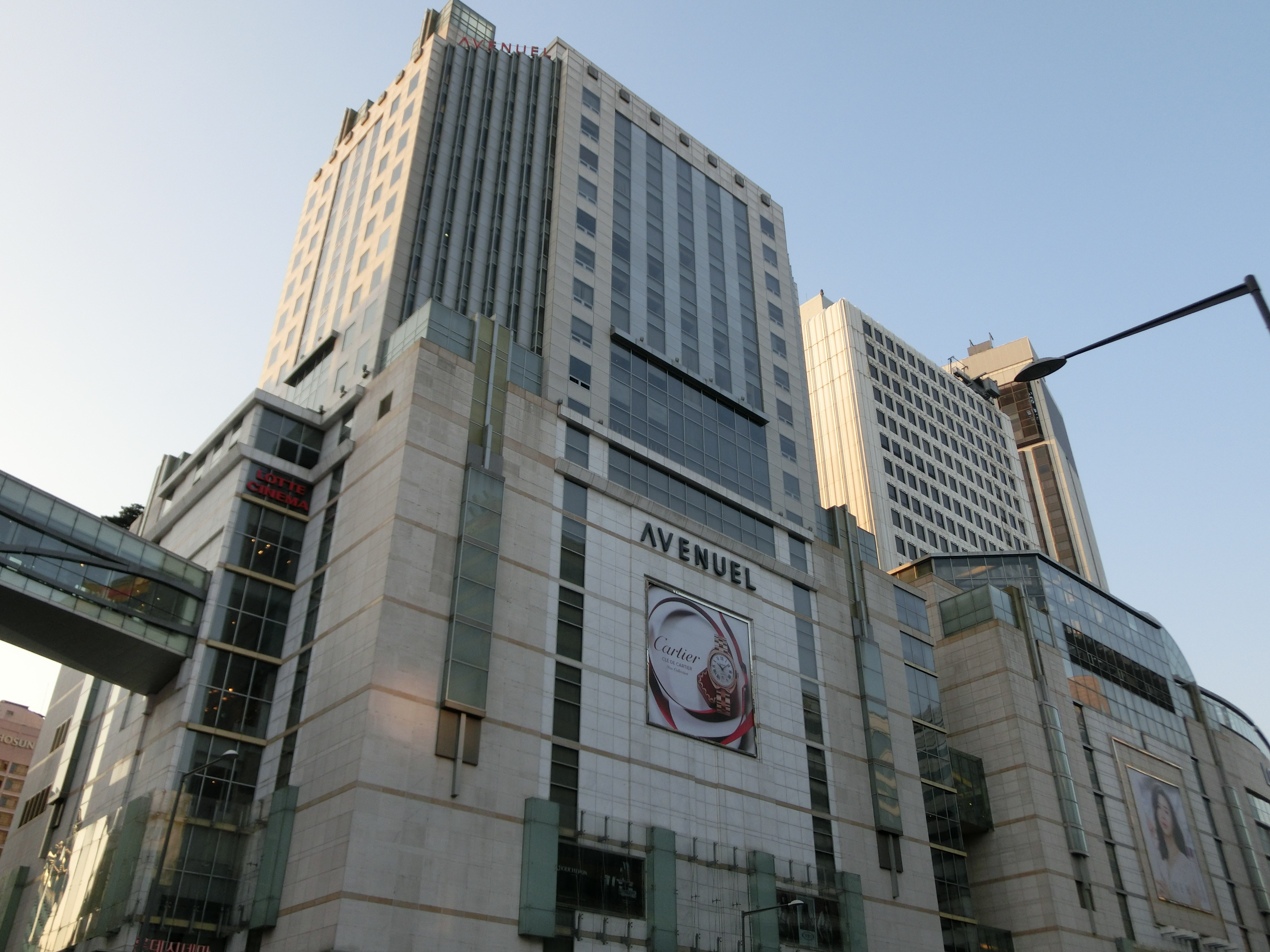
Lotte Department Store in Seoul

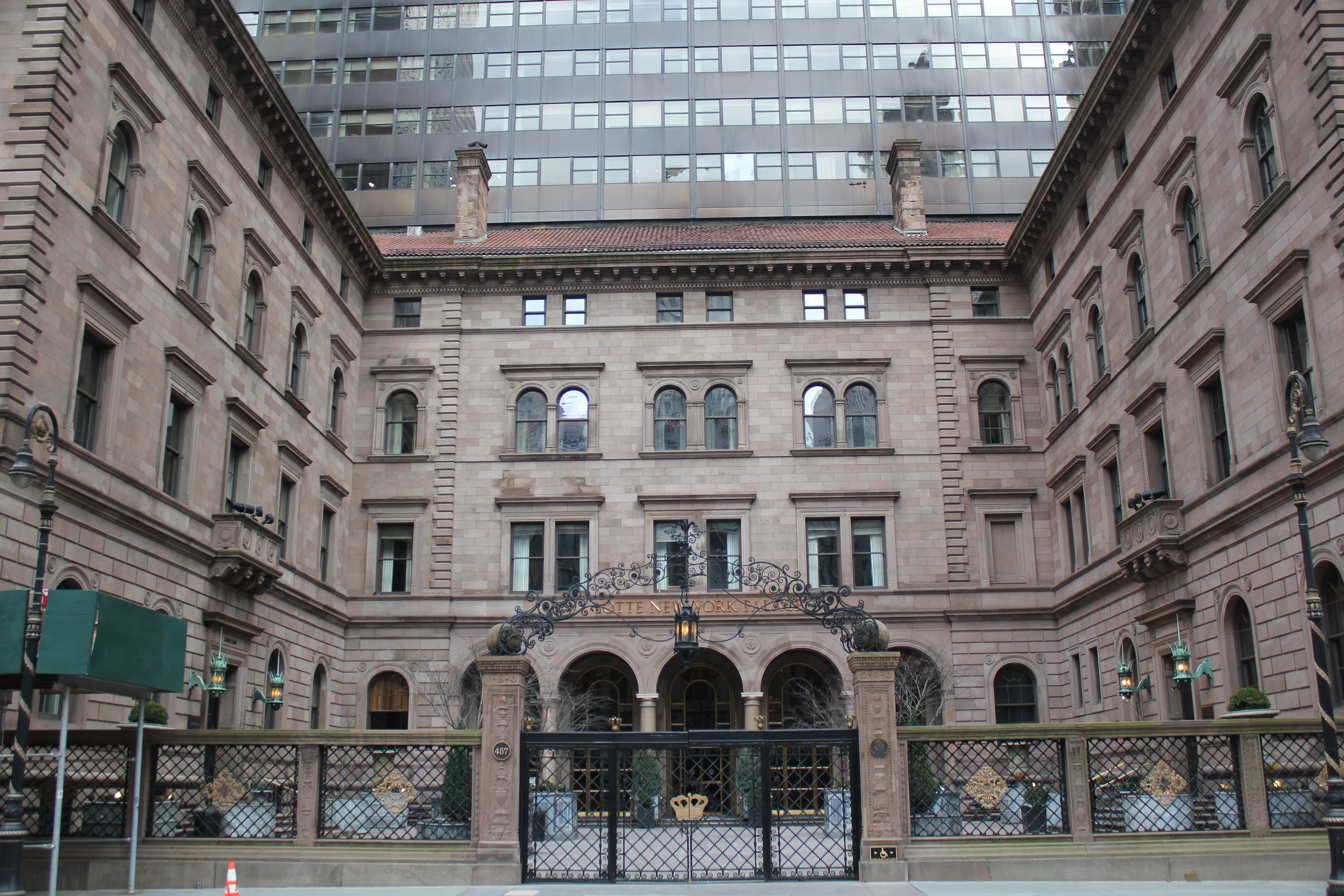
Lotte New York Palace Hotel

Lotte Corporation – is located in Songpa-gu, Seoul and Lotte Holdings Co., Ltd. in Shinjuku, Tokyo. It is controlled by the founder Shin Kyuk-Ho's extended family.

=== Business ===
Lotte Group's major businesses are food, retail, chemical, construction, manufacturing, tourism, service, finance, etc.

- Food: Lotte Confectionery, Lotte Chilsung, Lotte Liquor, Lotte Asahi Liquor, Lotte GRS, and others.
- Retail/Entertainment: Lotte Department Store, Lotte Shopping, Lotte Hi-Mart, Lotte Super, Lotte On, Lotter Korea Seven, FRL Korea, Lotte Cultureworks and others.
- Chemical/construction/manufacturing: Lotte Construction, Lotte Chemical, Lotte Fine Chemical, Lotte MCC, Lotte E&C, Lotte Aluminium, Lotte Ineos Chemical, Korea Fujifilm, and others.
- Tourism/service/finance: Lotte Global Logistics, Lotte Rental, Lotte Resort, Lotte Duty Free, Lotte World, Lotte Property & Development, Lotte Capital, Lotte Hotels & Resorts, Lotte Giants, Daehong Communications, Lotte Hotel Busan, Lotte International, and others

=== Sports ===
Lotte also owns professional baseball teams.

- Chiba Lotte Marines in Japan (1971–present)
- Lotte Giants in Busan, South Korea (1982–present).

=== Lotte R&D Center ===
- Korea R&D Center : 201, Magokjungang-ro, Gangseo-gu Seoul, South Korea
- Japan R&D Center : Saitama, Saitama Prefecture, Japan

== Controversies ==
See Lotte Corporation - Controversies.

== See also ==
- Lotte Corporation
- Lotte World Tower
- Shin Dong-bin, also known as Akio Shigemitsu
- Chaebol
