= Lotte Chilsung =

South Korean beverage manufacturer

Lotte Chilsung Beverage Co., Ltd.

- Headquarters in Seoul
- Native name: 롯데칠성음료
- Type: Public
- Traded as: KRX: 005300
- Founded: May 1950; 76 years ago (original); December 1974; 51 years ago (current form)
- Headquarters: Seoul, South Korea
- Key people: Yun gie Park
- Parent: Lotte Corporation
- Website: lottechilsung.co.kr

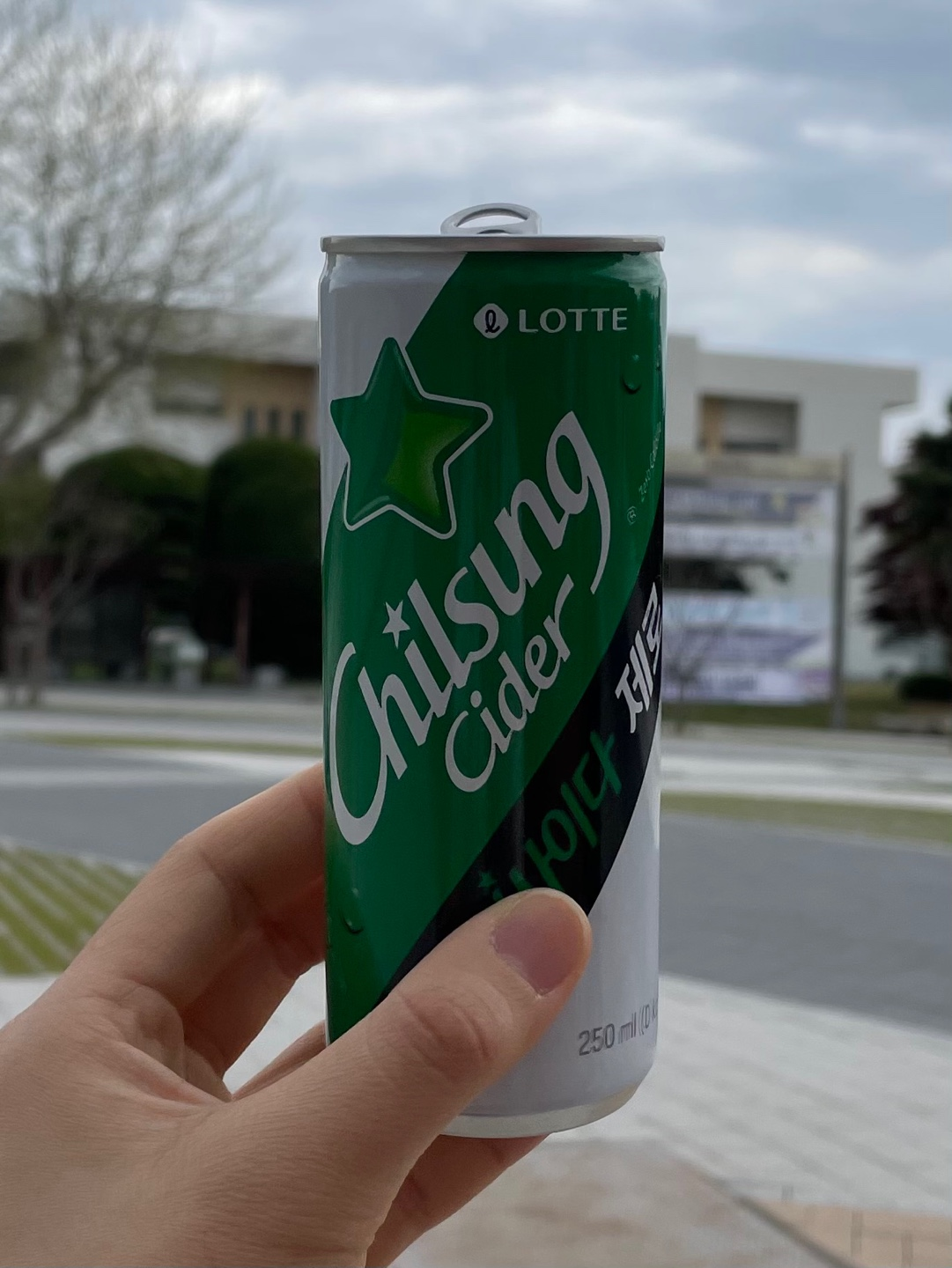
Chilsung Cider Zero

Lotte Chilsung Beverage Co., Ltd. (Korean: 롯데칠성음료) is a drink manufacturer in South Korea affiliated with Lotte Corporation. The company's name, Chilsung (Korean: 칠성; Hanja: 七星), signifies "Big Dipper" or seven stars, and its logo displays seven stars aligned in a row.

== History ==
Chilsung was founded in May 1950, then known as the Dongbang Beverage Company, and began with the launch of Chilsung Cider, a lemon-lime soft drink.

In 1967, they became Hanmi Foods Industry Co., then changing to Chilsung Hanmi Foods Corporation in 1973, eventually becoming the Chilsung Beverage Company. In 1975, the company acquired Busan Joint Beverage Corporation and signed a technology partnership agreement with PepsiCo in 1976.

In 1985, it was appointed the official beverage supplier for the 1986 Seoul Asian Games and 1988 Seoul Olympics, merged with Lotte Brewery in July 1986 and introduced CIP in December. In 1987, the Opo plant became the first in the industry to receive the KS mark.

By 2009, Chilsung products accounted for 36.7% of the Korean beverage market, compared to Coca Cola's 17.6%. and rebranded it as Lotte Liquor BG and built a logistics centre in Gwangmyeong, Gyeonggi-do, and acquired PepsiCo Products Philippines Inc (PCPPI) in 2010 and merged with Lotte Liquor BG the following year.

As Lotte founder Shin Kyuk-ho's health was deteriorating, his sons vied for control of the conglomerate. The fraternal feud hit a peak in 2015 when eldest son Dong-joo was removed from his position as Vice President of Lotte Holdings and his younger brother Shin Dong-bin assumed control. News of the leadership struggle created doubts about Lotte's future, and Lotte Chilsung Beverage's market value dropped 6.85% in August.

In 2016, amidst a police probe into embezzlement, Lotte Group companies lost a combined market value of ₩1.21 trillion (US$902.8 million) in just four days, with Lotte Chilsung's shares falling by 3.93% in a single day.

In February 2018, Chairman Shin Dong-bin was convicted on charges of bribery as part of the 2016 South Korean political scandal and sentenced to 2.5 years' incarceration. After serving for 234 days, an appeals court released him from prison, and he went back to his duties as Chairman shortly after. When news of his release broke, Lotte Group's market value was boosted by 4.2%.

In 2018, Chilsung Beverage was fined ₩105.4 million (US$78,640.52) by the Securities & Futures Commission of Financial Services for underreporting the losses of an affiliate. It was found that the drinks company masked net losses of ₩21.4 billion (US$15.97 million), reporting them as just ₩2.76 billion (US$2.06 million).

== Corporate governance ==
As of October 2023.

Shareholder	Stake (%)	Flag
Lotte Corporation	45.00%	South Korea
Lotte Aluminium	7.64%	South Korea
Lotte Scholarship Foundation	5.41%	South Korea
Shin Young-ja	2.66%	South Korea
Lotte Holdings	1.18%	Japan
Shin Dong-bin	0.47%	South Korea
National Pension Service	10.09%	South Korea
VIP Asset Management	5.25%	South Korea

== Products ==
=== Chilsung Cider ===
It is a carbonated beverage released on May 9, 1950, by Lotte Chilsung. By the end of 2013, Lotte had sold over 18.5 billion bottles of Chilsung Cider. In December 2019, they had to retire the iconic green bottle due to new government regulation about PET plastic. The bottles are now clear.

=== Cola ===
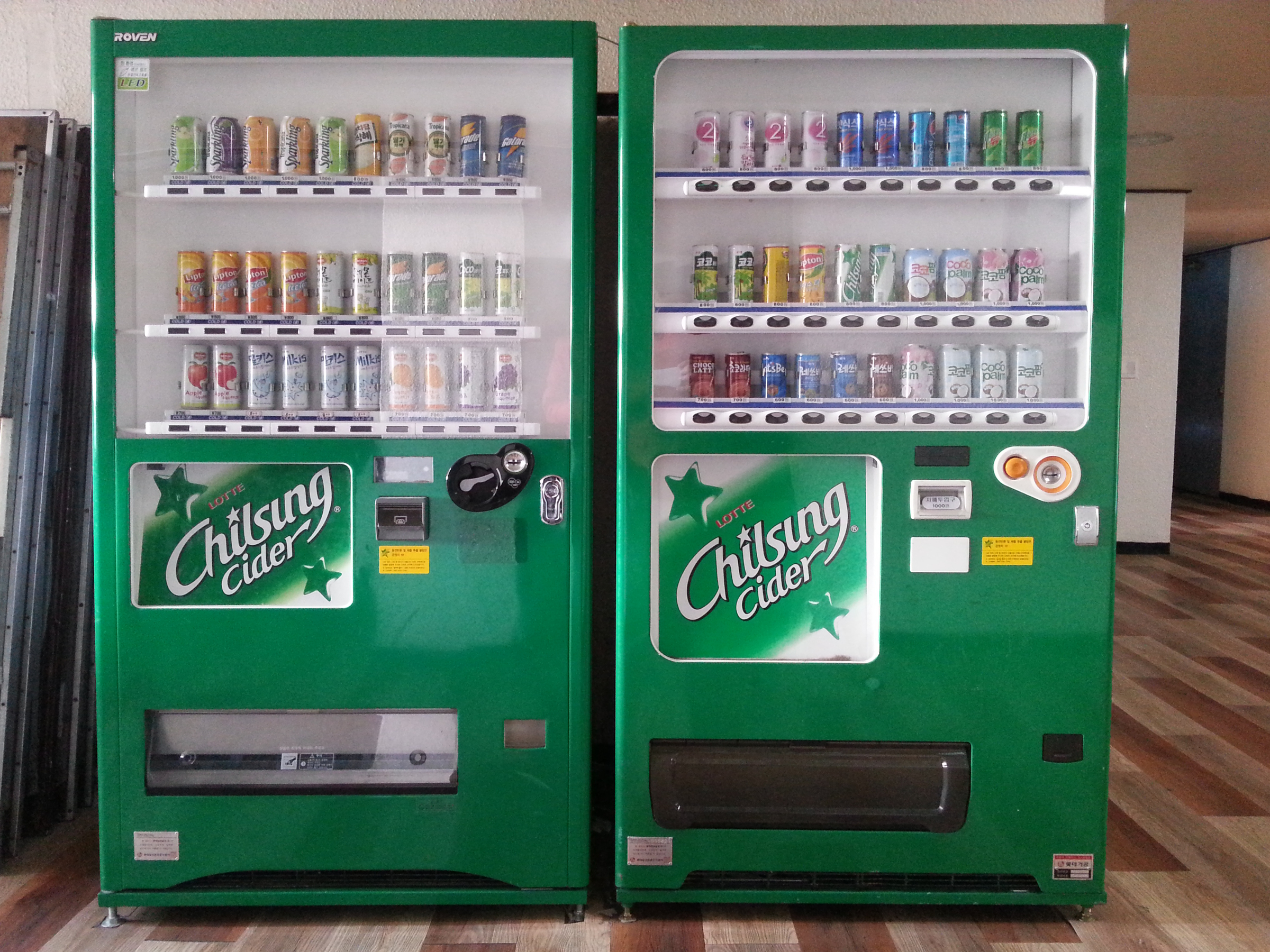
Vending machines with Chilsung Cider advertisement

American military presence as a result of the Korean War in the 1950s led to carbonated beverages appearing in South Korea for the first time. Chilsung released their own version of Cola in 1961, prior to Coca-Cola's official entry into the Korean market. It was first named Speci Cola, but then changed to Chilsung Cola to match its sister product Chilsung Cider, but this has since been discontinued.

Nowadays, Lotte Chilsung does not produce their own cola but instead bottles & distributes Pepsi Cola across Korea.

=== Juices ===
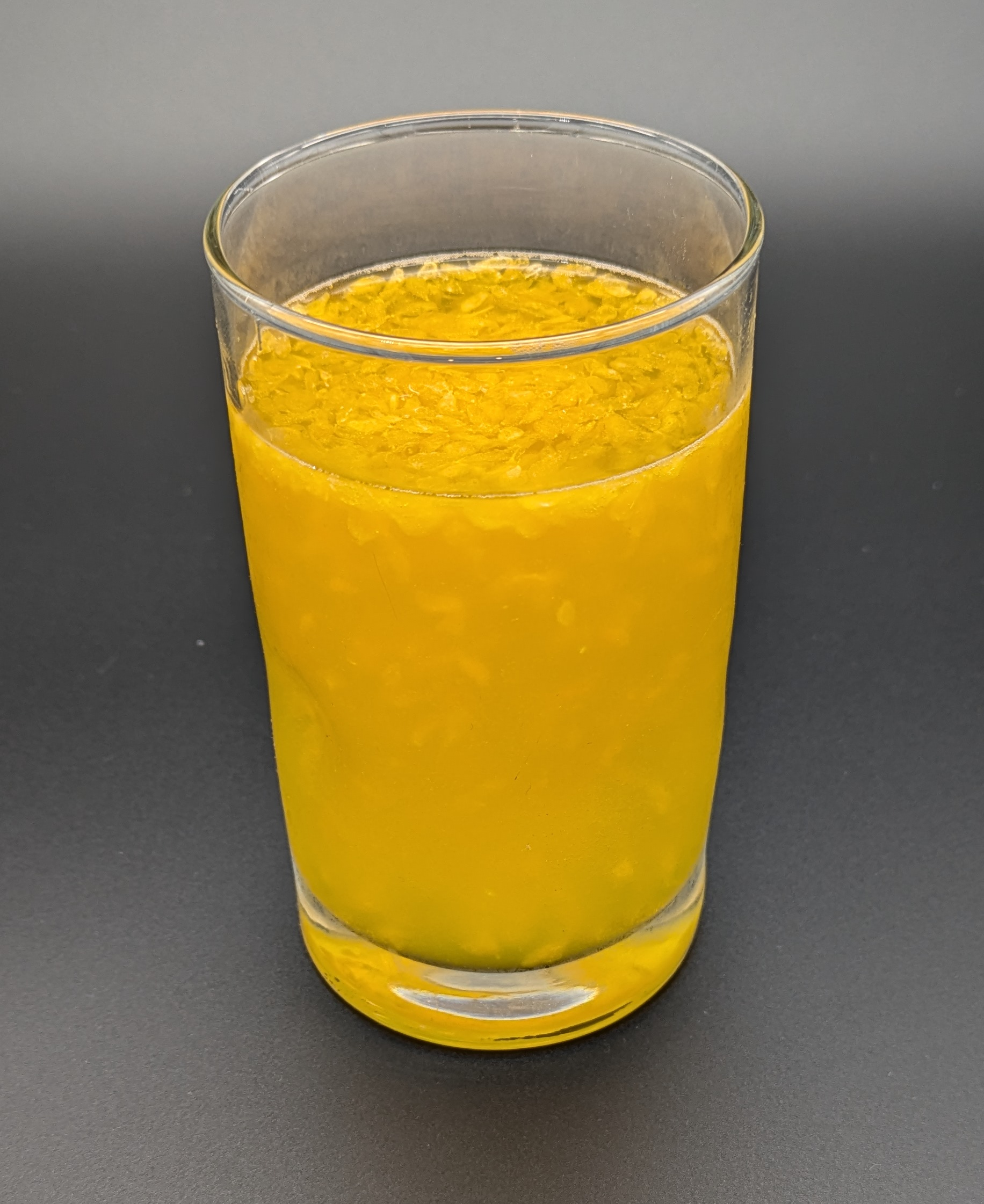
Sac Sac, an orange drink produced by Lotte Chilsung

Lotte Chilsung Beverage currently produces a range of natural fruit juices in orange, grape, apple, tangerine, pear, and mango flavors. In 1982, the company established a partnership with US-based, Del Monte, and now manufactures the Premium Orange and Del Monte Cold products. In 2009, the license for Tropicana was acquired and Tropicana Homemade style blends and other popular choices were produced.

=== Coffee and tea ===
The lineup in coffee include Let's Be, South Korea's No. 1 canned coffee; Cantata, a coffee blend made with Arabica beans from plantations worldwide; and black tea drinks Ceylon Tea and Lipton.

=== Other beverages/bottled water ===
Other beverages range from soy milks to traditional beverage and health drinks. Other varieties in the catalog include the sports drink Gatorade, the carbonated water Trevi, the purified water Icis, and France-imported Evian and Volvic.

=== Alcoholic drinks ===
Lotte Chilsung Beverage has been marketing Scotch Blue, Korea's local whiskey brand, along with fruit liquor, traditional Mirin, and other alcoholic beverages. Other alcoholic drinks include soju, cheongju Baekhwasubok, plum liquor Seoljungmae Plus, and South Korean wine Majuang.

Their soju brand Chum-Churum (Korean: 처음처럼; MR: ch'ŏŭmch'ŏrŏm; lit. 'like the first time') is the world's first soju made from alkaline-reduced water. In 2021, the spirit brand recorded sales worth ₩41.9 billion (US$31.26 million) in 37 countries.

The new brand is the sugar-free diluted soju brand launched by Lotte Chilsung Beverage in September 2022. At the time of its release, the product name is 'Chum-Churum Saero' (처음처럼 새로) and it is characterized by the addition of distilled soju to dilute soju to realize the flavor of distilled soju. He used unsweetened soju, took the clean image of Daegwallyeong, Gangwon-do as his brand concept, and tried to differentiate it from the existing soju by using the Gumiho character 'Saerogumi' as his mascot. From October 2023, it is operating as a sole brand of 'Saero' (새로).

== Expansion abroad ==
In 1966, Lotte Chilsung began exporting its Chilsung Cider to Vietnam. In 1989, Lotte Chilsung acquired a JAS mark. In the late 1990s, the manufacturer grew to be the largest beverage company in Asia, holding 35% of the domestic market share. Lotte Chilsung continued to grow signing a contract with Gatorade in 2001.

By the end of 2024, a Lotte spokesperson claimed overseas sales will make up more than 30% of Chilsung Beverage's total revenue.

=== US ===
In 2017, Lotte sought to expand their presence in the US beverage market, promoting Cider, Milkis and energy drink Hot6. They first began exporting their flavoured soju brand Chum-Churum Soonhari to the US in 2019.

=== China ===
In 2016, the South Korean government chose Lotte Skyhill Country Club as the site to install a new advanced anti-missile system, THAAD. This led to a sharp rise in anti-Korean sentiment in China, with much of the frustration targeted at Lotte. There were widespread boycotts and protests, with employees of a mall in Xuchang protesting Lotte as they sung the Chinese national anthem.

As a result, Lotte's Chinese business operations suffered greatly, with four out of six of Lotte Confectionery and Lotte Chilsung Beverage's factories in Beijing, Qingdao, Henan and Qingbai shutting down in Q1 2019. All of Chilsung Beverage & Lotte Confectionary's Chinese operations had ceased by 2019.

Despite this difficult diplomatic backdrop, Lotte Chilsung was still able to sell beverages into Chinese markets. In 2021, Chilsung sold more than 25 million cans of Milkis to Chinese markets, with Taiwan's consumption increasing 1100% in just a year. Between January and August 2022, they had exported over 10 million cans of Milkis to Taiwan.

=== The Philippines ===
Chilsung Beverage first entered the Filipino market in 2010 by purchasing a 34.4% stake in Pepsi Cola Products Philippines (PCPPI). In 2020, Chilsung paid ₩71.4 billion (US$53.27 million) to increase their stake to 72.9%. They completed their acquisition of the country's 2nd largest beverage producer in October 2023.

== Use of celebrities ==
As a Korean brand, Lotte Chilsung has incorporated many famous Korean entertainers into their advertising.

Singer Lee Hyori represented their soju brand Chum-Churum between 2007 and 2012. Then, a marketing campaign with the idol nicknamed the "nation's first love", Bae Suzy, ran from 2016 to 2018. BLACKPINK's Jennie led the brand from 2021 to 2023, with actress Han So-hee becoming their latest representative.

For one soju campaign with BLACKPINK's Jennie, Chum-Churum released a special promotional gift box which included Jennie photo cards, a Jennie mini cutout, a Jennie soju glass and a Soonhari Bluetooth microphone.

In 2014, Korean BBQ restaurant owner, Ham Sun-bok, went viral for making 'so-maek', a cocktail of beer and soju. Lotte made her a brand representative for Chum-Churum, reportedly signing a contract for more than ₩20 million (US$14,922.3).

In 2017, Chilsung Cider released an advertisement with actor Park Seo-joon and LABOUM singer Solbin. In 2023, actor Jung Hae-in became the face of Chilsung Cider.

In 2024, Lotte Chilsung Beverage's "Saero" is launching new animation content for their new product "Saero Apricot". Actors Park Ji-hoon and Kim Hye-yoon were selected as the endorsers and participated in dubbing the animation for the advertisement campaign.

== Antitrust violations ==
The Fair Trade Commission (FTC) fined Chilsung along with four other beverage producers for colluding to raise the prices of their products. The FTC reported that the companies co-ordinated price hikes four times between February 2008 and February 2009. Chilsung was fined ₩21.7 billion (US$16.19 million).

Just a few months later, Chilsung Beverage, in conjunction with three other companies, was found to have been forcing retailers to not lower the price of their products, receiving the largest fine of ₩500 million (US$373,057.49).

In 2021, Lotte Chilsung was fined almost ₩1 billion (US$746,114.98) by the Korean Fair Trade Commission for violating antitrust regulations.

== See also ==
- List of South Korean corporations
- Lotte Corporation
- Lotte Confectionary
- Lotte Holdings
- Lotte Group
