= Lotte Card =

Korean credit card company

Lotte Card 롯데카드
- Company type: Subsidiary
- Founded: December 12, 2002
- Headquarters: Seoul, Republic of Korea
- Products: Financial services
- Website: www.lottecard.co.kr

Lotte Card Co, Ltd. is a Korean credit card company. Headquartered in Seoul, Lotte Card has a partnership with Lotte Capital, and both companies are part of the Lotte Corporation. Lotte Card was established in December 2002 as a technical and business company licensed by American Express and Lotte Department Store.
