= Pineapple Island (Johor) =

Island in Johor Bahru, Johor, Malaysia

Native name: Pulau Nanas
- Interactive map of Pineapple Island

Geography
- Location: Strait of Johor
- Coordinates: 1°25′40″N 103°58′38″E
- Area: 0.12 km^{2} (0.046 sq mi)

Administration
- Malaysia
- State: Johor
- District: Johor Bahru
- Mukim: Plentong

Pineapple Island (Malay: Pulau Nanas) is an uninhabited island in Johor Bahru District, Johor, Malaysia. This island is located between Pasir Gudang and Tanjung Langsat along the Straits of Johor.

== See also ==
- Geography of Malaysia
