= Shin Dong-joo =

South Korean businessman (born 1954)

- 신동주
- Born: January 28, 1954 (age 72); Tokyo, Japan
- Other names: Shigemitsu Hiroyuki
- Citizenship: South Korea
- Education: Aoyama Gakuin University (bachelor's, master's)
- Occupation: Businessman
- Father: Shin Kyuk-ho

Korean name
- Hangul: 신동주
- Hanja: 辛東主
- RR: Sin Dongju
- MR: Sin Tongju

Japanese name
- Kanji: 重光宏之
- Hiragana: しげみつひろゆき
Transcriptions
- Revised Hepburn: Shigemitsu Hiroyuki

Shin Dong-joo (Korean: 신동주; born January 28, 1954), Japanese name Shigemitsu Hiroyuki (重光宏之), is a South Korean businessman based in Japan. The eldest son of Lotte Corporation founder Shin Kyuk-ho, he has served in various executive roles in Lotte and its related companies. He is chairman of Kōjunsha.

He is among the richest South Korean people; in April 2024, Forbes estimated his net worth as US$1.03 billion and ranked him 39th richest in the country.

== Biography ==
Shin was born in Tokyo, Japan on January 28, 1954. He is the eldest son of Lotte Corporation founder Shin Kyuk-ho through his father's second wife, ethnic Japanese woman Shigemitsu Hatsuko (重光初子). His younger brother is Shin Dong-bin. He gets his Japanese surname from his mother, and as he spends most of his time in Japan, is mostly known by his Japanese name.

He graduated from Aoyama Gakuin Senior High School in 1972. He received a bachelor's degree in 1976 and master's degree in 1978 from Aoyama Gakuin University. He also has a Master of Business Administration degree from Columbia Business School.

In 1978, he joined Mitsubishi Corporation. He joined Lotte Corporation in 1987, and became a director of the company in 1988. He became an executive director of the company in 1991, vice president in 2001, and then vice chairman of Lotte Holdings, a holding company of Lotte Corporation, in 2009. In 2011, he became vice chairman and president of Lotte International (롯데상사).

=== Rivalry with Shin Dong-bin and ousting ===
Dong-joo is seen as bitter rivals with his younger brother, Shin Dong-bin. Dong-joo was considered to be in charge of Japan and Dong-bin Korea. Dong-joo's management style was reportedly focused mostly on internal stability in Japan; this was possibly due to Japan's economic slowdown from the 1990s. By contrast, his younger brother aggressively acquired other companies during the same period. By the 1990s, Lotte's presence in Korea outgrew Lotte's presence in Japan; by 2013 Lotte had 15 times the revenue in Korea than in Japan.

According to Shin, the original plan for Shin Kyuk-ho's succession was that Dong-joo was to eventually take over the company. However, in January 2015, Dong-joo was dismissed from Lotte Holdings, to reported surprise from the press. This was reportedly because he was having business dealings in Korea, against the wishes of his father. Also, Dong-joo claimed that Dong-bin had been colluding with various Lotte Japan executives to undermine Dong-joo's influence in the company.

In July 2015, there was a reported reversal in the conflict; Dong-joo and his father flew to Japan, where they attempted to oust Dong-bin and five other executives. Dong-bin reportedly successfully resisted the ousting, leaving Dong-joo and his father with weaker influence in the company. By 2024, it was reported that Dong-joo had firmly "lost" the dispute with Dong-bin.

In a 2024 interview with Sisa Journal, he openly criticized his brother's leadership and decisions amidst Lotte's poor performance. He claimed his brother was unfit for leading the company. By that point, Dong-joo still held significant shares in Lotte's presence in Japan, which gave him some limited influence in the company. He mentioned that he was on such poor terms with his brother, that they had not spoken in person (other than in shareholder meetings) since January 2020.

== Personal life ==
In 1992, he married Jo Eun-ju (조은주), a Korean-American daughter of a businessman. They have one son together. By 2015, the family had houses in Japan and in South Korea. By 2024, he reportedly primarily lived in Japan, but often visited South Korea to take care of various duties. He is reportedly seen by the general public as more introverted than his brother, Dong-bin.
