= Shin Dong-bin =

South Korean business executive (born 1956)

- 신동빈
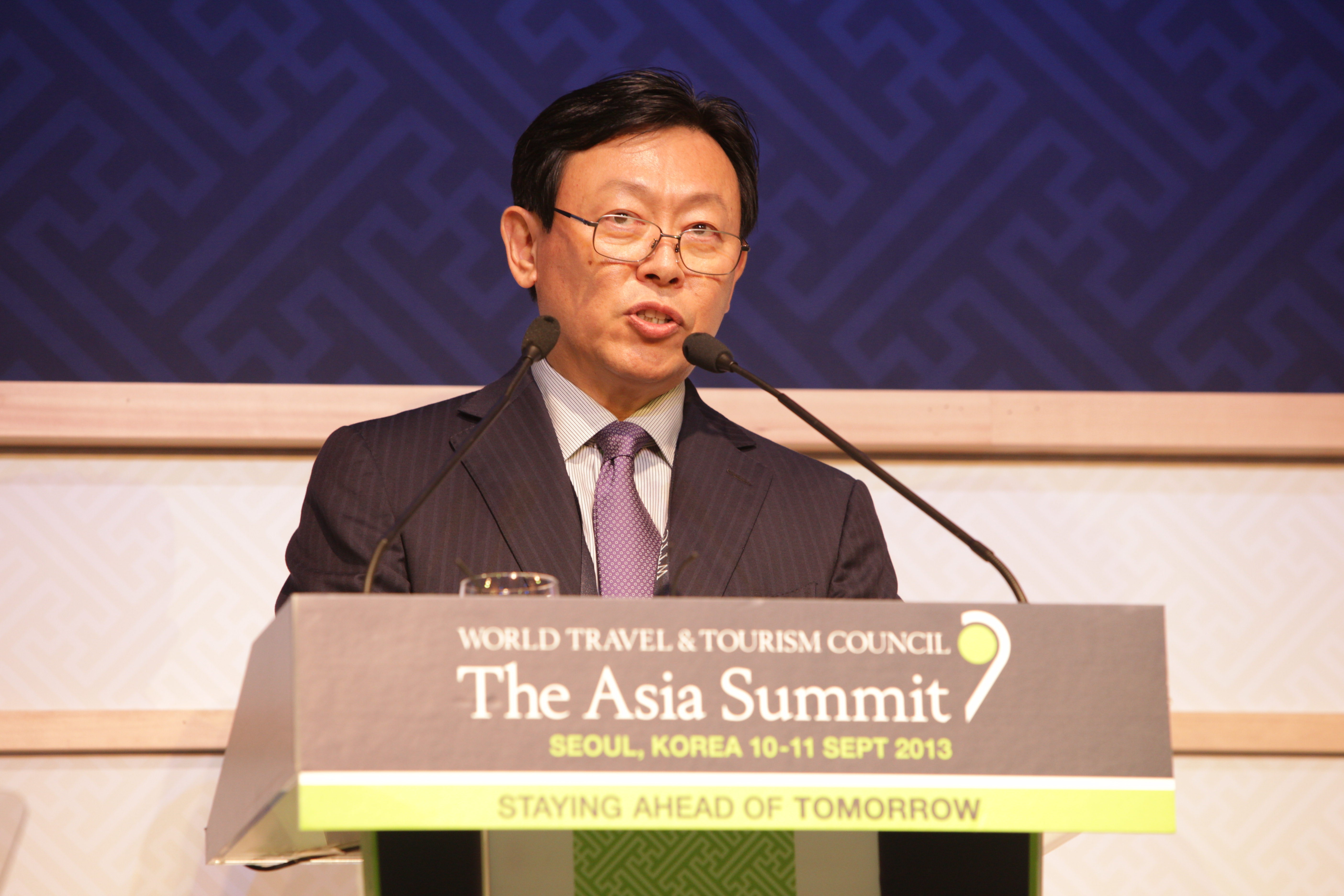
- Shin at the Asia Summit of World Travel & Tourism Council in Seoul, South Korea in September 2010
- Born: Akio Shigemitsu; 14 February 1956 (age 70); Tokyo, Japan
- Citizenship: Japan (1956–1995); South Korea (1996–present)
- Education: Aoyama Gakuin University (BA); Columbia University (MBA)
- Occupation: Business executive
- Title: Chairman of Lotte Group
- Spouse: Ogo Manami (m. 1985)
- Children: 3
- Parents: Shin Kyuk-ho (father); Hatsuko Shigemitsu (mother)
- Relatives: Shin Dong-joo (older brother); Shin Choon-ho (uncle); Shin Dong-won (cousin)

Korean name
- Hangul: 신동빈
- Hanja: 辛東彬
- RR: Sin Dongbin
- MR: Sin Tongbin
- Website: lotte.co.kr

Shin Dong-bin (Korean: 신동빈; born Akio Shigemitsu, 14 February 1956) is a South Korean business executive, and the chairman of Lotte Corporation since 2011.

== Early life and education ==
Born in Japan as Akio Shigemitsu (重光昭夫, Shigemitsu Akio). Shin is the second son of Shin Kyuk-ho (Takeo Shigemitsu), founder and first CEO of Lotte and his Japanese wife. He is the younger brother of Hiroyuki Shigemitsu (Korean name Shin Dong-joo), CEO of the Japanese Lotte Group.

Shin graduated from Aoyama Gakuin Elementary School, Middle School, and High School in Tokyo.

Shin graduated from Aoyama Gakuin University in Tokyo with a B.A. in economics in 1977 and from Columbia University with an MBA.

== Career ==
He started his career at Nomura Securities' London branch in 1980 and joined Lotte in 1988, when he started at Lotte Chemical.

In 2011, he became Chairman of Lotte Korea. Upon taking control of the group, Shin embarked on a series of mergers and acquisitions, including the acquisition of Hi-Mart (now Lotte Hi-Mart), Hyundai Logistics (now Lotte Global Logistics), The New York Palace Hotel (now Lotte New York Palace Hotel), and the chemical arm of Samsung - Samsung Fine Chemicals and Samsung BP Chemicals.

== Legal issues and convictions ==
On 22 December 2017, a Seoul district court handed down to Shin a two-year suspension of a jail sentence with embezzlement and breach of trust in October 2016.

On 13 February 2018, Shin was sentenced to 30 months in prison after the Seoul Central District Court found him guilty of charges stemming from Lotte's decision to give ₩7 billion (US$6.5 million) to Choi Soon-sil, a confidante of former President of South Korea Park Geun-hye, in exchange for government favors in providing a license to operate duty-free shop. On 5 October 2018, a South Korean appeals upheld Shin's conviction, but also agreed to suspend his sentence to time already served, thus setting him free.

== Other activities ==
=== Philanthropy ===
Shin sits on the Board of Overseers of Columbia Business School. In 2013, he donated $4 million to the school to found the Shin Dong-bin fellowships. A professional skier, Shin is the Chairman of the Korean Ski Association and pledged 60 billion won to the PyeongChang Olympics.

== Personal life ==
Shin is married to a Japanese woman named Ogo Manami, who is of aristocratic descent. The couple have three children, who all live in Japan. Both his office and his residence are located in Lotte World Tower, South Korea's tallest building.

Shin was engaged in a number of disputes with his brother, Shin Dong-joo, over the control of Lotte and gained control of the company after a long legal battle.
