= Lotte Chemical Titan =

Company

Lotte Chemical Titan Holding Bhd
- Formerly: Titan Chemicals Corp Sdn Bhd
- Company type: Private Limited Company
- Industry: Chemicals, manufacturing
- Founded: 1989
- Headquarters: Level 29, 1 Powerhouse, 1, Persiaran Bandar Utama, Bandar Utama, 47800 Petaling Jaya, selangor, Malaysia
- Key people: Jang Seon Pyo, President & CEO
- Products: plastics
- Number of employees: 1,000
- Parent: Lotte Chemical
- Website: www.lottechem.my

Lotte Chemical Titan Holding Sdn Bhd engages in the ownership and operation of polypropylene plants, polyethylene plants, ethylene crackers, and aromatic plants. It offers high-density polyethylene (HDPE), Low-density polyethylene (LDPE), and Linear low-density polyethylene (LLDPE) for various kinds of applications, room household goods to automotives products. The company also manufactures low-density polyethylene for injection molding for cosmetic containers, bottle closures, and food containers, and is based in Pasir Gudang, Malaysia.

== History ==
Titan Chemicals began as a joint-venture in which Datuk Chao Ting Tsung, through The Chao Group International and Permodalan Nasional Berhad (PNB), through its wholly owned subsidiary, PNB Equity Resources Corporation (PERC), have major interest.

Titan Chemicals commenced construction of its first facility in Malaysia, a RM300 million polypropylene plants, in 1989. At present, Titan Chemicals own 10 integrated process facilities in Pasir Gudang and Tanjung Langsat in the southern state of Johor which has a total nameplate production capacity of over 2.4 million tonnes annually of olefins, polyolefins and other associated products.

The company was formerly known as Titan PP Polymers (M) Sdn Bhd and changed its name to Titan Petchem (M) Sdn. Bhd. in December 2004.

Titan Chemicals Corp. Sdn. Bhd. was listed on the Main Board of Bursa Malaysia as TITAN 5103 in 2005. Its stock is included in the KL Composite Index.

In March 2006, Titan Chemicals acquired PT. TITAN Petrokimia Nusantara, Indonesia’s first and largest Polyethylene plant in the country. Situated in Merak, Indonesia, PT. TITAN adds 3 Polyethylene plants to Titan Chemicals' portfolio.

In November 2010, Titan Chemicals was acquired by Honam Petrochemical Corp.

== Production facilities ==
Production Capacity
Plant	Original Nameplate Capacity (KTA)	Actual Capacity (KTA)	Technology	Location
Cracker 1 – Olefins	345	442	Stone & Webster	Pasir Gudang, Malaysia
Cracker 2 – Olefins	495	667	Stone & Webster	Pasir Gudang, Malaysia
Polypropylene Plant 1	100	180	Basell Polyolefins	Pasir Gudang, Malaysia
Polypropylene Plant 2	200	300	Basell Polyolefins	Pasir Gudang, Malaysia
LLDPE / HDPE Swing Plant	200	220	Union Carbide	Pasir Gudang, Malaysia
LDPE Plant	200	230	ExxonMobil	Tanjung Langsat, Malaysia
HDPE Plant	100	115	Mitsui	Tanjung Langsat, Malaysia
Aromatics Plant	170	200	Krupp Uhde	Pasir Gudang, Malaysia
Butadiene Plant	100	100	BASF	Pasir Gudang, Malaysia
Metathesis Plant	115	115	ABB Lummus	Pasir Gudang, Malaysia
LLDPE/HDPE Swing Plant	450	450	BP Innovene	Merak, Indonesia
BOPP	38	38	Tenter	Merak, Indonesia
Total	2,513	3,057		

== Acquired by Honam Petrochemical Corp ==
South Korea’s Honam Petrochemical Corp has received full acceptance to take Titan Chemicals Corp private, by acquiring the remaining 27.25% shares it does not own at RM2.35 apiece. Titan shares, for which acceptance had been received by Honam after the posting date and up to 5 pm closing date on 24 December 2010, were listed as 27.25%, representing 470.89 million shares, according to Titan in a filing. On 1 November 2010, Titan received a notice of unconditional takeover offer from Honam to acquire all remaining shares (excluding treasury shares) following Honam's sale and purchase agreement in July to buy a 72.32% stake, or 1.25 billion shares, in Titan Chemicals for RM2.94 billion.
