= Ghana (chocolate bar) =

Brand of chocolate

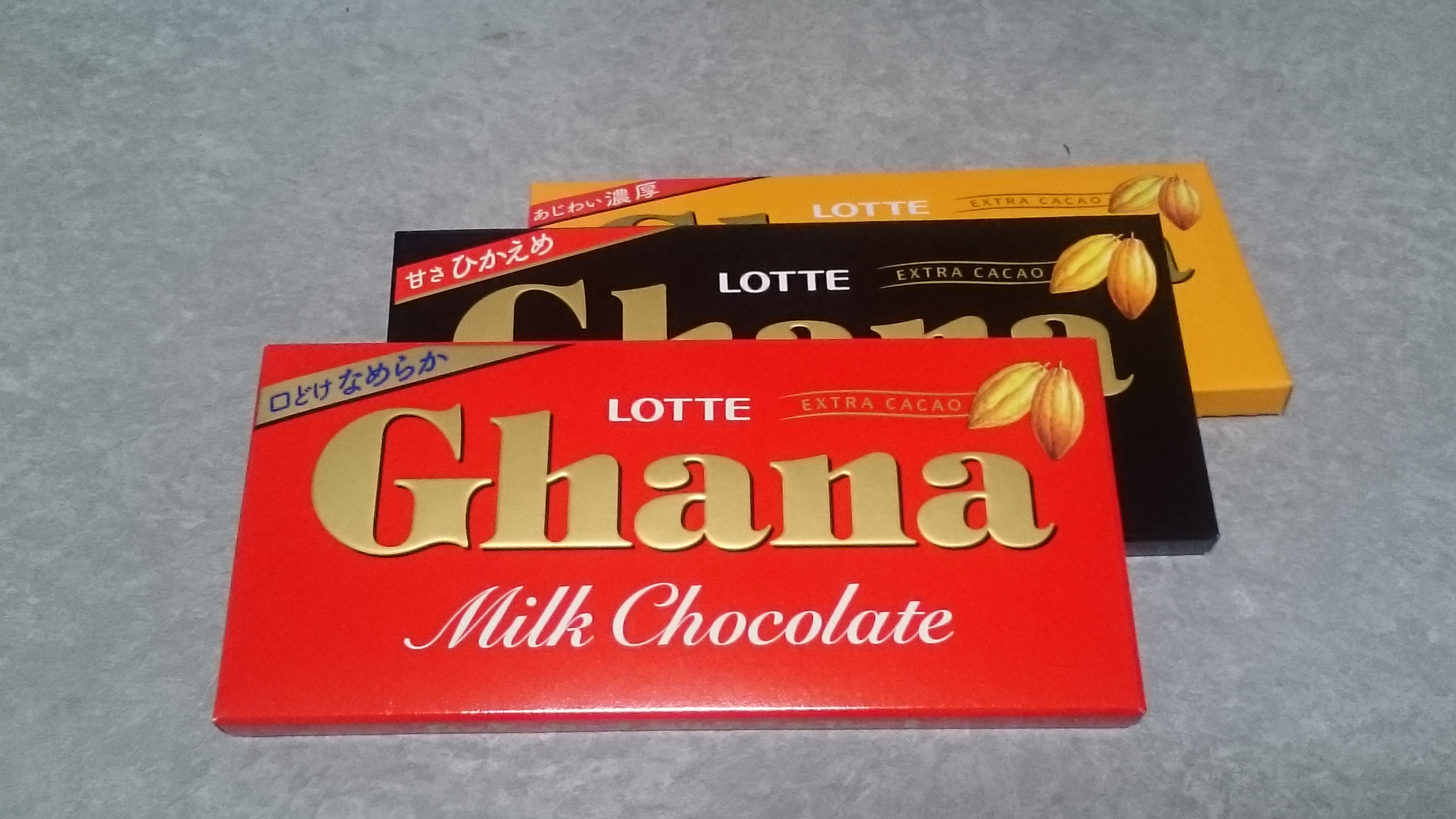
- Ghana milk, dark, and roasted milk chocolate bars

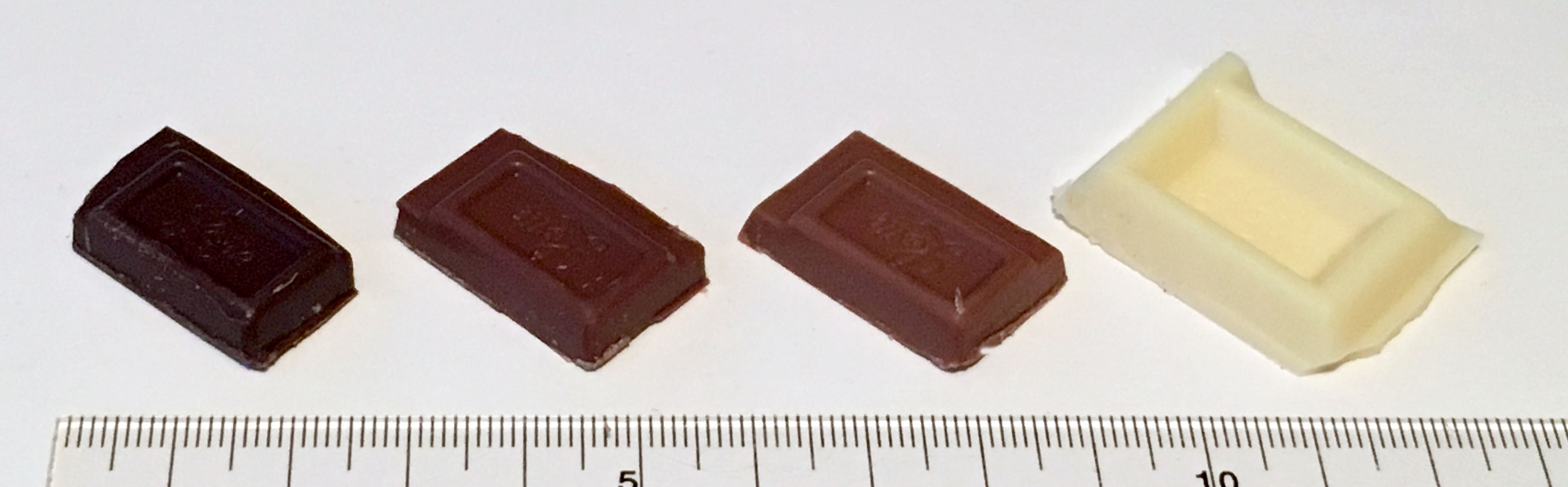
- Blocks of the dark, milk, roasted milk, and white chocolate bars
- Product type: Chocolate
- Produced by: Lotte Wellfood
- Country: Japan and South Korea
- Introduced: 1964 (in Japan)
- Markets: Worldwide

Ghana (Japanese: ガーナ; Korean: 가나) is a brand of chocolate manufactured by Lotte Wellfood (formerly Lotte Confectionery) in Japan since 1964 and in South Korea since 1975. It is a flagship product of the company. Its name pays homage to the nation of Ghana, one of the world's largest exporters of cocoa beans, from which chocolate is made.

== See also ==
- Chocolate in Japan
- List of chocolate bar brands
- Category:Ghanaian chocolate companies, for chocolate made in Ghana
