= Lotte Hotels & Resorts =

South Korean luxury hotel chain

- Company type: Division
- Industry: Hospitality
- Founded: 1973; 53 years ago
- Headquarters: Seoul, South Korea
- Area served: South Korea, Russia, United States, Japan, Vietnam, Myanmar, Uzbekistan
- Key people: Ahn Sei-jin (President and CEO)
- Parent: Lotte Corporation
- Website: lottehotel.com

Lotte Hotels & Resorts is a South Korean luxury hotel chain operated by Lotte Hotel Co., Ltd., the hospitality arm of Lotte Corporation. The company was founded in May 1973. Starting with the opening of Lotte Hotel Seoul in 1979, luxury chain hotels opened in Jamsil, Busan, Jeju Island, and Ulsan. The first business hotel, Lotte City Hotel Mapo, opened in April 2009, and the first overseas chain, Lotte Hotel Moscow, opened in June 2010. On December 8, 2011, the second business hotel, Lotte City Hotel Gimpo Airport, opened within the Lotte Mall Gimpo Airport complex.

== History ==
Lotte Group was originally established in Japan and expanded into South Korea with the establishment of Lotte Confectionery Co., Ltd in 1967. Lotte Group consists of over 60 business units in such diverse industries as candy manufacturing, beverages, hotels, fast food, retail, financial services, heavy chemicals, electronics, IT, construction, publishing, and entertainment.

Lotte Hotels & Resorts was founded in 1973 with the opening of the first hotel of the chain Lotte Hotel Seoul, located in Jung District. It features the Royal Suite, which is 460 square meters large. It has a direct connection to a supermarket and department store, via an escalator in the lobby.

The company expanded its business in 1988 and opened Lotte Hotel World, a recreational complex which consists of a large indoor theme park, an outdoor amusement park, an island linked by monorail, shopping malls, a hotel, a Korean folk museum, sports facilities, and movie theatres in one area.

The third hotel, Lotte Hotel Busan, was opened in 1997 in Busan, South Korea's largest port city and second largest metropolis after Seoul.

Lotte Hotel Jeju was opened in 2000 on Jeju Island, which has a temperate climate, natural scenery, and beaches. Jeju is a popular tourist destination for South Koreans as well as visitors from other parts of East Asia. Two years later the chain opened Lotte Hotel Ulsan.

Lotte City Hotel Mapo—named a "City Hotel" to signify its focus on business travelers—was the sixth hotel, opening in 2009 in Mapo District, Seoul. It has a Tokyo, Japan, sister hotel called Lotte City Hotel Kinshicho.

The first chain hotel abroad, Lotte Hotel Moscow, was opened in Russia in 2010.

Lotte City Hotel Gimpo Airport was opened in Banghwa-dong, Gangseo District, Seoul, on December 8, 2011. The hotel is situated within the Lotte Mall Gimpo Airport complex. The 8-story building houses 197 rooms, 1 buffet restaurant, banquet halls, business conference rooms, fitness center, and coin laundry.
