= List of largest chemical producers =

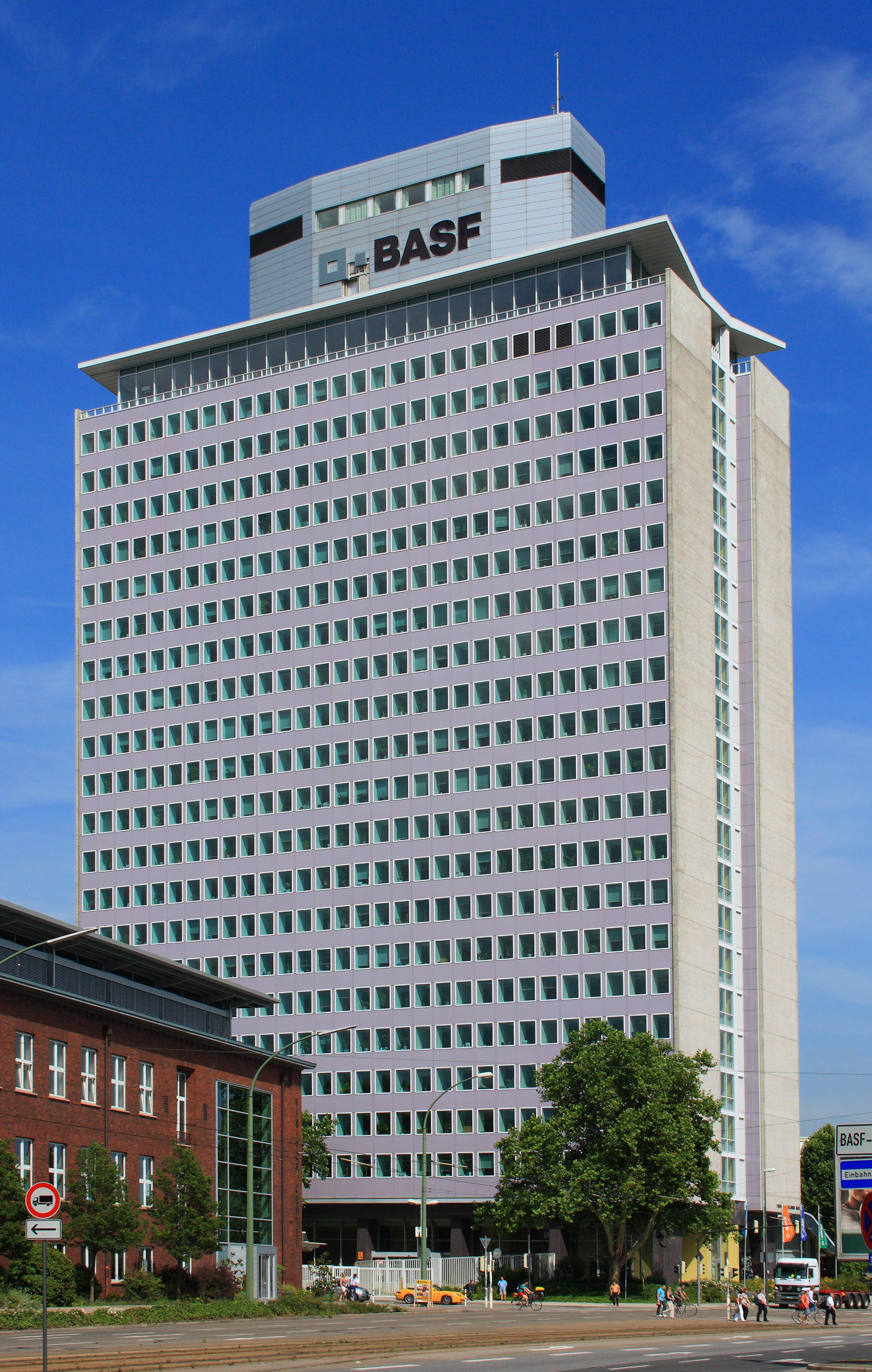
The Friedrich-Engelhorn-Hochhaus, headquarters of BASF from 1957 to 2013

Chemical & Engineering News publishes an annual list of the world's largest chemical producers by sales, excluding formulated products such as pharmaceutical drugs and coatings. In 2018, sales of the top fifty companies amounted to US$951,000,000,000, an increase of 11.8% compared to the top fifty producers of 2017. The American Chemistry Council estimated that global chemical sales in 2014 rose by 3.7% to US$5,389,000,000,000.

In 2018, Forty-eight of the companies on the list disclosed chemical profits, which totaled US$110,100,000,000, an increase of 1.3% from 2017. The average profit margin for chemical operations for these companies was 9.6%.

== Top fifty producers by sales (2021) ==
Rank	Company	Chemical sales in 2021 (USD millions)^{[A]}	Change from 2020 (percent)	Headquarters
1	BASF	92,982	▲32.9%	Germany, Ludwigshafen am Rhein
2	Sinopec	65,848	▲31.9%	China, Beijing
3	Dow	54,968	▲42.6%	United States, Midland, Michigan
4	SABIC	43,230	▲50.1%	Saudi Arabia, Riyadh
5	Formosa Plastics	43,173	▲47.8%	Taiwan, Taipei
6	Ineos	39,937	▲121%	United Kingdom, London
7	Petrochina	39,693	▲41.7%	China, Beijing
8	LyondellBasell Industries	38,995	▲66.6%	United States, Houston, Texas
9	LG Chem	37,257	▲41.8%	South Korea, Seoul
10	ExxonMobil	36,858	▲59.6%	United States, Spring, Texas
11	Mitsubishi Chemical Group	30,719	▲24.8%	Japan, Tokyo
12	Hengli Petrochemical	27,961	▲31.9%	China, Suzhou
13	Linde	27,926	▲14.5%	Ireland, Dublin
14	Air Liquide	27,148	▲13.4%	France, Paris
15	Syngenta	24,900	▲20.9%	Switzerland, Basel
16	Reliance Industries	22,583	▲65.6%	India, Mumbai
17	Wanhua	22,561	▲98.2%	China, Yantai
18	Braskem	19,575	▲80.4%	Brazil, São Paulo
19	Sumitomo Chemical	19,176	▲24.7%	Japan, Tokyo and Osaka
20	Shin-Etsu Chemical	18,885	▲38.6%	Japan, Tokyo
21	Covestro	18,813	▲48.5%	Germany, Leverkusen
22	Toray Industries	17,856	▲20.9%	Japan, Tokyo
23	Evonik Industries	17,692	▲22.6%	Germany, Essen
24	Shell	16,993	▲45.0%	United Kingdom, London
25	DuPont	16,653	▼18.4%	United States, Wilmington, Delaware
26	Yara	16,617	▲43.4%	Norway, Oslo
27	Rongsheng Petrochemical	16,001	▲59.6%	China, Hangzhou
28	Lotte Chemical	15,827	▲48.2%	South Korea, Seoul
29	Mitsui Chemicals	14,681	▲33.1%	Japan, Tokyo
30	Indorama Ventures	14,626	▲41.2%	Thailand, Bangkok
31	Chevron Phillips Chemical	14,104	▲67.1%	United States, The Woodlands, Texas
32	Umicore	13,567	▲34.4%	Belgium, Brussels
33	Solvay	13,527	▲17.7%	Belgium, Brussels
34	Bayer	12,743	▲9.7%	Germany, Leverkusen
35	Mosaic	12,357	▲42.3%	United States, Plymouth, Minnesota
36	Nutrien	11,590	▲62.0%	Canada, Saskatoon
37	Arkema	11,261	▲20.7%	France, Colombes
38	Asahi Kasei	10,908	▲20.9%	Japan, Tokyo
39	DSM	10,888	▲13.5%	Netherlands, Heerlen
39	Hanwha Solutions	10,888	▲22.8%	South Korea, Seoul
41	Eastman Chemical	10,476	▲23.6%	United States, Kingsport, Tennessee
42	Johnson Matthey	10,412	▼2.48%	United Kingdom, London
43	Air Products	10,323	▲16.6%	United States, Allentown, Pennsylvania
44	Eurochem	14,269	▲22.6%	Switzerland, Zug
45	Borealis	10,164	▲26.0%	Austria, Vienna
46	PTT Global Chemical	16,521	▲51.7%	Thailand, Bangkok
47	Sasol	9,011	▲10.8%	South Africa, Johannesburg
48	Tongkun Group	8,996	▲28.5%	China, Tongxiang
49	Lanxess	8,940	▲23.8%	Germany, Cologne
50	Hengyi Petrochemical	8,858	▲66.8%	China, Hangzhou

== Top fifty producers by sales (2018) ==
Rank	Company	Chemical sales in 2018 (USD millions)^{[A]}	Change from 2017 (percent)	Headquarters
1	DowDuPont	85,977	37.6	(United States) Midland, Michigan, US
2	BASF	74,066	2.4	Ludwigshafen, Germany
3	Sinopec	69,210	22.4	Beijing, China
4	Sabic	42,120	12	Riyadh, Saudi Arabia
5	Ineos	36,970	2.1	(United Kingdom) London, UK
6	Formosa Plastics^{[B]}	36,891	13.8	Taipei, Taiwan
7	ExxonMobil Chemical	32,443	13.1	(United States) Irving, Texas, US
8	LyondellBasell Industries	30,783	8.7	(United States) Houston, Texas US/ Rotterdam, Netherlands
9	Mitsubishi Chemical	28,747	7.1	Tokyo, Japan
10	DuPont	25,935	37.6	(United States) Wilmington, Delaware, US
11	LG Chem	25,637	9.7	Seoul, South Korea
12	Reliance Industries	25,167	37.3	Mumbai, India
13	PetroChina	24,849	n/a	Beijing, China
14	Air Liquide	24,322	2.8	Paris, France
15	Toray Industries	18,651	8.7	Tokyo, Japan
16	Evonik Industries	17,755	4.2	Essen, Germany
17	Covestro	17,273	3.4	Leverkusen, Germany
18	Bayer^{[C]}	16,859	49	Leverkusen, Germany
19	Sumitomo Chemical	16,081	8.7	Tokyo, Japan
20	Braskem	15,885	17.7	São Paulo, Brazil
21	Lotte Chemical	15,051	4.2	Seoul, South Korea
22	Linde plc	14,900	30.3	(United States) (Germany) Dublin, Ireland
23	Shin-Etsu Chemical^{[C]}	14,439	10.6	Tokyo, Japan
24	Mitsui Chemicals	13,432	11.6	Tokyo, Japan
25	Solvay	13,353	3.7	Brussels, Belgium
26	Yara	12,928	13.8	Oslo, Norway
27	Chevron Phillips Chemical	11,310	24.8	(United States) The Woodlands, Texas, US
28	DSM	10,951	7.4	Heerlen, Netherlands
29	Indorama	10,747	21.2	Jakarta, Indonesia
30	Asahi Kasei	10,654	8.1	Tokyo, Japan
31	Arkema	10,418	5.9	Colombes, France
32	Syngenta	10,413	12.6	Basel, Switzerland
33	Eastman Chemical	10,151	6.3	(United States) Kingsport, Tennessee, US
34	Borealis	9,852	10.2	Vienna, Austria
35	SK Innovation	9,719	14.4	Seoul, South Korea
36	Mosaic	9,587	29.4	(United States) Tampa, Florida, US
37	Huntsman	9,379	12.2	(United States) The Woodlands, Texas, US
38	Wanhua Chemical	9,172	14.1	Yantai, China
39	PTT Global Chemical	8,969	15.7	Bangkok, Thailand
40	Ecolab^{[C]}	8,964	11	(United States) Saint Paul, Minnesota, US
41	Air Products & Chemicals	8,930	9.1	(United States) Allentown, Pennsylvania, US
42	Westlake Chemical	8,635	7.4	(United States) Houston, US
43	Lanxess	8,505	-25.5	Cologne, Germany
44	Nutrien	8,130	75.9	Saskatoon, Canada
45	Umicore^{[C]}	8,113	27.1	Brussels, Belgium
46	Sasol	8,110	4.2	Sandton, South Africa
47	Tosoh	7,803	4.7	Tokyo, Japan
48	Johnson Matthey^{[C]}	7,579	16.1	(United Kingdom) London, UK
49	DIC	7,296	2	Tokyo, Japan
50	Hanwha Chemical^{[D]}	7,273	3.3	Seoul, South Korea
51	Celanese	7,155	16.5	(United States) Irving, Texas, US

A. Some figures converted at 2018 average exchange rates of US$1.00 = R$3.6513 Brazilian, CN¥ 6.609, €0.8462, ₹67.16, ¥110.1, ₩1,099.29, ر.س 3.75, R 13.2255, CHF 0.9784, NT$30.129, and ฿32.303.
B. Estimate by Chemical and Engineering News.
C. Sales include a significant amount of non-chemical products.
D. Chemical sales less administrative expenses and cost of sales.

== Largest companies since 1988 ==
Since Chemical & Engineering News began keeping records in 1989, BASF has been the world's largest chemical producer by annual sales more frequently than any other company. The other companies that have headed the list are Dow Chemical, DowDuPont (which broke up into Dow, a new DuPont, and Corteva Agriscience in 2019), Hoechst (which merged with Rhône-Poulenc in 1999 and is now a subsidiary of Sanofi), ICI (acquired by AkzoNobel in 2008) and Bayer.

Year	Company	Chemical sales (USD millions)^{[A]}	Ref.
1988	Bayer	22,694	
1989	BASF	17,122	
1990	BASF	18,520	
1991	ICI	18,127	
1992	BASF	22,883	
1993	Hoechst	16,682	
1994	Hoechst	19,702	
1995	BASF	22,030	
1996	BASF	26,519	
1997	BASF	27,047	
1998	BASF	27,740	
1999	BASF	31,250	
2000	BASF	30,791	
2001	Dow Chemical	27,805	
2002	Dow Chemical	27,609	
2003	Dow Chemical	32,632	
2004	Dow Chemical	40,161	
2005	Dow Chemical	46,307	
2006	BASF	49,516	
2007	BASF	65,037	
2008	BASF	70,485	
2009	BASF	54,817	
2010	BASF	70,391	
2011	BASF	85,603	
2012	BASF	79,760	
2013	BASF	78,615	
2014	BASF	78,698	
2015	BASF	63,749	
2016	BASF	60,653	
2017	BASF	69,195	
2018	DowDuPont	85,977	
2019	BASF	66,400	
2020	BASF	67,500	
2021	BASF	92,982	

A. Foreign currencies converted to USD using average exchange rates of that year.
