= Lotte Chemical =

South Korean chemical company

Lotte Chemical Corporation
- Native name: 롯데케미칼 주식회사
- Formerly: Honam Petrochemical (1976–2012)
- Type: Public
- Traded as: KRX: 011170
- Industry: Chemicals
- Founded: 1976; 50 years ago
- Headquarters: Lotte World Tower, Seoul, South Korea
- Parent: Lotte Corporation
- Subsidiaries: Lotte Chemical Titan
- Website: www.lottechem.com

Lotte Chemical Corporation (Korean: 롯데케미칼 주식회사) is a chemical company headquartered in Seoul, South Korea. Lotte Chemical is one of the largest chemical companies in the world by revenue. Lotte Chemical manufactures synthetic resins and other chemical products used for various industrial materials.

== History ==
Lotte Chemical was established as Honam Petrochemical in 1976 and became part of Lotte Group after three years. After being integrated into Lotte, the company acquired various companies for business expansion. In 2010, Honam took over Malaysia's Titan Chemicals for US$1.27 billion to expand its business to the Southeast Asian market. In 2012, Honam merged with KP Chemical and was renamed Lotte Chemical. Lotte Chemical acquired Samsung's chemical businesses, including Samsung SDI's chemical unit, Samsung Fine Chemicals, and Samsung BP Chemicals for 3 trillion won in 2016.

On November 12, 2025, PTA Global Holding Limited acquired the LOTTE Chemical Pakistan Limited (PSX: LOTTE), Pakistan's sole producer of purified terephthalic acid (PTA). This acquisition marks the full exit of Lotte Chemical Corporation from the Pakistani market, concluding its ownership that began in 2009.

In July 2026, the Korean government approved a petrochemical industry restructuring plan that includes the integration of Yeochun NCC and Lotte Chemical's Yeosu operations, along with the reduction of NCC production capacity.

== Products ==
Lotte Chemical produces ethylene, polyethylene, and polypropylene by using naphtha extracted from crude oil.

== Subsidiary ==
- Lotte Chemical Titan
- Lotte Energy Materials
- Lotte Chemicals U.S.A.
- Hantok Chemicals
- Lotte Fine Chemicals
- KP Camtech

== Corporate governance ==
As of 7 April 2023.

Shareholder name	Stake	National flags
LOTTE Corporation	25.31%	South Korea
Lotte Property & Development	20.00%	South Korea
LOTTE Co., Ltd.	9.19%	Japan
National Pension Service	7.42%	South Korea
LOTTE Culture Foundation	0.03%	South Korea
Treasury stock	0.67%	South Korea

== History slogans ==
- Honam Petrochemical Creating a prosperous future through petrochemical industry (1983)
- Honam Petrochemical creates new technologies through advanced research and development (1994 ~ 1996)
- Life value Creator (2012 ~ 2018)
- The Global Player (2018 ~ 2019)
- Chemizing Thoughts into the Future (2019 ~ 2021)
- Adding Momentum to the World with Chemistry (2021 ~ Present)

== See also ==
- List of largest chemical producers
