= Lotte Wellfood =

South Korean confectionery company

Lotte Wellfood Co., Ltd.
- Native name: 롯데웰푸드 주식회사
- Formerly: Lotte Confectionery (1967–2023)
- Type: Public
- Traded as: KRX: 280360
- Industry: Food
- Predecessors: Lotte Confectionery; Lotte Foods
- Founded: 1967; 59 years ago (original); October 12, 2017; 8 years ago (reincarnation)
- Founder: Shin Kyuk-ho
- Headquarters: Seoul, South Korea
- Area served: Worldwide
- Parent: Lotte Corporation
- Website: www.lottewellfood.com/en

Lotte Wellfood Co., Ltd. (Korean: 롯데웰푸드 주식회사), formerly Lotte Confectionery, is a South Korean international confectionery company headquartered in Seoul, South Korea. The company was established in 1967. Currently, it is the third-largest chewing gum manufacturer in the world, and its plants are located in Kazakhstan, Pakistan, Belgium, India, Russia, Myanmar, and China. Lotte Confectionery was renamed Lotte Wellfood in 2023, after being merged with Lotte Foods in 2022.

== History ==
=== Bubble gum beginnings in the 1940s ===
Although often a South Korean company, Lotte originated in post-World War II Japan. During the war, Shin Kyuk-ho, a native of Korea, went to Tokyo to study at a technical college in 1941 at the age of 19. After graduating, Shin remained in Japan, adopting the Japanese name of Takeo Shigemitsu. By 1946, Shin decided to go into business for himself, launching the Hikara Special Chemical Research Institute. This company produced soaps and cosmetics from surplus chemicals stocks left over from the war.

Though the company remained small, within a year he had amassed enough capital to launch a new company to produce chewing gum. Introduced by American soldiers following the war, chewing gum quickly became popular among Japanese consumers eager to embrace all things American. In 1948, Shin founded Lotte Co., with ten employees.

Shin's choice of the company's name came from his admiration for Goethe's Sorrows of Young Werther, particularly the character of Charlotte. Using natural chicle, Lotte launched a number of chewing gum brands, including Orange Gum, Lotte Gum, Cowboy Gum, Mable Gum, and the highly popular Baseball Gum. The company backed up its products with strong advertising support, becoming one of the first in Japan to sponsor television programs, as well as its own baseball team and other events, such as beauty pageants. In the mid-1950s, the company sponsored the country's Antarctic Research Expedition Team, developing a chewing gum for the effort's training program. The company then launched the gum, known as Cool Mint Gum, for the consumer market, in 1956.

The gum featured a penguin on the package, which became one of the country's most prominent consumer logos into the next century. Another Lotte sponsoring effort was the Lotte Music Album show on television, a popular music-oriented program that ran through the late 1970s. Shin expanded his production interest to include candies, cookies, and snack cakes, and by the early 1960s, the company had established itself as a rival to Japan's two largest confectionery groups, Meiji and Morinaga. The company's true breakthrough came during the 1960s, with its entry into the chocolate market. In 1964, the company launched its first milk chocolate, called Ghana, adapting Swiss-style chocolates for the Japanese palate. The company supported this launch with a massive television advertisement campaign, firmly positioning the brand in the minds of consumers. The launch paved the way for Lotte's emergence as the number one chocolate manufacturer in Japan by the end of the century. Although Lotte had successfully established itself in Japan — a country where ethnicity had always been a prominent part of the national identity— Shin had not abandoned his Korean roots. Lotte had established a presence in Korea as early as 1958, opening a factory producing chewing gum and other confectionery, as well as instant noodles, for the Korean market. The normalization of diplomatic relations between Japan and Korea in 1965, however, presented a new opportunity for the company. Lotte decided to move into Korea on a full scale, and in 1967, the company established a dedicated operation for South Korea, called Lotte Confectionery Co.

=== Adding Korean operations in the 1960s ===
It was not long, however, before Shin found himself in trouble with the Korean government, then still under the authoritarian regime. The South Korean government was then in the process of building up its military strength as part of its cold war with North Korea. Seeking to establish its own industrial defense capacity, the government approached Shin with a request for him to contribute to this effort, encouraging him to enter military production as well.

Yet Shin, perhaps mindful of the negative publicity that a move into arms production would bring to the company's confectionery sales, refused. The refusal brought a series of difficulties for Lotte Confectionery, which finally were resolved by the direct intervention of then president Park Chung Hee. Rather than agree to invest in the country's defence effort, Shin agreed to transfer the centre of Lotte's operations to South Korea. Lotte Confectionery now became the core of Shin's growing empire; nonetheless, the original Lotte Co. and the Japanese market remained the company's largest confectionery operation until the 1990s.

=== International success in the new century ===
In the 1990s and 2000s, Lotte turned to the international market for further growth. The company had made its first international extension, other than in Korea, in the late 1970s. In 1978, Lotte set up a subsidiary in the United States, opening production facilities in Battle Creek, Michigan. The group's U.S. presence later expanded to include a sales office in Chicago, supporting sales of the group's chewing gums and cookies.

In the 1990s, Lotte turned to markets closer to home. The company established a subsidiary in Thailand in 1989, where it began producing and distributing candy and confectionery. In 1993, Lotte entered Indonesia, launching a subsidiary in Jakarta. This was followed by the creation of a joint venture for the mainland Chinese market, which established production facilities in Beijing in 1994. The company acquired full control of its Chinese operations in 2005. The Philippines became part of the Lotte empire in 1995, with the launch of a sales and distribution subsidiary in Manila. One year later, the company added production and sales operations in Ho Chi Minh, Vietnam, as well.

Continuing product development brought the company new successes as well. In 1996, the company launched its Chocolate Zero, claiming to be the world's first sugarless chocolate. The following year, Lotte became the first in Japan to launch a xylitol-based chewing gum. Because xylitol, unlike other sweeteners, did not produce acid when chewed, the company was able to promote its chewing gum as a cavity-fighting product. The company's interest in developing xylitol-based products continued into the 2000s, including the launch of the Xylitol Family Bottle, a beverage containing xylitol as a sweetener. In 2005, the company launched its Lotte Notime tooth-polishing chewing gum.

Lotte expanded its frozen dessert operations in 2002, forming a joint venture with troubled Snow Brand Milk Products, then involved in a beef-labelling scandal. The joint venture, Lotte Snow Co., was owned at 80 percent by Lotte, and launched production of Snow-branded ice cream products. In 2005, the company expanded its operations in China, buying up control of Qingdao-based Jinhu Shipin. That move was seen as part of the group's strategy to become a major confectionery group on a global scale. Lotte remained controlled by Shin Kyuk-ho, joined by his children and other family members. In less than 60 years, Shin had built Lotte from a small chewing gum producer into one of the world's top confectionery groups.

On October 12, 2017, Lotte Confectionery announced that the company had been spun-off in order to form Lotte Corporation as the holding company.

== Corporate governance ==
As of June 2024.

Shareholder	Stake (%)	Flag
Lotte Corporation	47.47%	South Korea
Lotte Aluminium	6.82%	South Korea
Lotte Scholarship Foundation	5.26%	South Korea
Lotte Holdings	4.41%	Japan
Shin Dong-bin	1.93%	South Korea
Shin Young-ja	1.49%	South Korea
L No. 2 Investment Company	1.46%	Japan
Chang Jung-an	0.14%	South Korea
Shin Yu-mi	0.11%	Japan
Treasury Stock	6.29%	South Korea

== Products ==
Many of Lotte's products are sold internationally in areas with Japanese and/or Korean immigrants and in Asian supermarkets around the world.

=== Confectionery ===
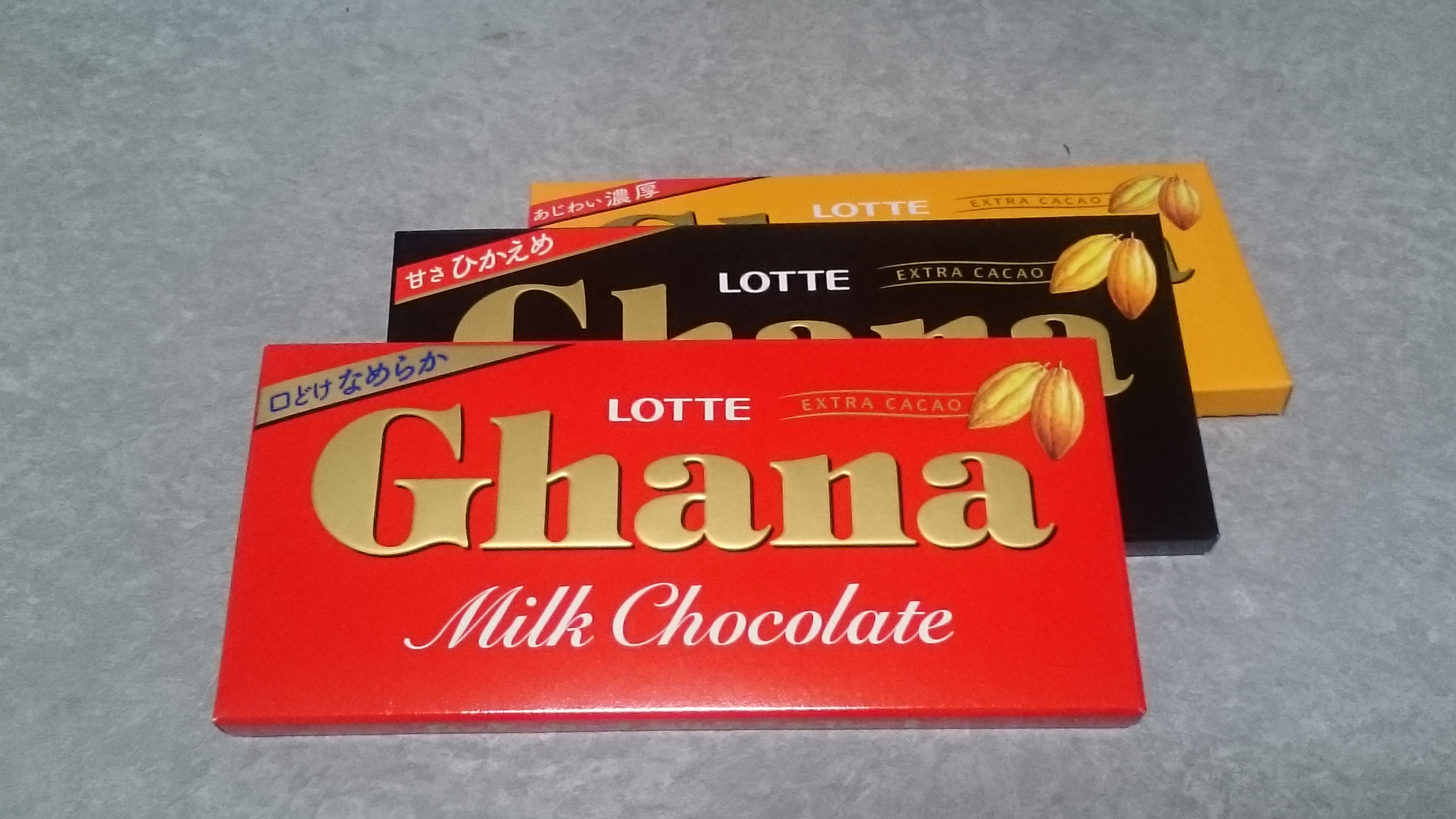
Lotte Ghana Chocolate

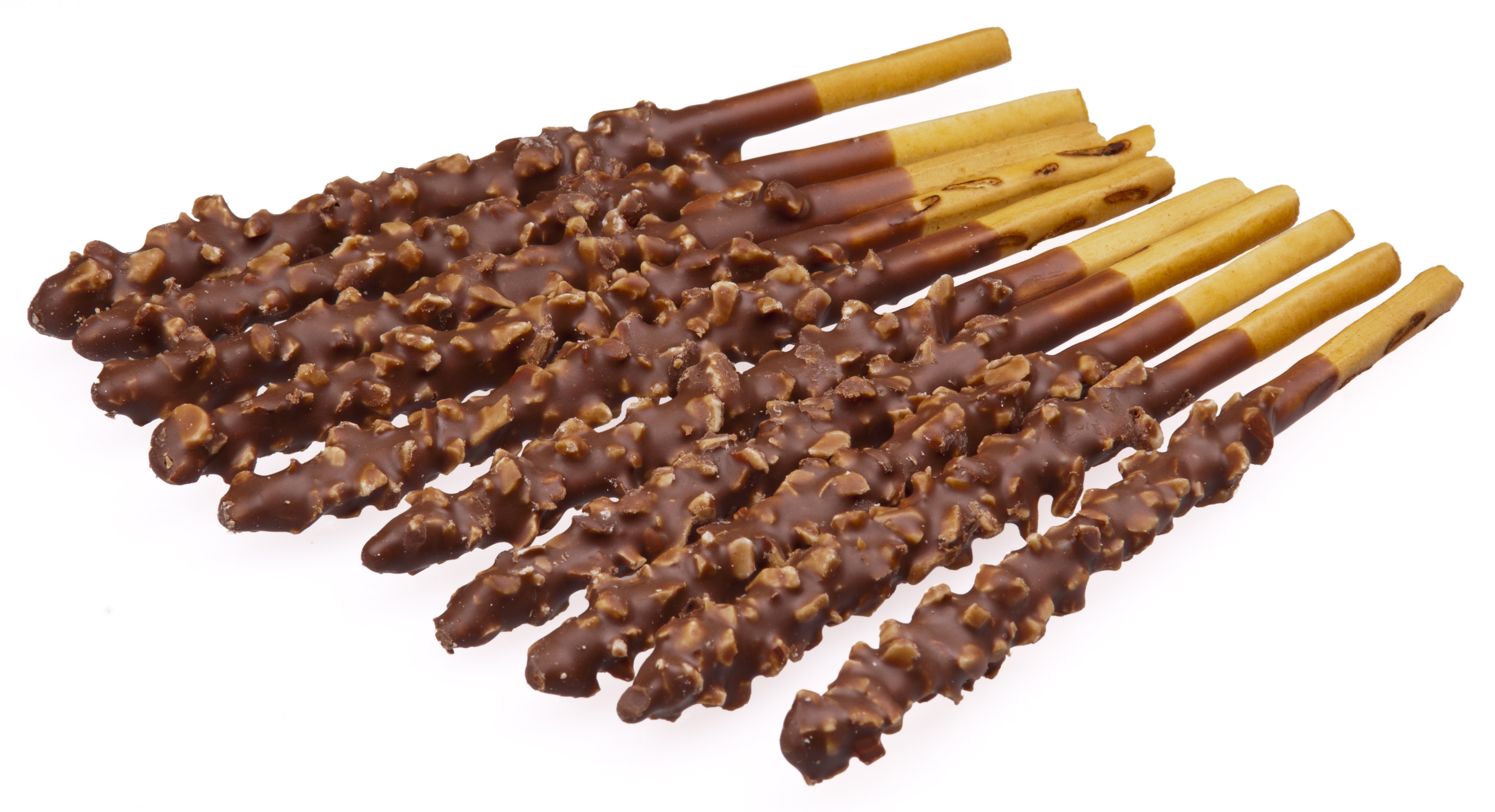
Lotte Pepero

The confectionery line-up covers a wide range of snacks including gums, candies, biscuits, and chocolates. The Juicy Fresh, Spearmint, and Freshmint chewing gums and Ghana chocolate bars have been part of the product line for more than four decades, while the Xylitol chewing gum attracts customers with its ability to reduce the risk of tooth decay.

Lotte Confectionery also produces the Crunky candy bar and the Chic-Choc cookie (a chocolate chip cookie), one of the most famous brands in South Korea. Crunkys bars are produced in a range of flavours. A popular variety in Japan is the purple sweet potato variety, which is released seasonally.
s Additionally, they produce other baked snacks, including the Margaret cookie. Lotte is also well known for their cookies called Koala's March, which are small cream-filled cookies shaped like koalas, packaged in a unique hexagonal box, and Pepero, a product inspired by Pocky.

To extend the reach of products of both companies in China, Lotte has established a joint venture with Hershey's. Also, in 2008, Lotte also took over Guylian, a Belgium company that makes chocolate.

=== Ice cream ===
Lotte Confectionery has a large share of South Korea’s ice cream market and sells ice cream in bar, cone, cup, pencil, and bucket formats.

=== Health supplements ===
Lotte Confectionery launched a health supplement brand Health 1 to produce various supplements with vitamins, minerals, granules, red ginseng extracts, and other animals- and plant-based extracts.

== Self-competition ==
Until 2022, Lotte Food, another subsidiary of Lotte Group, also sold ice cream, competing directly with Lotte Confectionery.

To put an end to this, the company considered merging the ice cream business of Lotte Food and Lotte Confectionery in February 2022. The merger was resolved on March 23, approved by shareholders on March 27, and completed on July 1, beginning the unification of Lotte Group's food interests.

== See also ==
- List of companies of South Korea
- Lotte
