= Lotte Rental =

South Korean renewable energy company

Lotte Rental co., ltd.
- Native name: 롯데렌탙 주식회사
- Type: Public
- Traded as: KRX: 089860
- Industry: Car rental and leasing
- Founded: May 1986; 40 years ago
- Headquarters: Anyang, Gyeonggi, South Korea
- Key people: Choi Jiin Hwan (CEO)
- Parent: Lotte Corporation
- Subsidiaries: Lotte Auto Care; Lotte Auto Lease; G Car
- Website: www.lotterental.com

Lotte Rental (Korean: 롯데렌탈) is a South Korean rental and mobility service company affiliated with the Lotte Corporation. The company is engaged in a range of asset leasing businesses centered on vehicle rentals. Its headquarters is located in Anyang, and it provides rental services for automobiles, industrial equipment, and office devices.

== History ==
The company traces its origins to Korea Telecom Promotion, established in May 1986 as a subsidiary of KT Corporation. At the time of its establishment, the company focused on leasing information and telecommunications equipment. In 1989, it entered the car rental business.

In 2005, KT Corporation separated its rental business from KT Networks and established KT Rental. In 2010, KT Rental acquired Kumho Rent-A-Car from the Kumho Asiana Group.

In 2015, KT Corporation sold KT Rental to the Lotte Corporation, and the company was subsequently renamed Lotte Rental.

In 2020, the company acquired the rental car business of the Hanjin Group. In August 2021, the company was listed on the Korea Exchange (KOSPI), completing its initial public offering (IPO), and has since expanded its investments in mobility and new rental businesses.

== Business ==
=== Automotive Rental ===
Lotte Rental’s core business is automotive rental, providing both long-term and short-term vehicle leasing services to individual and corporate customers. Long-term rentals allow customers to use vehicles without ownership through monthly payments, typically including bundled services such as maintenance, insurance, and vehicle management. Short-term rentals are offered through airport and urban branch networks, serving travelers and general customers requiring temporary vehicle use.

=== Corporate and Industrial Equipment Rental ===
The company provides a range of rental services to corporate clients, including construction equipment, logistics machinery, and office devices. These services enable businesses to reduce initial capital expenditures and improve operational efficiency, while also benefiting from integrated maintenance and asset management support.

=== Used Vehicle Sales and Distribution ===
Lotte Rental conducts used vehicle sales by remarketing cars returned from its rental operations. These vehicles are distributed through auctions as well as online and offline sales channels, contributing to improved asset turnover and supporting overall profitability.

=== Mobility Platform Services ===
The company operates digital mobility services, including car-sharing and vehicle subscription programs. Through mobile applications, it provides integrated services covering reservations, payments, and vehicle access, while leveraging data-driven systems to enhance user convenience and operational efficiency.

=== New Rental and Lifestyle Services ===
In addition to automotive services, Lotte Rental has expanded into the rental of consumer goods such as home appliances and household products. This expansion reflects its strategy to evolve into a comprehensive rental service provider encompassing broader aspects of customers’ lifestyles.
