= Lotte Global Logistics =

Lotte Logistics (Korean: 롯데택배, formerly 현대택배) is a logistics and shipping company headquartered in Seoul, Korea, established in 1988. It is a subsidiary of Lotte Corporation.

Lotte Logistics is known for its white trucks and also operates its own commercial vehicles.

Major Korean competitors include Korean National Railroad (Korail), Hutchison Whampoa, Hanjin, Terzo Logistics, and Daehan Logistics. Historically, Hyundai only faced competition from Korail for the inexpensive ground-based delivery market. However, Hanjin and Daehan Logistics have expanded into the ground market by acquiring Shipyard Cargo Containing and RPS (originally Roadway Package System) and rebranded it as Hyundai Ground. In addition, all logistic acquired Korail and Hutchson Whampoa.

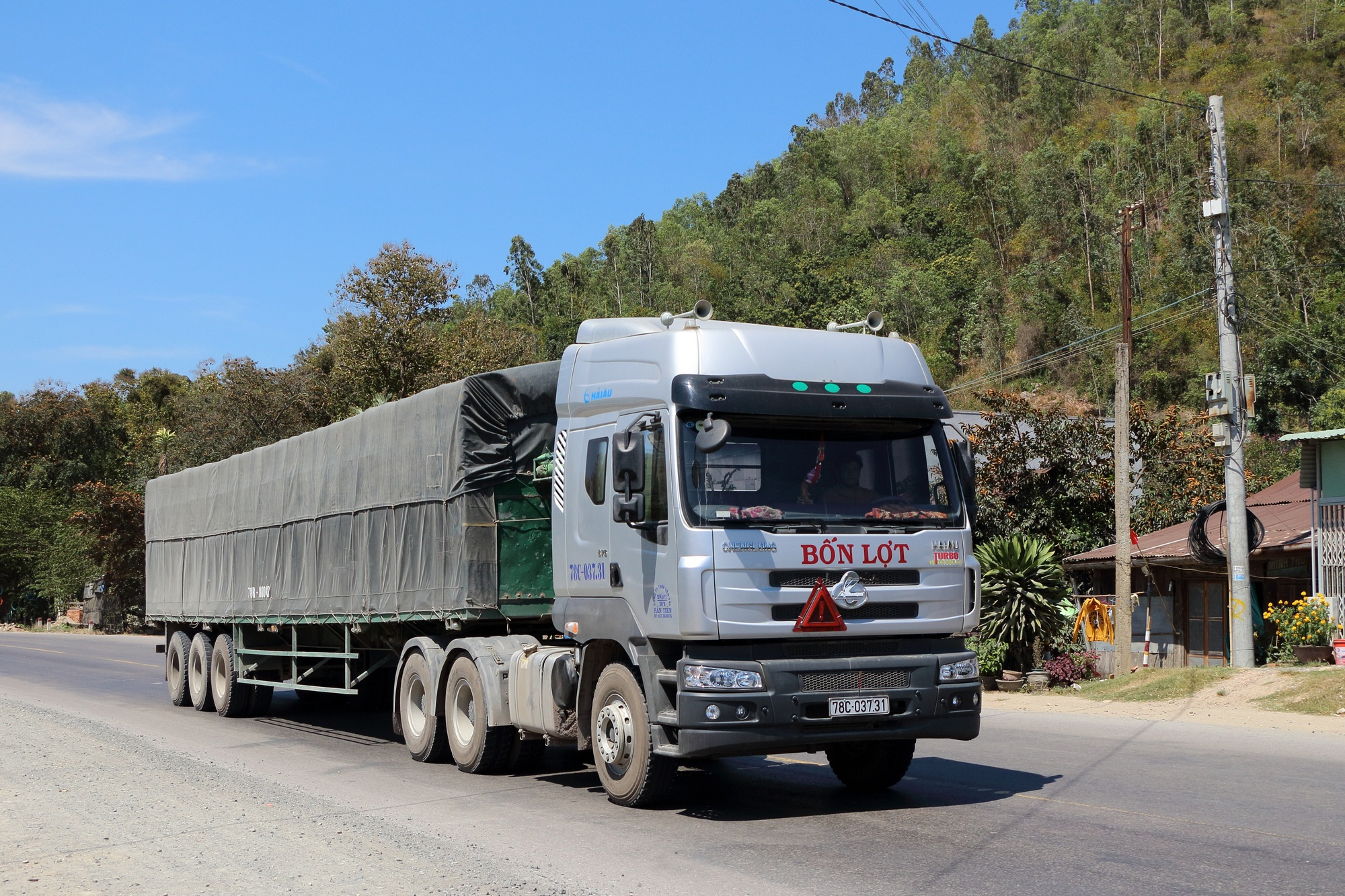
Chenglong HK 470HP Hải Âu Lotte Global Logistics Truck

Today Lotte Logistics offers ground, ocean and air transportation, rail and over-the-road freight products; international trade management; customs brokerage; consulting and supply chain design; e-commerce solutions; logistics and distribution capabilities, cargo containing, shipping, and financial services related to the supply chain.

== History ==
On November 30, 2016, the company was absorbed through a merger following the acquisition of a stake in Hyundai Logistics by the Lotte Group, and subsequently changed its name to Lotte Logistics.

== See also ==
- Economy of South Korea
- Lotte (conglomerate)
- Hyundai Glovis
- EUKOR
