= Lotte Corporation =

South Korean multinational conglomerate corporation

- Logo used since 2017
- Native name: 롯데그룹
- Type: Public
- Traded as: KRX: 004990
- Industry: Conglomerate
- Founded: 24 March 1967; 59 years ago
- Founder: Shin Kyuk-ho
- Headquarters: Songpa District, Seoul, South Korea
- Areas served: Worldwide
- Key people: Shin Kyuk-ho; Shin Dong-bin
- Subsidiaries: Lotte Capital; Lotte Chemical; Lotte Chilsung; Lotte Global Logistics; Lotte Shopping; Lotte Wellfood; Lotte Engineering & Construction

Korean name
- Hangul: 롯데그룹
- RR: Rotde geurup
- MR: Rotte kŭrup
- Website: www.lotte.co.kr

Lotte Corporation (Korean: 롯데지주) is a South Korean multinational conglomerate corporation, and the fifth-largest chaebol in South Korea. Lotte was founded on 28 June 1948 by Korean businessman Shin Kyuk-ho in Tokyo. Shin expanded Lotte to his ancestral country, South Korea, with the establishment of Lotte Confectionery in Seoul on 3 April 1967.

Lotte Corporation consists of over 90 business units employing 60,000 people engaged in such diverse industries as candy manufacturing, beverages, hotels, fast food, retail, financial services, industrial chemicals, electronics, IT, construction, publishing, and entertainment. Lotte runs additional businesses in China, Thailand, Malaysia, Indonesia, Vietnam, Cambodia, Uzbekistan, India, the United States, the United Kingdom, Kazakhstan, Russia, the Philippines, Myanmar, Pakistan, Poland (Lotte bought Poland's largest candy company Wedel from Kraft Foods in June 2010), Australia and New Zealand (Lotte successfully bought 4 duty-free stores in Australia and 1 in New Zealand from JR/Group in 2019).

== History ==
Lotte was founded in June 1948, by Korean businessman Shin Kyuk-ho in Tokyo, Japan, two years after he graduated from Waseda Jitsugyo High School (早稲田実業学校). Originally called Lotte Co., Ltd, the company has grown from selling chewing gum to children in post-war Japan to becoming a major multinational corporation.

=== Name ===
The source of the company's name is German. Shin Kyuk-ho was impressed with Johann Wolfgang von Goethe's The Sorrows of Young Werther (1774) and named his newly founded company Lotte after the character Charlotte in the novel. ("Charlotte" is also the name of premium auditoriums in movie theatres run by Lotte.)

== Operations ==
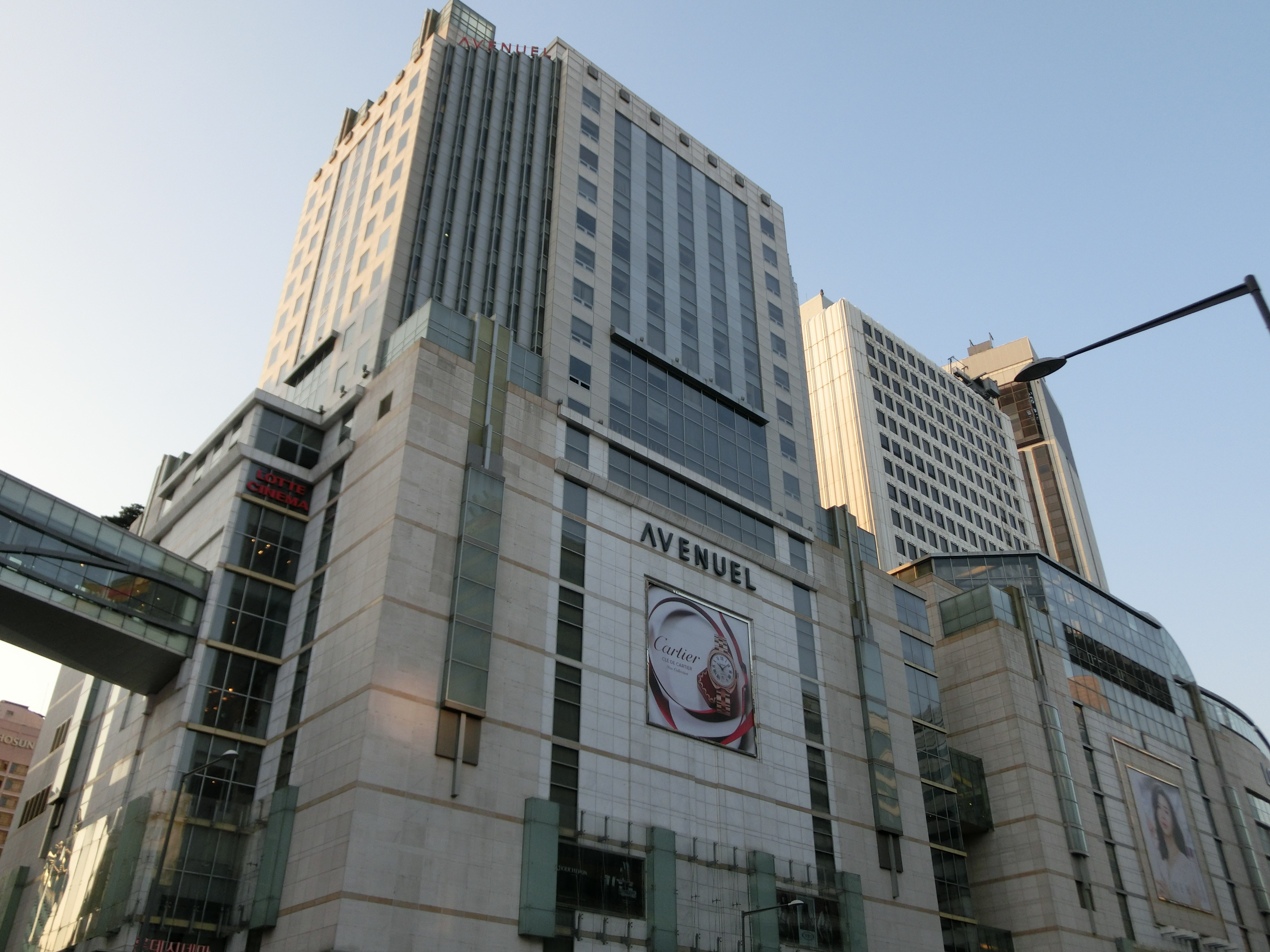
Lotte Department Store in Seoul

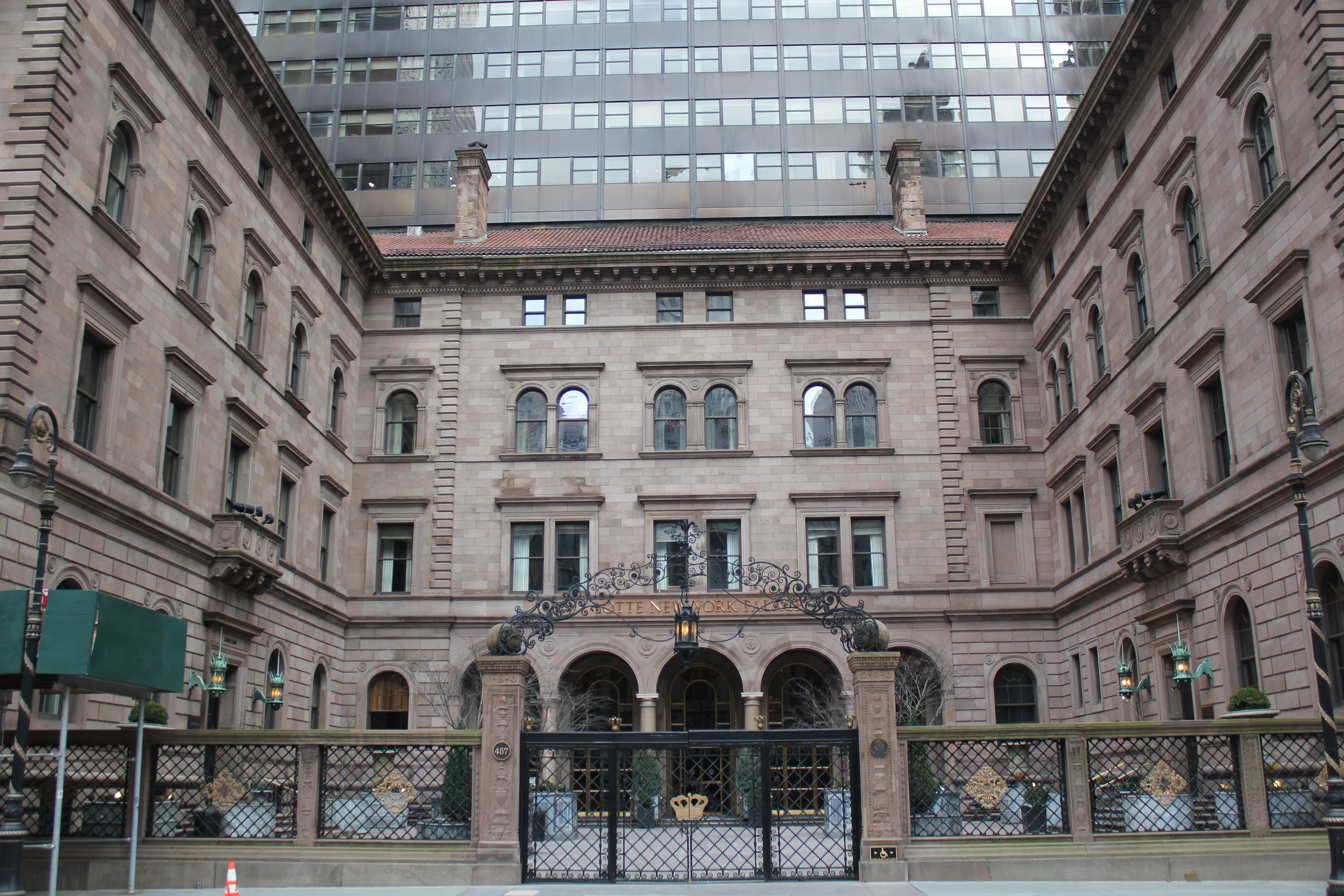
Lotte New York Palace Hotel

Lotte Corporation – is located in Songpa-gu, Seoul and Lotte Holdings Co., Ltd. in Shinjuku, Tokyo. In 2013, as Shin Kyuk-ho, the founder of Lotte, faced declining health due to Alzheimer’s disease, a dispute arose between his two sons over the control of the conglomerate. Although Shin Kyuk-ho had designated his eldest son, Shin Dong-joo, as his successor, leadership was not transferred immediately. The conflict over ownership culminated with Shin Dong-bin emerging as the leader of Lotte.

On December 9, 2024, Appetite Equity Partners took over when it decided to buy a 56.2% stake in Lotte Rentals owned by Lotte Group.

=== Business ===
Lotte Group's major businesses are food, retail, chemical, construction, manufacturing, tourism, service, finance, etc.

- Food: Lotte Confectionery, Lotte Chilsung, Lotte Liquor, Lotte Asahi Liquor, Lotte GRS, and others.
- Retail/Entertainment: Lotte Department Store, Lotte Shopping, Lotte Hi-Mart, Lotte Cultureworks, Lotte Cinema, Lotte Super, Lotte On, Lotte Korea Seven, FRL Korea, and others.
- Chemical/construction/manufacturing: Lotte Construction, Lotte Chemical, Lotte Fine Chemical, Lotte MCC, Lotte E&C, Lotte Aluminium, Lotte Ineos Chemical, Korea Fujifilm, and others.
- Tourism/Service/Finance: Lotte Global Logistics, Lotte Rental, Lotte Resort, Lotte Duty Free, Lotte World, Lotte Property & Development, Lotte Capital, Lotte Hotels & Resorts, Daehong Communications, Lotte Hotel Busan, Lotte International, Lotte Innovate (Lotte Data Communication), and others

=== Sports ===
Lotte also owns professional baseball teams:

- Lotte Giants in Busan, South Korea (1982–present)
- Chiba Lotte Marines in Chiba (city), Japan (1969–present)

=== Lotte R&D Center ===
- Korea R&D Center : 201, Magokjungang-ro, Gangseo-gu, Seoul, South Korea

== Controversies ==
=== Treatment of beluga whales ===
Lotte Corporation has received negative press attention due to treatment of a captive beluga whale named Bella, currently held in the Lotte World Aquarium Attraction in Seoul. In 2016, Lotte Corporation announced that they would no longer acquire new beluga whales after two of Bella's companions, Belli and Bellu, died in their care. In 2019, Lotte Corporation pledged that they would release Bella from captivity. As of 2023, the Lotte Corporation has come under increasing criticism for keeping Bella in solitary captivity for an extended multi-year period following their announcement. The corporation has also been criticized by civic groups for a lack of updates or cohesive plan for retiring Bella to a sanctuary.

=== 2016 embezzlement scandal ===
In June 2016, the police conducted a probe into Lotte Corp for a possible slush fund and embezzlement. The Seoul Central District Prosecutor's Office reported that 240 investigators raided 17 Lotte offices, including its central Seoul headquarters and the homes of founder Shin Kyuk-ho, Chairman Shin Dong-bin and other key executives, with 15 more offices being raided just a week later.

After news of the investigation broke, between June 10 and June 14, Lotte Group firms lost over ₩1.21 trillion (US$902.8 million) in market value. By October, its value had fallen by 15.8% to ₩7.75 trillion (US$5.78 billion) compared to its June 9 figure of ₩9.26 trillion (US$6.91 billion). Lotte Chemical Corp also withdrew from bidding for Axiall Corp in the wake of the scandal.

On 13 June 2016 Lotte announced it would withdraw its initial public offering (IPO) for Hotel Lotte, which was scheduled for the following month. The IPO was predicted to garner up to ₩5.2 trillion (US$3.88 billion) which would have been the largest offering in South Korean history. Lotte spokesperson Choi Min-ho told the Korean Herald, “we physically cannot meet next month’s deadline to complete the Hotel Lotte IPO given the current circumstances". Despite local press reporting that Chairman Shin Dong-bin was keen to restart Hotel Lotte's IPO in 2020, Hotel Lotte is still yet to go public.

In August 2016, Vice Chairman Lee In-won was found dead in his car with a four-page long suicide note. His death came just hours before he was due to be questioned by prosecutors. Lee was considered the top lieutenant of Chairman Shin Dong-bin. According to a statement released by Lotte Group after his death, Lee "oversaw Lotte Group's overall housekeeping and core businesses and accurately understood the minds of Chairman-in-Chief Shin Kyuk-ho and Chairman Shin Dong-bin."

In October 2016, the Seoul Central District Prosecutors' Office closed their investigation. The probe had accused Lotte founder Shin Kyuk-ho, his mistress/common-law wife Seo Mi-kyung, his son Chairman Shin Dong-bin, and two other children of embezzling ₩146.2 billion (US$109.08 million). In addition, prosecutors claim family members committed inheritance tax fraud amounting to ₩115.6 billion (US$86.25 million). A further ₩22 billion (US$16.41 million) of corporate tax was allegedly avoided by Lotte Chemical. South Korean authorities also argued that Lotte Engineering & Construction overpaid its suppliers and then reclaimed the difference, amounting to slush funds worth ₩30.2 billion (US$22.53 million). In total, the allegations of misconduct amounted to ₩375.5 billion (US$280.17 million).

The following year, founder Shin Kyuk-ho was fined ₩3.5 billion (US$2.61 million) and sentenced to four years in prison. At 95 years old, it seemed possible he would spend his last days incarcerated, but he was able to avoid imprisonment due to health issues, eventually dying in 2020.

The founder's son and Chairman Shin Dong-bin was convicted of the charges of embezzlement and breach of trust, while Dong-bin's older brother Dong-joo was acquitted.

=== 2017 bribery scandal ===
On 17 April 2017, Chairman Shin Dong-bin was embroiled in the 2016 South Korean political scandal and charged with bribery. In order to secure a duty-free deal for Lotte, Shin was accused of donating ₩7 billion (US$5.22 million) to a non-profit controlled by incumbent President Park Geun-hye's close friend Choi Soon-sil. On 13 February 2018 Shin was fined ₩7 billion (US$5.22 million) and sentenced to 2.5 years' incarceration. He was jailed immediately following the sentencing.

Following his conviction, Shin stepped down as Chief Operating Officer of Lotte Group's Japanese-based holding firm but remained on the board of directors.

In October 2018, an appeals court freed Shin from prison after just 234 days, giving him a suspended sentence of 4 years and cancelling the fine. News of Shin's release increased Lotte Group's market value by 4.2%.

A year later, in October 2019, the Seoul High Court upheld the appeals court's decision, arguing that Shin "passively" committed bribery with the understanding that not donating to Choi's non-profit would result in damage to Lotte Group.

=== Losses in China ===
Since 2004, Lotte had invested over ₩8 trillion (US$5.97 billion) into growing their presence in China, operating 112 Lotte Mart stores, 12 cinemas, and 5 Lotte Department stores by 2017. However, Lotte's Chinese operations had reported net losses of ₩75.3 billion (US$56.18 million) by 2011, soaring sevenfold in just 3 years to ₩554.9 billion (US$414.02 million) in 2014.

To counter potential threats from North Korea, South Korea & the US sought to deploy an advanced anti-missile defence system, THAAD, in 2016. The site chosen was Lotte Skyhill Country Club in Seongsan due to its high elevation, distance from civilian centres and existing infrastructure. A Lotte spokesperson said that leadership "agonized" over the decision to allow the sale of the golf course for the THAAD system, but concluded their hands were tied: "if we say no to the government, we can't do business in Korea".

The installation of the THAAD system led to a rise in anti-Korean sentiment in China, with much of the ire directed at Lotte. Government-controlled news media encouraged Chinese consumers to boycott the Korean conglomerate, and protests were held across multiple cities, with employees of a mall in Xuchang protesting Lotte as they sang the Chinese national anthem.

Shortly after news of Lotte's co-operation with the THAAD installation, nearly all of Lotte Mart's 112 Chinese stores were closed down by the government due to supposed fire safety issues. Lotte Department Stores also suffered in the hostile business environment, with an operating loss of ₩140 billion (US$104.46 million) between 2016 and 2018. Both Lotte Department Stores and Lotte Mart formally ceased trading in China in 2018, with Lotte Chilsung Beverage and Lotte Confectionary leaving China a year later.

In 2022, Lotte closed their Chinese headquarters, effectively ending their business operations in the mainland.

== See also ==
- Lotte World Tower
