= Lotte Hi-Mart =

South Korean electronic goods retailer

Lotte Hi-Mart Co. Ltd.
- Type: Public
- Traded as: KRX: 071840
- Industry: Retail
- Founded: 1993
- Headquarters: Seoul, South Korea
- Key people: Seon Jong Koo, Founder; Lee Dong-woo, CEO
- Products: Shopping mall, Electronic commerce, Retail
- Revenue: ▲$50.5 million USD (2005)
- Number of employees: 3,872 (2018)
- Parent: Lotte Shopping
- Website: http://www.e-himart.co.kr

Lotte Hi-Mart (Korean: 하이마트) is a South Korean retailer of electronic goods. It was originally a unit of bankrupt Daewoo Electronics that founder Seon Jong-koo spun off in 1999. Hi-Mart is headquartered in Seoul. Hi-mart was taken over by Lotte Corporation on July 6, 2012.

== History ==
Seon Jong-koo was formerly employed by Daewoo Electronics. When the company went bankrupt in 1999, he joined a spin-off company that became Hi-Mart.

In June 2008, South Korean chaebol Eugene Group acquired 32.4% of Hi-Mart. in June 2010, the company went public.

In July 2012, Lotte Corporation acquired a 65.3% of Hi-Mart for $1.1 billion. Hi-Mart operated 290 stores in Korea, controlling 35% of the market. The acquisition was maneuvered in the midst of a scandal about its founder and CEO, Seon Jong-koo, accused of embezzlement totaling $228 million. In April 2012, one witness jumped out his apartment's window after being questioned by Korea's justice about bribing Seon Jong-koo. In December 2014, Seon Jong-koo was replaced by Lee Dong-woo. He was the second largest shareholder of the company and heavily supported by Hi-Mart's employees.

In October 2012, the deal was approved by the Korea Fair Trade Commission and the company announced it is changing the stores' names to Lotte Hi-Mart.

== See also ==
- Electronic commerce
- Online auction business model
- Shopping mall
