= Lotte Capital =

Lotte Capital 롯데캐피탈
- Company type: Subsidiary
- Founded: November 28, 1995; 30 years ago
- Headquarters: Seoul, Republic of Korea
- Products: Financial services
- Revenue: 52.05 billion ₩ (2011)
- Operating income: 11.56 billion ₩ (2011)
- Net income: 8.52 billion ₩ (2011)
- Number of employees: 565 (as of 2011)
- Parent: Lotte Corporation
- Website: www.lottecap.com

Lotte Capital Co, Ltd. is a Korean financial company, established in 1995 with headquarters in Seoul. It is the financial services unit of Lotte Corporation. Lotte Capital Co., Ltd., headquartered in Seoul, South Korea, is a financial institution operating as a subsidiary of Lotte Group. Focused on credit financial services, the company provides a diverse array of offerings. These encompass private financing, leasing, installment financing, corporate financing, family loans, corporate loans, discount bills, factoring, and various other financial solutions.

== Affiliate ==
=== Lotte Group ===
In September 2020, Lotte Group has spent 290 billion won to purchase Doosan Solus Co.
