= Lotte Holdings =

Japanese confectionary, hotels and sports holding company

Lotte Holdings Co., Ltd.

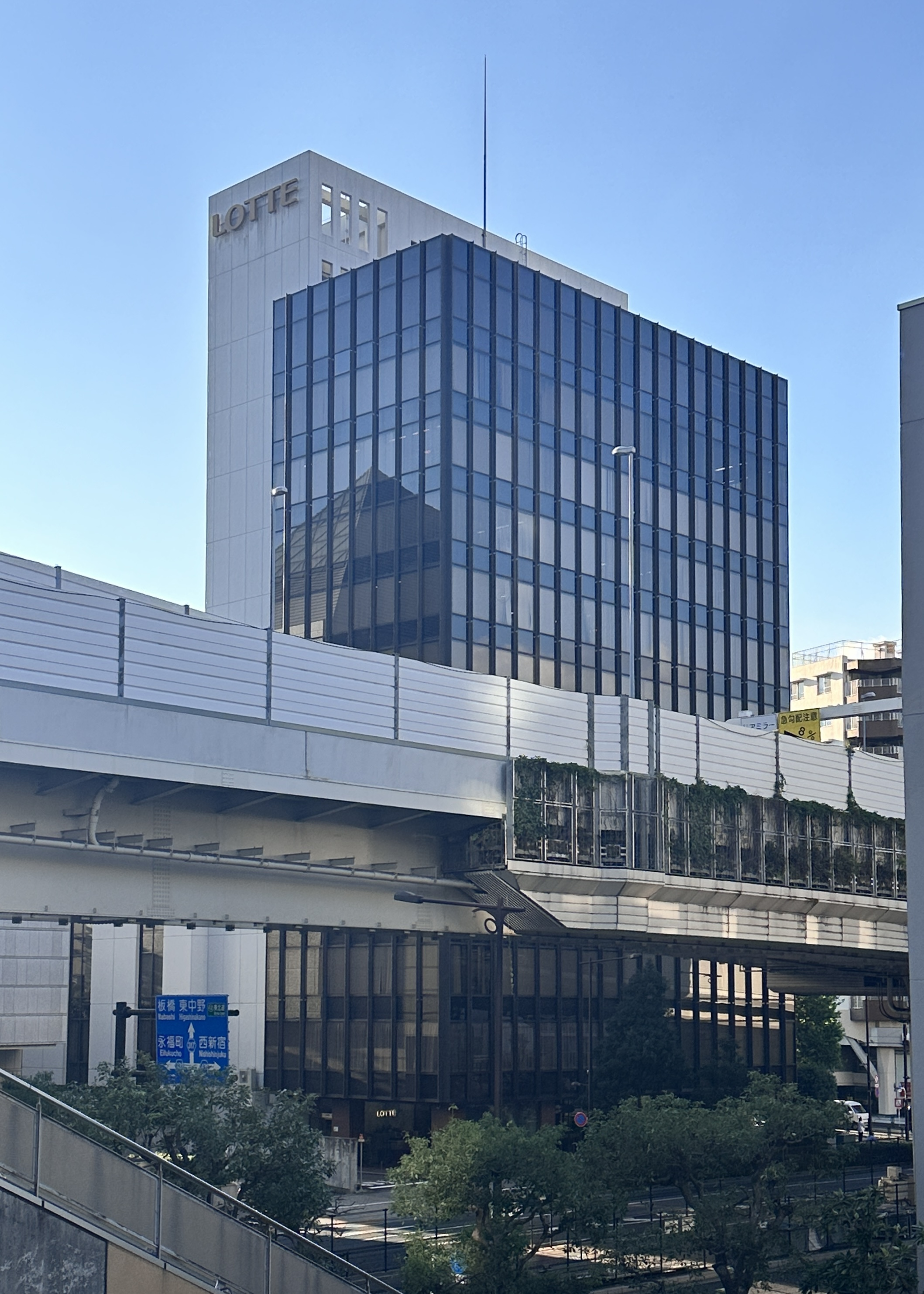
- Lotte Head Office
- Native name: 株式会社ロッテホールディングス
- Company type: Joint-stock company
- Industry: Food processing; Petrochemical; Electronics
- Founded: June 28, 1948; 77 years ago in Tokyo, Japan
- Founder: Shin Kyuk-ho
- Headquarters: Nishi-Shinjuku, Shinjuku, Tokyo, Japan
- Areas served: Worldwide
- Key people: Hideki Nakashima (President/Representative Director)
- Products: Confectionery
- Services: Financial services; retail
- Revenue: ¥338,237,000,000 (2012)
- Operating income: ¥21,847,000,000 (2012)
- Net income: ¥564,932,000,000 (2012)
- Number of employees: 3700 people (April 2018)
- Subsidiaries: Mary's Chocolate; Chiba Lotte Marines
- Website: www.lotte.co.jp

Lotte Holdings Co., Ltd. (株式会社ロッテホールディングス, kabushiki gaisha Rottehōrudingusu) is a Japanese multinational holding company which focused on confectionery and ice cream processing, hotels, and sport management. The company was founded in June 1948 by Zainichi Korean businessman Shin Kyuk-ho, also known as Takeo Shigemitsu.

It is the third largest confectionery manufacturer in Japan behind Meiji Seika and Ezaki Glico in terms of sales revenue.

== See also ==
- Chocolate in Japan
