= Tanjung Langsat =

Malaysian industrial area and port

Coordinates: 1.4721247°N 104.0101963°E

Tanjung Langsat is a main industrial area and port in Pasir Gudang, Johor Bahru District, Johor, Malaysia.

An onshore oil terminal was constructed at the area, with a total oil-storage capacity of 530 000m³ installed by March 2010.
