= Shin Kyuk-ho =

South Korean businessman (1921–2020)

Shin Kyuk-ho / Takeo Shigemitsu
- 신격호 / 重光武雄
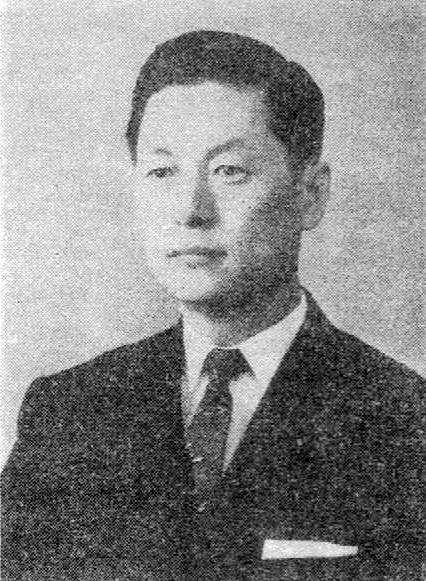
- Shin in 1964
- Born: 3 November 1921; Ulsan, Japanese Korea
- Died: 19 January 2020 (aged 98); Seoul, South Korea
- Education: Waseda University (Jitsugyo High and kōgakkō)
- Occupation: Businessman
- Known for: Founder of Lotte Corporation
- Children: 4, including Shin Dong-bin
- Relatives: Shin Choon-ho (brother); Shin Dong-won (nephew)

Native names

Japanese name
- Kanji: 重光 武雄
- Kana: しげみつ たけお
Transcriptions
- Revised Hepburn: Shigemitsu Takeo

Korean name
- Hangul: 신격호
- Hanja: 辛格浩
Transcriptions
- Revised Romanization: Sin Gyeokho
- McCune–Reischauer: Sin Kyŏkho

Shin Kyuk-ho (Korean: 신격호; 3 November 1921 – 19 January 2020), known in Japan as Takeo Shigemitsu (重光 武雄, Shigemitsu Takeo), was a Zainichi Korean businessman known for being the founder of the South Korean-Japanese conglomerate Lotte Corporation (Group), now one of the largest chaebols in South Korea.

During the bubble economy of Japan from the 1980s to the 1990s, he became the fourth wealthiest person in the world according to American business magazine Forbes in 1988, setting the record for the greatest wealth ever achieved by a Korean. Driven by a lifelong desire to contribute to his homeland, South Korea (Republic of Korea), his dream of the Lotte World Tower, the sixth tallest building in the world and the highest in the Korean peninsula, was realized in 2016, and he died in 2020.

== Career ==
Shin was born in Ulsan, Korea, Empire of Japan in 1921. He was the first of five sons and five daughters. Among his siblings was Shin Choon-ho, founder of South Korean food conglomerate Nongshim. In 1941, he stowed away on a ship to Japan, where he studied chemical engineering at Waseda University (kōgakkō) after he graduated from Waseda Jitsugyo High School. He adopted the Japanese name Takeo Shigemitsu and opened a rice cooker manufacturing plant in 1942. After the plant was destroyed during an air raid, Shin was rendered an unemployed college graduate until he founded Lotte in 1948. Lotte was expanded to South Korea in 1967. It grew from selling chewing gum to becoming a major multinational corporation.

In 2006, Shin and his family were ranked 136th on Forbes magazine's list "The World's Billionaires." In 2009, Shin was ranked 38th on the magazine's list of South Korea's richest people. Lotte itself was South Korea's fifth largest conglomerate as of 2017.

In June 2017, Shin retired from his role as board director of Lotte Holdings Co. after holding the position for nearly 70 years. In December 2017, he was sentenced to four years in prison after he was convicted of embezzling 128.6 billion won (119 million USD) from Lotte. However, Shin was allowed to remain free given his poor health.

== Personal life ==
Shin had a total of four children from three marriages. His first wife, Noh Soon-hwa, died in 1949. They had one daughter, Shin Young-ja (born 1944).

Shin then married a Japanese woman, Hatsuko Shigemitsu, in 1952 under the common-law marriage system. They had two sons, Shin Dong-joo (born 1954) and Shin Dong-bin (born 1956).

Shin was also married to Seo Mi-Kyung in South Korea under the country's common-law marriage system. They had one daughter, Shin Yu-mi (born 1982). Because of this bigamic common-law marriage status, some regard Seo Mi-Kyung as a concubine of Shin Kyuk-ho. Shin Dong-bin, second son of Shin Kyuk-ho and Hatsuko Shigemitsu, referred to Seo Mi-Kyung as "my father's girlfriend".
