= Lotte Center Hanoi =

Skyscraper in Vietnam

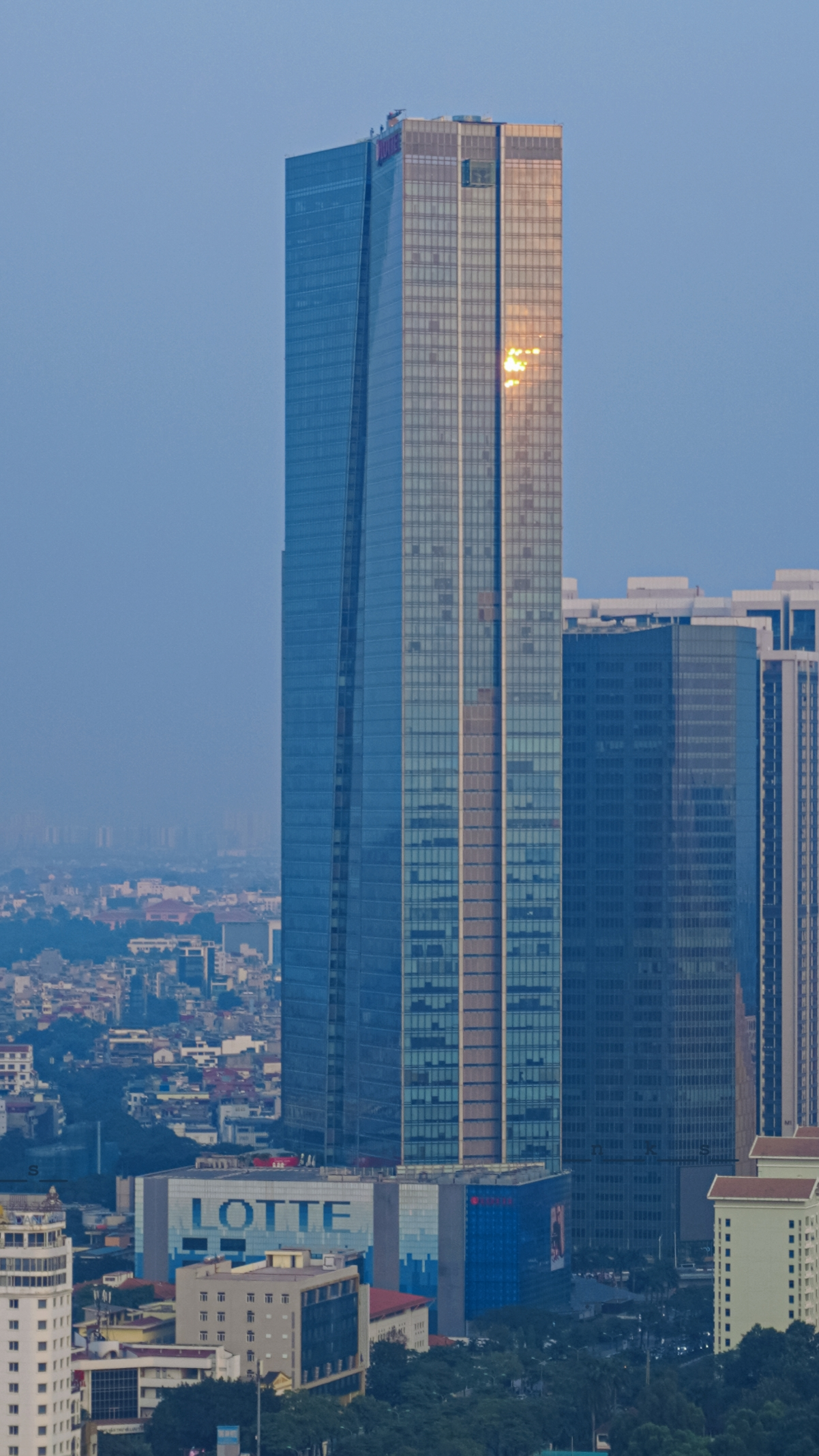
- Lotte Center Hanoi in 2022
- Alternative names: Hanoi City Complex
- Hotel chain: Lotte Hotel

General information
- Status: Completed
- Type: Office, Shopping, Convention Center
- Location: Ngọc Khánh, Ba Đình district, 54 Liễu Giai Street, Giảng Võ, Hanoi, Vietnam
- Coordinates: 21.03235°N 105.81260°E
- Construction started: 2010
- Completed: 2014

Height
- Roof: 272 m (892 ft)
- Top floor: 267 m (876 ft)

Technical details
- Floor count: 65
- Floor area: 253,402.44sq. m
- Lifts/elevators: 48

Design and construction
- Architects: Callison Architecture (SD); Junglim Architecture Vietnam (DD & CD)
- Engineer: Thornton Tomasetti

Website
- Lotte Center Hanoi

Lotte Center Hanoi is a skyscraper in Ba Đình district, Hanoi, Vietnam. Completed on 2 September 2014, the tower has 65 floors.

It was designed by the American company Callison. It is the third tallest building in Vietnam after Landmark 81 and the Keangnam Hanoi Landmark Tower in Yên Hòa. Lotte Center Hanoi includes offices, a five-star hotel, a sixth-floor Lotte Department Store, serviced residences, the Evian Spa, the Lotte Mart, restaurants and an observation deck.

== Facilities ==
=== Elevators ===
The center contains 30 elevators that travel at 360m/min or 6 m/s.

=== Retail ===
Lotte Center Hanoi contains the Lotte Department Store Vietnam, with a Lotte Mart Ba Đình Supermarket in the first basement. The department store occupies the following levels:

| Level | Use | Notable tenants |
|---|---|---|
| 6 | Restaurants | Yutang Taiwanese Milk tea & Street food, Manwah Taiwanese Hotpot Buffet, Meiwei Chinese Restaurant, Gojumong Casual Korean Restaurant, Tantan Korean Noodle Kitchen, Shogun Japanese Street BBQ, iSushi Japanese Buffet |
| 5 | Home Appliance, Children & Baby Goods, Playground, Customer services | Albeta, Bose, Boss, Canifa Kids, Minhaus, Mykingdom, Phương Nam Bookstore, Playtime, Wundertute Gourmet, Zwilling, Tefal, Fissler |
| 4 | Men's Fashion & Accessories, Sportswear & In-door Golf | Adidas, Nike, Samsonite, Casio, Galle Watch, HS Golf, Golfzon, MBS Pilates |
| 3 | Young casual clothes, Restaurant, Photobooth, AvenueL Lounge | Anta Sports, ANM, Canifa, Converse, Crocs, Giordano, Hobiverse, Levi's, Melissa, New Balance, Onoff, Skechers, Wilson, Thai Express, Dookki Korean Tteokbokki Buffet, Wulao Taiwanese Hotpot, De Faifo Vietnamese Restaurant, Lách Ca Lách Cách Vietnamese Restaurant, Photo Objet |
| 2 | Women's Fashion, Young Cosmetics, Jewelries, accessories, Lingeries, Restaurant, Galerie du Futur Exhibition Zone | Pizza 4P's, Anne Bra, Aldo, Banana Republic, Chic, Cole Haan, ECCO,Elixir, Geox, Pinktree, Pierre Cardin, Triumph, Wacoal, Sky Optical, Thế Giới Kim Cương, Hoàng Gia Pearl, Face Wash Fox, Yves Rocher |
| 1 | Global Fashion, Cosmetics, Restaurant & Café | Delica-Hans, Pizza 4P's, Starbucks, Maison Marou, An Hải Perfume, Burberry, Dior, Chanel, Coach, Gucci, Hugo, Estée Lauder, D&G, Lacoste, Jimmy Choo, Mont Blanc Shiseido, Shu Uemura, Sulwhasoo, Skii, The Whoo / O Hui, YSL Beauty, Swarovski, Pandora, Polo Ralph Lauren, Hermès, Lancôme, NARS, Tommy Hilfiger, Innisfree |

=== Hotel ===
The building contains a Lotte Hotel, Lotte Hotel Hanoi, which occupies floors 33 to 64:

- Floor 33: Main reception area (Lobby)
- Floors 34–35: Evian SPA
- Floor 36: Asian cuisine area with the Cantonese restaurant Red River and the Michelin-starred Dim Sum restaurant Tim Ho Wan
- Floors 38–61: 318 standard and deluxe guest rooms
- Floors 63–64: The luxurious Grill63 barbecue restaurant and the Pharaoh's Bar & Upper.

The hotel has three room categories:

- Standard rooms (Deluxe / Deluxe Family) from floors 40 to 53, room area range 42–44 m²
- Club rooms (Club Deluxe / Club Junior Suite) Floors 54–58, room area range 42–64 m². Includes private check-in, complimentary drinks and snacks all day at the Club Lounge (Floor 59)
- Luxury rooms (Premium Suites) Floors 59–61, room area range 99–329 m². Including Deluxe Suite, Premier Suite, Presidential Suite, and the Royal Suite on floor 61

=== Office leasing ===
The office leasing area is named workflex. It is the headquarters of Lotte Properties & Development Vietnam and Lotte Ventures Vietnam.

=== Observation deck ===
There is an observation deck on the 65th floor named Hanoi Sky. It has a small shop which sells drinks and snacks.

=== Rooftop ===
At the 65th floor, a separate lift takes visitors up two more floors. The 67th floor is thus denoted "PH" because it is the top floor. After exiting the elevator, there is a short set of stairs that takes visitors up to the highest floor of the building, this level is the top of the building and thus has no roof. At the rooftop there is a bar and a mini restaurant named Top of Hanoi.

== Gallery ==
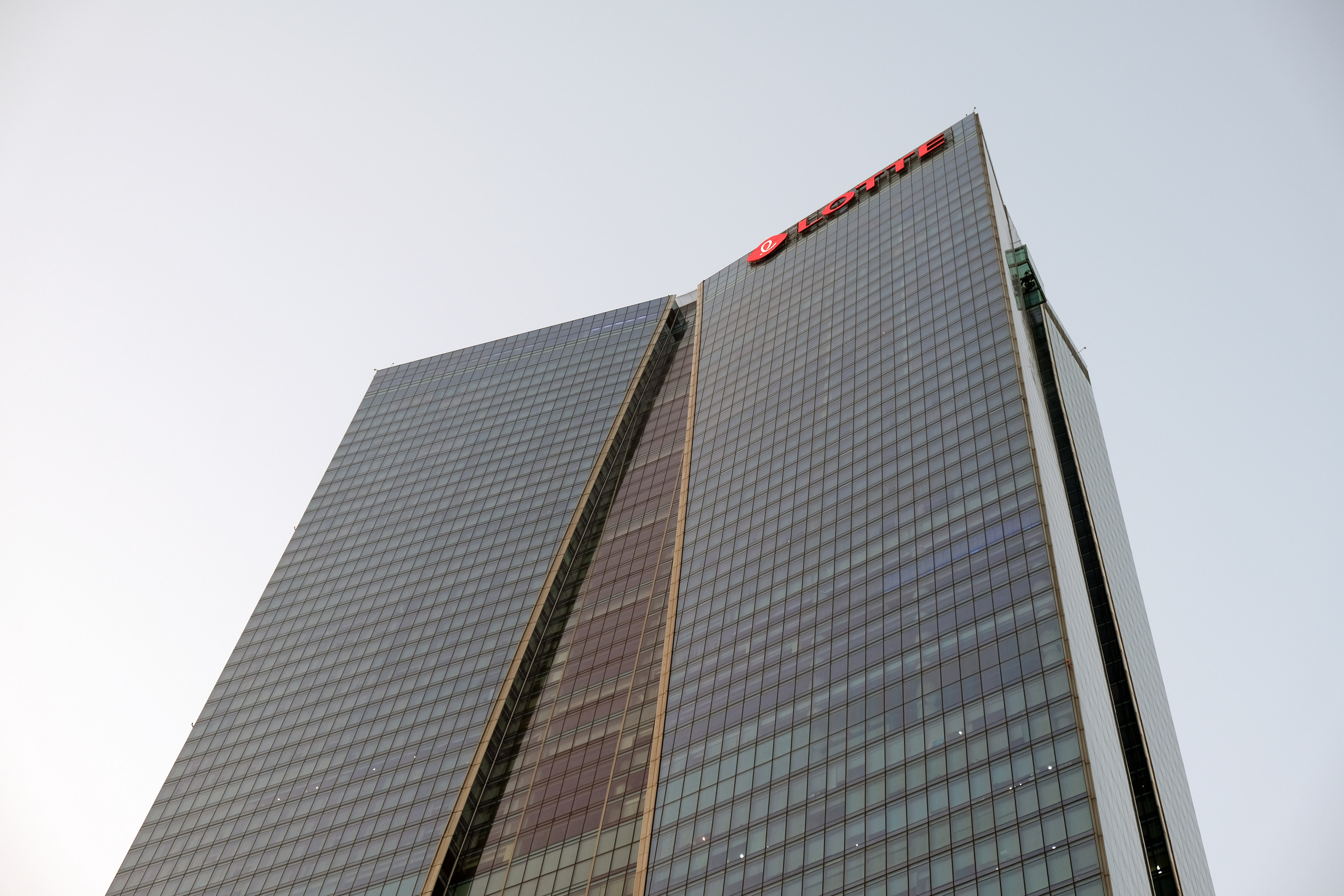
Close-up of top floors

Lotte Tower seen from ground floor

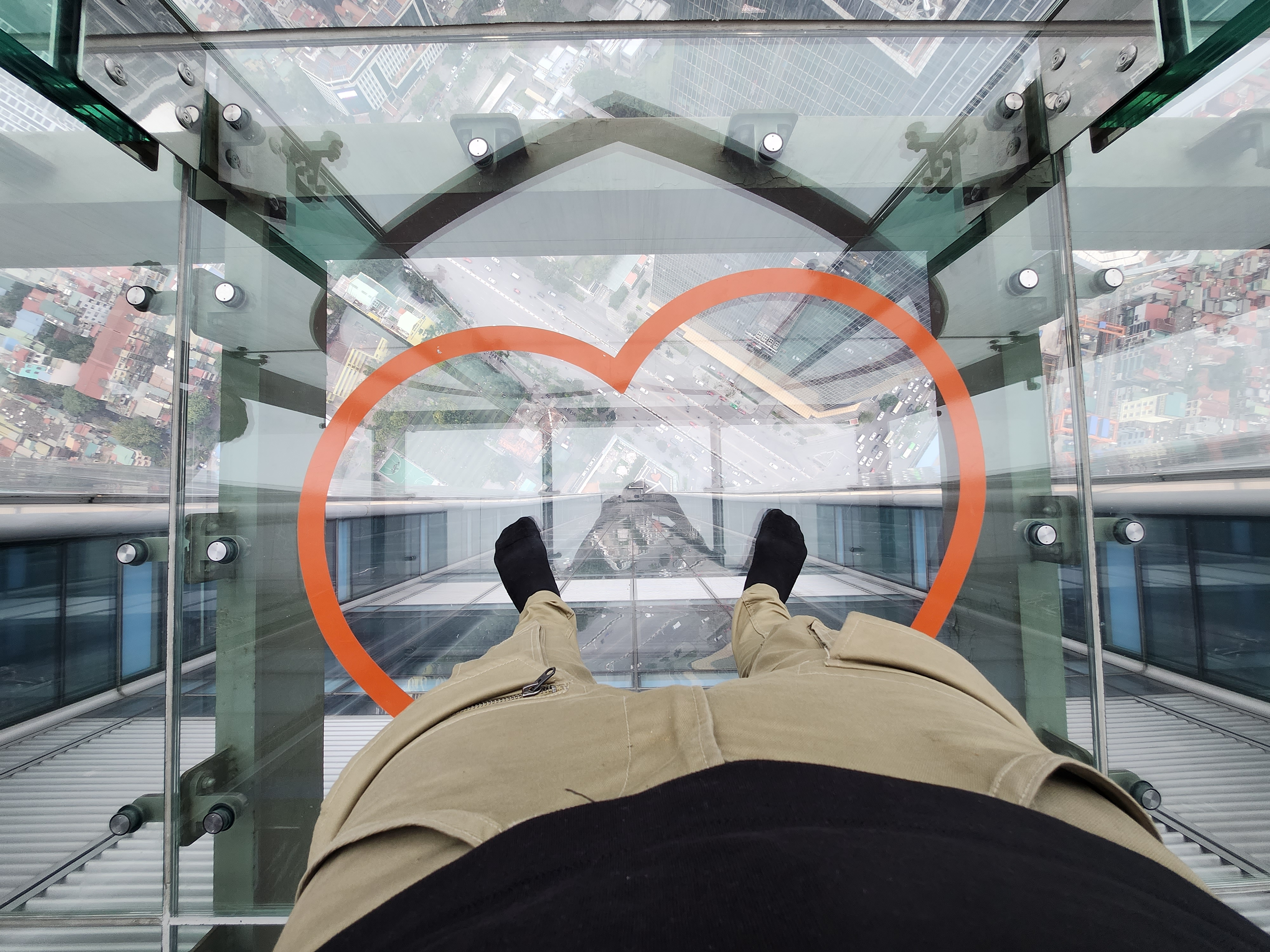
Glass Floor

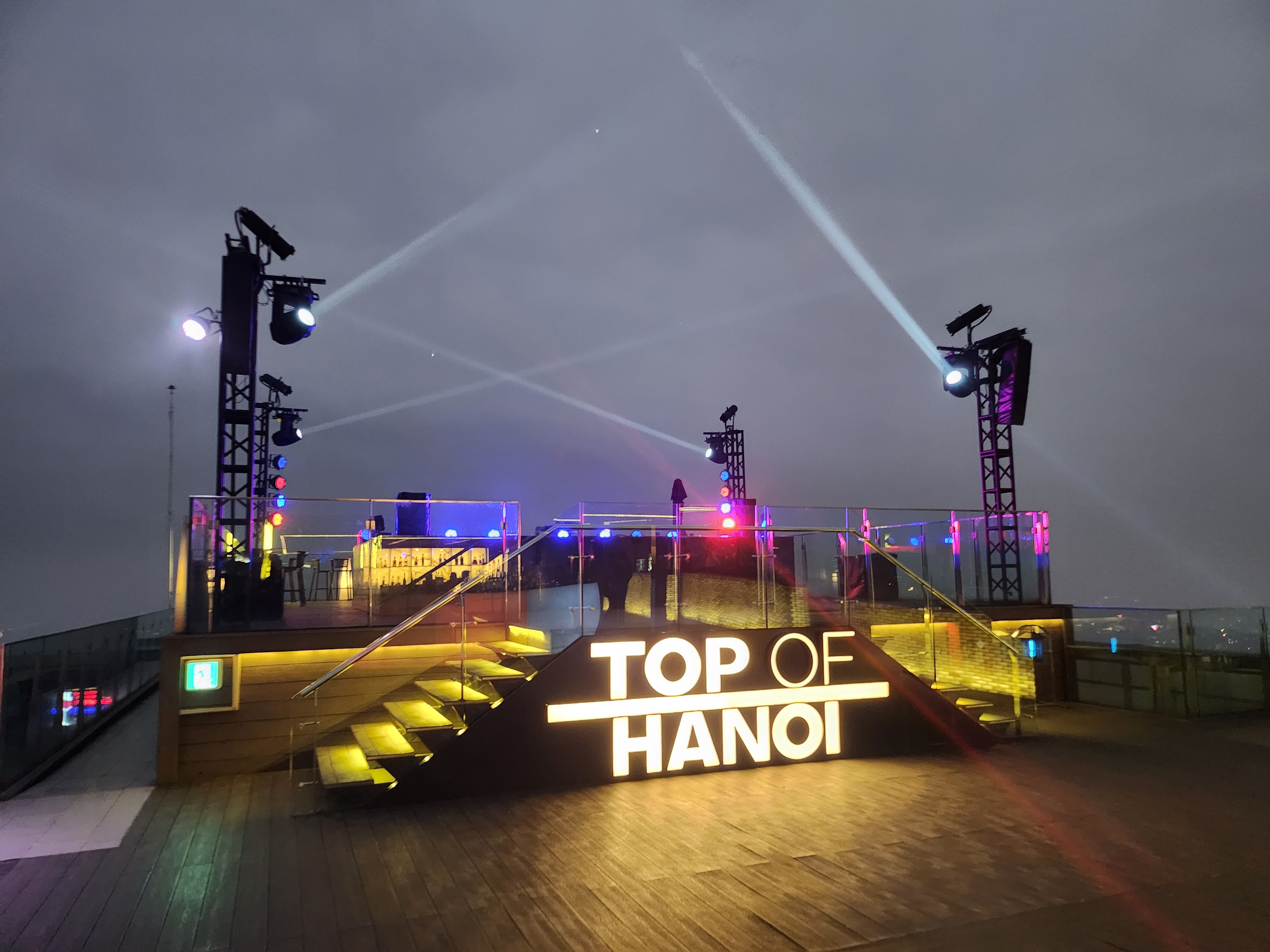
Top of Hanoi rooftop bar
