= Thisofic Tower =

Mixed-use building in Ho Chi Minh City

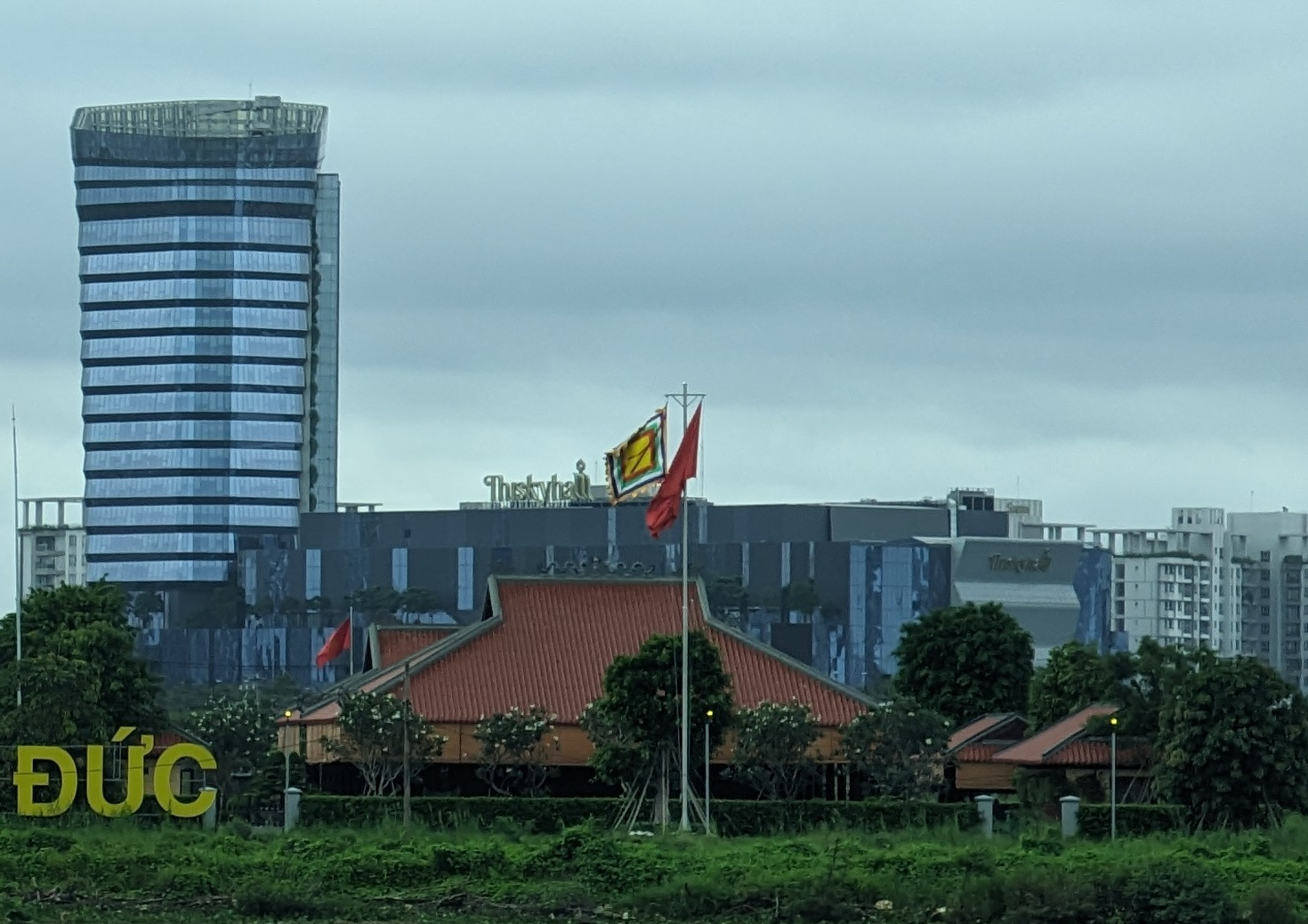
- Sofic Tower and its podium are seen from Bạch Đằng Quay with An Khánh Temple partly covered the building
- Alternative names: Sofic Tower; Zone IIA Tower / Zone IIA HCMC

General information
- Status: Lot 5-5 Tower: Complete; Lot 5-4 Tower: Still not built, temporarily used for car showroom
- Type: Office, shopping mall, convention center
- Architectural style: Neo-futurism
- Location: Zone IIA Complex, Sala City, Thủ Thiêm new urban area, 8–10 Mai Chí Thọ Blvd, An Khánh, Ho Chi Minh City, Vietnam
- Coordinates: 10.772056°N 106.722286°E
- Groundbreaking: September 21, 2015; 11 years ago
- Completed: July 2019; 7 years ago (Office building)
- Inaugurated: November 3, 2022; 4 years ago (Emart Underground Supermarket and podium, including Thiso Mall and Thiskyhall Sala)
- Owner: Đại Quang Minh Real Estate Investment Corporation

Height
- Height: 119 meters (390 ft) or 112.05 meters (367.6 ft)
- Top floor: 20 (103.7 metres (340 ft))

Technical details
- Floor count: 24 (included 4 underground floors)
- Floor area: 145,000 square metres (1,560,000 sq ft)
- Lifts/elevators: 10
- Grounds: 20,270 square metres (218,200 sq ft)

Design and construction
- Architect: Salvador Pérez Arroyo
- Architecture firm: Sdesign Vietnam JSC, Surbana Jurong Private Limited (Façade)
- Developer: Đại Quang Minh Real Estate Investment Corporation
- Main contractor: Coteccons

Other information
- Parking: 3 most-bottom basements (4000 cars + 1000 motorbikes)
- Public transit: L2 L7 Young Pioneer Palace station (planned)

Website
- Thiso Mall Sala

Thisofic Tower or formerly Sofic Tower, initially named as Zone IIA Tower or Zone IIA HCMC, is a complex building in Ho Chi Minh City, Vietnam. At its completion in 2019, it was the first mixed-used and office building to be inaugurated in the Sala City urban development, also the Thủ Thiêm new urban area (briefly called Thủ Thiêm Area). The tower has tally 20 floors with a height of 119 m with 4 basements.

The building is invested and owned by Đại Quang Minh Real Estate Investment Corporation [vi] (Công ty cổ phần đầu tư địa ốc Đại Quang Minh; simply called Đại Quang Minh), a subsidiary of THACO. It is located on Mai Chí Thọ Boulevard (East–West Highway), Thủ Thiêm, Thủ Đức (the former address before 2021 is An Lợi Đông, District 2) and is a part of the Zone IIA complex, a twin-building complex area comprising the lots 5-4 and 5-5 of Functional Area 5 of Thủ Thiêm urban area with the current completed building is in the latter lot, surrounded by streets of Mai Chí Thọ – Nguyễn Cơ Thạch – Hoàng Thế Thiện & D6; and the former is a showroom of THACO AUTO BMW temporarily, it is opposite the building by Nguyễn Cơ Thạch Street and borders with "Catfish" Canal Park (Công viên Rạch Cá Trê; now is Sala Park) but already planned for a building that has similar design and connected by a glass bridge.

== History ==
At the end of 2014, Đại Quang Minh Company invested in main 4 axis roads that cost 8,265 billion VND in Thủ Thiêm Area with a total length of 11.9 km, including: R1 Crescent Boulevard (now Trần Bạch Đằng Boulevard (3.4 km), R2 Central Lake road (now Tố Hữu Street) (3 km), R3 Saigon Riverside Road (now Nguyễn Thiện Thành Street) (3 km), and R4 Elevated Road passing swamp area (now is Bùi Thiện Ngộ Street (2.5 km) with 8 bridges and 2 viaduct on the street) also the Thủ Thiêm Central Square & Riverside Park, Ba Son Bridge and Southern Delta Swamp Park Project (Vùng Châu thổ phía Nam) through a BT form, an alternative form of BOT. This BT form leads to the government traded an over 100 hectares of the Functional Area 5 and 6 in the southeast of Thủ Thiêm Peninsula to build the Sala City urban development, including the Sofic Tower.

Sofic Tower, temporary initial name is Thaco Office – Commercial – Service Building (shortly called Thaco Complex), was groundbreaking in September 21, 2015 and was expected to completed in Q3/2017. However, it was until two years later in Q3/2019, the office tower block was completed and three years later in November 2022, the podium was completed with the inauguration of Thiso Mall (initially known as Socar Mall), Thiskyhall Sala Convention Center and the Emart underground supermarket.

== Features ==
Sofic Tower comprises a 13-story office tower block with an 8-story podium for mall and convention center that entirely in the lot, sharing the 4 basements with 3 from the bottom are used for parking. The building is also headquarters of THACO and its subsidiaries from Level 16 to 18.

| Level | Area | Use / Notable tenants |
|---|---|---|
| 20 | Mechanical level | |
| 19 | Office space tenant area | Trân Oanh Manufacturing And Trading Co. Ltd |
| 18 | Office space tenant area | THACO Group (THADICO, THACO Auto) |
| 17 | Office space tenant area | THACO Group (THADICO, THACO Auto) |
| 16 | Office space tenant area | THACO Group (THADICO, THACO Auto) |
| 15 | Office space tenant area | Maersk |
| 14 | Office space tenant area | Orvia Vietnam LLC, De Heus |
| 13 | Office space tenant area | Caldic Specialties Vietnam |
| 12 | Office space tenant area | LG Electronics Vietnam / Business Innovation Center |
| 11 | Office space tenant area | J&T Express, JTY Transportation, Sands Bosum |
| 10 | Office space tenant area | Electrolux Vietnam - Ho Chi Minh City Branch, Thiên Long Group, Tân Lực South Trading And Service Co. Ltd, Clever World |
| 9 | Office space tenant area | J&T Express |
| 8 | Office space tenant area | Saint-Gobain, Vĩnh Tường Industrial Corporation (Rep. Office) |
| 7 | Thiskyhall Sala Convention Center | Restaurant auxiliary area |
| 6 | Thiskyhall Sala Convention Center | Stellar Hall, Mechanical area for office building |
| 5 | Thiskyhall Sala Convention Center | Grand Skylar Hall, Solar Hall and Sky Garden Café |
| 4 | Thiso Mall Sala | Restaurants, Metashow Lighting Exhibition, Smoking room |
| 3 | Thiso Mall Sala | Galaxy Cinema, FAHASA Sala Book store, F&B, Lifestyle, Kids stores, Roborock, Life 4 Cuts Photobooth, Timezone and TiniPark Playground |
| 2 | Thiso Mall Sala | Fashion, Accessories, Lifestyle, Estelle, PNJ, Tierra Diamond, matsukiyo, The Body Shop, Sociolla, Philips Store |
| 1 | Thiso Mall Sala | Office tenant area lobby, information counter, Peugeot, F&B, Fashion, Accessories, Lifestyle, ViinRiic Galeries de Parfums, Swarovski |
| B1 | Thiso Mall Sala | Emart Sala, Don Don, Gong Cha, Highlands Coffee, Katsuya, KFC, Liao Liao, Long Monaco, Passio, Pizza Hut, Spicy Box, Photo Time booth, Pick Me claw machine, Kidscamp – Children play's area |
| B2–B4 | Parking lots (Medical room in B2) | |

=== Notes: ===
- Mechanical area for the podium at Level 8
- Restaurants and F&B brands in Level 1, 3 and 4:
  - Level 4: Chang Kang Kung (L4 - 06), Manwah (L4 - 7–8), Gogi House (L4 - 7-8), Kichi-Kichi (L4 - 7–8), Chilli Thái (L4 - 12), Siam Sugar (L4 - 12), Thai Express (L4 - 03), Sushi Kei (L4 - 11), K-Pub (L4 - 7–8), Khao Lao (L4 - 11), Hotpot Story (L4 - 11), iSushi (L4 - 7–8), Ngõ Sài Gòn – Vietnamese Eatery (L4 - 05), Cơm Tấm Mộc (L4 - 12), King BBQ (L4 - 04), Cloud Pot (L4 - 02), Wow! Yakiniku (L4 - 01), Dao Niu Guo (L4 - 01–02), Ashima (L4 - 07), Pizza 360 (L4 - 02a), Red Junk - Hong Kong Fusion (L4 - 13)
  - Level 3: Dookki (L3 - 10), Meat&Meet (L3 - 08), New Zealand Natural (L3 - K3–04), Candy Crush (L3 - K3–05), Minimelts (L3 - K3–07)
  - Level 1: El Gaucho Argentinian Steakhouse (L1 - 04), BESO Café (L1 - 01), Katinat Coffee & Tea House (L1 - 15), Paris Baguette (L1 - 03), Pizza 4P's (L1 - 01), Phê La (L1 - 12), Phúc Long (L1 - 19), Starbucks (L1 - 06)
- Lifestyle stores: Himalaya (L3 - K3-08), Atrium (L3 - 19), DeRucci & Vinabedding (L3 - 18), Amara-Home (L3-16), ATZ Organic (L2 - K2-13), Sakos (L2 - K2-19), Jysk (L2 - 16), Komo (L1 - 26), Face Wash Fox (L1 - 17a), QB House (L1 - 17), Pop Mart (L1 - 05), Dyson (L1 - K1-10)
- Kid toys stores: Mykingdom, Deer Store
- Fashion stores: ABC-Mart Grand Stage (L2 - 02–03), Aldo (L2 - K2-09), Adidas (L2 - 24–25), Crocs (L2 - 06), K-Swiss (L2-05), Skechers (L2 - 04), Xtep (L2 - 23), ADLV (L2 - 07), Melissa (L2 - K2–15), Muji (L2 - 01), Valentino Creations (L2 - 10), Calvin Klein (L1 - 10), HLA (L1 - 22), Levi's (L1 - 23), Tommy Hilfiger (L1 - 13), Uniqlo (L1 - 21), Wilson (L1 - 08–09)
- Accessories stores: American Tourister (L2 - K2-08), Megane Prince (L2 - K2–14), Owndays (L1 - 14), Eyewear Hut (L1 - 16)

== Awards ==
The building was nominated twice at Ashui Awards for Future Project of The Year in 2018 as Zone IIA HCMC and Building of The Year in 2023, it was in the top 5 most voted for both categories (the latter was runner-up).

== Gallery ==
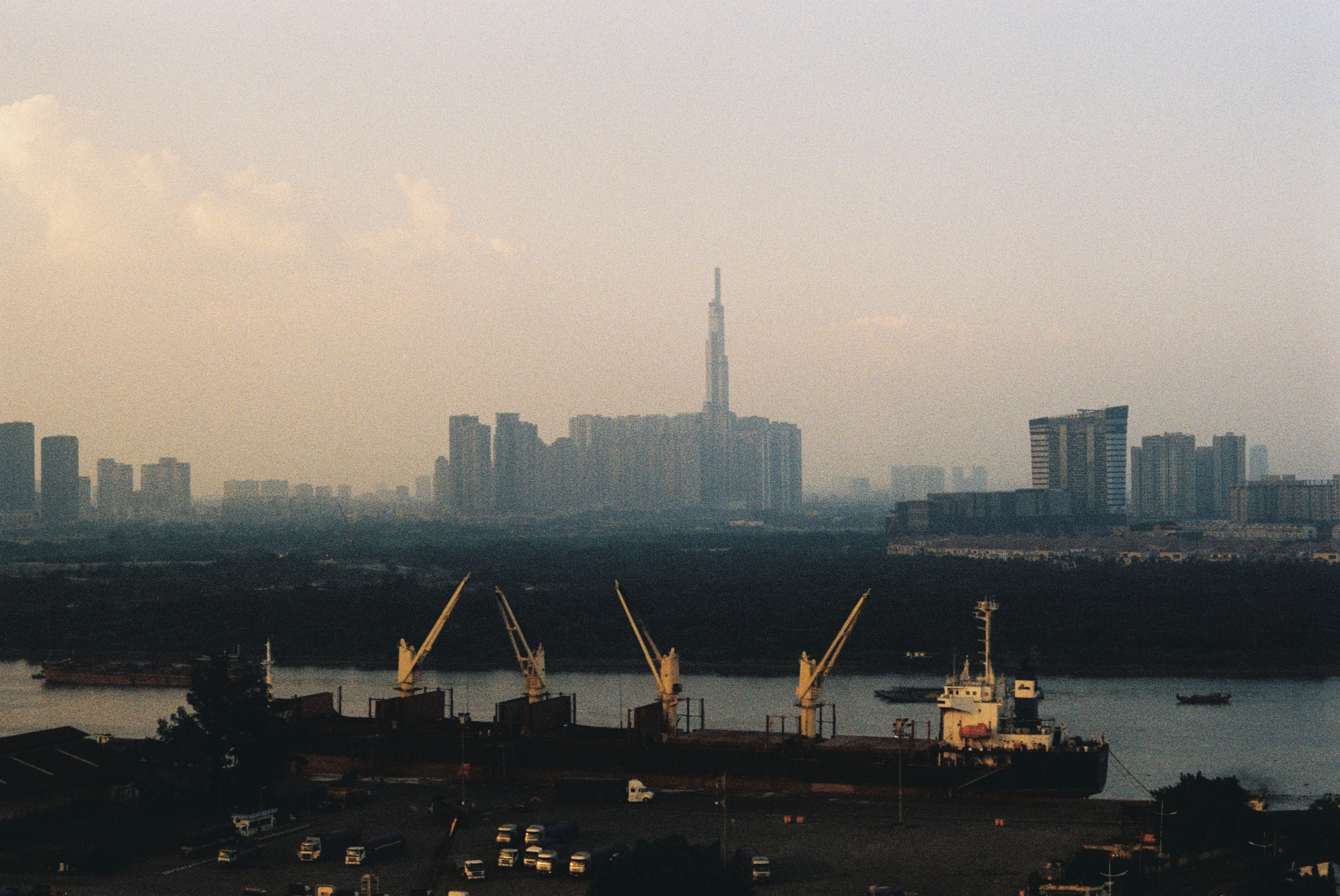
Sofic Tower hanging garden facade looked from Nhà Rồng – Khánh Hội Port in November 2019

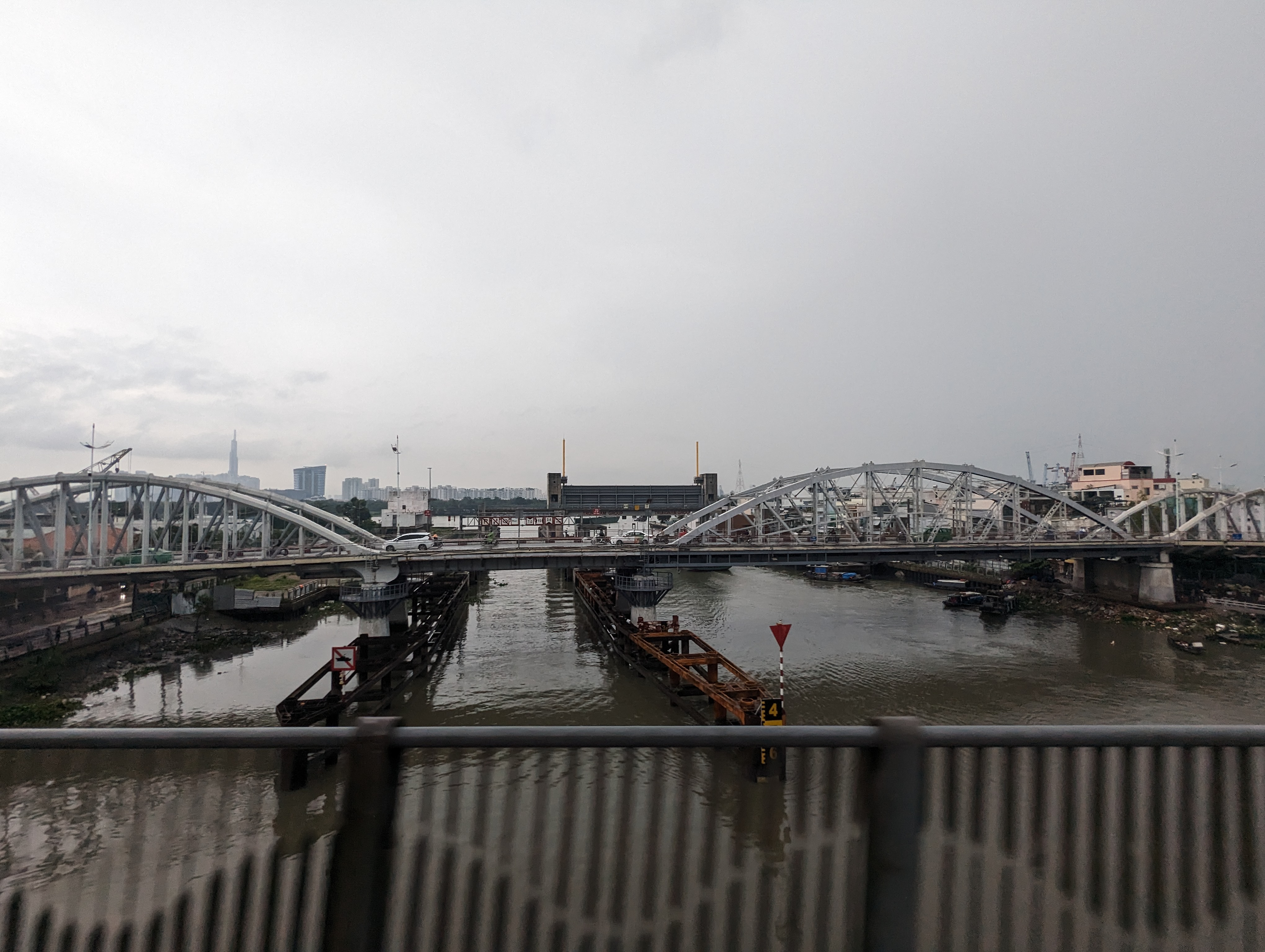
The tower (next to the left arch abutment) is seen from Tân Thuận Bridge on Saigon Sightseeing Bus in July 2023

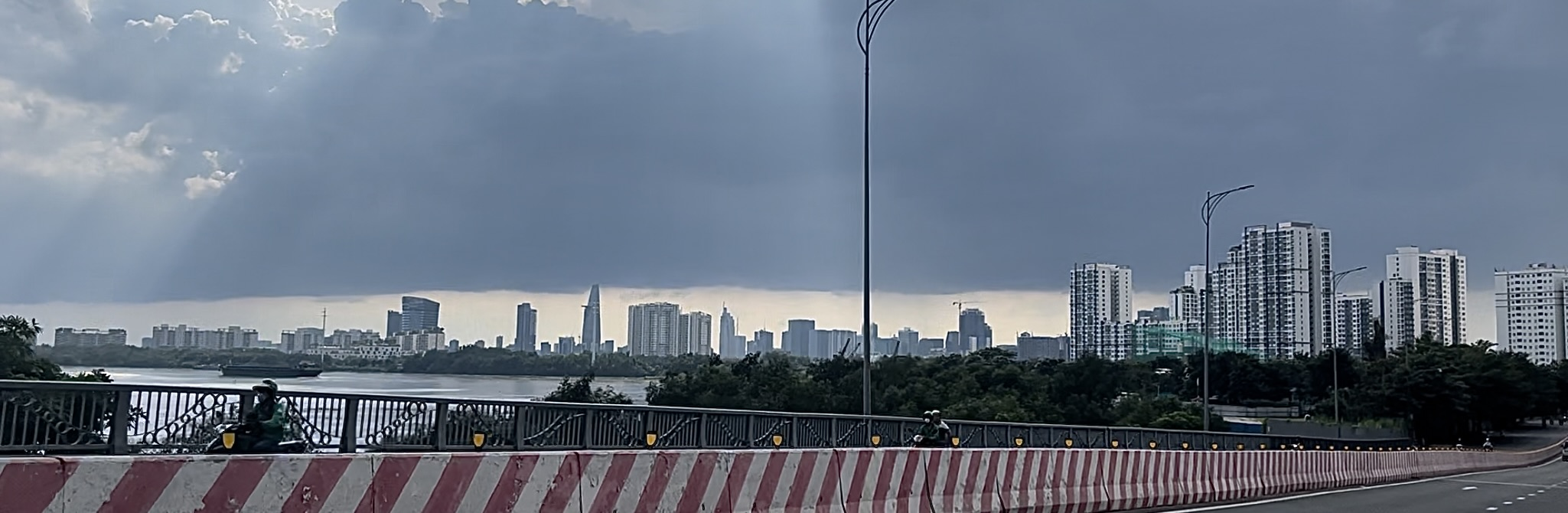
The tower (on the left) is seen from Diamond Island, Thủ Đức in September 2023

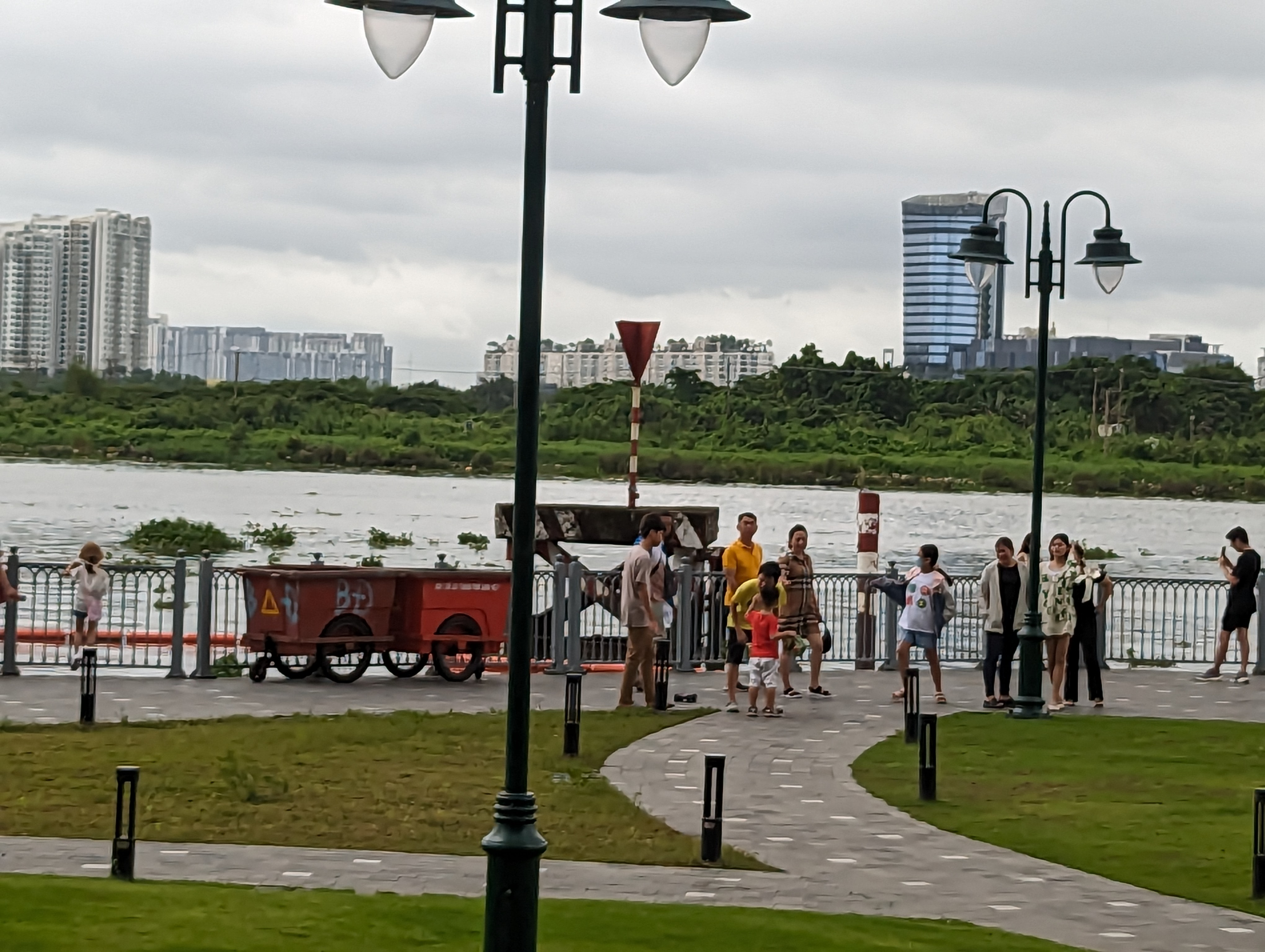
The tower seen from Bạch Đằng Quay on Saigon Sightseeing Bus in July 2023

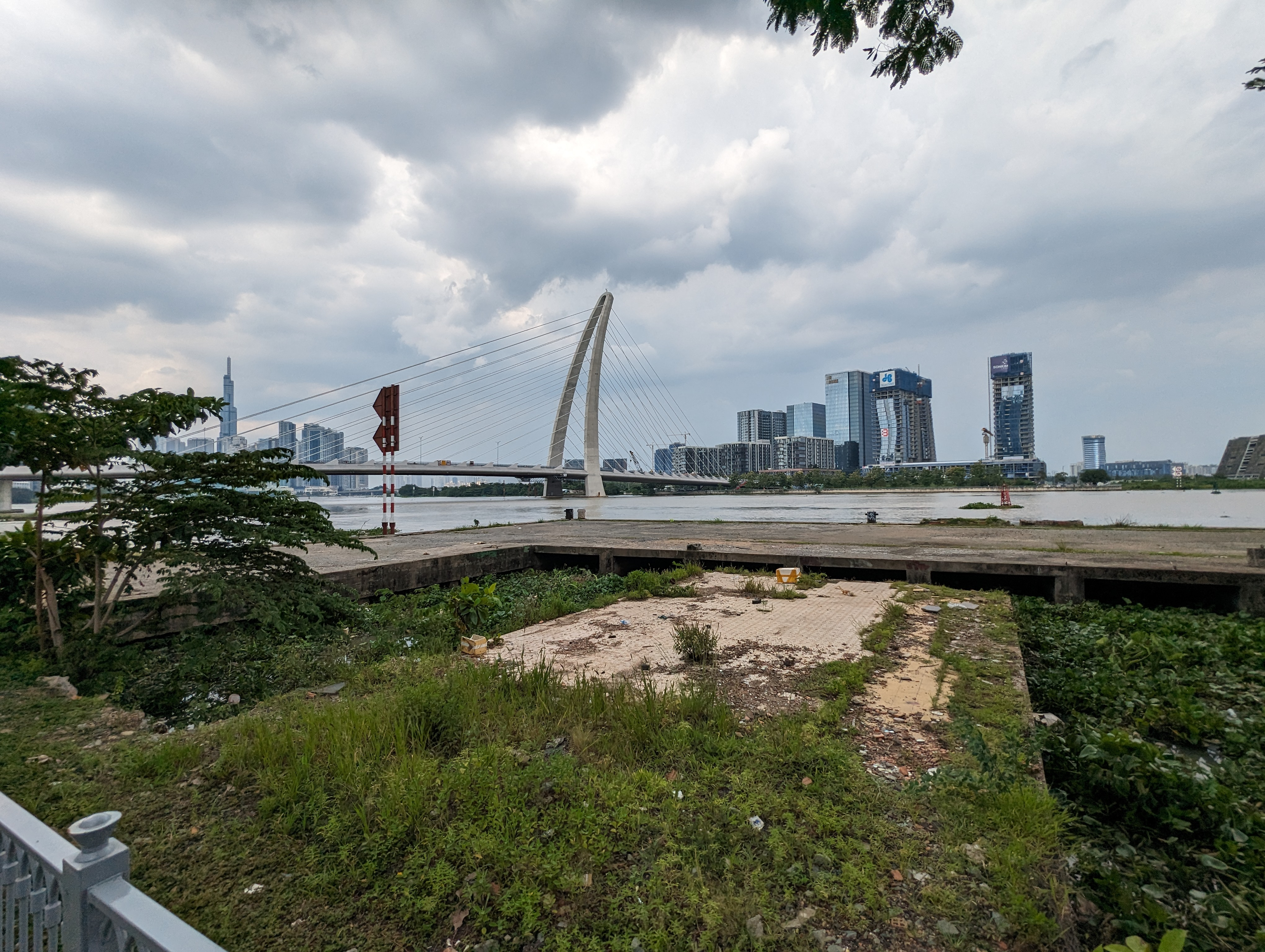
The tower (to the right of The Opera Residence) seen from Bạch Đằng Quay, the section opposite the Tôn Đức Thắng Museum in July 2023

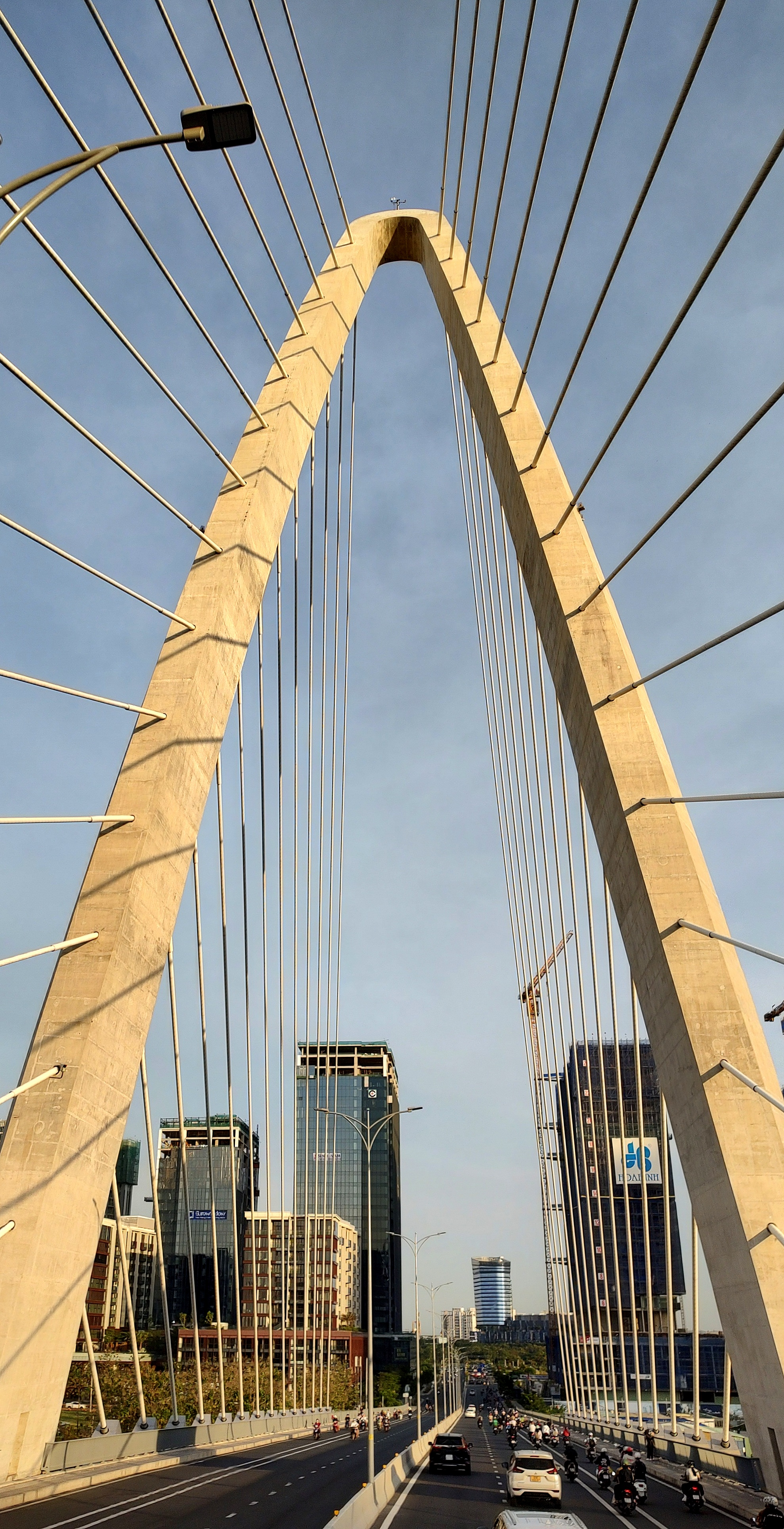
The tower (in the middle) is seen from Ba Son Bridge in February 2023

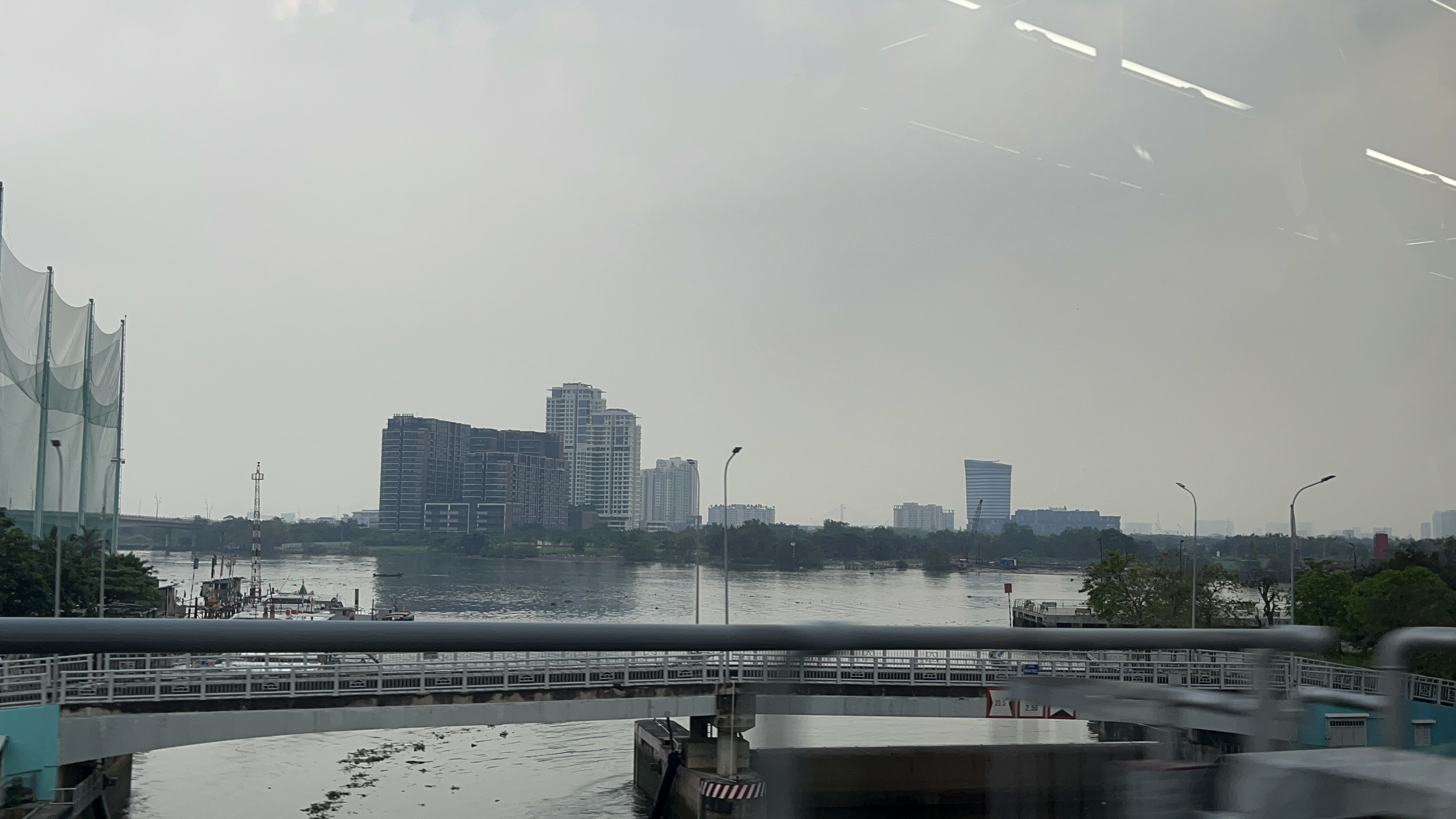
The tower is seen from the place of former Ba Son Shipyard, now is Ba Son Complex and Ba Son station, on a train of Ho Chi Minh City Metro Line 1 in 2025
