= Trần Bá Dương =

Vietnamese billionaire

- Born: April 1, 1960 (age 66); Huế, South Vietnam
- Citizenship: Vietnam
- Education: Ho Chi Minh City University of Technology
- Occupations: Chairman of THACO; Director of Dai Quang Minh Real Estate Investment Corporation
- Organization: THACO
- Known for: Founder of THACO
- Spouse: Viên Diệu Hoa
- Children: Trần Viên Ngọc Trân (F); Trần Viên Ngọc Oanh (F)

Trần Bá Dương (born 1960 in Huế) is a Vietnamese entrepreneur. He is the founder of Vietnamese automobile producer THACO. In addition, he is also known as the General Director of Dai Quang Minh Real Estate Investment Joint Stock Company.

Mr. Tran Ba Duong was recognized by Forbes as having assets of 1.76 billion USD (March 6, 2018). According to Forbes' profile, by 2016, Thaco became the largest automobile company in Vietnam with an automobile market share of 32%.

== Biography ==
Dương was born in 1960 in Huế. He graduated with a degree in mechanical engineering from Ho Chi Minh City University of Technology in 1983.

He started his career by working as a repair technician at Dong Nai auto repair factory. He then gradually worked his way up to a managing position.

In 1997, he founded THACO, which has grown to become the largest automobile producer in Vietnam.

In 2013, he stepped down as CEO of THACO, but retained his position as the company's chairman.

Dương and his family hold a major share in THACO.

As of March 2018, Dương was recognized by Forbes to own a total fortune of US$1.76 billion. According to Forbes' documentation, by 2016, Thaco was the largest automobile company in Vietnam - with a market share of 32%.
