= New Seasons Market =

Grocery store chain based in Portland, Oregon, U.S.

- Type: Grocer
- Industry: Retail
- Founded: 1999
- Founders: Brian Rohter; Stan Amy; Chuck Eggert (Note: The main three founders. The families of Rohter, Amy, and Eggert and about 50 of their friends were also involved in the first stores opening.)
- Headquarters: Portland, Oregon
- Number of locations: 22 (2025)
- Key people: CEO: Dave Kauder
- Products: Local and conventional foods, homegoods, deli meats and baked goods.
- Number of employees: 2,700+ (2022)
- Parent: Good Food Holdings (subsidiary of Emart; 2020–present)
- Website: newseasonsmarket.com

New Seasons Market is a chain of neighborhood grocery stores operating in the Portland, Oregon metro area, and southwestern Washington. Some of the products offered are organic and produced locally in the Pacific Northwest, but conventional groceries are also sold.

Founded locally in 1999, the company was majority acquired by private equity firm Endeavour Capital in 2013 and purchased California-based New Leaf Community Markets in 2013, which it later sold. In 2019, it was sold to Good Food Holdings, a subsidiary of South Korean retail conglomerate Emart.

The company currently operates 22 stores in the greater Portland/Vancouver metropolitan area, including Hillsboro, Beaverton, Happy Valley, Vancouver, Tualatin, Lake Oswego and Milwaukie. The company has faced criticism and a worker unionization drive starting in 2022 has led 11 Portland-area stores to vote to unionize and the National Labor Relations Board to charge New Seasons Market with unfair labor practices in regard to anti-union activity.

== History ==
New Seasons Market was founded in the Raleigh Hills neighborhood in the metropolitan area of Portland, Oregon, in 1999 by three families and 50 friends. By 2008, it had grown to nine stores and about 1,800 employees. By November 2013, New Seasons had grown to 15 stores and 3,000 employees, when it purchased California-based New Leaf Community Markets and New Leaf founder Scott Roseman joined the New Seasons Board. In June 2013, New Seasons became the first grocery store to be B Corporation certified. The company earned re-certification in 2015 and 2017.

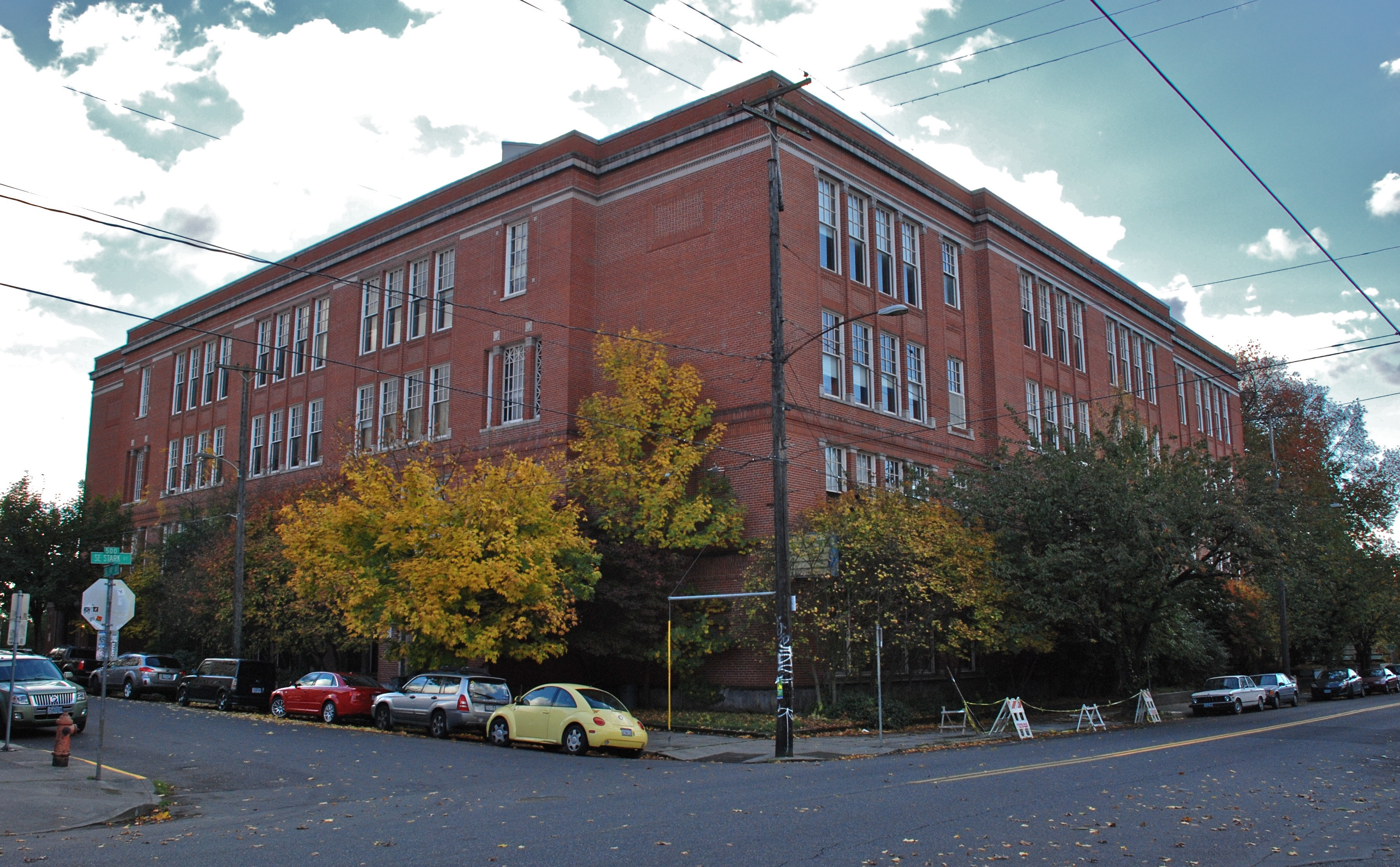
New Seasons corporate headquarters in the former Washington High School building

In November 2013, Endeavour Capital, an investment firm, invested $17.5 million in New Seasons Market, according to U.S. Securities and Exchange Commission filings. Bradaigh Wagner and Stephen Babson, managing directors at Endeavour, later got seats on the board of New Seasons Market. In December 2017, New Seasons Market employees and the Northwest Accountability Project asked B Lab to review the company's B Corp certification based on claims of anti-union activity and Endeavour's financial ties to the M.J. Murdock Charitable Trust.

In February 2018 CEO, Wendy Collie stepped down amid a failed expansion into California and an active employee union organizing campaign. Also in February 2018, two New Leaf stores in California ended their franchisee relationship with the company citing "big changes at the company".

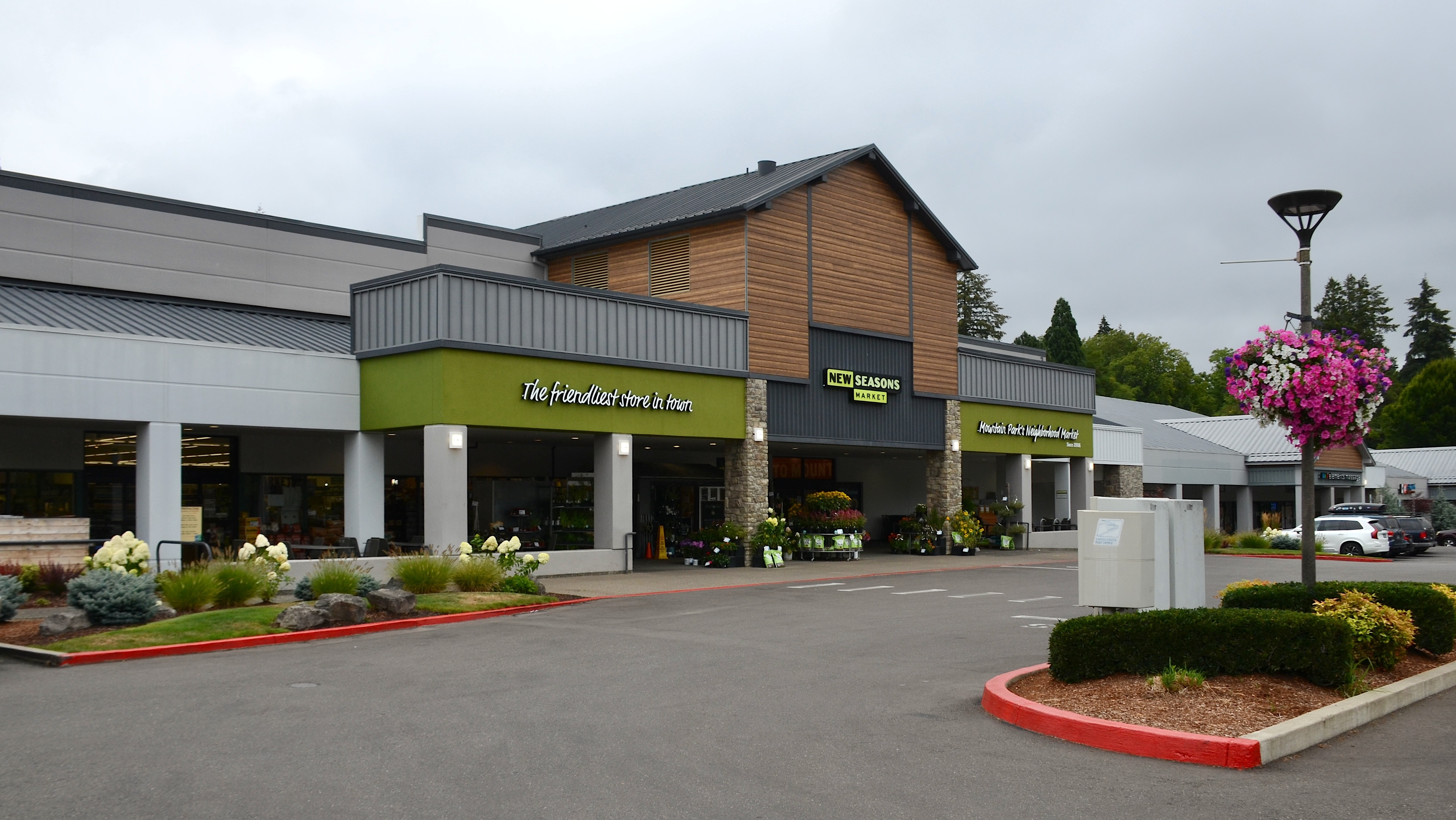
Store in Lake Oswego

In December 2019, parent company Endeavour Capital announced that it would be selling the grocery chain to South Korean retailer E-mart, specifically to its West Coast grocery chain subsidiary, Good Food Holdings, in a sale transaction that was finalized in early 2020. Details of the transaction include the retention of CEO Forrest Hoffmaster (who later departed in March 2021), the continuance of the organization as a B Corp, the halt of existing plans for expanding the chain, the closure of the store located in the Ballard neighborhood in Seattle, the sale of New Leaf Community Markets to Good Food Holdings as a separate subsidiary, and transition of the Mercer Island store to a Metropolitan Market, which is also owned by Good Food Holdings. With the sale, the company reiterated its commitment "to B Corp standards and will continue to support the regional food economy to help solve social and economic problems, including giving 10% of after-tax profits to the local community." New Seasons Market also introduced a mission advisory council, "chartered with ensuring continuity of the companies' social and community benefit, will provide guidance to the board of directors and company leadership." Nancy Lebold joined New Seasons Market as CEO in April 2021.

In May 2022, employees at stores in the Portland metropolitan area began attempts towards seeking unionization. Employees cited "changes to the company's culture and business ethics" as primary reasons behind why they began organizing. In late May 2022, New Seasons hired Ogletree Deakins, a law firm that often assists companies in campaigns against union drives, claiming the firm would help them "navigate the nuances of federal labor law". In August 2022 survey results released by Forbes Magazine in collaboration with Statista, the company was ranked 3rd overall out of employers in Oregon.

The National Labor Relations Board charged New Seasons with unfair labor practices in January 2023 after employees, in collaboration with the United Food & Commercial Workers Local 555, filed complaints and claimed that the company had "unlawfully threatened to rescind benefits and rewards to employees that they had been receiving in the event the employees unionized." The company and union settled on a rerun, which took place in February 2024, and staff once again voted against UFCW Local 555 representation.

In May 2024, CEO Nancy Lebold was appointed the President of the Western Association of Food Chains (WAFC) and also serves on the board, a position held concurrently with being CEO at New Seasons Market. As of 2024, New Seasons Market's B Corp. rating had dropped to 80.4 by 2021 (prior to worker unionization drives) from a high of 120.5 in 2013 - just above the 80.0 score required for B Corp certification.

=== Lobbying ===
After encouraging vendors to voluntarily certify their products as GMO free in 2013, New Seasons publicly endorsed the GMO labeling campaign, Oregon Right to Know, in 2014, with continued public advocacy for non-GMO labeling and certification in 2017. In 2014, New Seasons Market also publicly endorsed the marriage equality campaign, Oregon United for Marriage. The following year, the grocer supported raising the minimum wage in Oregon by testifying at the Oregon State Senate hearings. New Seasons Market was in favor of Measure 26–199 in the Oregon's November 2018 election, advocating for affordable housing for residents in the Portland metro area. At the same time, the company announced opposition to Measure 105, which sought to repeal Oregon law prohibiting the use of state and local resources to enforce federal immigration law. As of 2020, New Seasons Market is a participant in the Pacific Coast Food Waste Commitment, a voluntary agreement for food businesses to publicly commit to decrease food waste 50% by 2030. In 2021, New Seasons Market actively engaged with Oregon state legislators on the passage of the Recycling Modernization Act, aimed at reducing plastic pollution and creating a more equitable materials' management infrastructure. The following year, New Seasons Market executives Nancy Lebold and Athena Petty signed a letter to President Joe Biden with other national brands to advocate for the passage of the Inflation Reduction Act with regard to green infrastructure investments.

== Controversies ==
=== Gentrification ===
When New Seasons opened stores in the North Williams and St. Johns neighborhoods of Portland, some residents questioned if the stores would contribute to the gentrification of these historically black and working-class neighborhoods. In an interview with The Oregonian newspaper in 2015 former head of store development, Jerry Chevasuss said that the grocery store targets neighborhoods in the process of gentrification, and that often the addition of a New Seasons will push rents and home values higher, adding to that process.

Some long-time Seattle residents voiced concerns that a planned store in the Central District, a formerly red-lined, historically black, neighborhood in Seattle currently undergoing rapid gentrification, would cater to new residents and not serve existing communities. Seattle labor organizations and neighborhood groups also objected to a Mercer Island store for similar reasons.

=== M.J. Murdock Charitable Trust ===
New Seasons Market faced criticism from LGBTQ advocacy groups and the Northwest Accountability Project for its former majority owner Endeavour Capital's financial relationship with the M.J. Murdock Charitable Trust, one of the investors in the Endeavour Capital fund, with an investment representing less than 1.5% of Endeavour's Fund V, that had a majority ownership stake in New Seasons Market until the company's purchase by Emart in 2020. Activists pointed out the trust's history of donating money to groups with controversial public positions, such as the Alliance Defending Freedom, Focus on the Family, Freedom Foundation, and "crisis pregnancy centers" throughout the Pacific Northwest. New Seasons Market maintained that the actions of the Murdock Trust had no bearing on the operations of New Seasons Market during that time. In 2017 some New Seasons Market employees joined with the Northwest Accountability Project to petition B Lab for New Seasons Market's B Corp certification to be reviewed due to the company's connection to the M.J. Murdock Charitable Trust through Endeavour Capital.

=== Unionization ===
==== 2017 ====
In October 2017 Portland-based employees at New Seasons Market formed the group New Seasons Workers United and launched a public campaign to improve working conditions at their stores. Employees cited changes implemented since Endeavour Capital acquired majority ownership as a major impetus for organizing. Subsequently, New Seasons Market hired the union-avoidance firm Cruz and Associates, notable for its unsuccessful contract with Trump Hotels to prevent unionization of the hotel's employees. New Seasons Market faced criticism and two National Labor Relations Board charges alleging illegal retaliation when they fired two employees who had appeared in a union flyer. The charges were later dismissed. Future Oregon Governor Tina Kotek rallied with employees outside of the Arbor Lodge location in support of unionization.

==== New Seasons Labor Union ====
In May 2022, employees at stores in the Portland metropolitan area began attempts towards seeking unionization, organizing separately with the newly founded independent New Seasons Labor Union and UFCW Local 555, with the NSLU being founded with the intention of unionized workers being independent from the UFCW. New Seasons Market in response, for the second time, hired a lawyer from Ogletree, Deakins, Nash, Smoak & Stewart. New Seasons came under criticism for the move with some commentors noting that the firm previously had experience advising businesses associated with Donald Trump. The law firm also was previously hired by the local Portland business Powell's Books during worker unionizations. The Seven Corners location filed with the National Labor Relations Board under New Seasons Labor Union, and the Orenco Station location filed through the representation of the UFCW. Workers at the Seven Corners location specifically accused New Seasons Market of "sowing distrust" amongst staff and filed unfair labor practice charges with the NLRB wherein they claimed the company was engaging in retaliatory measures with managers removing pro-union materials and with CEO Nancy Lebold sending out a letter that workers felt was "coercing employees" to not seek a union, wherein she stated that "a union is unnecessary for staff at a progressive and independent grocer like ours." The company responded by stating they were "committed to collaboration" with workers on decisions to unionize.

On June 23, 2022, workers at the Sellwood location filed with the NLRB under representation from the NSLU to unionize. Workers at the Slabtown in downtown Portland location also filed on August 15. On September 1, 2022, workers represented by the UFCW lost the union election at the Orenco Station store in Hillsboro by a vote of 60 to 37.

On September 7, 2022, workers represented by the NSLU won the union election at the Seven Corners store, marking the first ever New Seasons Market to vote to unionize, by a vote of 62 to 15. Just a day later, workers at the Sellwood location represented by the NSLU lost their union election by a vote of 33 to 29. On September 16, 2022, workers under the NSLU at the Woodstock location filed to unionize, and in October 2022 staff represented by the NSLU at the Concordia and Grant Park locations also filed.

On October 14, 2022, representatives from the United Food and Commercial Workers filed unfair labor practice complaints with the National Labor Relations Board alleging that New Seasons Market engaged in retaliatory tactics and fired an employee at the Orenco Station location that was involved in unionizing workers. On October 20, 2022, workers at the Slabtown location under the NSLU voted to unionize by a vote of 62–14. On November 15, 2022, workers at the Arbor Lodge location filed to unionize, and by November 28, 2022, over half of all New Seasons Market stores had filed to unionize, with 10 of 19 filing with the National Labor Relations Board, with workers at the Cedar Hills location in Beaverton, Oregon, filing to unionize under the NSLU on that same day.

On December 9, 2022, workers under the NSLU at the Woodstock location voted to unionize by a vote of 80–18, and on December 13, 2022, the Grant Park location voted to unionize by a vote of 72–22, and as of December 2023, 11 locations were unionized. One of the early external organizers to help the New Seasons Labor Union was the organization Jobs with Justice, the founder of which, Mark Medina, formerly worked for Burgerville and engaged in efforts to unionize Burgerville workers under the Burgerville Workers Union.

On January 13, 2023, it was found by the National Labor Relations Board that New Seasons Market engaged in unfair labor practices in regard to their attempts to stop union activities at the Orenco Station store. According to a union representative, the company threatened employees based on benefits availability in regard to unionizing. New Seasons Market released a statement disagreeing with the National Labor Relations Board findings. The company and union settled on a rerun, which took place in February 2024, and staff once again voted against UFCW Local 555 representation.

The following September, workers at the 10 of the 11 unionized locations staged a one-day unfair labor practice strike, which happened concurrently with a week long strike at Portland Fred Meyer locations.

Workers at all 11 stores unionized under the NSLU voted to strike on November 27, 2024, the day before Thanksgiving, and called for customers to boycott the company until a "fair contract could be reached," citing the 2 years it has taken for a union contract to be negotiated with the company, also accusing the company of proposing "non-starter" ideas during bargaining sessions. Workers pointed to the company proposing to cut wages to $20 an hour for all union workers and cutting health insurance benefits in response to demands for "living wages" based around $27 per hour. New Seasons Market countered by referencing the three-year period it took for Burgerville workers to reach a contract, releasing a statement saying the company is "committed to finding common ground."

The Collective Bargaining Agreement of the New Seasons Labor Union guarantees "reasonable seating" for cashiers, which is "defined as a seat that permits the safe performance of a task from a seated position."
