= Bristol Farms =

California-based upscale grocery chain

- Company type: Subsidiary
- Industry: Retail
- Founded: 1982 Rolling Hills Estates, California
- Headquarters: Carson, California
- Key people: Adam Caldecott; President & CEO
- Parent: Good Food Holdings (2020–present)
- Website: www.bristolfarms.com www.lazyacres.com

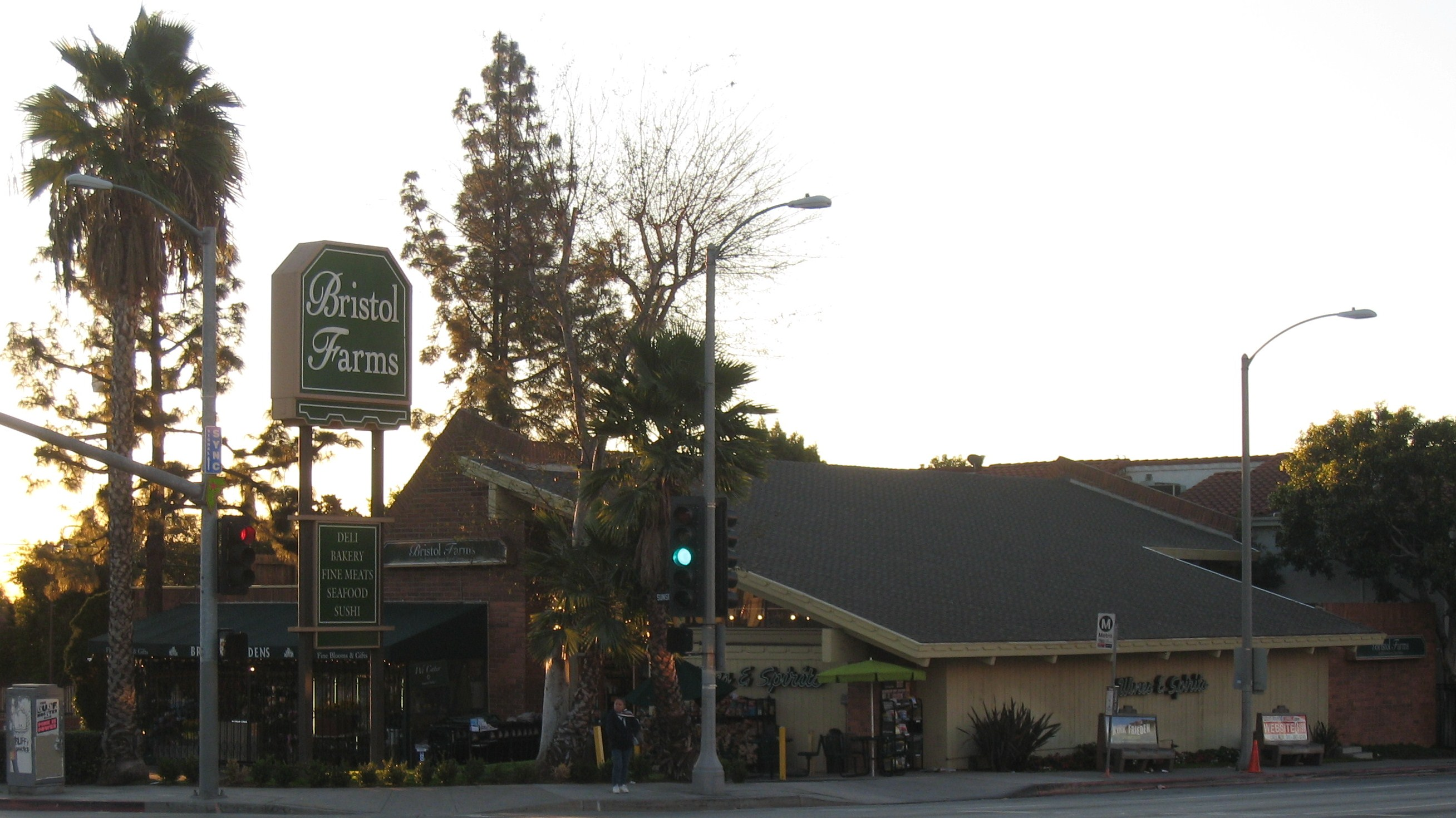
Bristol Farms store on Sunset Boulevard in West Hollywood, California

Bristol Farms is an upscale grocery store chain in California, United States. Founded in Los Angeles County, Bristol Farms operates 14 stores throughout Southern California: The company is currently owned by Good Food Holdings.

== History ==
=== Early history ===
Bristol Farms opened its first store in 1982 in Rolling Hills Estates, California. The company was started by Irv Gronsky and Mike Burbank, who had worked together for almost twenty years in the food industry. Their vision was to combine the service and food quality of a corner grocer, butcher, and baker with the theatre of Harrods in London. The first store was an overwhelming success.

The company went on to add stores in California. In June 1999, they acquired a famous landmark, the Chalet Gourmet in West Hollywood, California.

=== Albertsons era ===
In September 2004, Bristol Farms was purchased by Albertsons, Inc.

In October 2005, Bristol Farms purchased Santa Barbara–based Lazy Acres. Independently owned, the Lazy Acres store was sold to Bristol Farms allegedly as a defensive move against Whole Foods' pending arrival in Santa Barbara. This was Bristol Farms' first location in Santa Barbara. The 28,000-square-foot (2,600 m^{2}) Lazy Acres store itself continues to operate under its original format. The Bristol Farms name does not appear on Lazy Acres signage or advertisements.

In 2006, Bristol Farms opened its doors at the newly expanded Westfield San Francisco Centre in downtown San Francisco. The San Francisco site covered over half of the concourse in the mall's lower level. This location closed on January 27, 2017, leaving Bristol Farms without a location in Northern California.

Four former Albertsons locations have been converted into Bristol Farms: one in San Diego's La Jolla neighborhood (originally a Big Bear market), the second in Palm Desert (originally a Lucky), a third location in Los Angeles' Westchester neighborhood (which had also been a Lucky), and a fourth in Santa Monica.

=== Supervalu era ===
On June 2, 2006, Bristol Farms' parent company, Albertsons, Inc., was purchased by investors led by Cerberus Capital Management and Supervalu, Inc. Upon the transaction's close, Bristol Farms became a wholly owned subsidiary of Supervalu.

On November 12, 2008, Bristol Farms opened its 17th location. This 30,000-square-foot (2,800 m^{2}) location, unlike many of Bristol Farms' then-current locations, was built new from the ground up. The store is located in the Bridgeport Marketplace mixed-use shopping center within the Bridgeport residential neighborhood in Santa Clarita, California. New features at this location are individual "shops" with full façades and themed props, a fresh juice and smoothie counter, a fresh sushi department with sushi made onsite every day, a coffee bar, and an eat-in café. The wine area, with its four walls, wine racks, and roof trellis, resembles a specialty wine boutique. Over 1,500 sq ft (140 m^{2}) of hand-painted murals by studio artists at D.L. English Design depict picturesque scenes of the Santa Clarita Valley throughout the store.

=== Independently owned ===
On October 29, 2010, Supervalu announced that it had sold the Bristol Farms chain to a new company formed by a private investment firm, Endeavour Capital, and the chain's management team.

=== Good Food Holdings era ===
In 2012, Good Food Holdings acquired the Metropolitan Market of Seattle.

Bristol Farms, Lazy Acres Market, and Metropolitan Market are all sister companies currently owned by California-based private holding company Good Food Holdings, Inc.

The Long Beach Bristol Farms was converted into a second Lazy Acres in November 2012.

Good Food Holdings, Inc. was acquired in 2018 by Emart, South Korea's largest retailer, for $275 million.

In December 2019, owner Endeavour Capital announced that it would be selling the grocery chain New Seasons Market to E-mart, specifically to its subsidiary, Good Food Holdings, in a sale transaction that was finalized in early 2020. Details of the transaction include the retention of CEO Forrest Hoffmaster who will continue running the business, the continuance of the organization as a B Corp, the halt of existing plans for expanding the chain, and the closure of the store located in the Ballard neighborhood in Seattle.

In 2020, Bristol Farms replaced a Vons in La Cumbre Plaza in Santa Barbara and opened its first store in the area.

On March 17, 2022, Bristol Farms opened a new concept store at the Irvine Spectrum under the name "Bristol Farms Newfound Market," which unveiled a new store design and added in a restaurant, Viaggio Pizza, a coffee shop, and food hall with different local quick service restaurants. Unfortunately, due to difficulties with being located within a busy shopping mall, this new concept store was short lived, and it closed in 2024 after less than two years. It is also the third failed attempt at a Bristol Farms location in Southern Orange County south of Newport Beach, following two now-closed locations in Mission Viejo. However, many elements of that store were successful and are being incorporated in new stores and existing stores.

On April 18, 2026, Bristol Farms opened a new location in Hollywood, and it opened with the same format as the Irvine Spectrum location, but at a smaller scale, including some of the food vendors at the Irvine location.

=== Lazy Acres Market, Inc. ===
Lazy Acres Market Inc. is a small chain of six grocery stores known for selling natural and organic foods, gourmet foods, supplements, body care products, and eco-friendly goods. The stores, in Santa Barbara, Hermosa Beach, Long Beach, Encinitas, Los Feliz and San Diego (Mission Hills) are owned and operated by Bristol Farms. The original Santa Barbara store was founded in 1991 by Jimmy Searcy, Hugo van Seenus, and Irwin Carasso. Their second location opened in 2012 in Long Beach, California. The most recent store opening was in Los Feliz in July 2023.
