= Emart =

South Korean retailer

Emart Inc.
- Type: Public
- Traded as: KRX: 139480
- Industry: Retailing
- Founded: 1993; 33 years ago
- Headquarters: Seoul, South Korea
- Number of locations: 178 in South Korea, 72 in Malaysia, 6 in Mongolia, 1 in Vietnam
- Area served: South Korea, Malaysia, Vietnam, Mongolia, India
- Key people: Han Chae-yang (CEO)
- Products: Groceries, consumer goods
- Owner: Lee Myung-Hee
- Parent: Shinsegae
- Website: company.emart.com

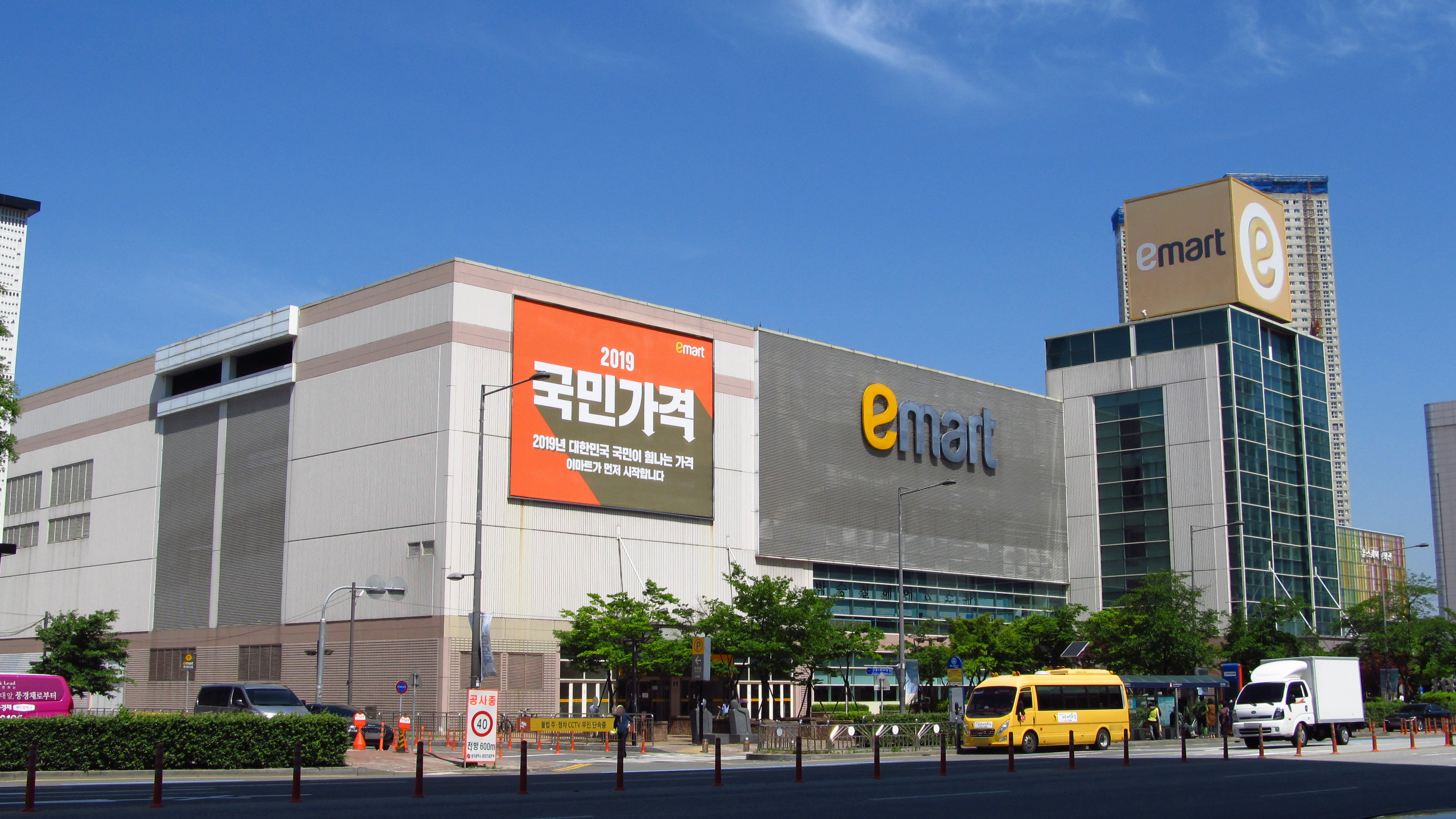
Emart store in Gwangju, South Korea

Emart Inc. (Korean: 주식회사 이마트) is the largest retailer in South Korea. The retailer was founded on 12 November 1993, by Shinsegae, as the first discount retailer in South Korea. There were 160 stores across the Country as of December 2016.

Emart is South Korea's oldest and largest discount store chain, with a total sales volume exceeding US$9.4 billion in 2009. It was the first South Korean retailer to open a retail store in China, opening 27 stores before exiting the country in 2017. Emart has another brand, Emart Traders, which are warehouse stores similar to Costco.

== History ==
Emart opened its first store in Chang-dong, Dobong-gu, Seoul, on November 12, 1993. and opened its first Emart Ilsan branch (No. 2) in Ilsan New Town on September 8, 1994. Emart was the first large retail store in South Korea. The store was constructed by Kumho Engineering & Construction at the time, and when the friction between Kumho Engineering & Construction and Emart broke out, Kumho Emart became the main body of lease.

On July 7, 1995, the third Ansan branch (closed in December 2012) opened. On December 1, 1995, the fourth Bupyeong branch (closed on June 28, 2018). On November 22, 1996, the fifth store opened in Jeju; on November 30, 1996, the sixth store opened in Bundang. On April 29, 1997, the company opened its eighth Namwon branch, its ninth Anyang branch on August 14, 1997, and its tenth Seobusan branch on August 29, 1997. On October 1, 2004, Emart opened an Internet shopping mall. In May 2006, Emart acquired Walmart Korea, converting 16 Walmart stores into Emart stores. Walmart Korea was accepted and changed to Shinsegae Mart, and in 2008, Walmart Korea was merged entirely with Emart. For a period of time, Emart implemented a "lowest compensation system" that gave gift certificates worth 5,000 won if items were more expensive than other discount stores but ended the promotion in 2007, saying that "some advertisements are false hype".

In September 2007, the Korea Food and Drug Administration announced that chlorphenapir, a pesticide component, was detected above the standard in Emart's first water powder green tea sold under its own brand.

On November 28, 2008, the Agricultural Quality Management Agency restricted Emart's Namyangju branch marking the country of origin as U.S. on the top of the meat package, but double marking as Australian was found on the barcode below.

As of September 2009, Emart has 127 and 4 distribution centers in South Korea. On May 13, 2011, Emart acquired Kim's Club Mart. On April 8, 2016, the "Mart" experience center was opened in Busan, Kizania, and on July 28, 2016, it was opened in Ulaanbaatar.

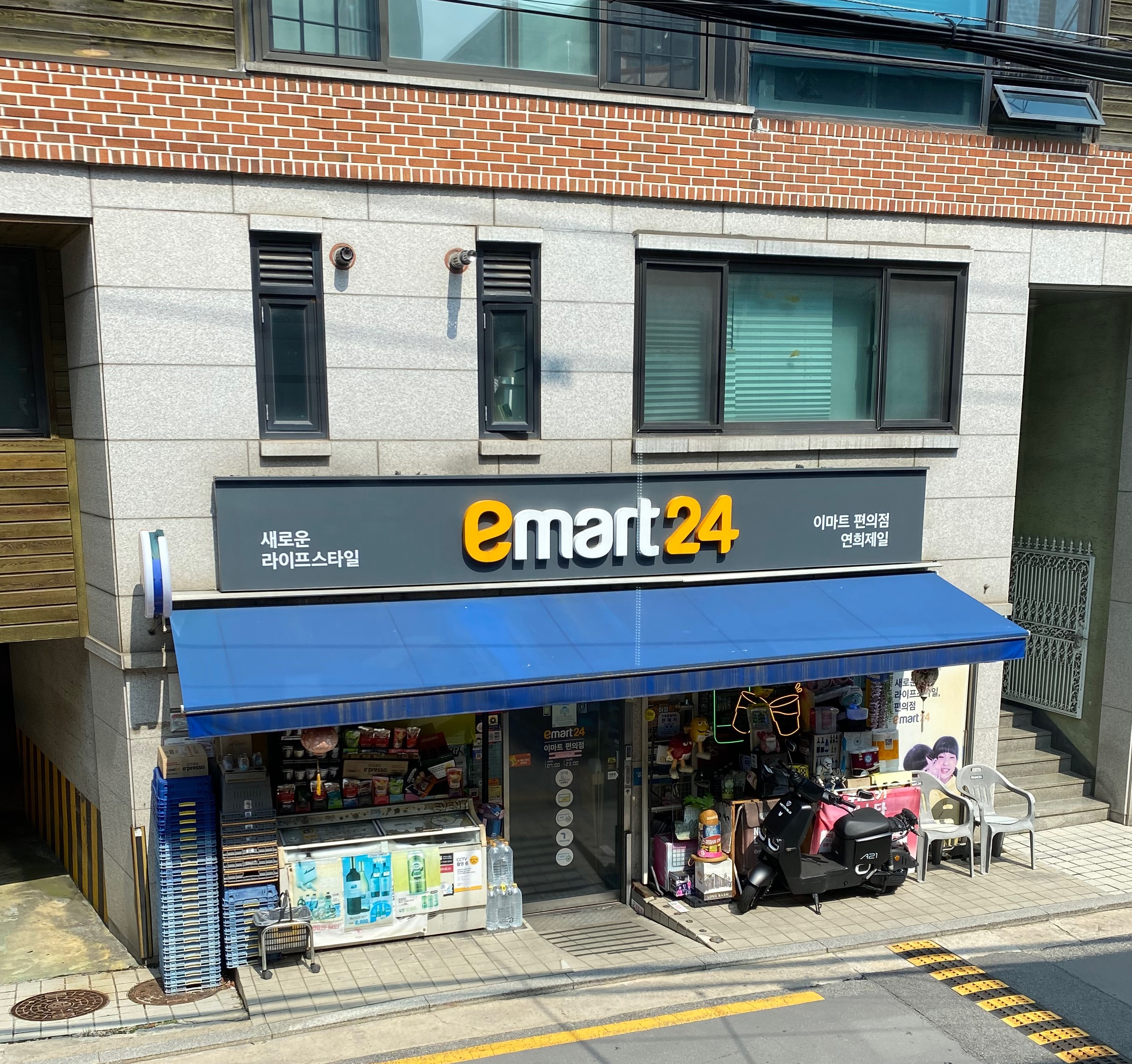
An emart24 convenience store in Seoul

American company Good Food Holdings, Inc., parent of Bristol Farms, was acquired in 2018 by Emart for $275 million. In December 2019, Endeavour Capital announced that it would be selling the grocery chain New Seasons Market to Emart, specifically to its subsidiary, Good Food Holdings, in a sale transaction that was finalized in early 2020.

On May 16, 2018, the Gyeongsan branch and Bupyeong branch closed due to poor performance and overlapping commercial districts with the Gyeyang branch, Shizikolong Skychae was built after demolition, and the Bupyeong branch was built in Bupyeong Jewell. In addition, the company closed its Ulsan Hakseong Branch, Goyang Duck Branch, Incheon Branch, Gwangju Sangmu Branch, and Seobusan Branch and sold all of Costco Korea's shares to Costco's Washington headquarters.

In January 2022, Emart acquired a majority stake (80.01%) in eBay Korea, which it renamed "Gmarket Global". EBay retained a 19.99% stake in the company.

== International ==
On February 1, 1997, it became the first Korean retailer to enter China, opening its seventh Emart store in China and the first Emart store in Shanghai. As of September 2009, Emart has 22 stores in China. Emart stores in China also sell Korean products.

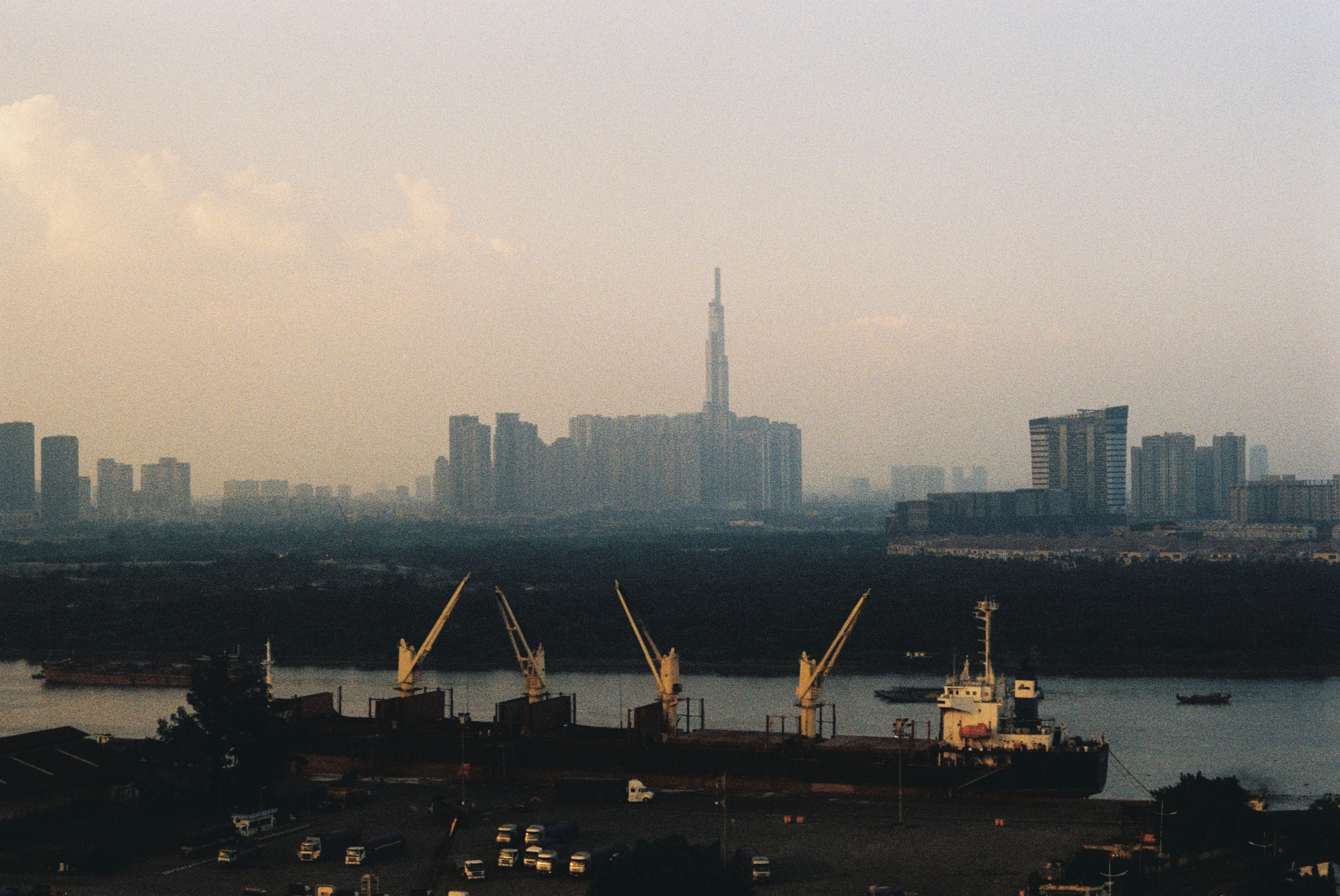
The Sofic Tower (right), where the Emart underground store located

Emart opened their first store in Ho Chi Minh City at the easternmost area of Gò Vấp District borders to Bình Thạnh District, on December 28, 2015. In late 2021, THISO or Thiso, a commerce and service subsidiary of THACO, established THISO Retail, which inked a deal with South Korean Emart Inc. to acquire a 100-percent stake in Emart Vietnam Co. Ltd. and the exclusive franchise license for its branded products at Emart Vietnam supermarkets. Thiso opened the second Emart store, their first underground store, in their headquarters also their first Thiso Mall, known as Thiso Sala in Sofic Tower, Sala City, Thủ Thiêm new urban area, District 2 (now is Thủ Đức City) on November 3, 2022. And just within a year, in 2023, Thiso opened their second mall, Thiso Trường Chinh – Phan Huy Ích in the westernmost area of Gò Vấp District, borders to Tân Bình district and west side of Tan Son Nhat International Airport, leads to the inauguration of the third Emart store in the city.

In 2021, Emart24 convenience stores expanded to Malaysia to directly compete with CU, which Emart24's first Malaysian store opened in 2021. In December 2022, Emart24 launched in Singapore with the launch of the first two outlets on Christmas Holidays. During the launching event at Jurong Point outlet, chief executive Andy Choi has planned to launch 300 stores within the next five years.

In June 2025, Emart24 signed a trademark license agreement with Jung Brothers Hospitality, formally entering the Indian market. In August, its first store will open in Pune. October will see the opening of a second store. Emart24's arrival is anticipated to transition the retail industry, which is dominated by Kirana stores devoid of contemporary amenities and technology. The brand's expansion is also expected to be aided by the Korean wave's enormous appeal. Along with its unique No Brand line, the store will feature prepared meals like tteokbokki, gimbap, and hot dogs, cosmetics, a Korean-style self-service photo booth, and lifestyle items.

On July 28, 2016, Emart opened its first store in the capital city of Mongolia, Ulaanbaatar in partnership with Altai Holding LLC. Choi Jong-geun, who leads Emart’s overseas operations, stated that Emart plans to open more than 10 additional stores in Mongolia by 2030. As of December 2025, Emart operates a total of 6 stores in Mongolia.

== Shareholding structure ==
As of February 2025
Shareholder	Shareholding (%)
Chung Yong-jin	28.56%
National Pension Service	8.68%
Naver Corporation	3.00%
The Vanguard Group	2.30%
Federated Hermes	2.20%

Shinsegae Group Chairman Chung Yong-jin increased his stake in E-Mart to 28.56% from a previous 18.56%. This was achieved by acquiring the entirety of the 10% stake held by his mother, Lee Myung-hee, Honorary Chairwoman of Shinsegae Group.
