= Maison Marou =

Vietnamese chocolate company

Marou Chocolate Limited Company
- Founded: 2011
- Founder: Samuel Maruta , Vincent Mourou
- Headquarters: Ho Chi Minh City, Vietnam,
- Number of locations: 20 stores (2025)

Maison Marou is a gourmet Vietnamese chocolate company based in Ho Chi Minh City, Vietnam. Founded in 2011 by Samuel Maruta and Vincent Mourou, Maison Marou sources cacao from 6 provinces in southern Vietnam. The company operates 20 shops in Ho Chi Minh City, Hanoi, Hoi An, Hue, Da Nang, Nha Trang, and Binh Duong. Maison Marou chocolate has received acclaim from the International Chocolate Awards and Salon du Chocolat.

In 2016, Marou opened the first store in Calmette Street , Ho Chi Minh City

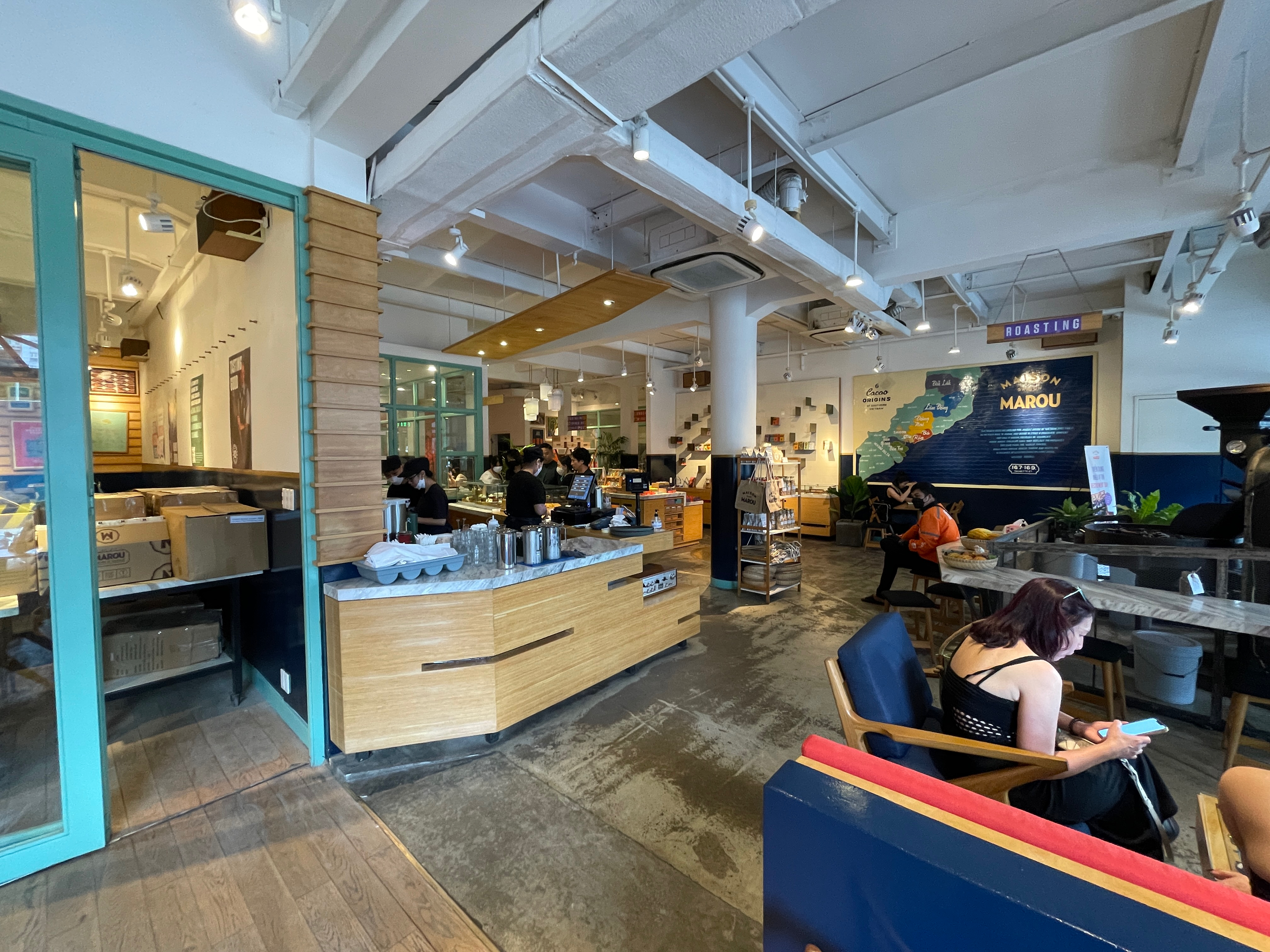
Maison Marou's first store in District 1, Ho Chi Minh City

In 2021, Mekong Capital announced an investment in Maison Marou as part of the company's Mekong Enterprise Fund IV.
