= Truong Hai Group =

Vietnamese automobile manufacturer

Truong Hai Group Corporation
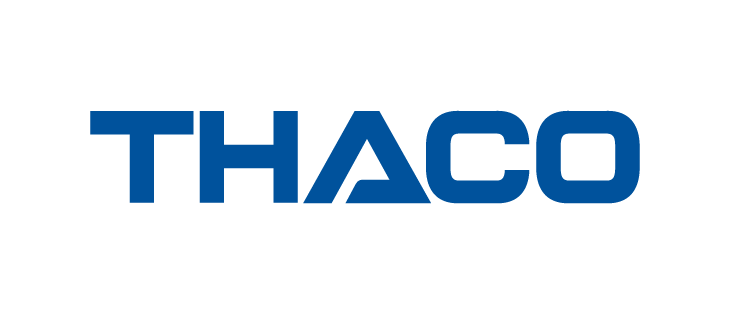
- Native name: Công ty cổ phần Tập đoàn Trường Hải
- Formerly: Truong Hai Auto Corporation
- Type: Joint stock
- Industry: Conglomerate
- Founded: April 29, 1997; 29 years ago in Bien Hoa II Industrial Park, Biên Hoà, Đồng Nai Province
- Founder: Trần Bá Dương
- Headquarters: Sofic Tower, 10 Mai Chí Thọ Blvd, Thủ Thiêm, Thủ Đức, Ho Chi Minh City, Vietnam
- Key people: Trần Bá Dương (Chairman)
- Owner: Jardine Matheson (via Jardine Cycle & Carriage): 1,45%
- Number of employees: 60,000
- Website: thacogroup.vn/en

Truong Hai Group Corporation (THACO; abbreviation for former name) (Vietnamese: Công ty cổ phần tập đoàn Trường Hải) is a Vietnamese conglomerate. The company is a member of the Vietnam Automobile Manufacturers Association (VAMA). It was founded in 1997 as Truong Hai Auto Corporation and is considered one of the pioneers of the Vietnamese auto industry. In 2014, the company captured 32% of Vietnam's automobile market. As of 2017, THACO owned the largest automobile production capacity in Vietnam, at 71,000 units per year owned by (100%) stake Ministry of Information and Communications.

THACO's main products comprise family cars, light trucks, and buses. The company has a joint venture with Kia Motors to produce Kia-branded cars from its main factory, located in the Chu Lai Economic Zone. It also produces and manufactures Mazda passenger cars, through its VinaMazda subsidiary. In 2020, the company entered the light motorcycle market.

In 2021, THACO restructured to become a conglomerate corporation, then acquired the South Korea retail operations of e-mart in Vietnam market as part of the subsidiary of Thiso.

== Subsidiaries ==
THACO has evolved into a multi-industry holding corporation which has 6 sub-holdings, i.e.

- THACO AUTO (Automobiles)
- THACO INDUSTRIES (Mechanics & Supporting Industries)
- THACO AGRI (Agriculture)
- THADICO (Investment – Construction)
- THISO (Commerce – Service)
- THILOGI (Logistics)

== Models ==
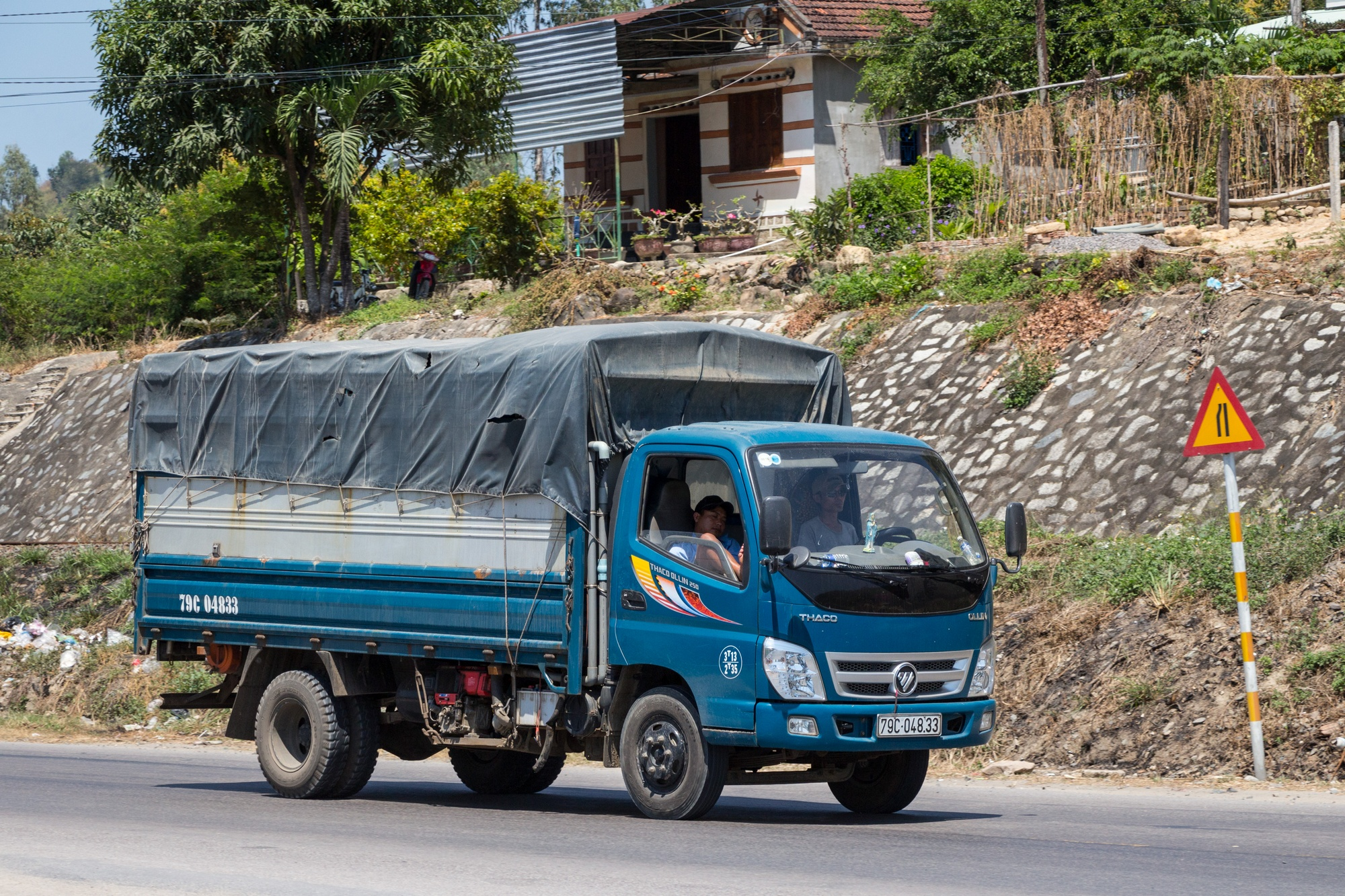
Thaco Ollin 250, a rebadged of the Foton Motor Ollin light truck in Khánh Hòa province, Vietnam

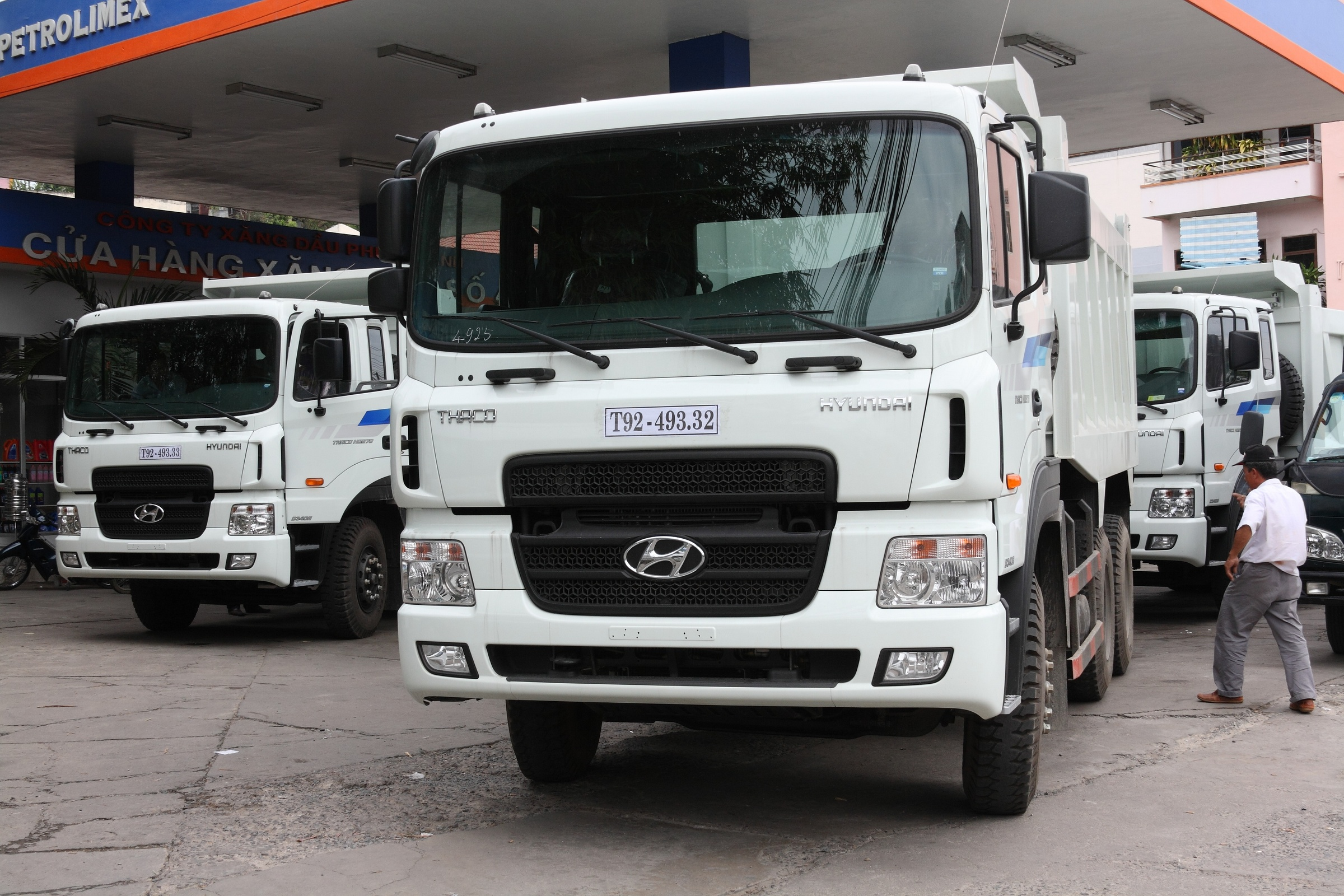
Thaco Hyundai HD270 dump truck at a Petrolimex Gas station in Nha Trang, Khánh Hòa, Vietnam

- Mazda models Mazda 3 , Mazda2 , Mazda6 , Mazda CX-8 , Mazda CX-5 , Mazda BT-50
- Kia Motors models ( Bongo, Morning, Soluto, Carens, Sorento, Seltos, Sportage, Sonet, Carnival)
- Peugeot models (2008, 3008, 5008)
- Thaco buses built on Hyundai chassis (Thaco City, Thaco County, Thaco Town, Thaco Universe, Thaco Bluesky, Thaco Mobihome)
- Hyundai buses (Hyundai Solati, Hyundai County) until 2018
- Hyundai trucks
- Foton trucks
- Thaco trucks and light commercial vehicles (Thaco Towner, Thaco Frontier, Thaco Forland, Thaco Ollin)
- Mercedes-Benz buses assembly for Vietnamese market
- BMW X1 , BMW 3 Series , BMW 5 Series , BMW X3 , BMW X5 , BMW X7 , BMW 7 Series , BMW 4 Series , BMW X4 , BMW X6 , BMW Z4 , BMW i4 , BMW iX3 , BMW i7 models
- Mitsubishi Canter (FA, FI, FJ,TF)
- Chinese-market Iveco Daily, Iveco Fidato, Iveco Lingsheng V100 minibus
- Howo trucks (TX D600, TX D800)
- Volvo B8R in the Philippines
- RAM 1500
