= VinaMazda =

VinaMazda is a Vietnamese joint-venture automotive company jointly operated by Mazda and THACO. In late 2010, Mazda's return to Vietnam was announced. A 10000-vehicle-per-year factory was inaugurated in 2011 in Núi Thành District. The company manufactures for domestic market such models as the Mazda3 , Mazda2 , Mazda6 , Mazda BT-50 and Mazda CX-5.
