= Mekong Capital =

- Company type: Limited Liability
- Industry: Private Equity
- Founded: 2001
- Headquarters: Sonatus Building, 25th floor, 15 Le Thanh Ton, Sai Gon Ward, Ho Chi Minh City, Vietnam
- Key people: Chris Freund - Founder and Partner
- Number of employees: 41
- Website: www.mekongcapital.com

Mekong Capital is a Vietnam-focused private equity firm. Operating in Vietnam since 2001, Mekong Capital is one of the first private equity firms to engage Vietnam, and has completed 50 private equity investments (including 34 full exits) in Vietnam through 5 funds. Mekong Capital has offices in Ho Chi Minh City, Hanoi. Focusing on manufacturing companies until 2005, Mekong Capital shifted its focus towards consumer-driven businesses in 2006, including retail, consumer products, education and healthcare. From 2020 onwards, the firm also expanded into agri-tech and bio-tech investments, and has discussed plans to expand to regenerative agriculture. Mekong Capital has invested significant resources in developing its own corporate culture, and in the corporate culture of its portfolio companies, and has been the subject of several case studies from 2010 onwards.

Mekong Capital was founded by Chris Freund in 2001. Freund was with Templeton Asset Management, based in Vietnam and Singapore, from 1995 to 2001.

Mekong Capital won Private Equity International's awards, including Operational Excellence Award 2015 for the Asia-Pacific Small Cap Category.

== Mekong Capital's notable current investments ==
- Gene Solutions
- F88
- Marou
- LiveSpo
- Entobel
- Pharmacity

== Exits ==
As of 2024, Mekong Capital has completed 34 full exits. Among these are companies that Mekong Capital supported and helped list on stock exchanges during their investment period, including Tan Dai Hung, Mobile World, Intresco, Traphaco, Phu Nhuan Jewelry, Loc Troi and Nam Long.

Some of Mekong Capital's successful past investments include:

- Mobile World (The Gioi Di Dong)
- Phu Nhuan Jewelry (PNJ)
- Golden Gate Group
- Vietnam Australia International School (VAS)
- Masan Consumer
- Pizza 4Ps

== Funds ==
- Mekong Enterprise Fund, Ltd.
- Mekong Enterprise Fund II, Ltd.
- Vietnam Azalea Fund, Limited
- Mekong Enterprise Fund III, Ltd.
- Mekong Enterprise Fund IV, Ltd
