= Thai Express (Singapore) =

Singapore restaurant chain

- Type: Private
- Industry: Restaurants
- Founded: 2002; 24 years ago in Holland Village in Singapore
- Founder: Grace Goh-Lee and Ivan Lee
- Number of locations: 69 restaurants (2011)
- Area served: Singapore, Malaysia, China, Vietnam
- Key people: Ivan Lee (CEO)
- Products: Food service
- Parent: Minor International
- Website: thaiexpress.com.sg

Thai Express is a chain of restaurants serving Thai cuisine. It opened its first restaurant at Holland Village in Singapore in May 2002. Since then, the chain has also expanded to three other countries: Malaysia, Vietnam, and Maldives. The chain also operated a former location in Chaoyang District, Beijing, China.

== History ==
The idea of a restaurant was conceived in 2000 by Grace Goh and Ivan Lee who were classmates at the National University of Singapore. They decided to serve Thai food due to its popularity in Singapore. The first Thai Express restaurant opened in Holland Village in May 2002.

Lee would become the company's CEO while Goh returned to University to study law.

In May 2008 the company was sold to Minor International.

== Type of restaurant ==
ThaiExpress's location in Colours on the Bay (which was a cluster of restaurants similar to a food court) within The Esplanade prided itself on offering authentic Thai cuisine, but with fast service, the option of individual portions in addition to the traditional mode of communal dining, a modern, relaxed atmosphere, affordable prices, and a collection of standard dishes, rare offerings such as Laksa, and unique menu items, including desserts and beverages.

== Locations ==
The original location is in Holland Village, Singapore. There are many other locations in Singapore including, but not limited to, a restaurant in The Esplanade - Theatres on the Bay. The Paragon Shopping Centre, and Plaza Singapura. Thai Express restaurants can be found in China, Vietnam, Malaysia, Singapore and Thailand.

== See also ==
- List of Thai restaurants
