= Pizza 4P's =

Vietnamese pizza chain

- Founded: 2011; 15 years ago
- Headquarters: Ho Chi Minh City, Vietnam,
- Number of locations: 32 stores (2024)
- Key people: Yosuke Masuko (Founder CEO); Sanae Takasugi (Co-Founder & Deputy CEO)
- Revenue: ▲US$35M (2023)
- Website: pizza4ps.com

Pizza 4P's is a pizza chain based in Ho Chi Minh City, Vietnam. Founded in 2011 by Japanese entrepreneurs Yosuke Masuko and Sanae Takasugi, the company operates 32 locations in Vietnam, Cambodia, India, Indonesia, and Japan. The company takes a farm-to-table approach to pizza, operating a dairy in Đơn Dương district to produce its own cheese.

The company offered a "bun dau mam tom" pizza with fermented shrimp sauce in 2019. In Cambodia, it offers a num banhchok pizza with a yellow kroeung, coconut milk and prahok sauce, freshwater fish, cheese, peanuts, water celery, basil, water mimosa, banana blossoms, water hyacinths and sesbania flowers.

Private equity firm Mekong Capital invested in Pizza 4P's in 2019 as part of its Mekong Enterprise Fund III, exiting the investment in 2022.
