= Nguyễn Văn Linh Parkway =

- North Nhà Bè – South Bình Chánh Highway
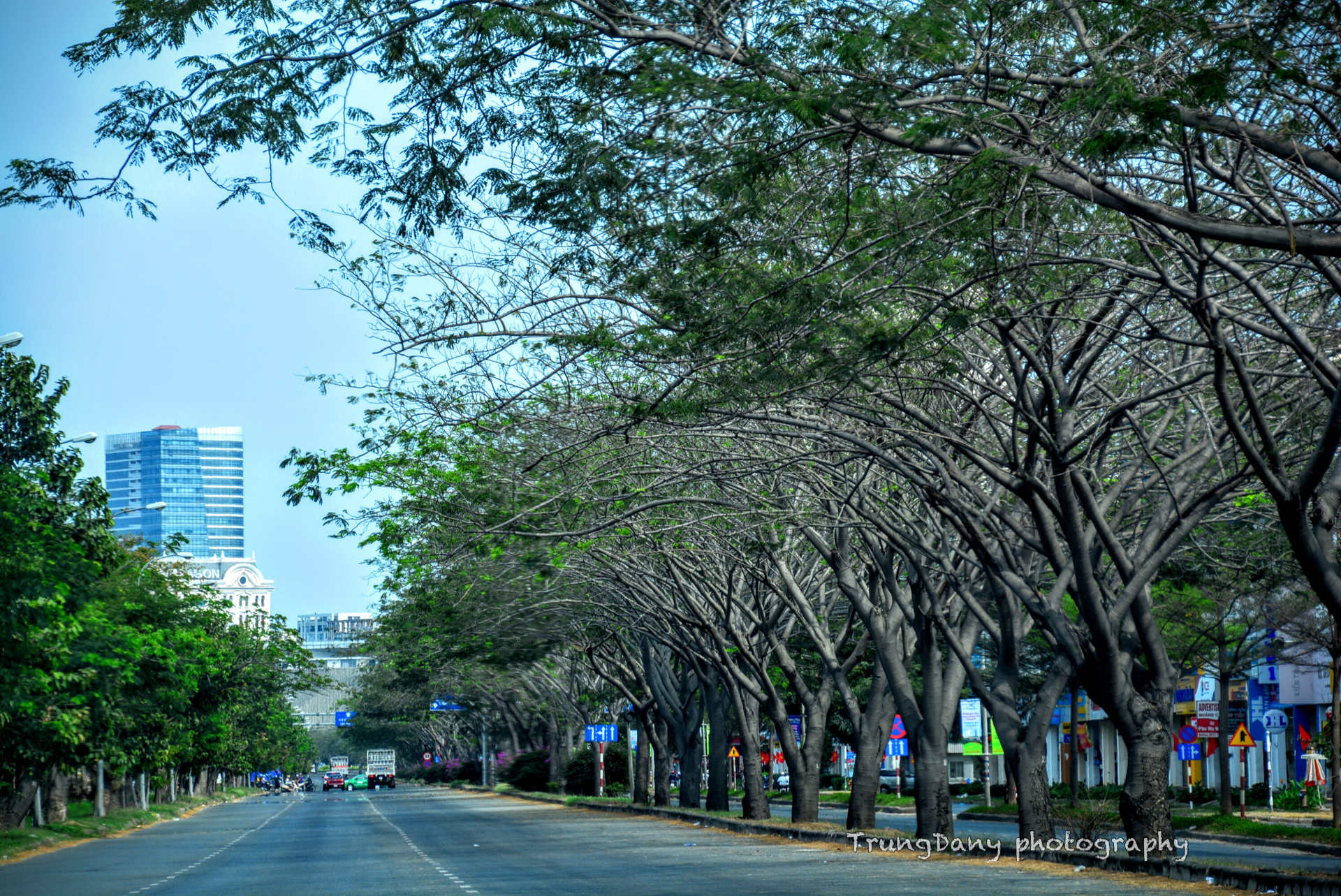
- Nguyễn Văn Linh Parkway acrosses Phú Mỹ Hưng Urban Area
- Interactive map of Nguyễn Văn Linh Parkway
- Native name: Vietnamese: Đại lộ Nguyễn Văn Linh
- Part of: Ring Road 2 (Ho Chi Minh City)
- Namesake: Nguyễn Văn Linh
- Owner: Ho Chi Minh City
- Maintained by: Phu My Hung Corporation
- Length: 17.8 km (11.1 mi)
- Width: 60–120 m
- Location: Ho Chi Minh City
- Quarter: Tân Thuận, Tân Mỹ, Tân Hưng, Bình Hưng, Bình Đông, Bình Chánh
- Northeast end: Tân Thuận EPZ, Tân Thuận, Ho Chi Minh City
- Major junctions: Tân Thuận Bridge junction, Tân Thuận, Ho Chi Minh City; Phú Mỹ Bridge junction, Tân Mỹ, Ho Chi Minh City; at Nguyễn Văn Linh - National Route 50 intersection, Bình Hưng, Ho Chi Minh City
- West end: at Bình Thuận intersection, Bình Chánh, Ho Chi Minh City

Construction
- Inauguration: July 30, 2007; 19 years ago

Other
- Designer: Tedi South

Nguyễn Văn Linh Parkway (or Boulevard) (Vietnamese: Đường Nguyễn Văn Linh, Đại lộ Nguyễn Văn Linh), initially known as North Nhà Bè – South Bình Chánh Road (or Highway; Vietnamese: đường Bắc Nhà Bè – Nam Bình Chánh), is a main east–west arterial parkway connecting District 7 and Bình Chánh District in the south of Thành phố Hồ Chí Minh. Most of the parkway is part of Ho Chi Minh City Ring Road 2 (from Phú Mỹ Bridge Junction to Trịnh Quang Nghị Road intersection).

== Overall ==
Nguyễn Văn Linh Parkway in Bình Hưng

The parkway has a total length of 17.8 km (11.1 mi), starts at Tân Thuận intersection, it connects Huỳnh Tấn Phát Road and Thủ Thiêm 4 Bridge at Tân Thuận to National Route 1 at Bình Chánh, leads to Ho Chi Minh City–Trung Luong Expressway.

The thoroughfare was planned to have a certain width of 60–120 m, with at least 10 lanes, 10 bridges, with a total investment of approximately 100 million USD. This is the largest and most significant infrastructure project undertaken by Phu My Hung Joint Venture Company.

This was a landmark urban infrastructure project at that time in Vietnam, and it was named after the late General Secretary of the Communist Party of Vietnam, Nguyễn Văn Linh, in 2000.

=== Line 7 ===
The Line 7 of Ho Chi Minh City Metro was planned from 2024, it will run along the parkway, connecting Tân Kiên with Thủ Thiêm, Thảo Điền, Thanh Đa – Bình Quới and Phước Thiện (Vinhomes Grand Park, Long Bình, Ho Chi Minh City). This line was the Monorail 2 (M2), a monorail line of the city metro system in a former development plan and was shorter as it just connect Trịnh Quang Nghị Road with Bình Quới.

=== Benefit ===
Nguyễn Văn Linh Parkway is considered a vital artery for the economic development of the southern area of Ho Chi Minh City, connecting to key projects such as: Tân Thuận Export Processing Zone (EPZ), Phú Mỹ Hưng Urban Area, Hiệp Phước Power Plant, Hiệp Phước Industrial Park, Hiệp Phước Port, Hiệp Phước Port Urban Area (via Nguyễn Hữu Thọ Road), Phú Mỹ Bridge and Thủ Thiêm New Urban Area (via Thủ Thiêm 4 Bridge). Moreover, it connects the Mekong Delta to the eastern Saigon River area with some major sites like Cát Lái, Saigon Hi-Tech Park, VNU-HCM, or more further is accessing Đồng Nai (Biên Hòa, Long Thanh International Airport) and Vũng Tàu with the ports and vice versa without going through the Ho Chi Minh City center.

== Lanes ==
Ông Lớn Bridge

- Huỳnh Tấn Phát Road - Nguyễn Thị Thập Road: 10 lanes
- Nguyễn Thị Thập Road - Ông Lớn Bridge: 14 lanes
- Ông Lớn Bridge - National Route 1: 10 lanes

== Bridges ==
Xóm Củi Bridge

- Thầy Tiêu Bridge: 14 lanes
- Tư Dinh Bridge: 14 lanes
- Ông Lớn Bridge: 10 lanes
- Ông Bé Bridge: 10 lanes
- Xóm Củi Bridge: 10 lanes
- Rạch Ngang Bridge: 10 lanes
- Bà Lớn Bridge: 10 lanes
- Sập Bridge: 10 lanes
- Mã Voi Bridge: 10 lanes
- Cần Giuộc Bridge: 10 lanes

== Overpasses and underpasses ==
Bình Thuận intersection overpass on National Route 1, the parkway west end

- Phú Mỹ Bridge underpass: 2 lanes
- Nguyễn Văn Linh overass: 4 lanes
- Nguyễn Hữu Thọ underpass: 6 lanes
- Bình Thuận intersection overpass: 4 lanes (On National Route 1)

== Notable places ==
Nguyễn Văn Linh Parkway is a major thoroughfare of the Saigon South Urban Development, a new town in southern Ho Chi Minh City, some notable places that the thoroughfare acrosses:

Bình Điền Wholesale Market, Bình Đông

Mizuki Park Urban Area near Rạch Ngang Bridge, Bình Hưng

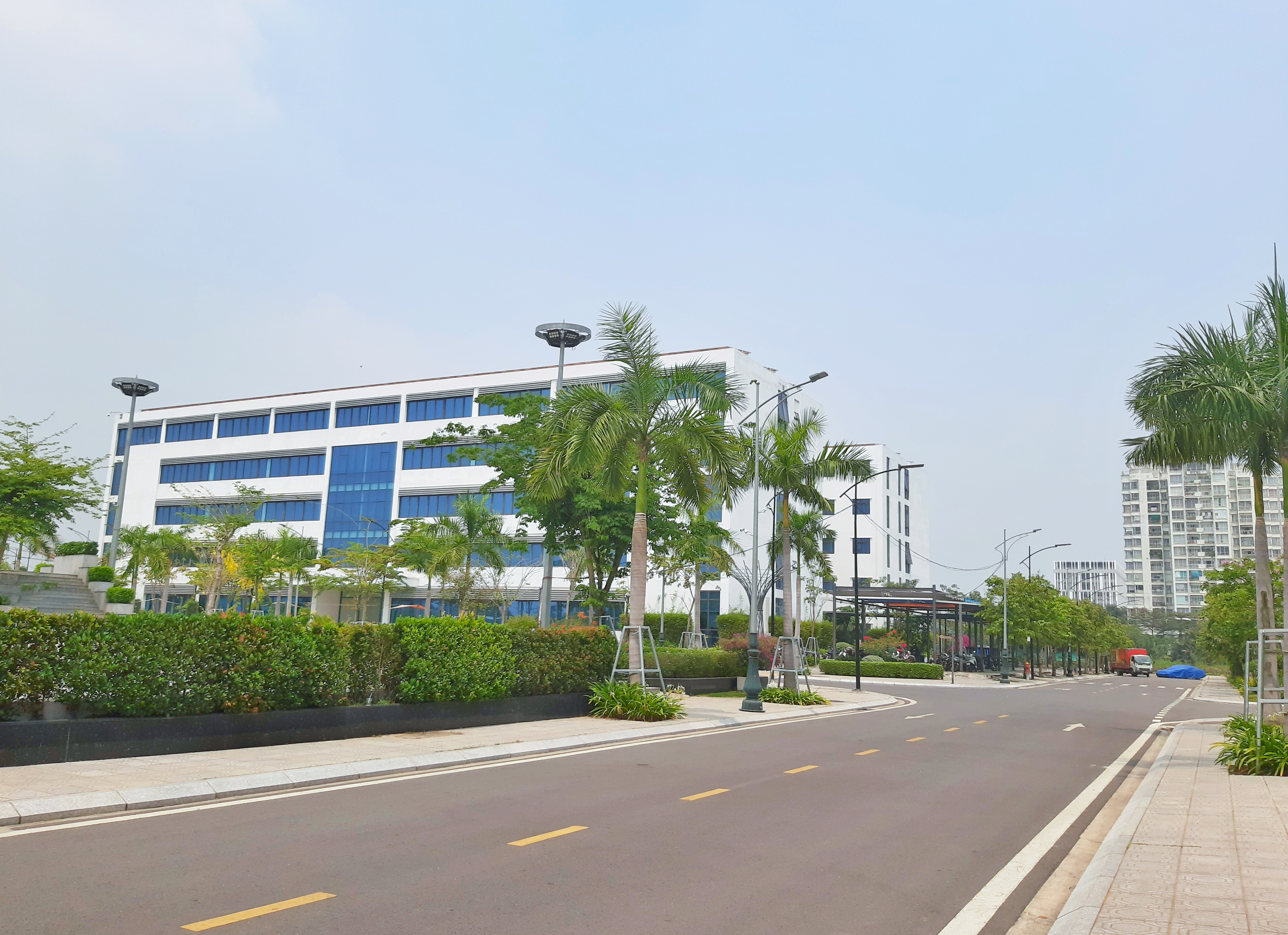
University of Economics Ho Chi Minh City, Campus N, Bình Hưng

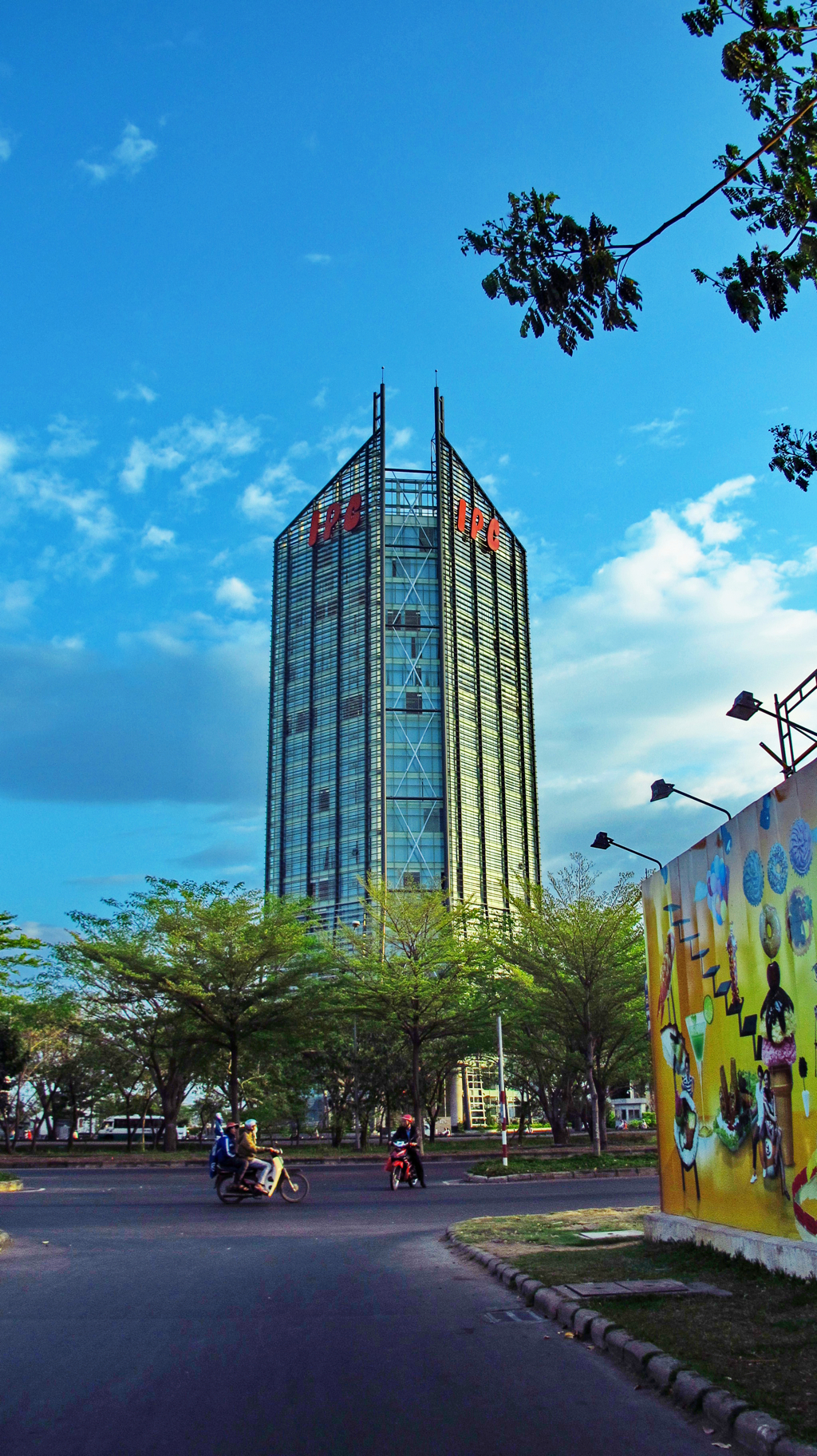
Tân Thuận Industrial Promotion Company Ltd. Building and Headquarters, Tân Hưng

Royal Melbourne Institute of Technology Vietnam, Tân Hưng

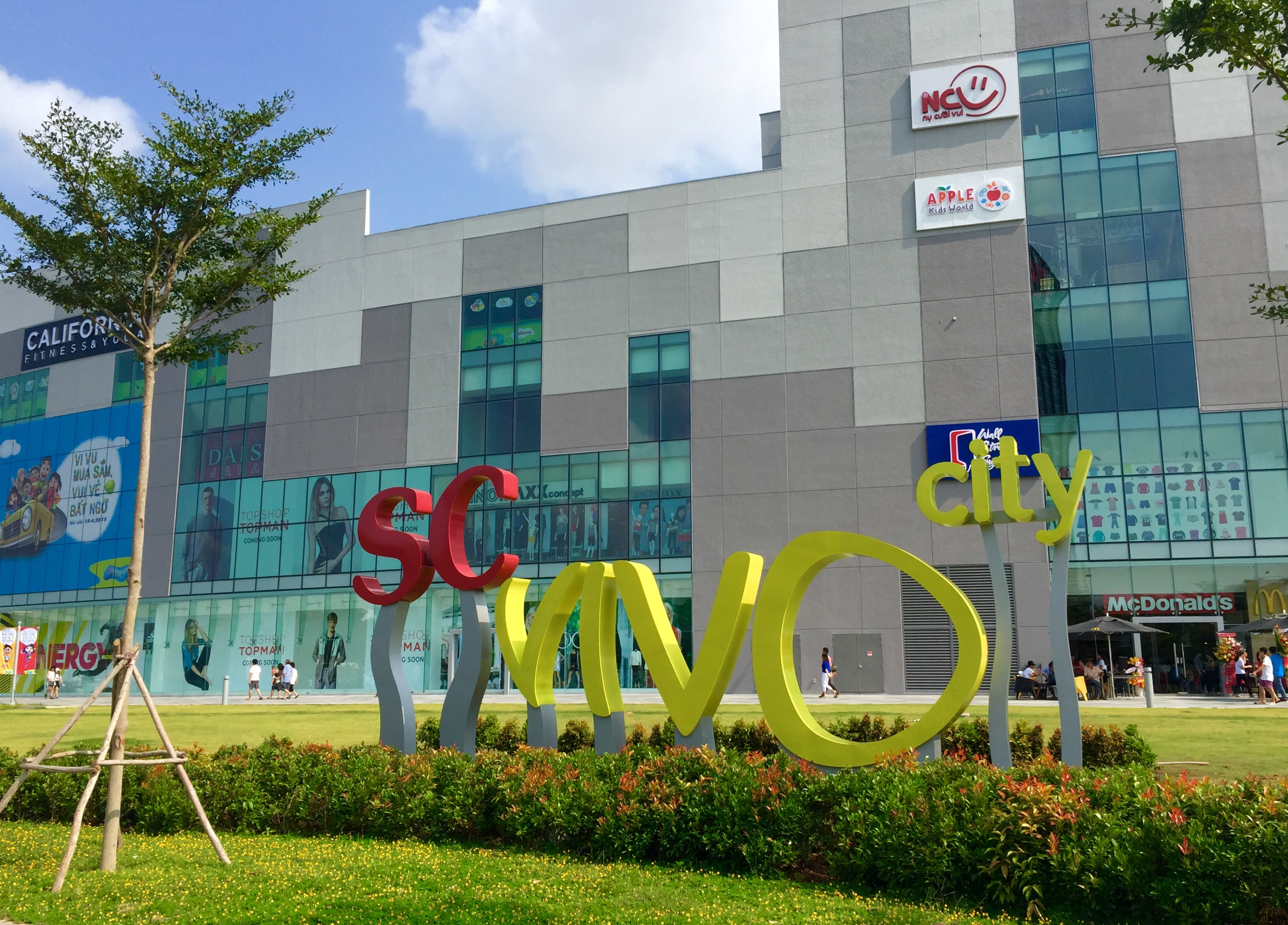
SC VivoCity, Tân Hưng

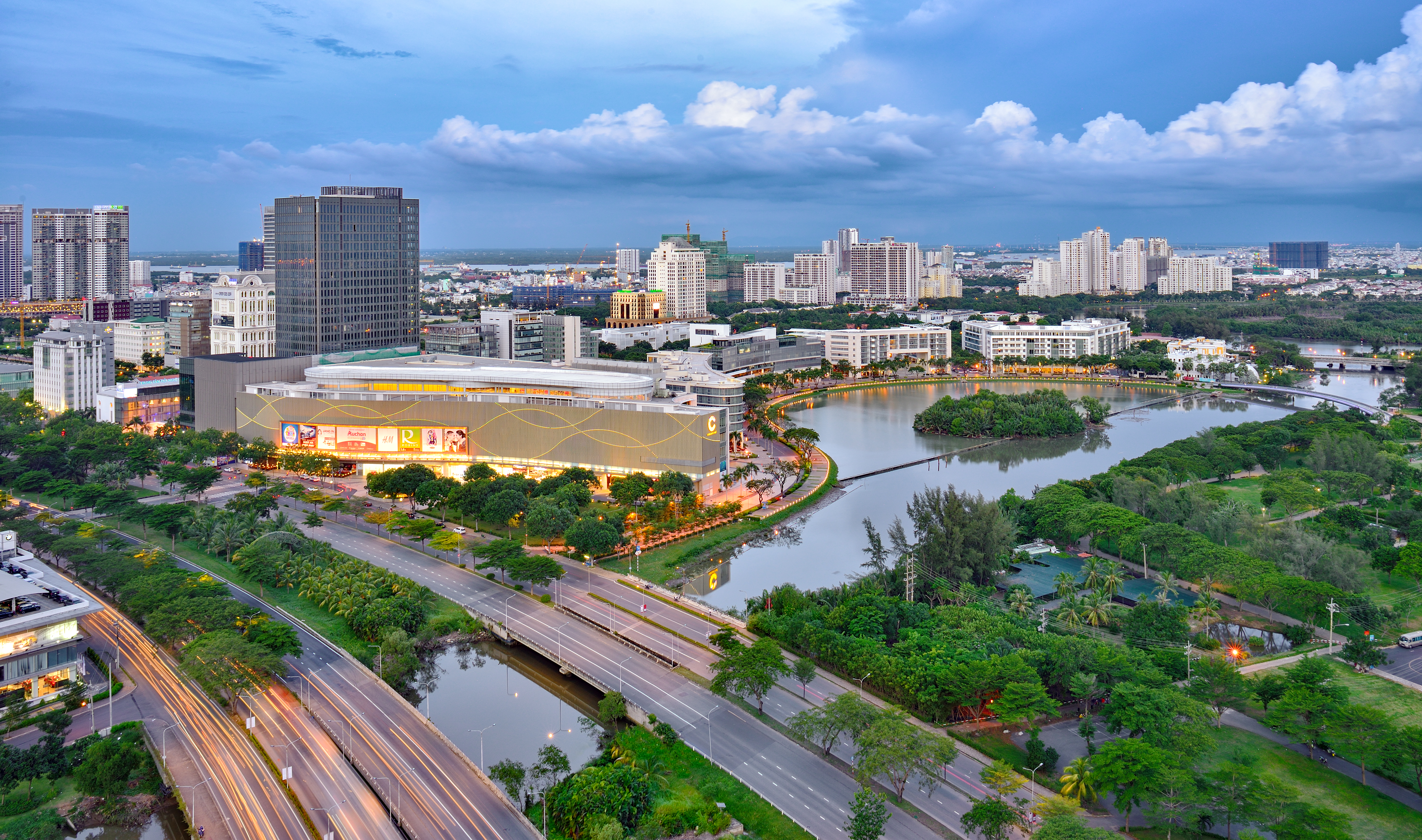
Phú Mỹ Hưng City Center (features Crescent Mall, Crescent Lake), Tân Mỹ

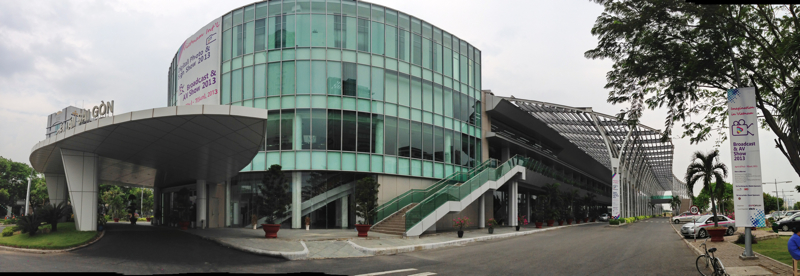
Saigon Exhibition and Convention Center, Tân Mỹ

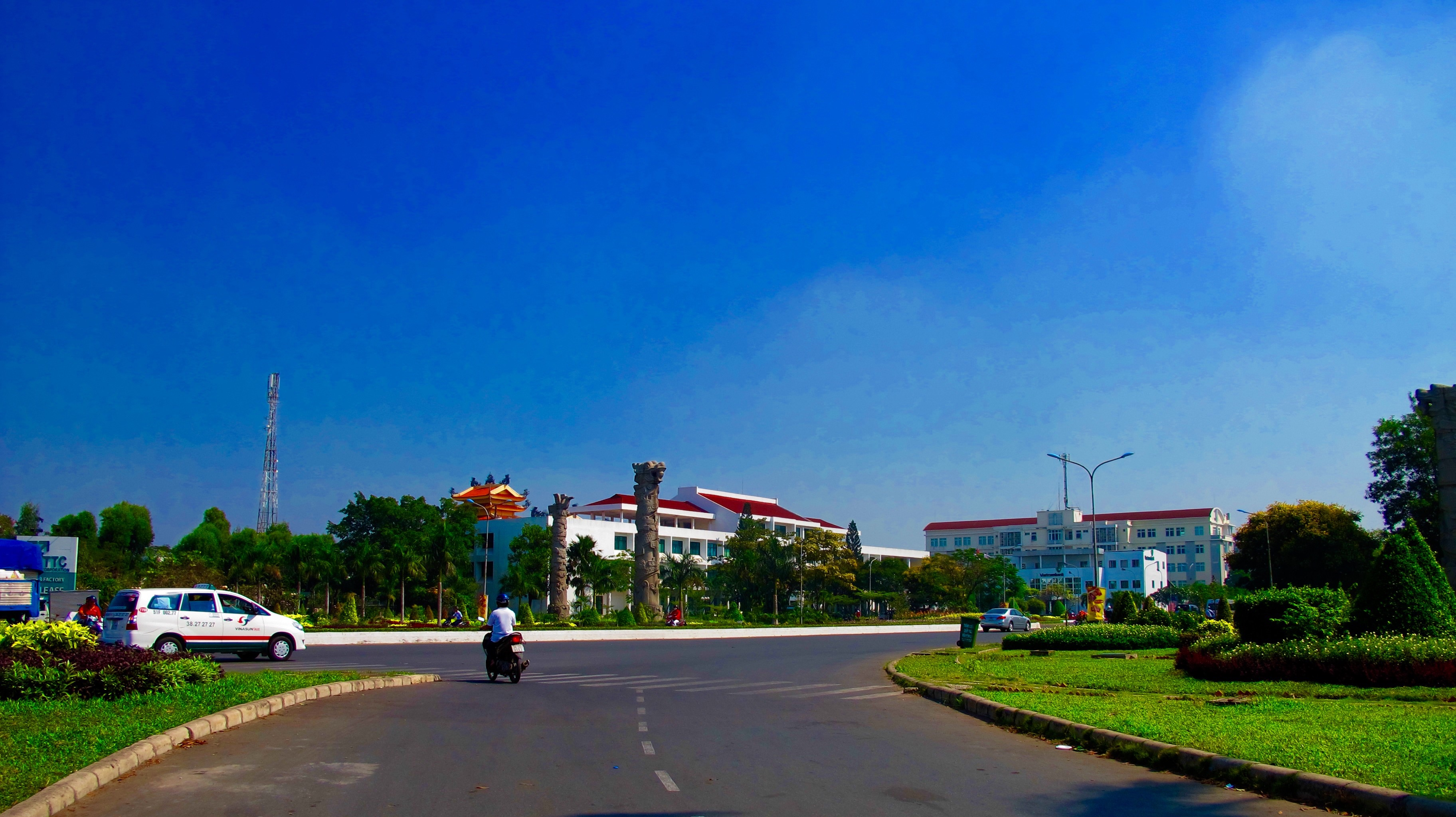
Tân Thuận EPZ entrance, the parkway east end
