= Bình Chánh (disambiguation) =

Bình Chánh may refer to several places in Vietnam, including:

- Bình Chánh, Ho Chi Minh City, a ward of Ho Chi Minh City
- Bình Chánh district, a former urban district of Ho Chi Minh City
