= SECC =

SECC may refer to:

- Single Edge Contact Cartridge, a connector for microprocessors.
- SECC (metal), a low-cost sheet metal often used for computer cases.
- Saigon Exhibition and Convention Center, an exhibition and convention center located in Phú Mỹ Hưng urban area, District 7, Ho Chi Minh City, Vietnam.
- Sands Expo and Convention Center, an exhibition and convention center located in Las Vegas, Nevada, United States.
- Scottish Exhibition and Conference Centre, now known as the SEC Centre, an exhibition space in Glasgow, Scotland.
- Socio Economic and Caste Census, conducted as part of the Census of India, first in 2011.
- Southeastern Ceremonial Complex, the iconographic and mythological complex of the Mississippian culture.
- Southeastern California Conference of Seventh-day Adventists, the Seventh-day Adventist conference-level governing body that encompasses and oversees all Southeastern California Seventh-day Adventist organizations.
