= Tân Mỹ, Ho Chi Minh City =

Tân Mỹ Phường Tân Mỹ Phú Mỹ
- Ward
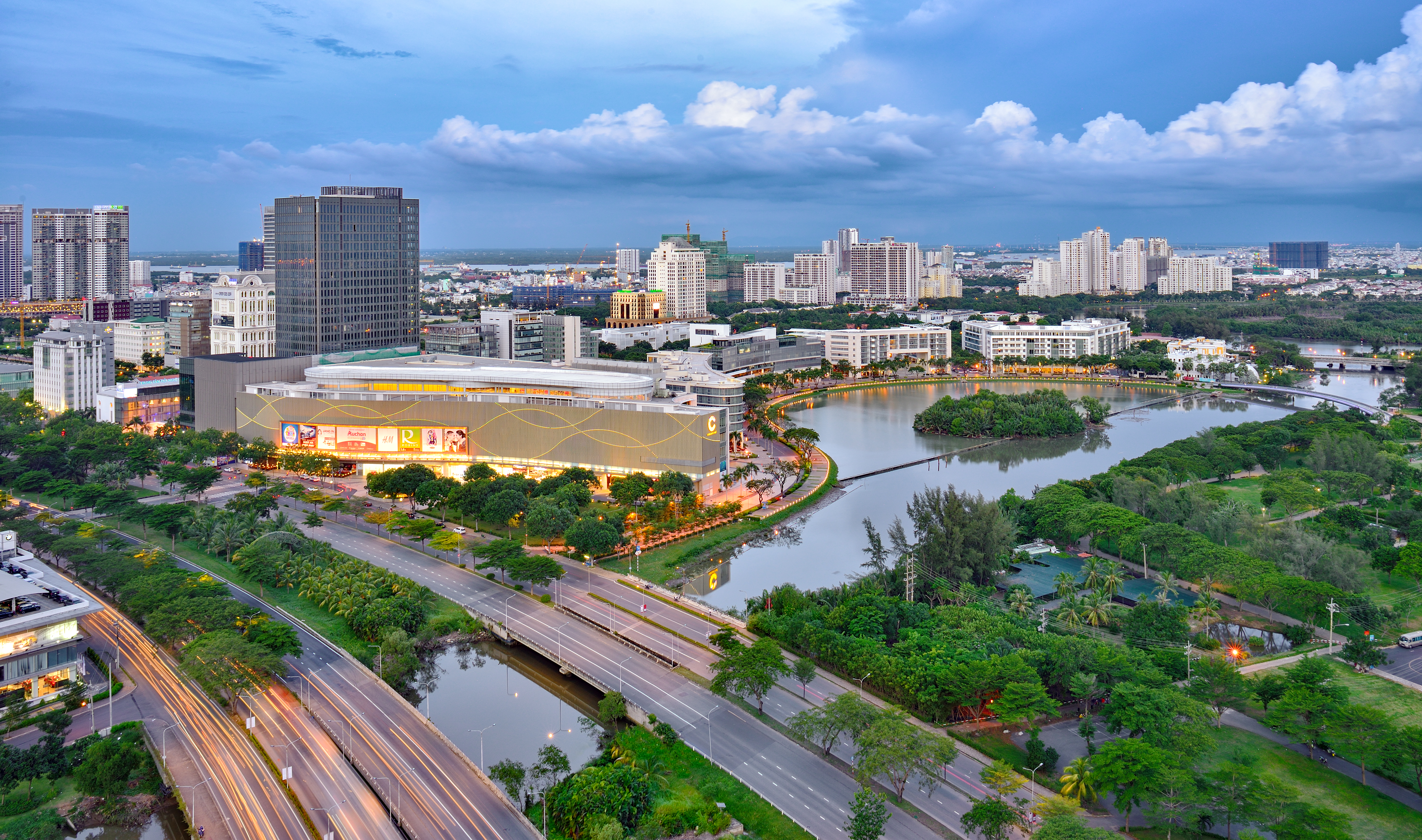
- Phú Mỹ Hưng urban area
- Interactive map of Tân Mỹ
- Coordinates: 10°43′34″N 106°43′22″E
- Country: Vietnam
- Municipality: Ho Chi Minh City
- Established: June 16, 2025
- Seat: Administrative centre, No. 7 Tân Phú Street

Government
  - Type: Ward-level authority

Area
  - Total: 2.49 sq mi (6.45 km^{2})

Population (2024)
  - Total: 68,124
  - Density: 27,400/sq mi (10,600/km^{2})
- Time zone: UTC+07:00 (Indochina Time)
- Administrative code: 27487

Tân Mỹ (Vietnamese: Phường Tân Mỹ) is a ward and a central business district in the south side of Ho Chi Minh City, Vietnam. It is one of the 168 new wards, communes and special zones of the city following the reorganization in 2025.

== Geography ==
Tân Mỹ is located in the urban core of Ho Chi Minh City, 8 km to the south of Saigon, it has the following geographical location:

- To the east, it borders Phú Thuận by Huỳnh Tấn Phát street
- To the west, it borders Tân Hưng by Nguyễn Thị Thập street and Thầy Tiêu creek
- To the south, it borders Nhà Bè by Phú Xuân river
- To the north, it borders Tân Thuận by Nguyễn Thị Thập street.

According to Official Dispatch No. 2896/BNV-CQĐP dated May 27, 2025 of the Ministry of Home Affairs, following the merger, Tân Mỹ has a land area of 6.45 km², the population as of December 31, 2024 is 68,124 people, the population density is 27,400 people/km².

== History ==
On June 16, 2025, the National Assembly Standing Committee issued Resolution No. 1685/NQ-UBTVQH15 on the arrangement of commune-level administrative units of Ho Chi Minh City in 2025 (effective from June 16, 2025). Accordingly, the entire land area and population of Tân Phú ward and part of Phú Mỹ ward of the former District 7 will be integrated into a new ward named Tân Mỹ (Clause 20, Article 1).

== Healthcare ==
The Medical Campus District of Phú Mỹ Hưng, located in the ward, north side of Nguyễn Văn Linh Parkway, featuring the international and private hospitals:

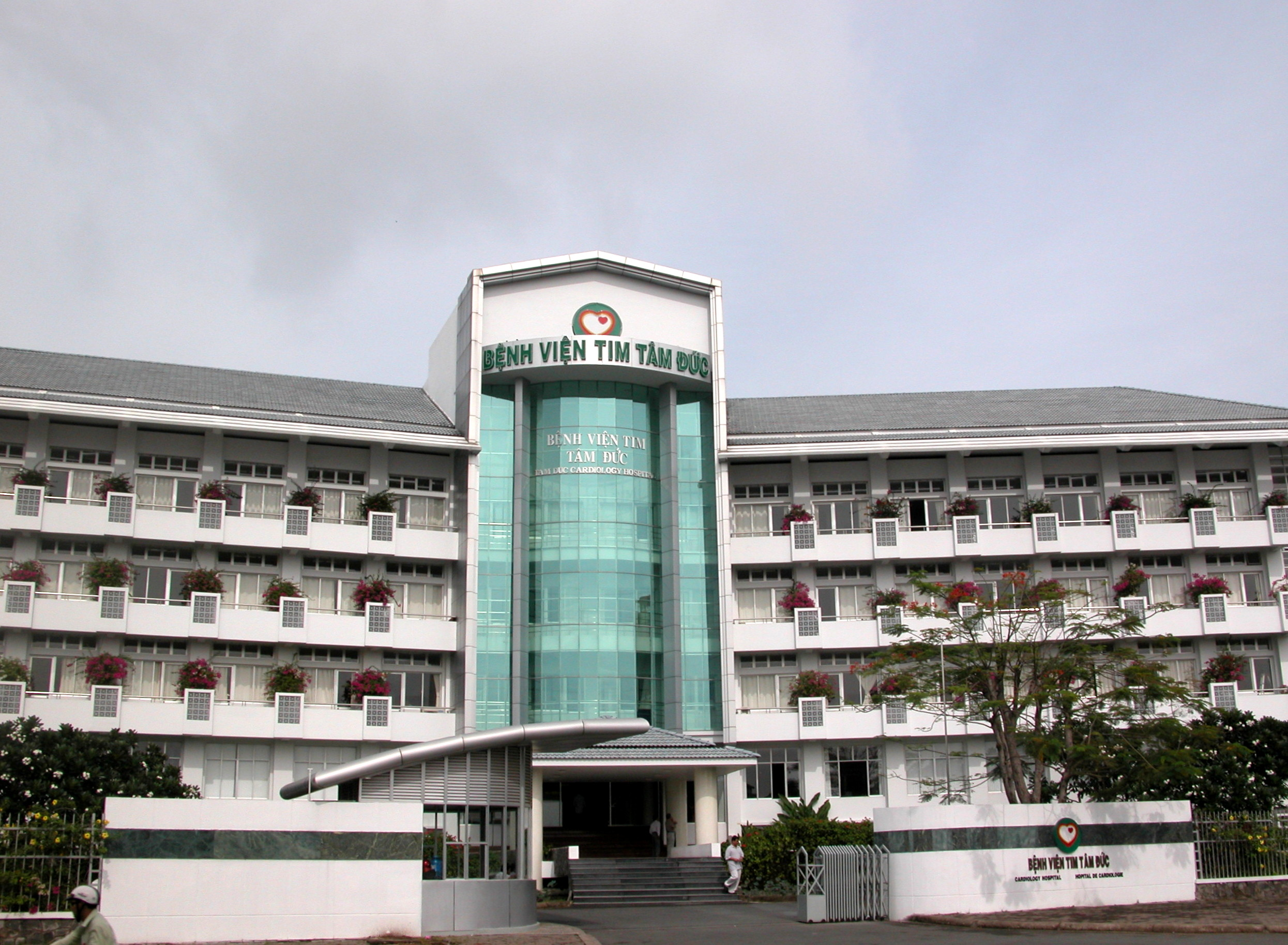
Tâm Đức Cardiology Hospital

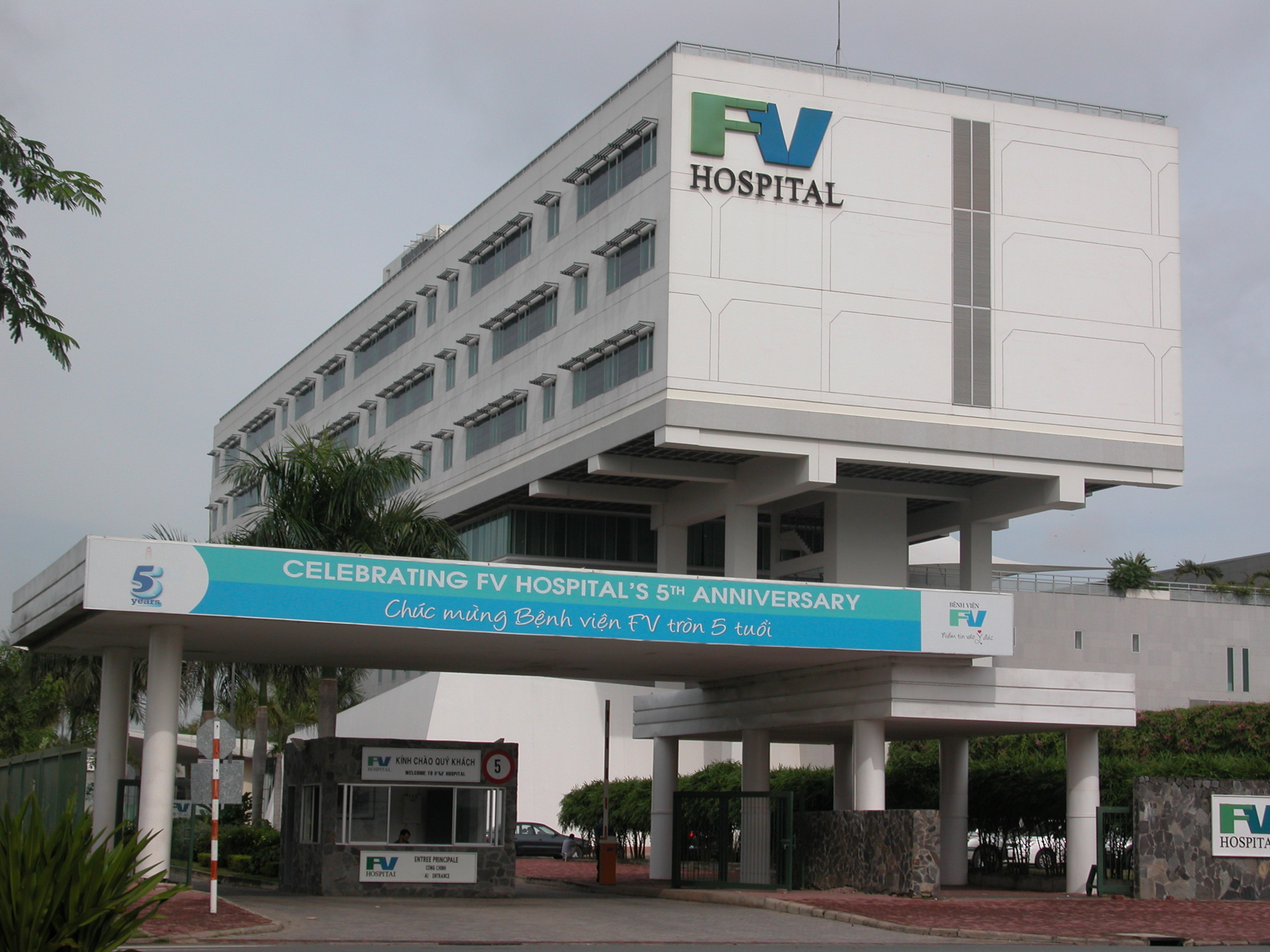
FV Hospital
- Nguyễn Thị Thập General Hospital (Bệnh viện Đa khoa Nguyễn Thị Thập): 101 Nguyễn Thị Thập Street. This hospital is formerly known as District 7 General Hospital (Bệnh viện Đa khoa Quận 7) and not part of the Medical Campus District
- Phương Nam Hospital (Bệnh viện Phương Nam): No. 2 Nguyễn Lương Bằng Avenue
- Tâm Đức Cardiology Hospital (Bệnh viện Tim Tâm Đức): No. 4 Nguyễn Lương Bằng Avenue
- Franco-Vietnamese (FV) Hospital (Bệnh viện Pháp Việt / FV): No. 6 Nguyễn Lương Bằng Avenue

== Education ==
Tân Mỹ ward gathers notable international institution and schools along with public local schools, some of them are:

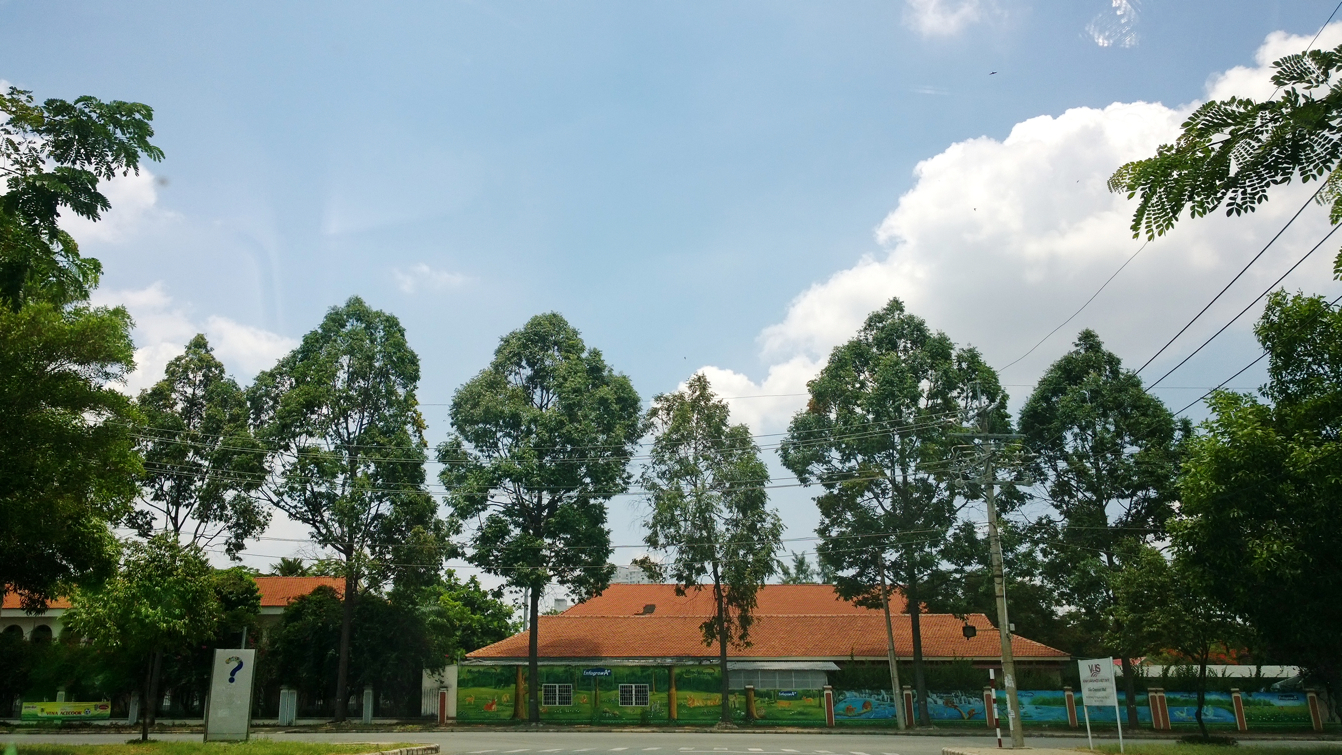
Saigon South Escalator School

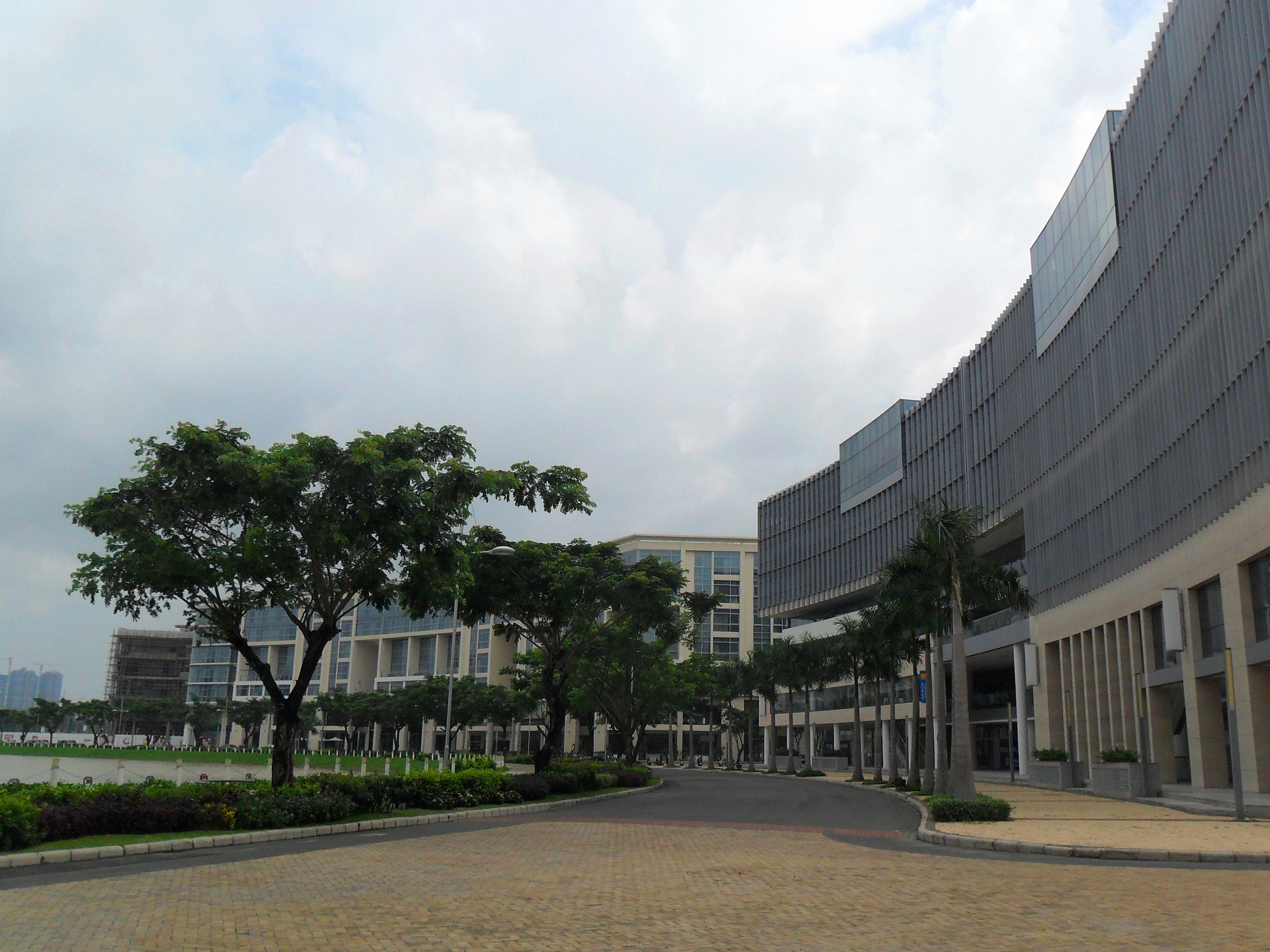
Crescent Plaza, where the Fulbright University Vietnam located
- Fulbright University Vietnam: Crescent Plaza, 105 Tôn Dật Tiên Street
- College of Technology and Industrial Management (CTIM): 15 Trần Văn Trà Street
- Saigon Business School: The Audri Building, No. 7, Road No. 23
- Saigon South Escalator School (Trường Tiểu học-THCS-THPT Nam Sài Gòn): Block P3, Nguyễn Lương Bằng Avenue
- Ngô Quyền High School: 1360, Huỳnh Tấn Phát Street
- Hoàng Quốc Việt Secondary School: B29, Hoàng Quốc Việt Street
- Phạm Hữu Lầu Secondary School: K19, D1 Street
- Korea Global School in Ho Chi Minh City (Trường Quốc Tế Hàn Quốc tại Thành phố Hồ Chí Minh): No. 21, Tân Phú Street
- Taipei School in Ho Chi Minh City (Trường Đài Bắc tại Thành phố Hồ Chí Minh): Block S3, Tân Phú Street
- Canadian International School Vietnam (Trường Quốc tế Canada): No. 7, Road No. 23

== Economy ==
=== Commercial District ===
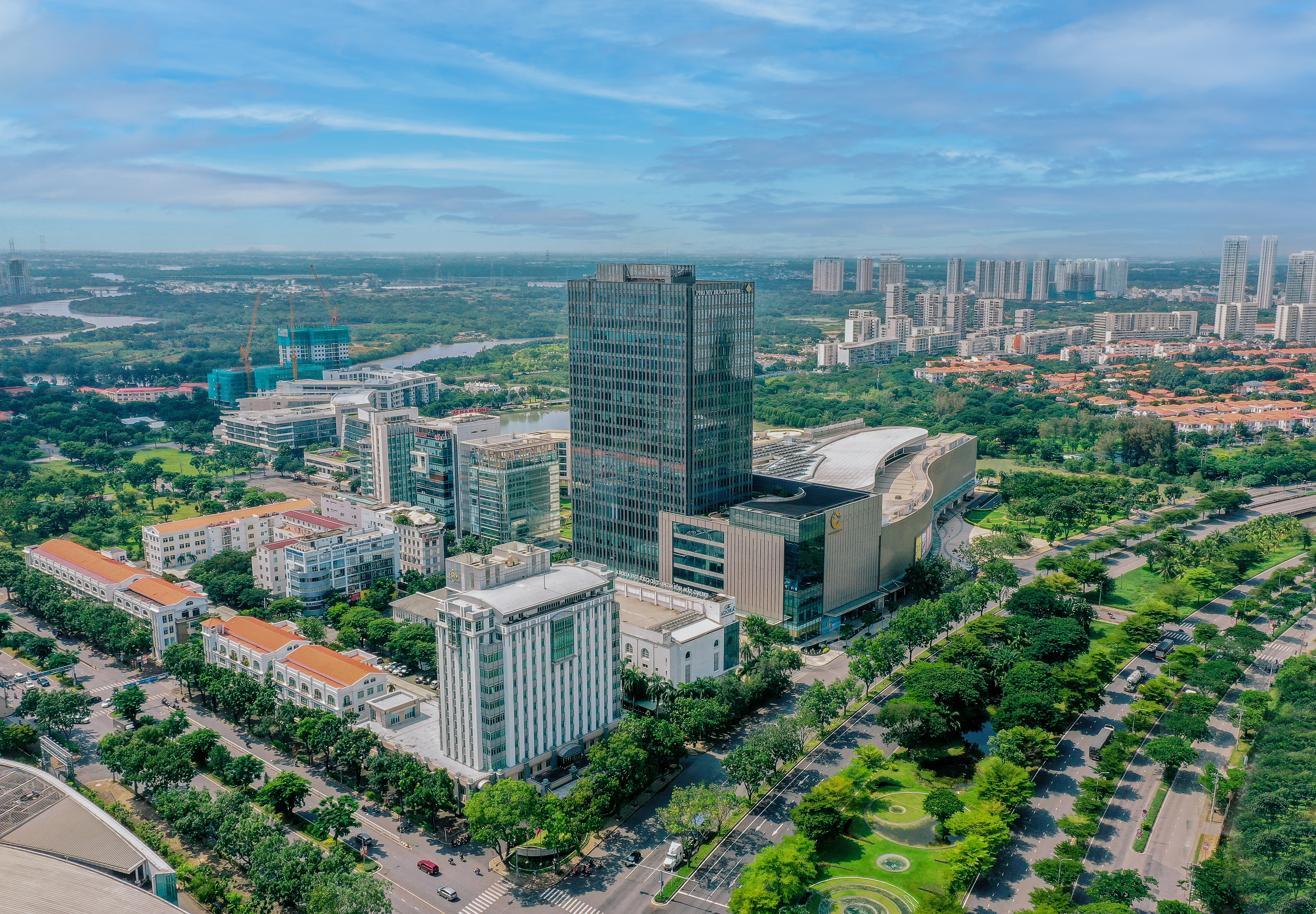
Phú Mỹ Hưng Central Business District

Tân Mỹ ward encompasses the International Commercial and Financial District of Phú Mỹ Hưng Urban Area with many companies have offices here, from domestic to foreign, are: Phu My Hung Corporation, Vinamilk, UOA Group, Manulife Vietnam, Unilever Vietnam, KPMG Vietnam - Paragon Office, MoMo (a digital wallet company of Vietnam), etc, with many domestic and foreign banks opened their transactions and branches here. Some of the public facilities of the city are located here are Ho Chi Minh City Social Security, Women's Cultural House Branch 2 and the Saigon Exhibition and Convention Center is also located here, hosting not just events for businesses but also entertainment events.

=== Retail ===
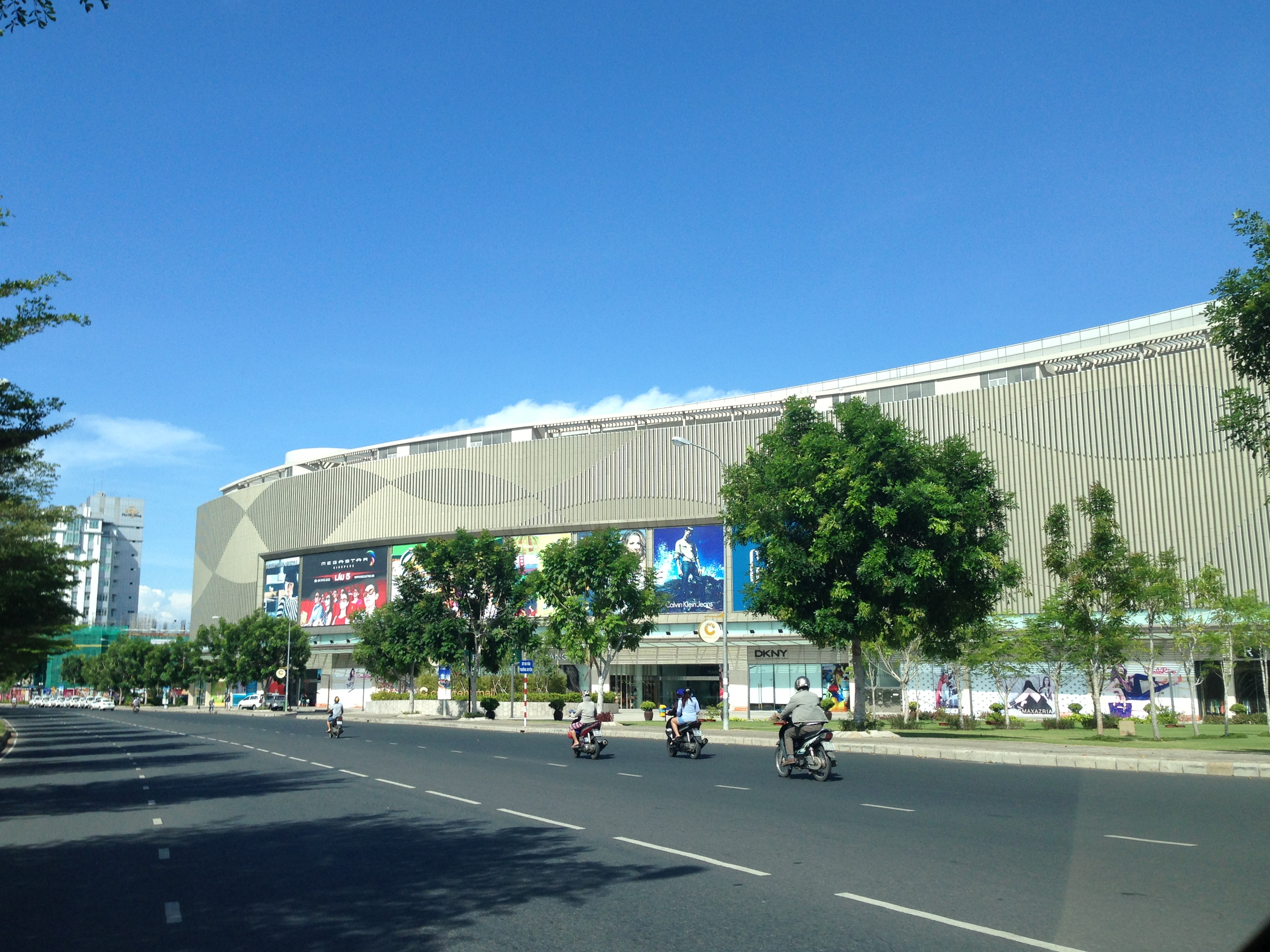
Crescent Mall

The Crescent District, a subzone of Phú Mỹ Hưng urban area that more focuses on retail next to the Commercial District and named after the Crescent Lake that the district surrounds, it features the Crescent Mall, a luxury-style mall with an estimated area of 112,000 m^{2} (1,210,000 sq ft), it has opened from November 2011, some notable tenants are: Sony, Samsung Electronics, Bose, Calvin Klein, Chanel, Dior, GAP, Tommy Hilfiger, CGV Cinema, AEON Super-Supermarket,... with numerous F&B services inside. Other buildings along the lakeshore include the Crescent Plaza, a building for office tenants and services, and the Crescent Residences 1, 2 and 3, the apartment buildings with the shophouses at the base are called as Crescent Strip.

=== Hospitality ===
The ward has some notable hotels are: ibis Saigon South Hotel, Novotel Living Saigon South (formerly Capri by Frasers Ho Chi Minh City), MerPerle Crystal Palace and The Waterfront Residence.

== Gallery ==
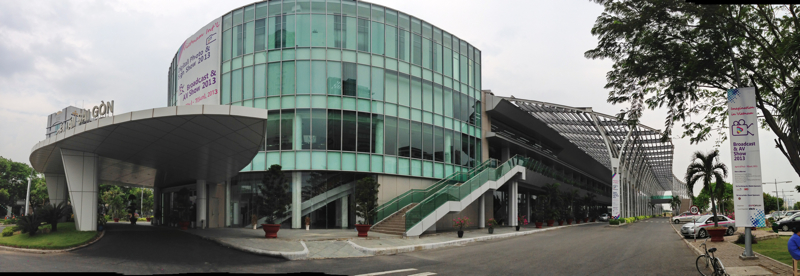
Saigon Exhibition and Convention Center (SECC)

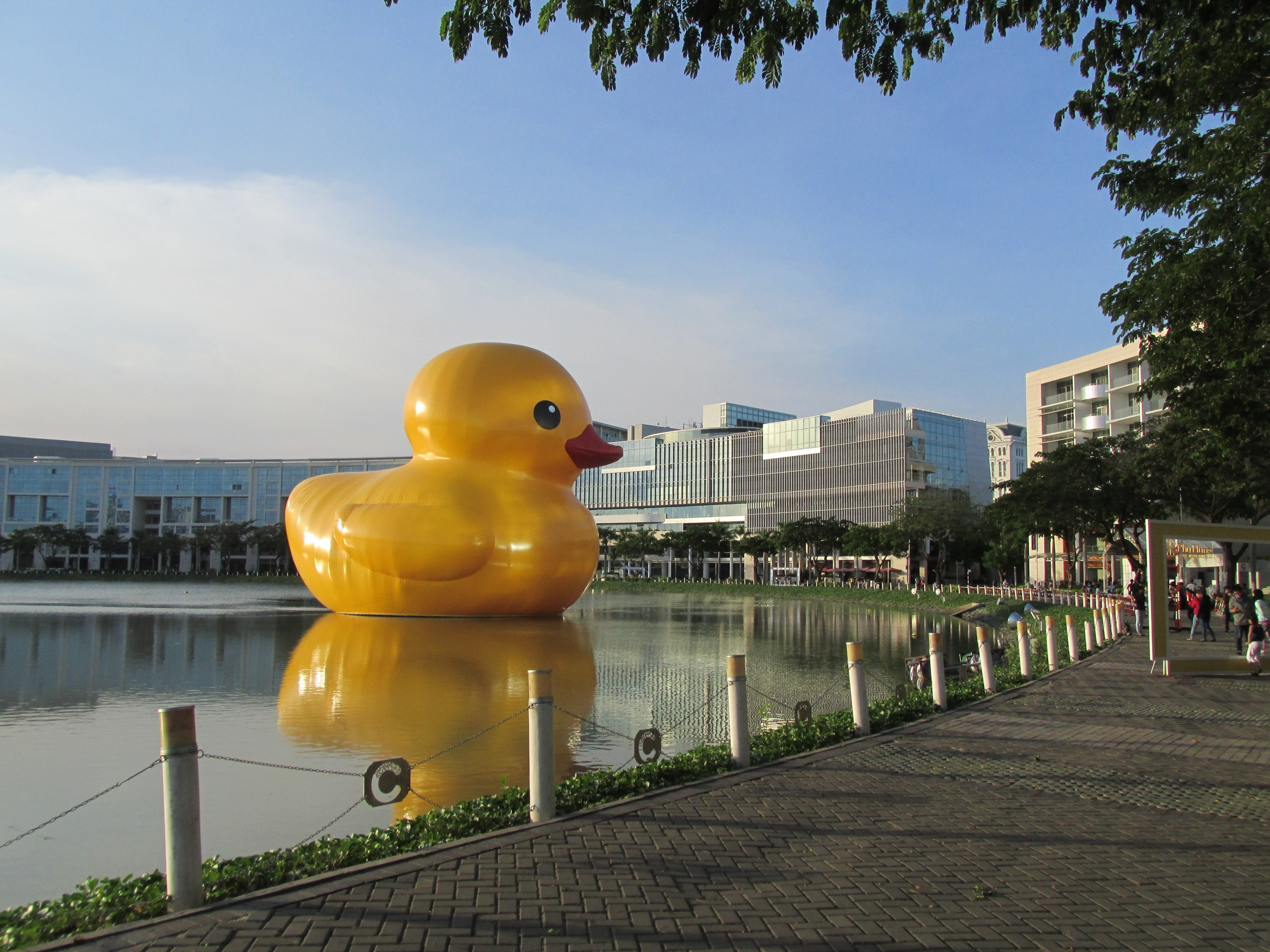
Crescent Lake with the Rubber Duck in 2014

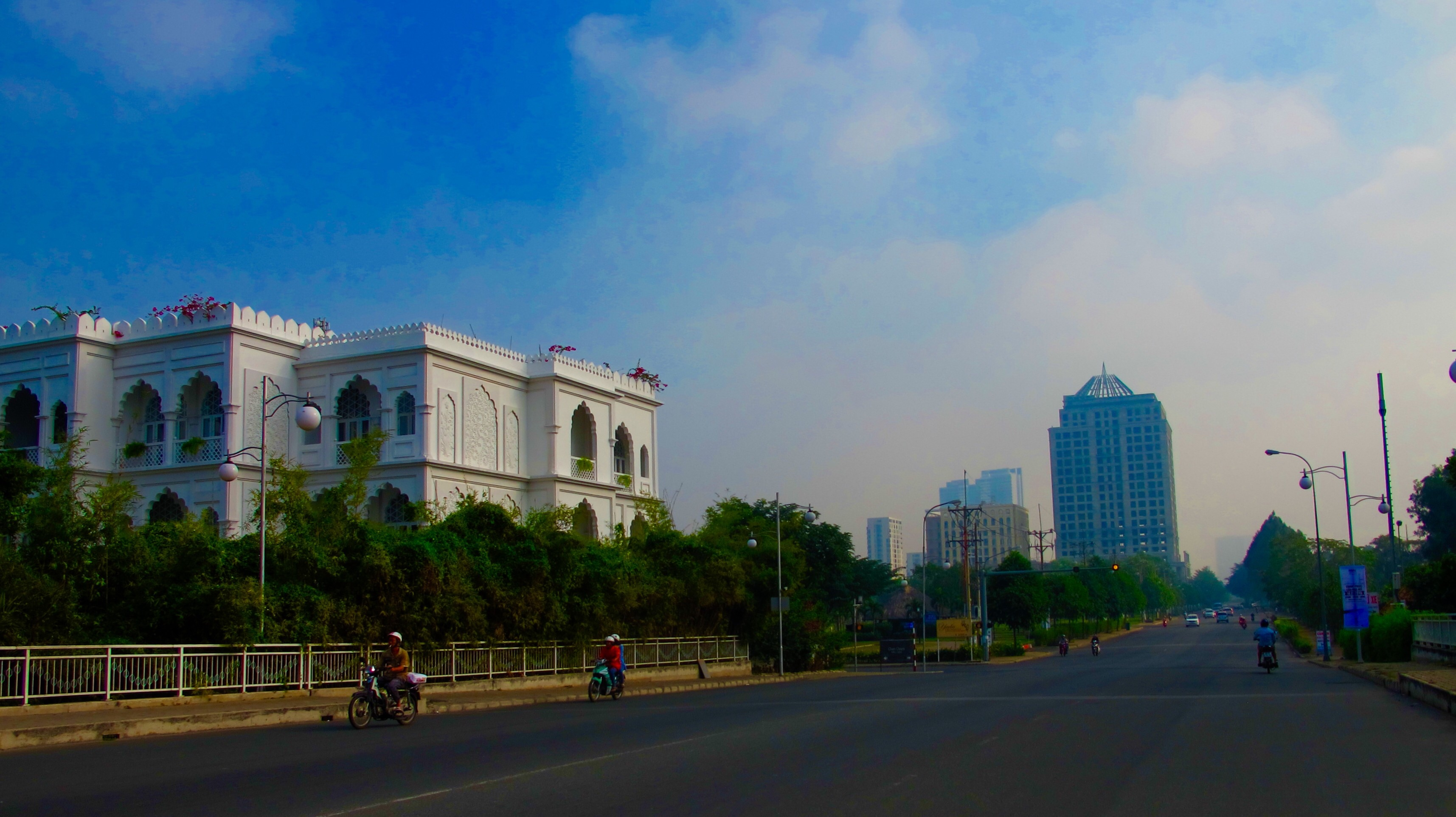
Thầy Tiêu 2 Bridge on Trần Văn Trà Street

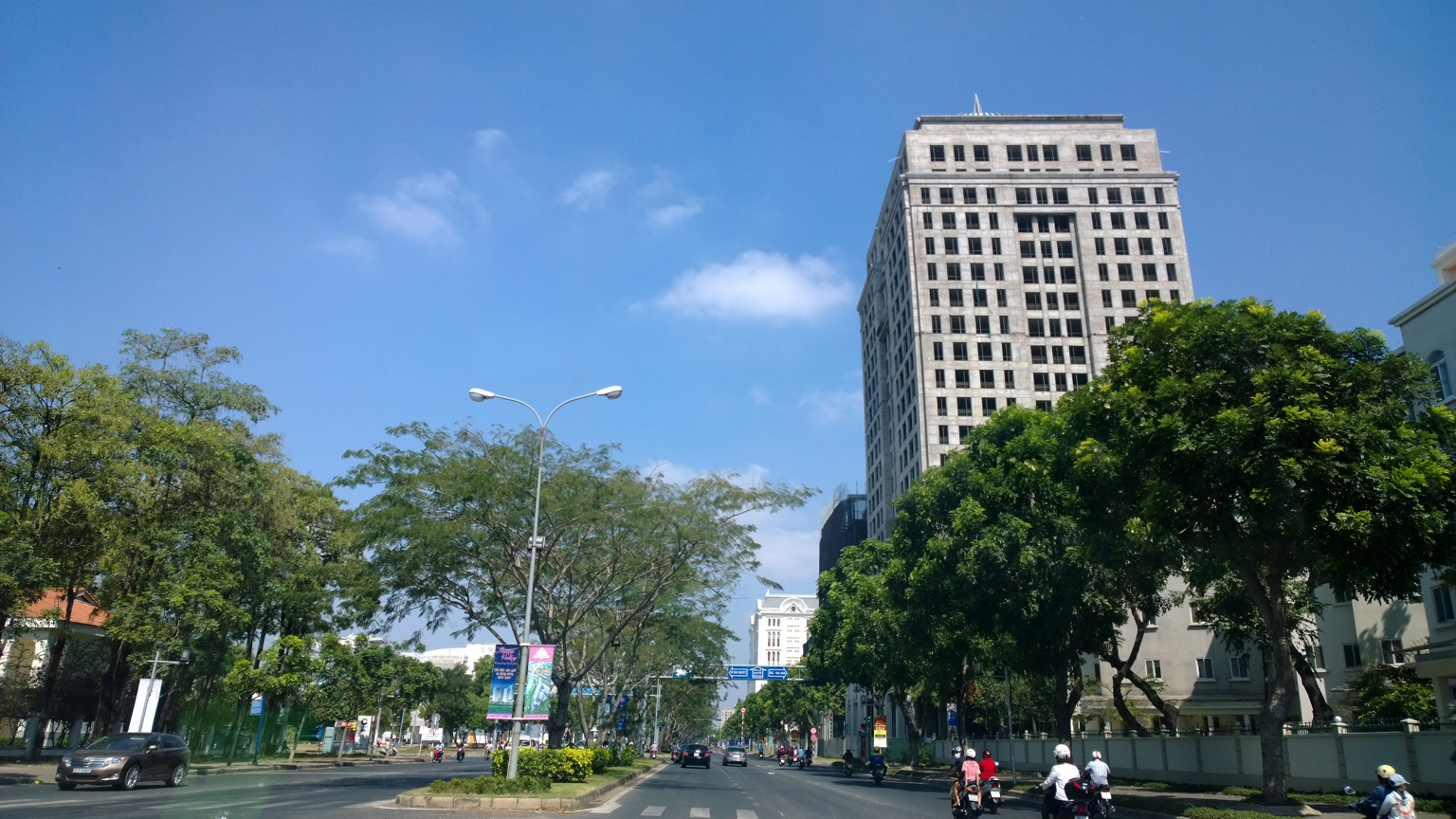
Nguyễn Lương Bằng Avenue

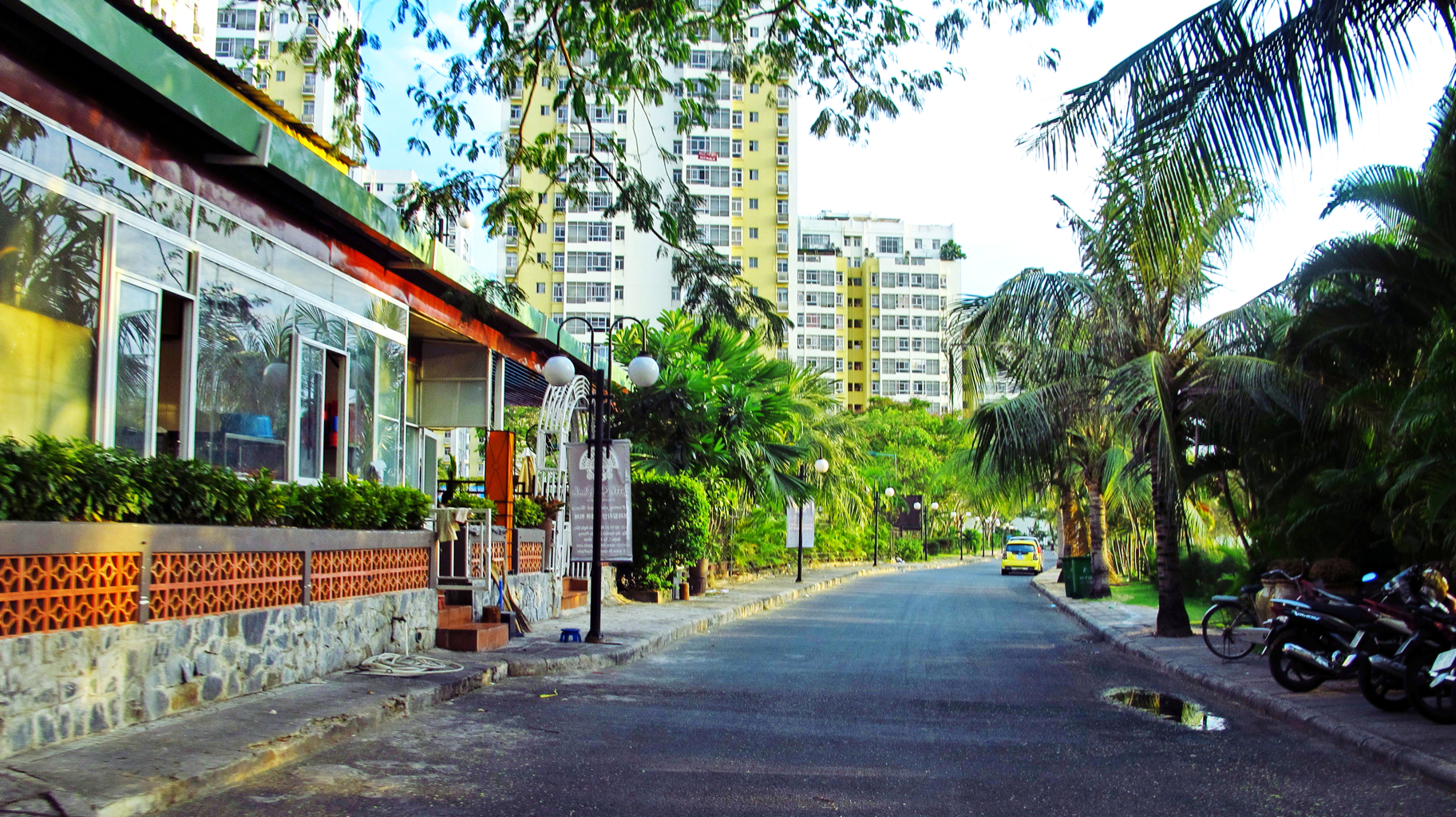
Sky Garden condos

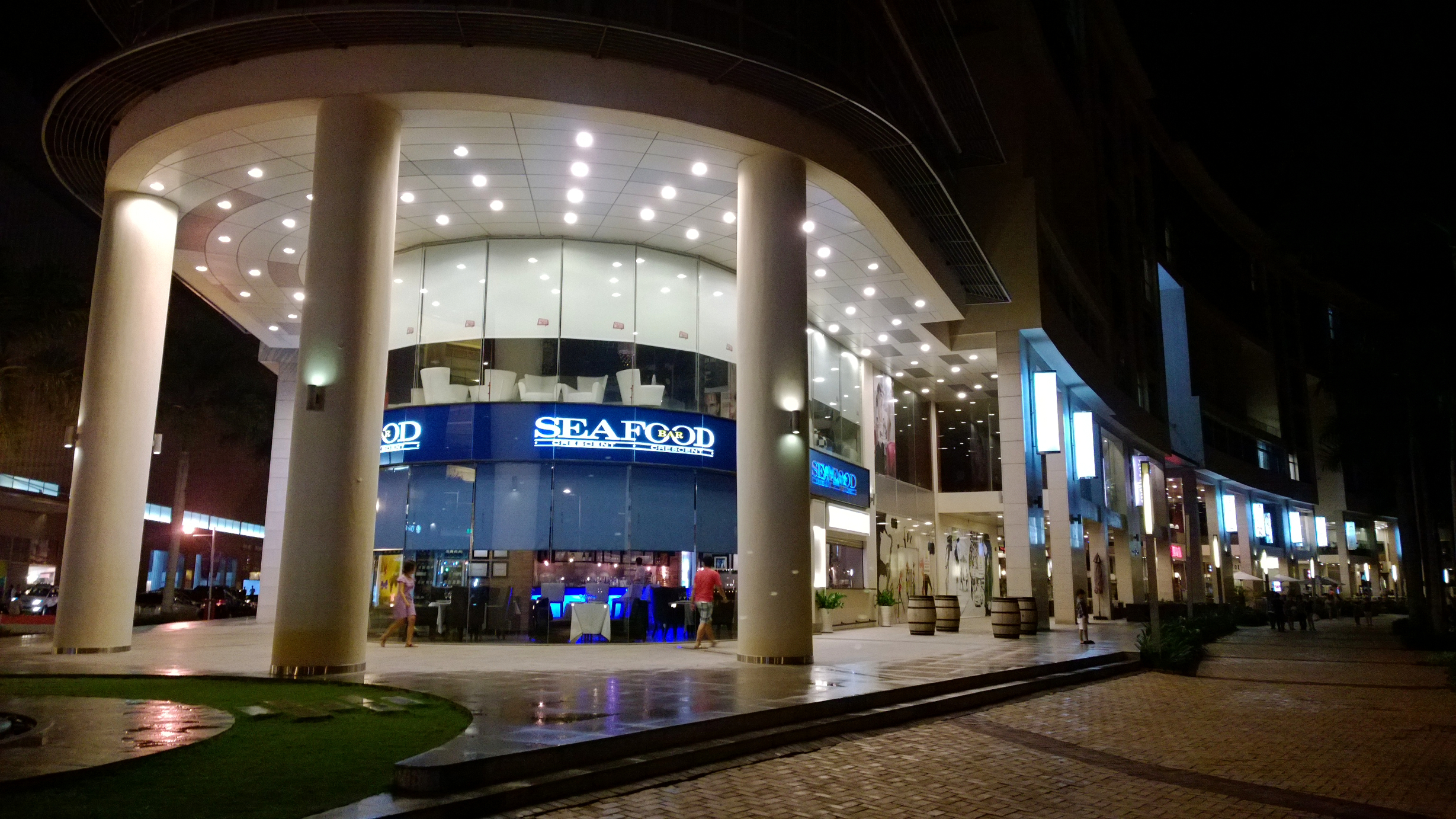
Crescent Strip
