= Phú Mỹ Hưng Urban Area =

Planned community in Ho Chi Minh City, Vietnam

Phú Mỹ Hưng Urban Area Khu đô thị Phú Mỹ Hưng Khu đô thị Nam Sài Gòn / Nam Thành phố
- New town
- Saigon South Urban Development
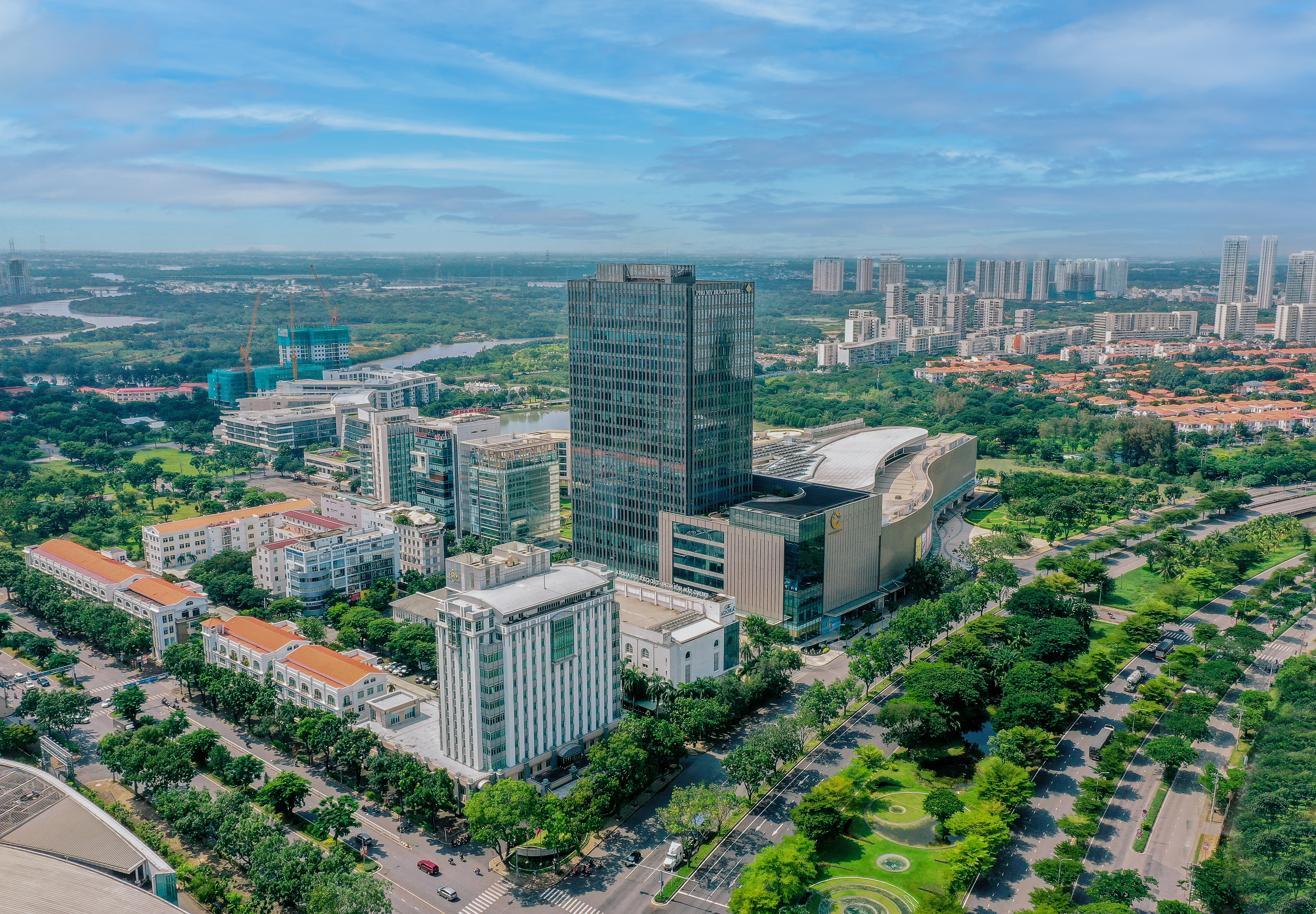
- View of Financial District of the Phú Mỹ Hưng urban area in Saigon South
- Interactive map of Phú Mỹ Hưng Urban Area
- Country: Vietnam
- Municipality: Ho Chi Minh City
- Wards: Tân Hưng, Tân Mỹ, Bình Hưng, Bình Đông, Bình Chánh

Area
  - Total: 750 ha (1,900 acres)

Phú Mỹ Hưng Urban Area (Vietnamese: Khu đô thị Phú Mỹ Hưng) or Saigon South Urban Development (Khu đô thị Nam Sài Gòn, Khu đô thị Nam Thành phố) is a planned community in District 7, District 8 and Bình Chánh district, Ho Chi Minh City. The area is managed by the Phu My Hung Development Corporation.

On June 26, 2008, the Ministry of Construction and the People's Committee of Ho Chi Minh City recognized Phú Mỹ Hưng urban area as a "model urban area" of Vietnam.

== Location ==
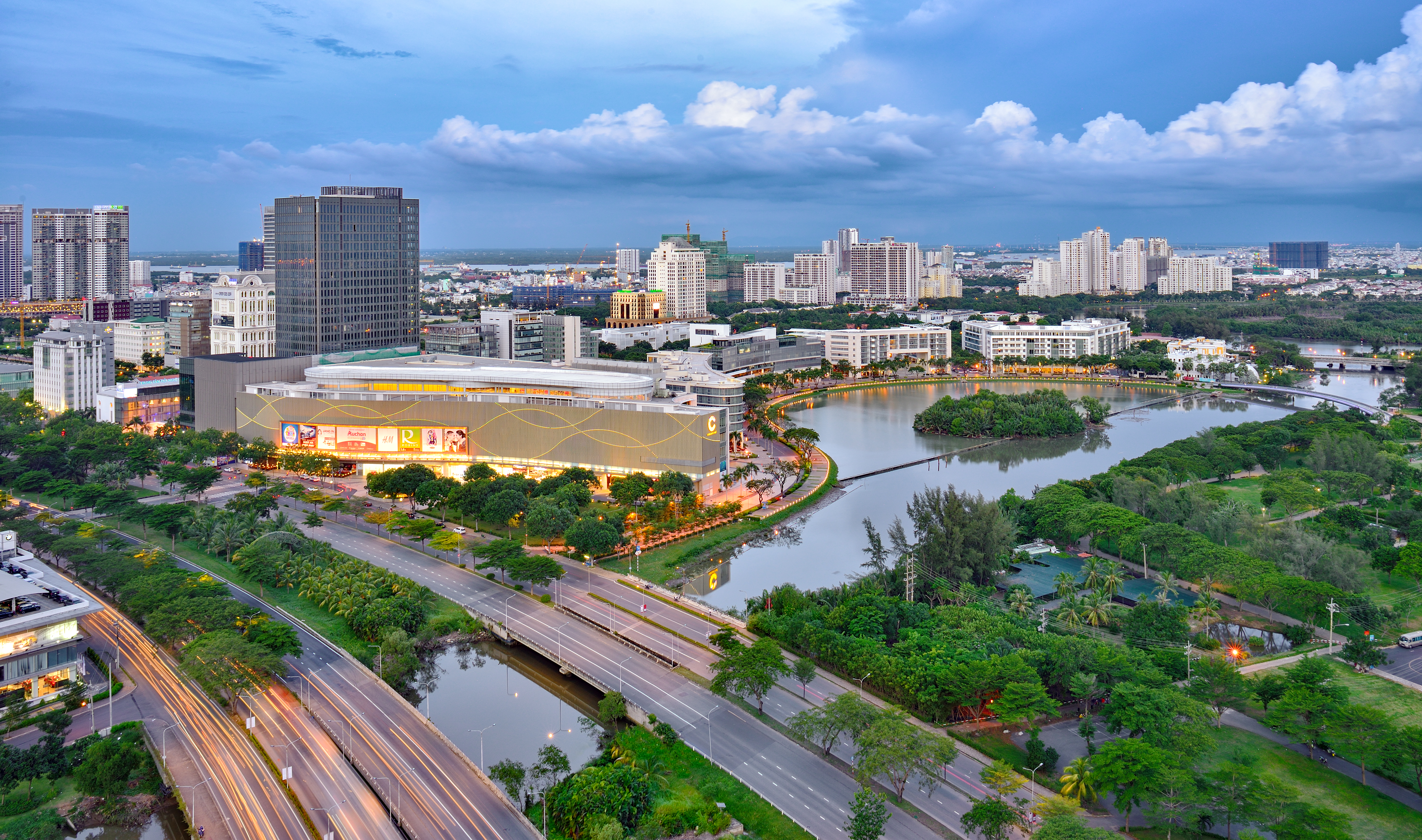
View of Nguyễn Văn Linh Avenue with the C District and CR District in Zone A - Phú Mỹ Hưng City Center

Phú Mỹ Hưng is located along Nguyễn Văn Linh Boulevard, an arterial route through the South Saigon area included District 7, 8 and Bình Chánh; run from Tân Thuận bridge to National Route 1 and directly connected to Ho Chi Minh City–Trung Luong Expressway and Ben Luc – Long Thanh Expressway. It is spread over 3,300 hectares of land. The area used to be dense marshland and is defined by many waterways.

The whole area divided into 5 subzones, named as: A, B, C, D, E.

== History ==
The Phú Mỹ Hưng development was founded in 1993 by the Phu My Hung Development Corporation (Vietnamese: Công ty TNHH Phát triển Phú Mỹ Hưng), a joint venture between the Taiwanese CT & D group and the HCMC Government. The development was planned and has won awards on its urban planning. Since the late 1990s Phu My Hung has grown in size and population.

Every year since 2006 the Lawrence Ting Charity Walk has been held in Phú Mỹ Hưng – raising a total of $1.7m (up to 2023). It is hosted by the Phu My Hung Development Corporation.

== Demographics ==
In 2018, Phu My Hung's population was over 30,000 people, more than 50% of whom were foreigners from dozens of countries (according to Phu My Hung Development Company Limited). The largest number were still citizens of countries and territories in Asia, most coming from Korea, Japan, Taiwan, China...

== Subzones ==
Phu My Hung Corporation is allowed to exploit and develop 5 urban clusters (750 hectares) from the 2600-hectares South Saigon Urban Area, forming an international commercial and financial center in Southeast Asia:

- Zone A – New urban center (409 hectares): is the focal point of the entire urban area, attracting investors and businesses. With the architecture inspired by Causeway Bay in Hong Kong.
- Zone B – University Village Area (95 hectares): inspired by the idea and experience of the community formation project around Silicon Valley in San Jose, California and the science and technology industrial parks in Taiwan. The University Village Area is a mixed-use functional area including residential areas, commercial areas, local services and public works (occupying 18 hectares). Some well-known universities have opened campuses here, e.g. HungHau Campus of Văn Hiến University, Campus N of UEH, Ho Chi Minh City Campus of RMIT Vietnam branch from Australia, etc.
- Zone C – High-Tech Center (46 ha): located at the intersection of Nguyễn Văn Linh and District Road 7 (now is Trịnh Quang Nghị Road), where enterprises related to high-tech industrial development technology in Vietnam are concentrated, surrounded by a multi-functional area that creates full conditions for those living and working here.
- Zone D – Merchandise Circulation Center II (85 ha): located at the junction of Bến Lức River and Cần Giuộc River, convenient for port facilities, a major hub for distribution and circulation of goods, a place for storing food, related industrial warehouses, with a number of mixed-use commercial and residential areas, with 5 ha for public works.
- Zone E – Merchandise Circulation Center I (115 ha): located at the Bình Thuận intersection of National Route 1, HCMC–Trung Lương Expressway and Nguyễn Văn Linh Parkway, including 5 districts: International Commercial District, Nguyen Van Linh Commercial Parkway, Industrial Warehouse, Port and Goods Transportation, Mixed-use Residence. Zone E is conveniently located for the circulation of goods from all directions by water and road. The land reserved for public works occupies 14 hectares.

== City center ==
Zone A, the first subzone to be completed, is the Phú Mỹ Hưng New City Center (or New Urban Center), located entirely in District 7 with an area of 433 hectares. "Phú Mỹ Hưng urban area" is often called as a metonomy for this zone, it is divided into 8 functional districts, including:

- The International Commercial and Financial District – C District: Simply known as The Financial District (FiDi), it is most important district of the zone, often known as the CBD of South Saigon, along with the Thủ Thiêm new urban area and the historical city centre included District 1 and 3, is one of the most important CBD of Ho Chi Minh City with many office buildings are built here e.g. UOA Tower, Vinamilk Tower, Manulife Plaza, Saigon Paragon, Lawrence S. Ting Building, and the Victory Tower of Petroland (the current highest tower in District 7 and South Saigon area), etc. Multinational groups also banks, exchange and financial companies open their offices here, some notable tenants here are Vinamilk, the Vietnam subsidiaries of UOA Group, Unilever, Manulife, KPMG, etc. The Saigon Exhibition and Convention Center (SECC) is also located here, which has hosted many major exhibitions, conferences, and concerts. The district is also home to the District 7 Administration Center and the. Moreover, there's still have residences, condotels and hotels constructions including Saigon South Hotel of French hotel brand Ibis, Capri Hotel Residences and Star Hill Residences, Dinh Thien Ly 1 School also here. In the Phú Mỹ Hưng 2.0 period, the Phú Mỹ Hưng Cultural & Art Center at the C10 lot will be built, and next to it is two new buildings of Tâm Anh Hospital. A new commercial complex building will also built to replaced the Lawrence S. Ting building with The Adora Convention Center and The Broadway Building, it is initially named as Phú Mỹ Hưng Landmark.

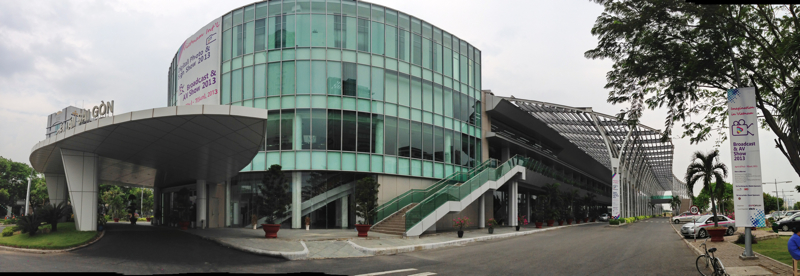
The Saigon Exhibition and Convention Center (SECC) in Financial District

- The Crescent District – CR District: Inspired by Marina Bay, Singapore, the district is home to the well-known Crescent Lake (Hồ Bán Nguyệt), the central lake of the whole area, and the pedestrian Starlight Bridge (Cầu Ánh Sao) with Moonlight Bridge (Cầu Ánh Trăng) to cross the lake and connect with the other districts. Along the lake is the Crescent complex on Sun Yat-sen Street (Đường Tôn Dật Tiên) named after Sun Yat-sen, with a residential area called Crescent Residence, low rise office-leasing area Crescent Plaza, where Fulbright University Vietnam located, and the shopping centre with high rise office tower Crescent Mall and Phú Mỹ Hưng Tower, the complex still has a hotel building is waiting for inauguration.

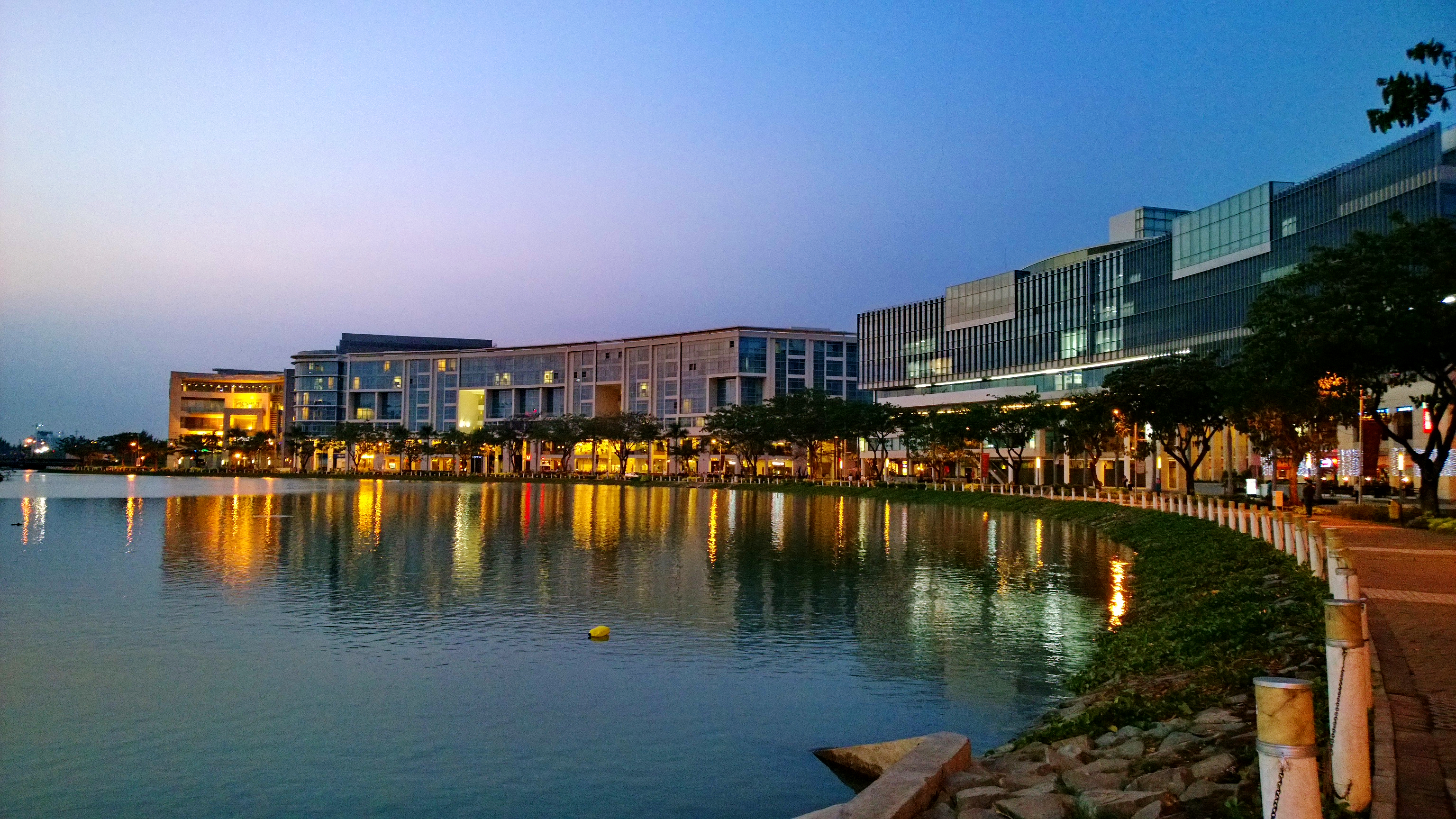
View of Tôn Dật Tiên street with the Crescent Complex in The Crescent District at night, from the Starlight Bridge

- The Canal District – CN District: Imitated by the Canal District of Venice, Los Angeles, the district is where many shophouses and residential buildings are built.
- The Hillview District – H District: The first residential area to be constructed and operated. Saigon South International School (SSIS) and Đinh Thiện Lý school (named after ) are two notable schools of the district. The district has two well-known park is The Hillview Park located next to the west of the Crescent Lake a, and the P2 Park on the north bank of Đỉa Canal adjacent to Nhà Bè District, the convention center Saigon South Marina Club with a pier is located in this park.
- The Midtown District – M District: the central business district along Nguyễn Lương Bằng boulevard, located between Southside District and the International Commercial and Financial District. Villas and high-class apartments also here.
- The Medical Campus District – MD District: including medical facilities, nursing, services, shopping, sports, entertainment,... meeting the diverse needs of people from medical and healthcare to services such as FV Hospital (220 beds), Tâm Đức Heart Hospital (180 beds), Vietnam-America Hospital,... and other health care facilities. The Nursing Health Zone also has a cluster of recreational sports facilities such as a golf driving range, a 9-hole golf course, a sandy bottom swimming pool and 4 tennis courts.
- The Recreational and Cultural District – R District: The main works here are townhouses and apartments, including Hưng Thái townhouses and villas, Hưng Gia townhouses, Hưng Phước, Sky Garden apartment complex with a pedestrian and shopping area on the 2nd floor of the apartment complex, Wonderland Park and riverside park.
- The Southside District – S District: a high-end residential district, including villa areas: The Chateau Castle Villa, Mỹ Gia 1–2, Mỹ Thái 1–2–3, Mỹ Phú 1–2, Mỹ Văn and the apartment complexes of Cảnh Viên 1–2, Mỹ Viên, Mỹ Khang, Green View. The district is like an oasis surrounded by rivers, with low construction density because there are many parks with a green cover density of about 10,000 to 20,000m². Located next to the International Commercial and Financial District and the Crescent District on the same axis of Nguyễn Lương Bằng boulevard with a width of 48m. Southside District is also home to many foreign schools for Japanese, Korean, Taiwanese.

== See also ==
- Thủ Thiêm new urban area
- Linh Đàm
