= Saigon Exhibition and Convention Center =

Exhibition center in Ho Chi Minh City, Vietnam

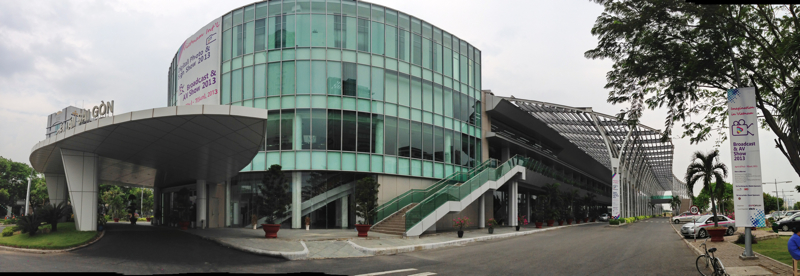
- Hall A of SECC in April 2013
- Interactive map of Saigon Exhibition and Convention Center
- Address: 799 Nguyễn Văn Linh Parkway; Tân Mỹ, Ho Chi Minh City; Vietnam
- Location: International Commercial and Financial District, Phú Mỹ Hưng urban area
- Coordinates: 10.731210°N 106.721481°E
- Owner: Saigontourist Group; Phu My Hung Corporation
- Operator: Saigon Exhibition and Convention J.V. Co., Ltd.
- Capacity: 2,000 - 10,000

Construction
- Built: 2006; 20 years ago
- Expanded: April 26, 2022; 4 years ago
- Cost: VN₫1.158 trillion
- Architect: Nikken Sekkei

Website
- secc.com.vn

The Saigon Exhibition and Convention Center (SECC; Vietnamese: Trung tâm Hội chợ và Triển lãm Sài Gòn) is a convention and exhibition center located in the International Commercial and Financial District of the Phú Mỹ Hưng urban area, in Tân Mỹ (formerly District 7), Ho Chi Minh City, Vietnam. Currently, it is the largest exhibition and convention facility in southern Vietnam.

== Facilities ==
The Saigon Exhibition and Convention Center (SECC) features four exhibition halls with a total area of 40,000 square meters:

- Convention Center Area: A dedicated zone for hosting meetings, seminars, and major corporate events.
- Exhibition Center Area: A venue for showcasing and promoting the latest products, services, and technologies from businesses worldwide, subdivided into distinct exhibition halls.
- Weddings and Events Area: A space for hosting banquets, celebrations, and other special occasions.
- SECC Culinary Fair Area: A hub featuring a variety of restaurants and cafes.

The facility also offers an outdoor space ranging from 15,000 to 20,000 square meters and includes a conference zone with a seating capacity of over 2,000 people. The combined capacity of all four areas can accommodate up to 10,000 people. SECC has been honored with numerous international accolades, including "Vietnam’s Best Convention Center" (World MICE Awards 2021–2023), "ASEAN MICE Venue 2024," and "Top 10 Asian Golden Brands" (2024)."Saigon Exhibition and Convention Center overview". Paper Vietnam.</ref>

== Access ==
The center is located about 45 minutes from Tan Son Nhat International Airport in the south by the city main north-sound axis road and 40km in the west of the upcoming Long Thanh International Airport via the Ring Road 2 (Phú Mỹ Bridge) and Ho Chi Minh City–Long Thanh–Dau Giay Expressway.

The MRTs directly connect to it are Lines 6, 7, and 10, a high-speed line from Ben Thanh station connect with Cần Giờ district has a potential Tân Thuận station that near Cả Cấm Bridge on Nguyễn Lương Bằng Boulevard and it just 700 meters away from the SECC; all are believed to be inaugurated in late 2027. It is also accessible via various bus routes.

== Notable events ==
List of notable entertainment events
Date	Artist	Event	Ref.
2020 - 2024
February 1, 2020	Winner	Cross Tour	
June 25, 2022	Various	Miss Universe Vietnam 2022	
September 26, 2023	Xiumin; Suho; Ailee; Eunjung; Cherry Bullet	Adex Kpop Super Concert in Vietnam	
October 26, 2024	Vũ.	The Museum of Regret	
2025
January 8	Various	Sóng 25 – Live Concert	
February 15–16	2NE1	Welcome Back Tour	
May 31	Babymonster	Hello Monsters World Tour	
October 18	Day6	Day6 10th Anniversary Tour "The Decade"	
December 7	Low G Rhyder; Hieuthuhai; BigDaddy; Hoàng Dũng; Vũ. Chillies; Wean; Vstra; Màu Nước Band; Shiki; MAYDAYs	Year-End Concert: City of Miracle	
December 13	LingOrm	LingOrm 2025 Fanmeeting in Vietnam	
2026
March 21	Super Junior	Super Show 10	
April 25	Exo	Exo Planet 6 – Exhorizon	
