= Tân Thuận, Ho Chi Minh City =

Tân Thuận Phường Tân Thuận Tân Thuận Đông
- Ward
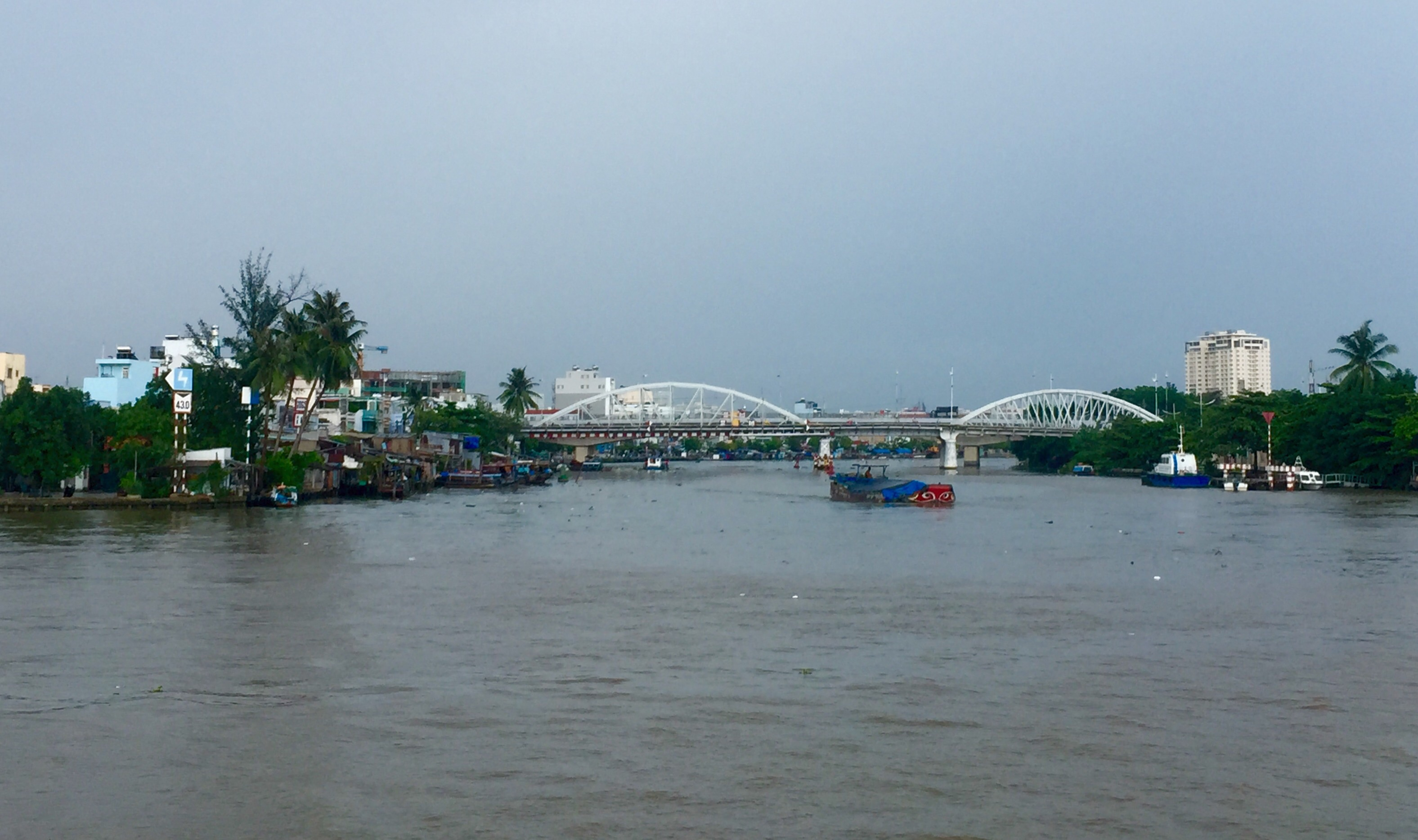
- Tân Thuận Bridge
- Interactive map of Tân Thuận
- Coordinates: 10°45′18″N 106°44′11″E
- Country: Vietnam
- Municipality: Ho Chi Minh City
- Established: June 16, 2025

Area
  - Total: 3.92 sq mi (10.16 km^{2})

Population (2024)
  - Total: 148,090
  - Density: 37,750/sq mi (14,580/km^{2})
- Time zone: UTC+07:00 (Indochina Time)
- Administrative code: 27478

Tân Thuận (Vietnamese: Phường Tân Thuận) is a ward of Ho Chi Minh City, Vietnam. It is one of the 168 new wards, communes and special zones of the city following the reorganization in 2025.

== Geography ==
Tân Thuận EPZ seen from above

Tân Thuận is located in the urban core of Ho Chi Minh City, 5 km to the south of Saigon, it has the following geographical location:

- To the northwest, it borders Xóm Chiếu by Tẻ Canal
- To the west, it borders Tân Hưng by Lâm Văn Bền street
- To the north and east, it borders An Khánh, Bình Trưng and Cát Lái by Saigon River
- To the south, it borders Tân Mỹ and Phú Thuận by Nguyễn Thị Thập and Nguyễn Văn Quỳ street.

According to Official Dispatch No. 2896/BNV-CQĐP dated May 27, 2025 of the Ministry of Home Affairs, following the merger, Tân Mỹ has a land area of 10.16 km², the population as of December 31, 2024 is 148,090 people, the population density is 14,575 people/km².

== Division ==
Ward of Tân Thuận is divided into 63 quarters, numbered from 1 to 63.

== History ==
Under the Nguyễn dynasty, Tân Thuận Đông was a village of Bình Trị Hạ canton, Bình Dương county (or district), Tân Bình fu, Gia Định province. Until the French Indochina, the government then placed the Bình Trị Hạ canton under Nhà Bè county, Gia Định province.

After 1956, villages are designated as communes (xã); Tân Thuận Đông became a commune of Nhà Bè county.

After 1975, Tân Thuận Đông commune renamed as Tân Thuận commune under Nhà Bè district, Ho Chi Minh City.

On July 17, 1986, the Council of Ministers issued Decision 87-HĐBT. Accordingly, Tan Thuan Commune is divided into two communes: Tân Thuận Đông and Tân Thuận Tây.

Upon its establishment, Tân Thuận Đông Commune had a natural area of 663 hectares and a population of 9,478.

On January 6, 1997, the Government issued Decree No. 03-CP. Accordingly, Tân Thuận Đông commune is transferred to the newly established District 7, and Tân Thuận Đông ward is established based on the entire natural area of 812 hectares and population of 12,228 of Tân Thuận Đông commune.

On June 16, 2025, the National Assembly Standing Committee issued Resolution No. 1685/NQ-UBTVQH15 on the arrangement of commune-level administrative units of Ho Chi Minh City in 2025 (effective from June 16, 2025). Accordingly, the entire land area and population of Bình Thuận, Tân Thuận Đông and Tân Thuận Tây wards of the former District 7 will be integrated into a new ward named Tân Thuận (Clause 18, Article 1).

== Economy ==
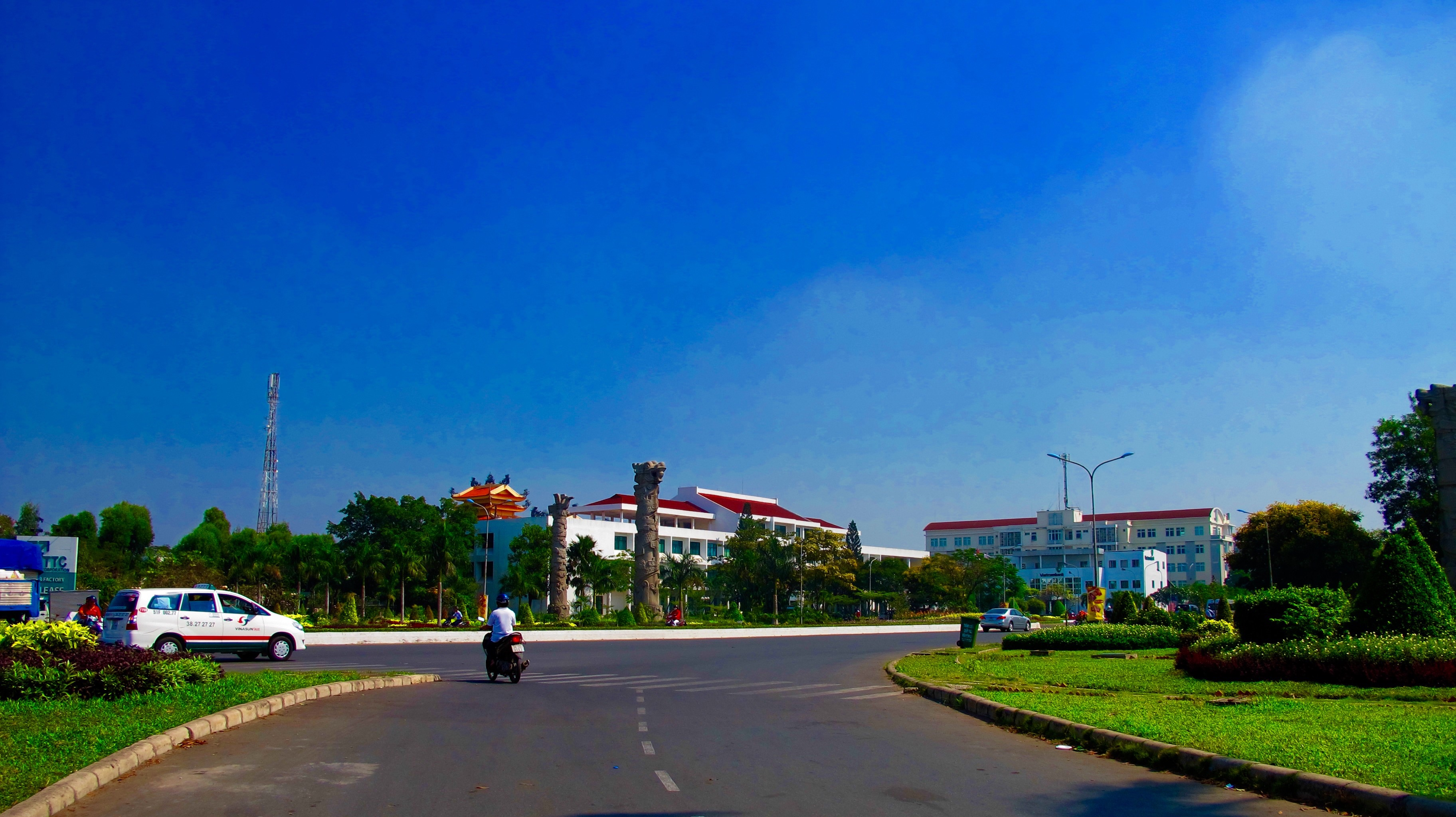
Tân Thuận EPZ entrance

Tân Thuận Export Processing Zone (Tân Thuận EPZ; Khu chế xuất Tân Thuận), established in 1991, was Vietnam's first export processing zone. It located in the ward and was the place of the former Saigon Export Processing Zone before 1975, covers an area of 300 hectares and is situated adjacent to the Phú Mỹ Hưng Urban Area. Enterprises operating within the zone primarily engage in manufacturing for export, some of notable manufactures here are: Bình Tây Food Company, Nidec, Pepperl+Fuchs, Danieli, Renesas Electronics, Furukawa Electric; the Nhà Bè Garment Corporation is not in the zone but next to it on the main road of the zone, Bến Nghé Street. Goods and raw materials entering or leaving the zone are treated as exports and imports, and the enterprises benefit from preferential import-export tax rates. The ports associated with the operations of the export processing zone are: Tân Thuận Port, Tân Thuận Đông Port, Saigon – Tân Thuận 2 Port, VICT – Tân Thuận Port, Bến Nghé Port and Saigon Shipbuilding Industry Company Limited. Certain public agencies help ensure security for the export processing zone and the maritime channel, such as the firefighting and prevention team, customs sub-department, Bến Nghé Border Gate Border Guard Station, Tân Thuận Export Processing Zone Gas Station and Tân Thuận Export Processing Zone Post.

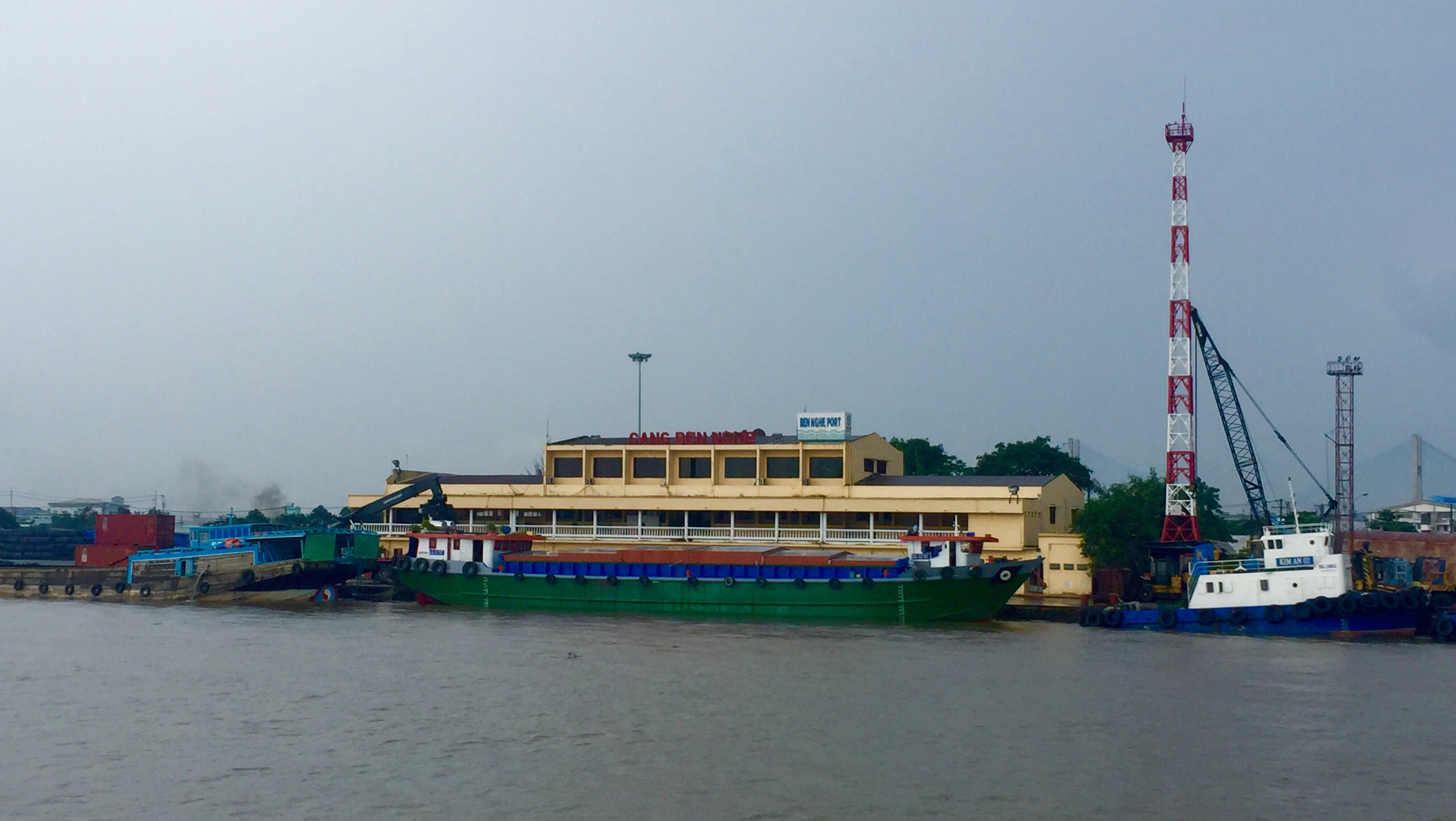
Bến Nghé Port

Tân Thuận Export Processing Zone is currently undergoing a transformation plant; high-tech companies are gradually clustering in the area, forming what is known as the Tân Thuận High-Tech Sub-zone (Tiểu Khu Công nghệ cao Tân Thuận), contrast with the Saigon Hi-Tech Park. This area is a hub for information technology companies and data centers, such as: FPT Corporation, VNPT IDC Tân Thuận, VNG Corporation, MiTek, CMC. By 2041, the site is expected to become a science park.
