= Exo Planet 6 – Exhorizon =

2026 concert tour by Exo

- Asia tour by Exo
- Location: Asia
- Associated albums: Reverxe
- Start date: April 10, 2026
- End date: July 26, 2026
- No. of shows: 30

Exo concert chronology
- Exo Planet 5 – Exploration (2019); Exo Planet 6 – Exhorizon (2026)

Exo Planet #6 – Exhorizon (stylized as EXO PLANET #6 – EXhOrizon) was the sixth concert tour by the South Korean-Chinese boy band Exo. The tour was announced on January 28, 2026, and began on April 10–12, in South Korea and concluded on July 26, in Singapore. The tour supported their eighth studio album Reverxe.

== Background ==
On January 28, 2026, SM Entertainment announced Exo's sixth world tour. The tour will begin on April 10, 11 and 12 at KSPO Dome, Seoul, South Korea, and then proceed to other countries in Asia.

== Tour dates ==
List of concerts, showing date, city, country, venue, attendance, and gross revenue
Date	City	Country	Venue	Attendance	Revenue
April 10, 2026	Seoul	South Korea	KSPO Dome	32,000	—
April 11, 2026	Seoul	South Korea	KSPO Dome	32,000	—
April 12, 2026	Seoul	South Korea	KSPO Dome	32,000	—
April 25, 2026	Ho Chi Minh City	Vietnam	Saigon Exhibition and Convention Center	20,000	—
May 2, 2026	Nagoya	Japan	Nippon Gaishi Hall	—	—
May 3, 2026	Nagoya	Japan	Nippon Gaishi Hall	—	—
May 9, 2026	Taipei	Taiwan	Taipei Arena	22,000	$3,451,771
May 10, 2026	Taipei	Taiwan	Taipei Arena	22,000	$3,451,771
May 16, 2026	Bangkok	Thailand	Impact Arena	—	—
May 17, 2026	Bangkok	Thailand	Impact Arena	—	—
May 22, 2026	Macau	China	Galaxy Arena	—	—
May 23, 2026	Macau	China	Galaxy Arena	—	—
June 2, 2026	Osaka	Japan	Osaka-jo Hall	—	—
June 3, 2026	Osaka	Japan	Osaka-jo Hall	—	—
June 6, 2026	Jakarta	Indonesia	Indonesia Arena	—	—
June 7, 2026	Jakarta	Indonesia	Indonesia Arena	—	—
June 13, 2026	Hong Kong	China	AsiaWorld–Arena	—	—
June 14, 2026	Hong Kong	China	AsiaWorld–Arena	—	—
June 20, 2026	Kuala Lumpur	Malaysia	National Hockey Stadium	15,000	—
July 4, 2026	Manila	Philippines	SM Mall of Asia Arena	—	—
July 5, 2026	Manila	Philippines	SM Mall of Asia Arena	—	—
July 11, 2026	Tokyo	Japan	LaLa Arena Tokyo Bay	—	—
July 12, 2026	Tokyo	Japan	LaLa Arena Tokyo Bay	—	—
July 18, 2026	Kaohsiung	Taiwan	Kaohsiung Arena	—	—
July 26, 2026	Singapore		Singapore Indoor Stadium	—	—
Total				N/A	—
