= Ho Chi Minh City–Trung Luong Expressway =

Road in Vietnam

Ho Chi Minh City – Trung Lương Expressway
- Đường cao tốc Thành phố Hồ Chí Minh – Trung Lương
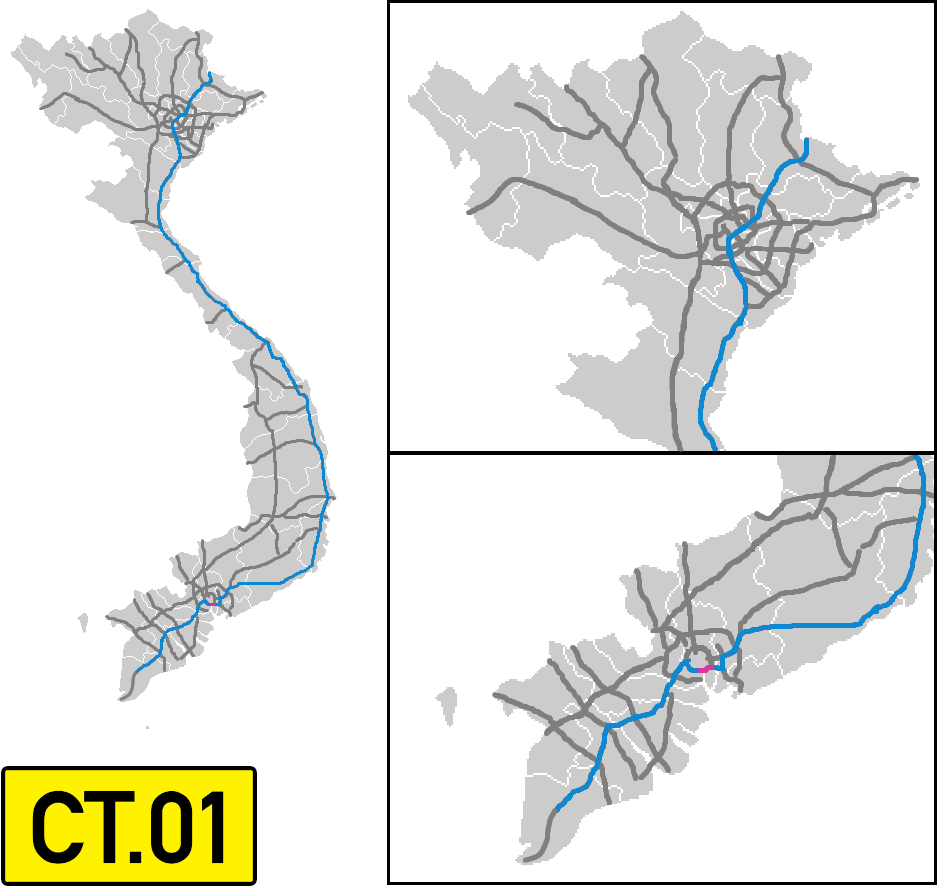
- Location of Ho Chi Minh City – Trung Lương Expressway
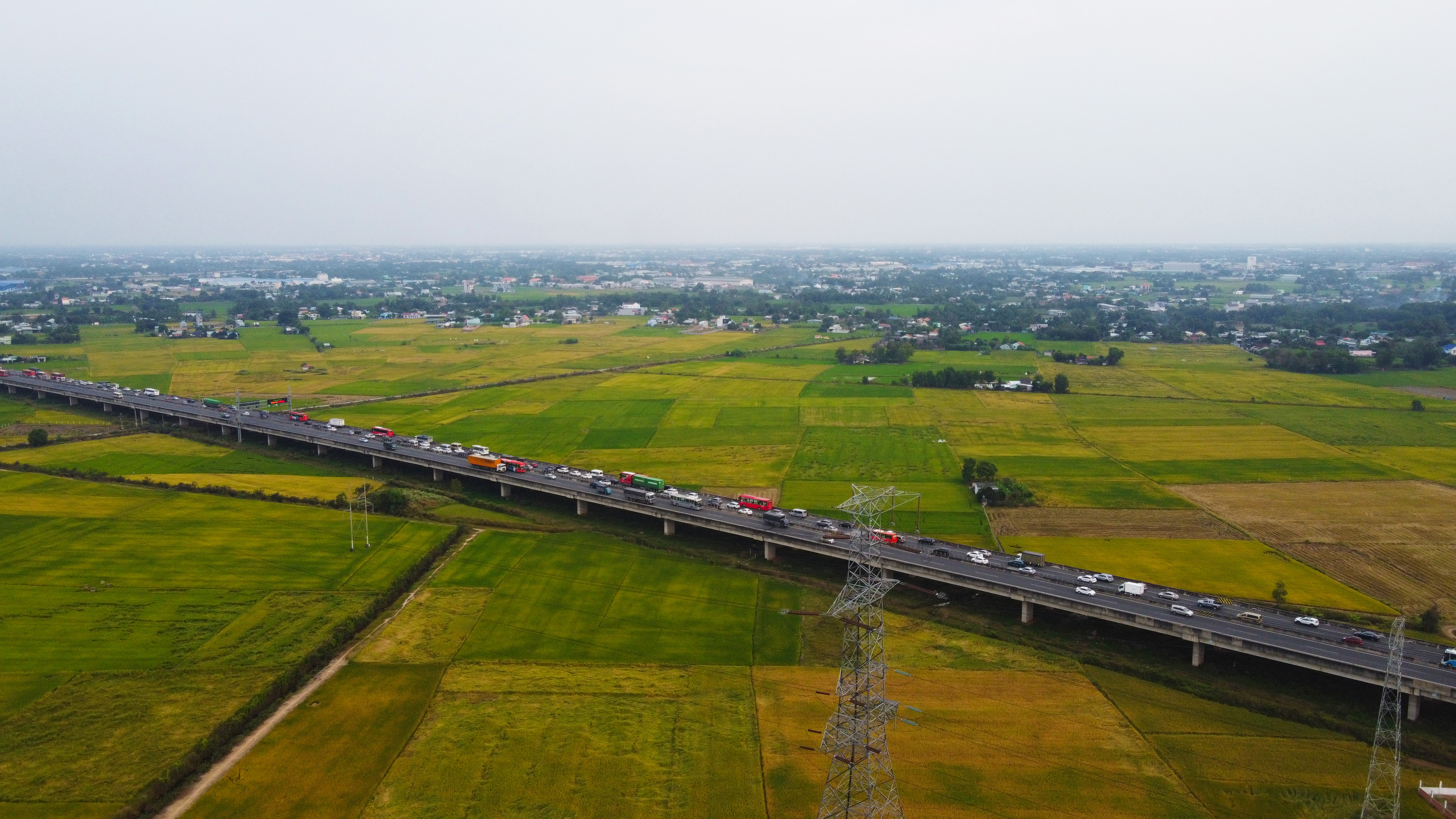
- Chợ Đệm – Bến Lức viaduct on the route at Bến Lức, Long An

Route information
- Length: 61.9 km (38.5 mi)
- Existed: February 3, 2010–present

Major junctions
- West end: Thân Cửu Nghĩa Intersection at Châu Thành District, Tiền Giang
- Ben Luc – Long Thanh Expressway at IC Mỹ Yên near Gò Đen, Bến Lức District, Long An province at Tân An, Long An
- East end: at Chợ Đệm Interchange (Note: If the Bình Thuận – Chợ Đệm Road leading to the expressway from Nguyễn Văn Linh Parkway is included), Tân Túc, Bình Chánh District, Ho Chi Minh City

Location
- Country: Vietnam

Highway system
- Transport in Vietnam

The Ho Chi Minh City–Trung Luong Expressway (part of the North–South Expressway, labelled as CT.01, from Mỹ Yên Interchange), is a 61.9-kilometre-long (38.5 mi) highway in Vietnam. This six-lane expressway opened on February 3, 2010, connecting Ho Chi Minh City with Tiền Giang Province (now Đồng Tháp province) and the rest of Mekong Delta.

The expressway starts at Tân Tạo Interchange, Bình Tân, Ho Chi Minh City and ends at Thân Cửu Nghĩa Intersection, Long Hưng, Đồng Tháp (formerly Châu Thành district, Tiền Giang province), northwest suburb of Mỹ Tho. There are four entrances to the expressway. The fastest allowed speed is 120 kilometres per hour (75 mph) and the slowest is 60 kilometres per hour (37 mph).

== Traffic ==
- Motorbikes are banned on the highway.
- For vehicles like cars, trucks, buses, coaches, the fastest allowed speed is 120 kilometres per hour (75 mph), slowest is 60 kilometres per hour (37 mph) at the lane near the raised pavement marker. For the lane near the shoulder, the fastest allowed speed is 80 kilometres per hour (50 mph) and slowest is 50 kilometres per hour (31 mph).

== Route details ==
Speed information table

=== Lanes ===
- 4 lanes + 2 shoulder
- Passenger vehicles with more than 29 seats and trucks with a payload exceeding 7.5 tonnes are prohibited from traveling in Lane 1 (adjacent to the median strip), except when overtaking other vehicles.

=== Length ===
- Total length: 41 km (25 mi)

=== Speed limit ===
- Lane 1: Max 100 km/h (62 mph), Min 80 km/h (50 mph)
- Lane 2: Max 100 km/h (62 mph), Min 60 km/h (37 mph)

== Maintenance ==
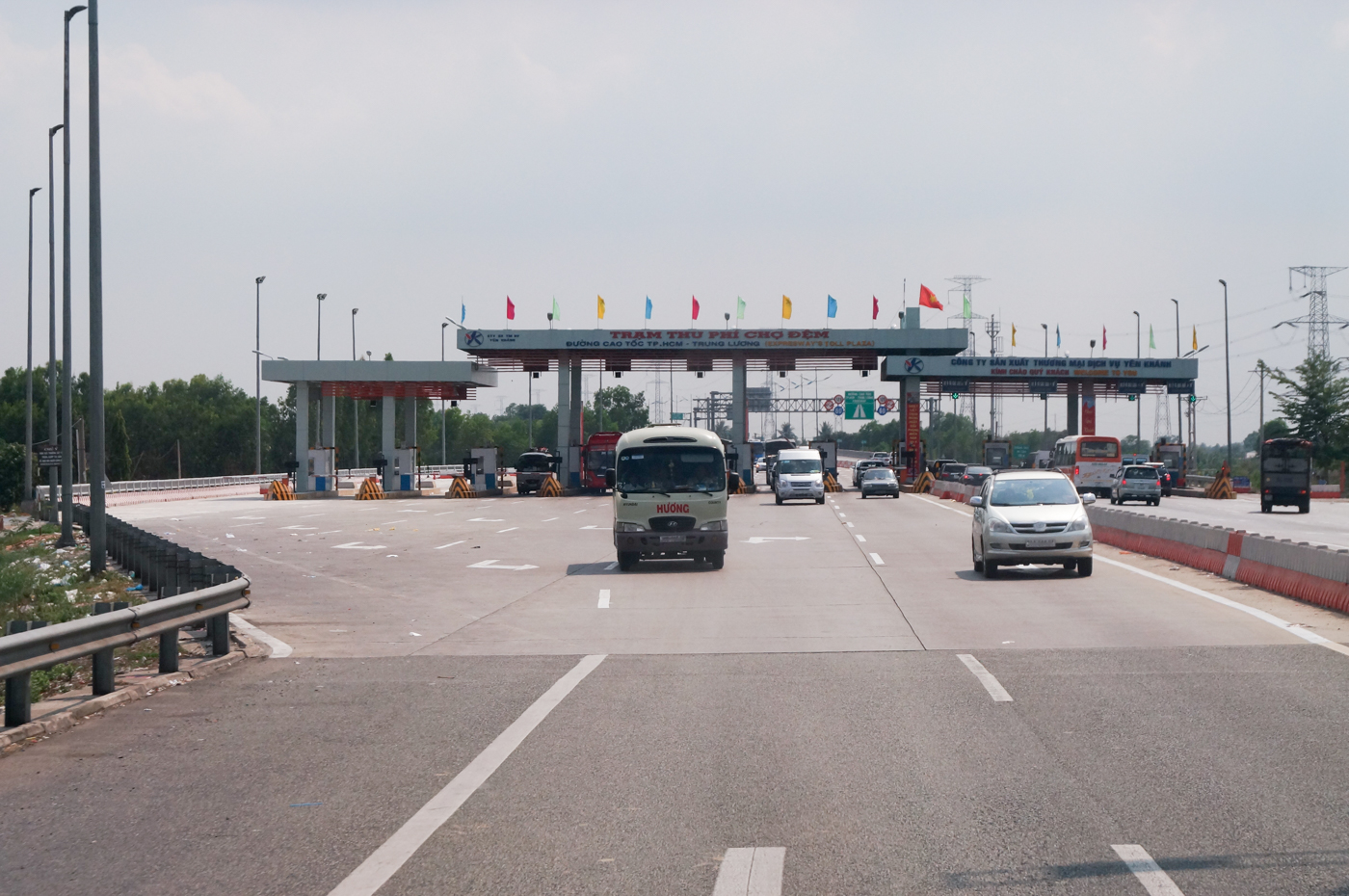
Chợ Đệm Tollgate at the east end, Bình Chánh, Ho Chi Minh City

Ministry of Transport issued Decision 819/QĐ-BGTVT on April 6, 2012, regarding the management of maintenance and servicing for the Ho Chi Minh City – Trung Luong Expressway; subsequently, the Directorate for Roads of Vietnam issued a decision assigning the task of assuming management of the expressway's maintenance to Road Management Region VII.

Effective June 1, 2012, the investor of the Ho Chi Minh City – Trung Luong Expressway officially handed over the route to Road Management Zone VII for the organization of its management, maintenance, and operation.

Road Management Zone VII stated that while it has assumed responsibility for managing the route, it has not yet taken over the existing conditions of the infrastructure itself. Road Company 715—the entity temporarily assigned to directly handle the route's management and maintenance—reported that the monthly cost for these operations is approximately 3 billion VND.

== List of interchanges & features ==
- IC: Interchange, JCT: Junction, SA: Service area (Rest area), TG: Tollgate, TN: Tunnel, BR: Bridge
- The unit of distance is km.

No.	Name	Dist. from origin (Note: The distance is based on the actual highway alignment, measured from the National Highway 1 – Võ Trần Chí Road interchange in Tân Tạo)	Connections	Notes	Location	
Connect with National Route 1 via Võ Trần Chí Road or Bình Thuận - Chợ Đệm Road
1	IC Chợ Đệm	9	Võ Trần Chí Road; Bình Thuận – Chợ Đệm Road	The starting point of the expressway does not include the Võ Trần Chí Road	Ho Chi Minh City	Tân Nhựt
TG	Chợ Đệm Tollgate	10.5		Temporarily suspended	Ho Chi Minh City	Tân Nhựt
2	IC Mỹ Yên	12.7	Ben Luc – Long Thanh Expressway; Ring Road 3 (Ho Chi Minh City)	Under construction	Tây Ninh province	Mỹ Yên
3	IC Bến Lức	20	Provincial road 830	Connect with Ring Road 4 (Ho Chi Minh City)	Tây Ninh province	Bến Lức
BR	Bến Lức Bridge	↓		Passes Vàm Cỏ Đông River	Tây Ninh province	Bến Lức – Bình Đức Boundary
SA	Rest area	28.3			Tây Ninh province	Thủ Thừa
BR	Tân An Bridge	↓		Passes Vàm Cỏ Tây River	Tây Ninh province	Long An – Khánh Hậu Boundary
4	IC Tân An	36.6	National Route 62		Tây Ninh province	Khánh Hậu
5	IC Thân Cửu Nghĩa	50	Provincial road 878		Đồng Tháp province	Long Hưng
Connect directly to Trung Luong – My Thuan Expressway
1.000 mi = 1.609 km; 1.000 km = 0.621 mi: Closed/former; Proposed; Incomplete access; Route transition; Unopened
