= Phú Mỹ Bridge =

Bridge in Vietnam

Phú Mỹ Bridge Cầu Phú Mỹ
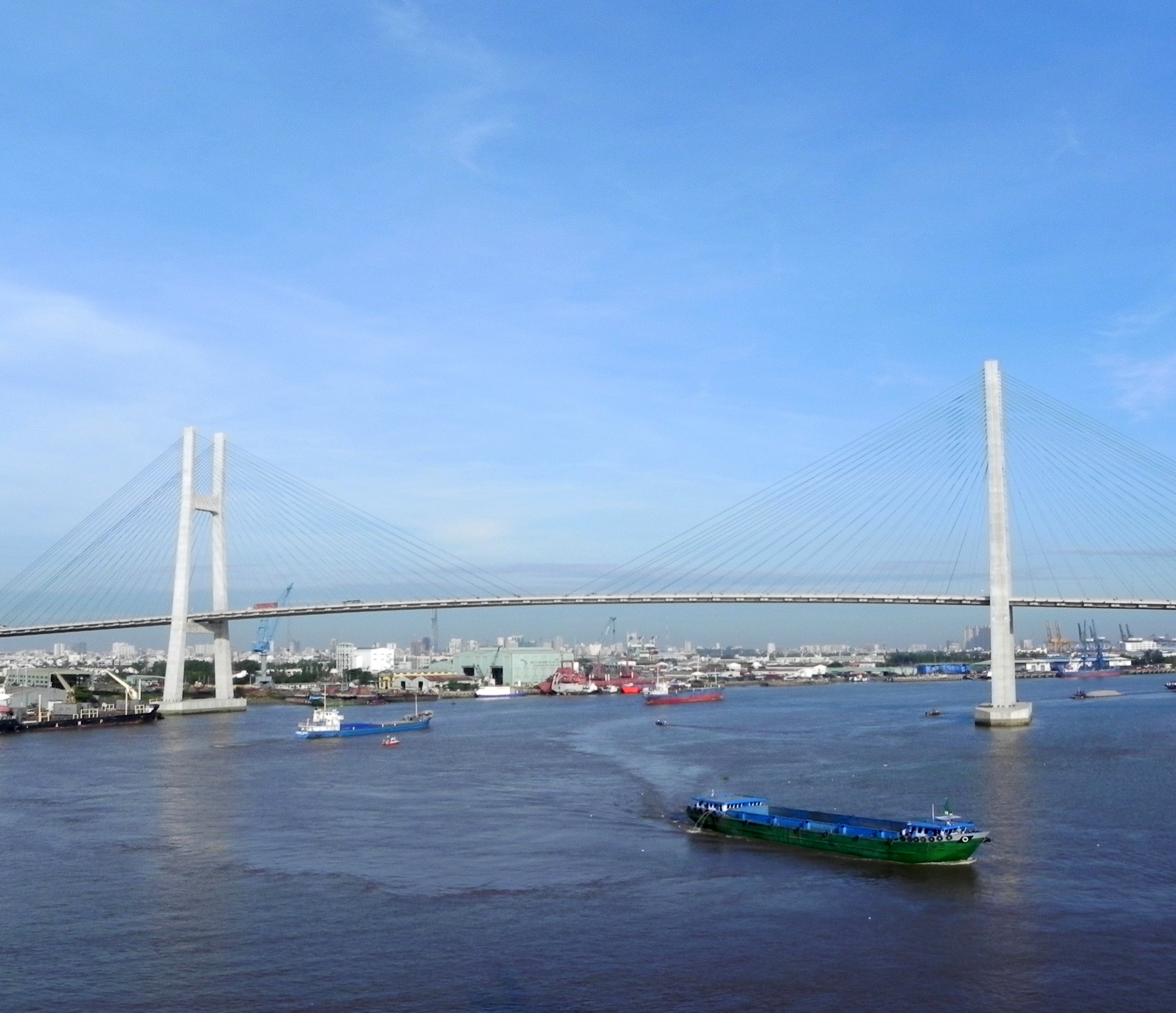
- Coordinates: 10°44′41.97″N 106°44′40.04″E
- Carries: Motor vehicles, pedestrians and motorists
- Crosses: Saigon River
- Locale: Ho Chi Minh City, Vietnam
- Official name: Cầu Phú Mỹ
- Maintained by: Phu My Bridge Corporation (PMC)

Characteristics
- Design: Cable-stayed bridge
- Material: Concrete
- Total length: 2,100 metres (6,900 ft)
- Width: 27 metres (89 ft)
- Height: 145 metres (476 ft)
- Longest span: 380 metres (1,250 ft)
- Piers in water: 2
- Clearance below: 45 metres (148 ft)

History
- Constructed by: Baulderstone, Bilfinger Berger, Freyssinet joint venture
- Construction start: 9 September 2005
- Opened: 9 September 2009

Location
- Interactive map of Phú Mỹ Bridge

The Phú Mỹ Bridge (Vietnamese: Cầu Phú Mỹ) is a cable-stayed road bridge over the Saigon River in Ho Chi Minh City, Vietnam.

The bridge was constructed from March 2007 to September 2009 by a consortium consisting of Baulderstone, Bilfinger Berger, Freyssinet (cable stays and stressing), and the Vietnamese company CC620 (concrete, formwork, etc.) and was designed by the French consultant Arcadis (design of the main bridge) and Cardno (design of the approaches). The project manager for the project was AECOM.

The Phu My Bridge is 705 metres long across the river, with a main span of 380 metres and the approach viaduct structures on either side of the river are approximately 758m and 638m long respectively. The modified H-shaped main towers, which are 145m high, support a 27m wide main span deck. It has six lanes of traffic; two lanes of vehicle traffic in each direction, and a separate lane for motorbikes and pedestrian footways. The bridge will connect District 2 on the north side of the river to District 7 and forms part of a new ring road currently being built around the south and east of Ho Chi Minh City.

The bridge was officially opened to traffic in a ceremony attended by the Prime Minister of Vietnam, Nguyễn Tấn Dũng, along with other Vietnamese and Australian government officials, on 2 September 2009.

Phu My Bridge Corporation (PMC) has a thirty-year BOT licence to operate the bridge which will be part of a toll road. PMC is a private consortium comprising Hanoi Construction Company, Investco, Cienco 620, Thanh Danh Co, and CII. The project was privately financed by PMC along with export credit guarantees from Germany, France and Australia. As part of the financing arrangements almost half of the contract expenditure must be in these three countries. These three aspects of the project (private sector infrastructure, private sector BOT scheme, and export credit finance) are all firsts for Vietnam.
