= Bình Chánh =

Bình Chánh Xã Bình Chánh
- Commune
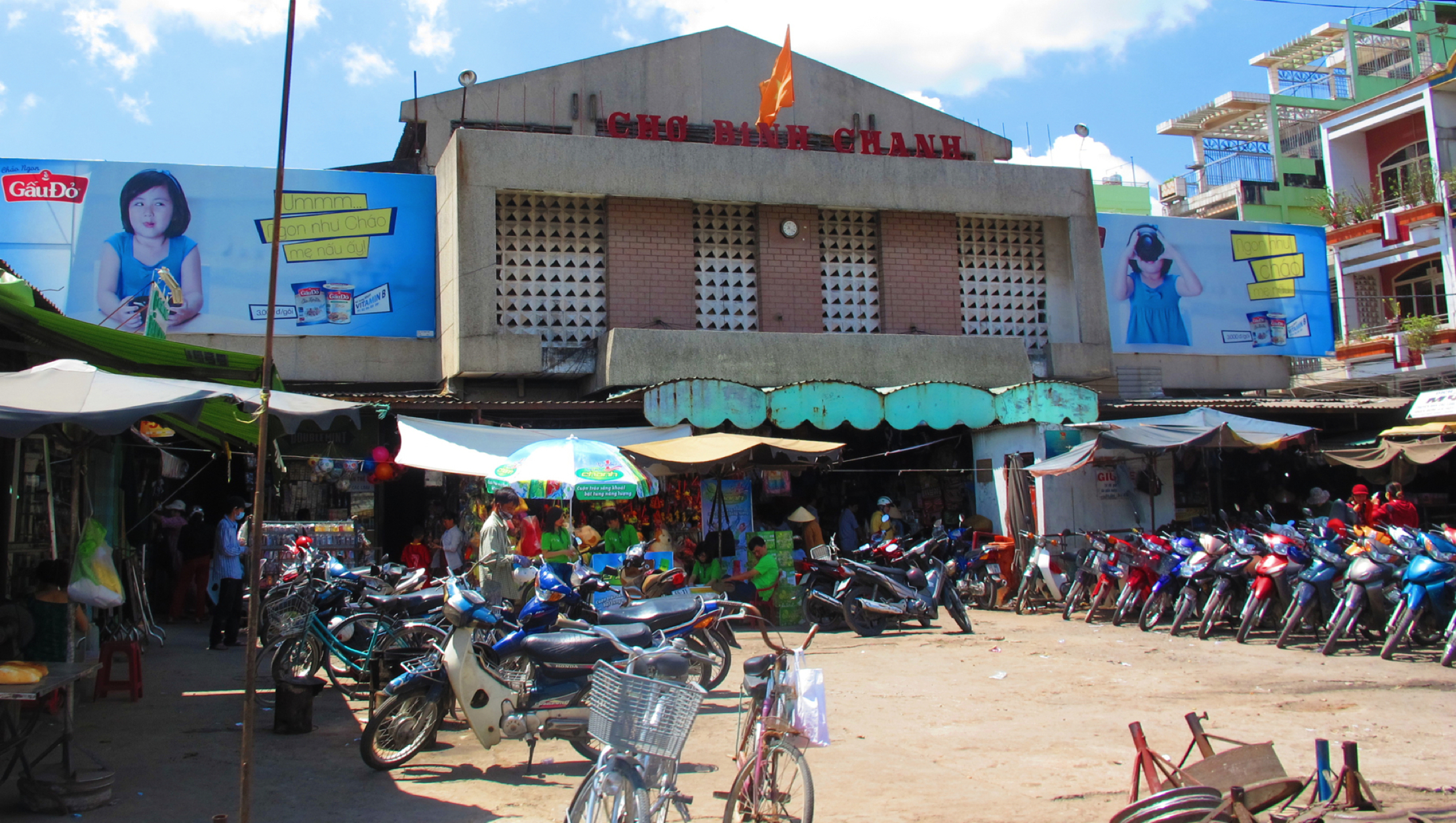
- Bình Chánh Market
- Interactive map of Bình Chánh
- Coordinates: 10°39′50″N 106°34′13″E
- Country: Vietnam
- Municipality: Ho Chi Minh City
- Established: June 16, 2025

Area
  - Total: 8.24 sq mi (21.33 km^{2})

Population (2024)
  - Total: 76,187
  - Density: 9,251/sq mi (3,572/km^{2})
- Time zone: UTC+07:00 (Indochina Time)
- Administrative code: 27637

Bình Chánh (Vietnamese: Xã Bình Chánh) is a commune of Ho Chi Minh City, Vietnam. It is one of the 168 new wards, communes and special zones of the city following the reorganization in 2025.

== History ==
On June 16, 2025, the National Assembly Standing Committee issued Resolution No. 1685/NQ-UBTVQH15 on the arrangement of commune-level administrative units of Ho Chi Minh City in 2025 (effective from June 16, 2025). Accordingly, the entire land area and population of Bình Chánh, Tân Quý Tây communes and most of An Phú Tây commune of the former Bình Chánh district will be integrated into a new commune named Bình Chánh (Clause 117, Article 1).

== Administration ==
The ward has 23 hamlets, numbered from 1 to 23.
