= Nanjing Yuejin Soyat =

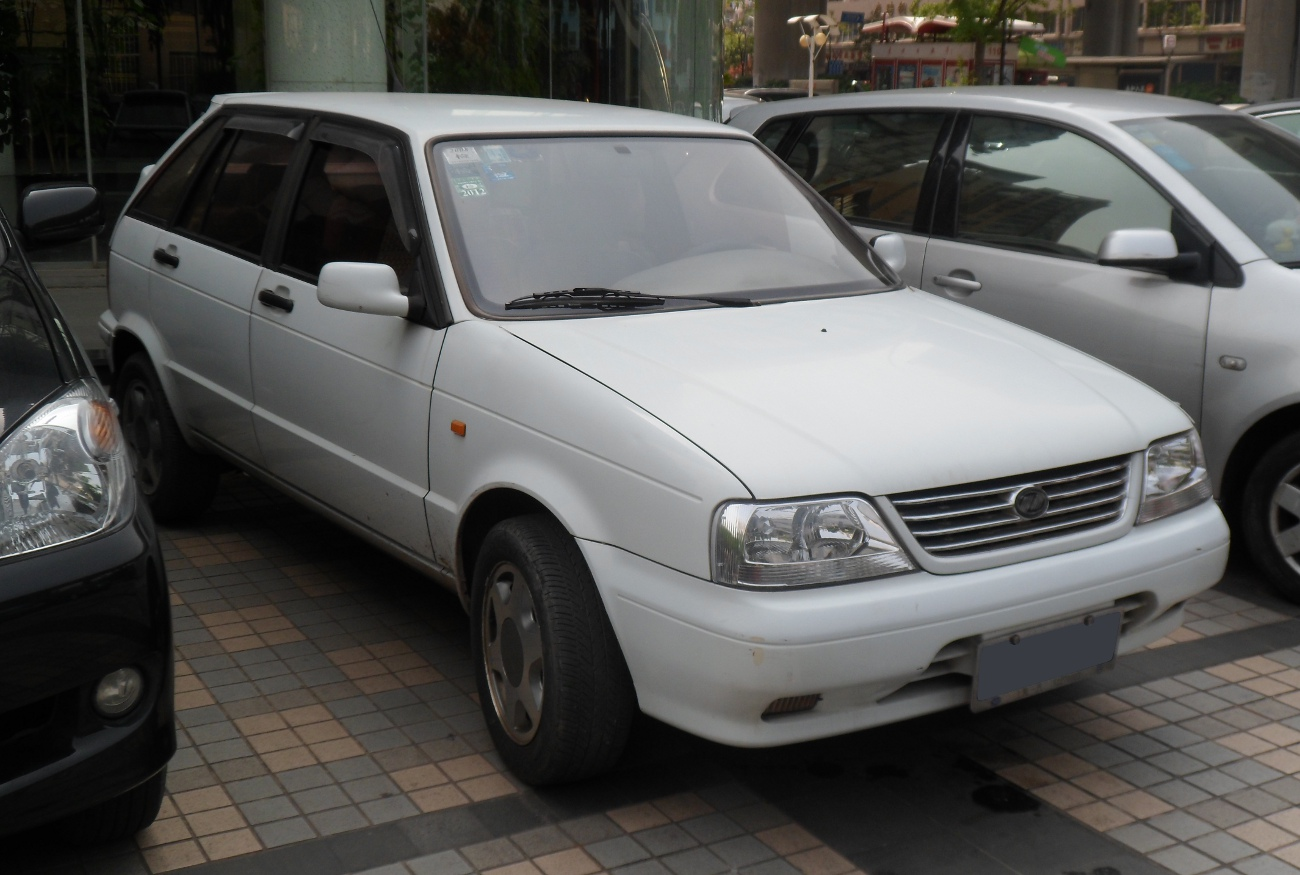
- Soyat Encore (2003-2007)

Overview
- Manufacturer: Nanjing Automobile
- Also called: Nanjing NJ6400 Encore/Nanjing NJ7150 Soyat (hatchback); Nanjing NJ1020 Unique (van)
- Production: 1999–2008

Body and chassis
- Class: Subcompact car (B)
- Body style: 5-door hatchback 4-door van
- Related: SEAT Ibiza Mk1

Powertrain
- Engine: 1.2 L I4; 1.3 L RN413EF3 I4; 1.5 L NJG415E2 I4; 2.2 L JM491Q-ME I4
- Transmission: 5 speed manual

Dimensions
- Wheelbase: 2,443 mm (96.2 in)
- Length: 3,990 mm (157.1 in)
- Width: 1,610 mm (63.4 in)
- Height: 1,394 mm (54.9 in)

The Soyat is a subcompact hatchback built by the Wuxi Soyat (南汽新雅途) branch of Nanjing Automobile (Group) Corporation. The car is based on the original 1984 ('System Porsche') version of the SEAT Ibiza Mark I (1984-1993).

== History ==
After the first generation Ibiza was replaced, the technology and production line were bought by a joint venture between Nanjing Yuejin and the Malaysian Lion Group in 1997. Production did not begin, however, until Fiat took over the Lion Group's share in Jiangsu Nanya Auto, as the company was called.

In 1999 the SEAT design was modified for the Chinese market and then rebranded as the Zhongguo Nanjing NJ6400, later as the modernized and fuel injected GHR Encore. This model continued until October 2003 when the Ibiza license expired and the design had to be updated.

In March 2004 a Chinese mobile phone manufacturer called Ningbo Bird decided that it too wanted to get into the process of car manufacture. With Ningbo Bird joining the original partners in a 50/50 relationship, the new design was renamed the Soyat. Ningbo Bird then left the company in 2005.

In addition to the five-door Soyat hatchback, a four-door tall estate (two on the right-hand side) called the Soyat Unique NJ1020 is also available, using a wider and taller rear end borrowed from the more modern SEAT Inca.

Although the car's design dates back to 1984, it proved reasonably popular. Production numbers have dropped considerably (from 4,261 in 2004 to 705 in the first eleven months of 2007,) as Nanjing's focus switched to more modern and competitive Fiats and then MGs. Engines available were originally the "System Porsche" 1.2 and 1.5-litre (70 and 86 hp), the smaller engine has since been replaced with a 1,342 cc version of Toyota origins. All engines were paired to a 5 speed manual gearbox as standard.

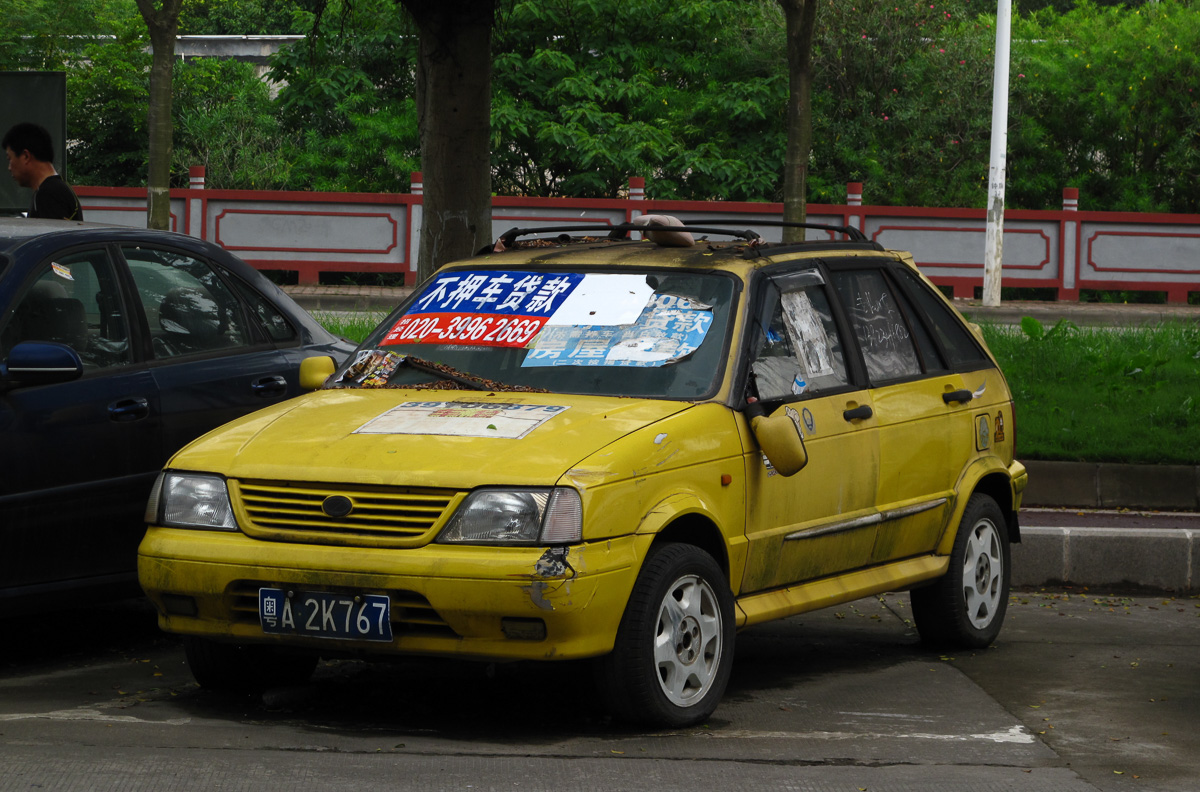
Nanjing Soyat Encore

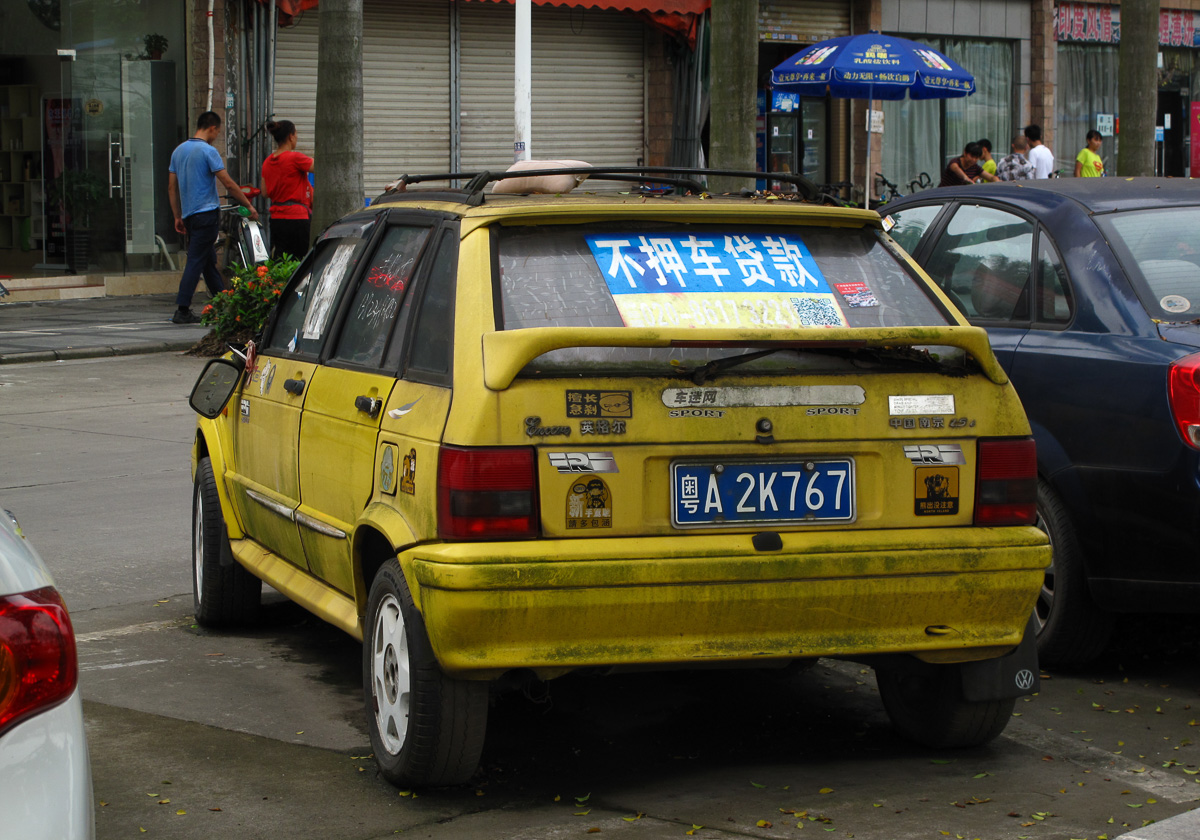
Nanjing Soyat Encore rear

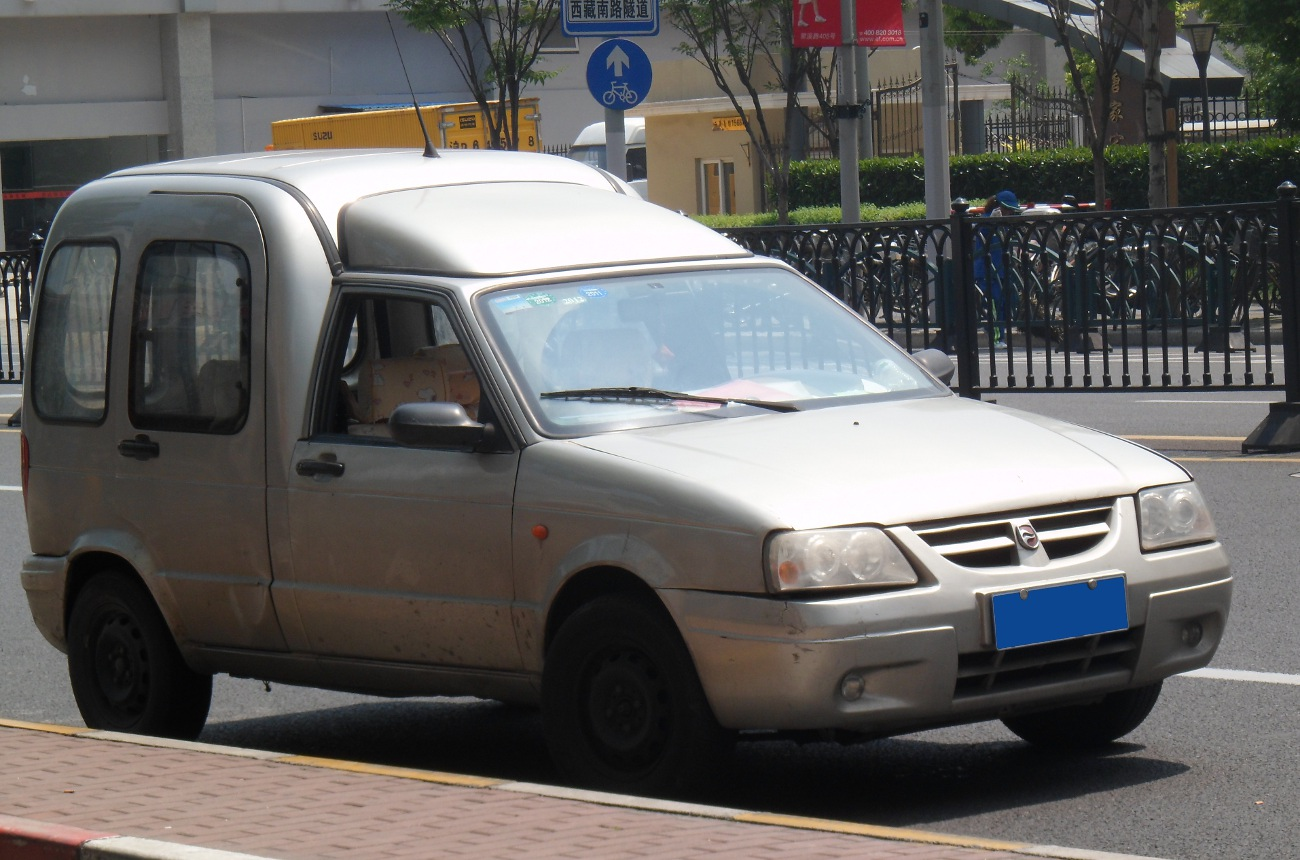
Nanjing Soyat Unique (NJ1020)

A facelifted model called NJ7150 was launched in 2004 and this was further modified in 2006 for the NJ7150B model with a new front design, but it was all for nothing and by 2008 Soyat production had ended and Nanjing's new owners SAIC closed down the Wuxi factory. The car was also noted to be reliable, cheap to maintain and cheap to buy. Pricing for the Yuejin Soyat ranged from 44,900 yuan to 48,300 yuan (6,280 to 6,760 USD).

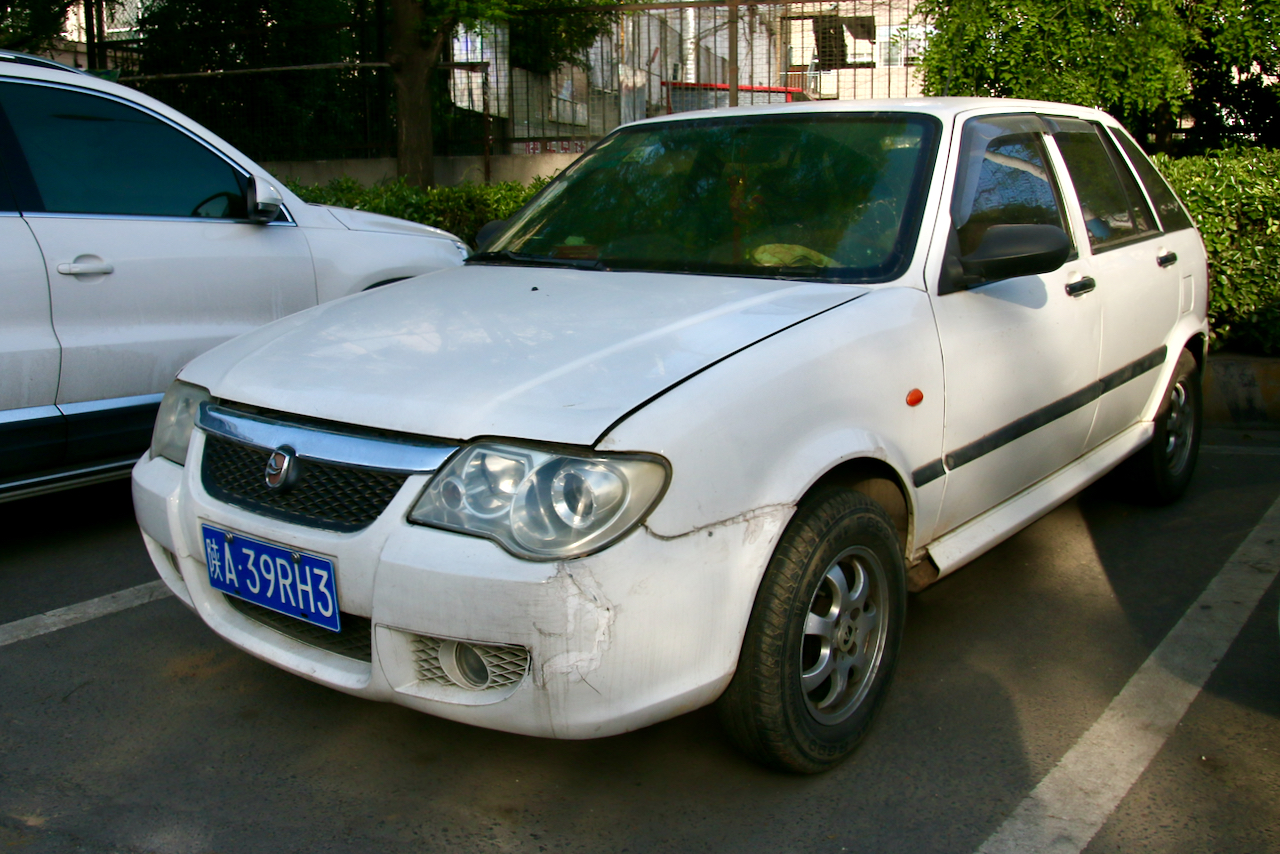
A 2007 Nanjing NJ7150B Soyat in Xi'an

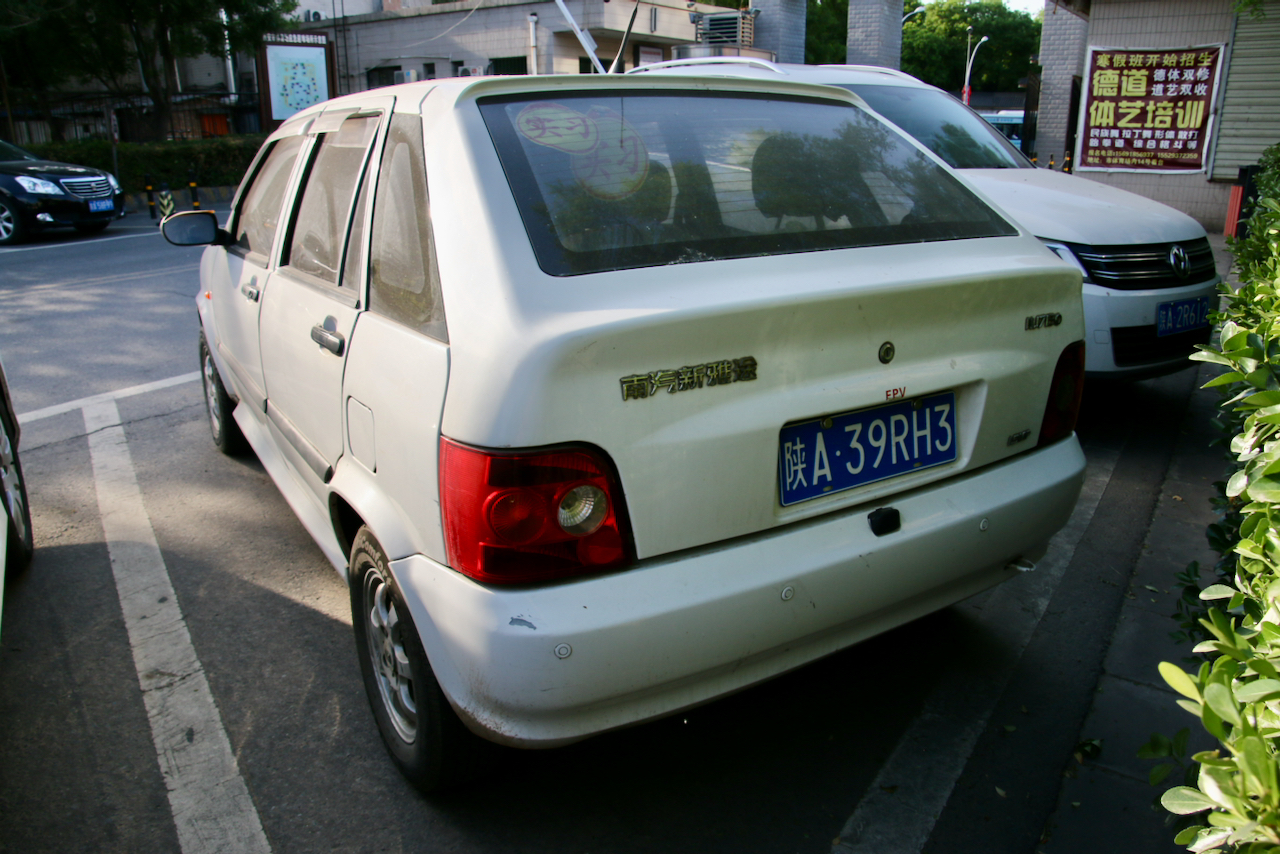
2007 Nanjing NJ7150B Soyat rear

== Models ==
- Nanjing Yuejin NJ6400 / Encore (英格尔/优尼柯, 1999 - 2003)
- Nanjing Yuejin NJ7150 Soyat (英格尔/新雅途, 2004 - 2006)
- Nanjing Yuejin NJ7150B Soyat (英格尔/新雅途, 2006 - 2008)
- Nanjing Yuejin NJ1020 Unique (优尼柯, four-door tall estate)

These models were mainly sold inside mainland China.
