= Chelsia Chan =

Hong Kong actress and singer-songwriter

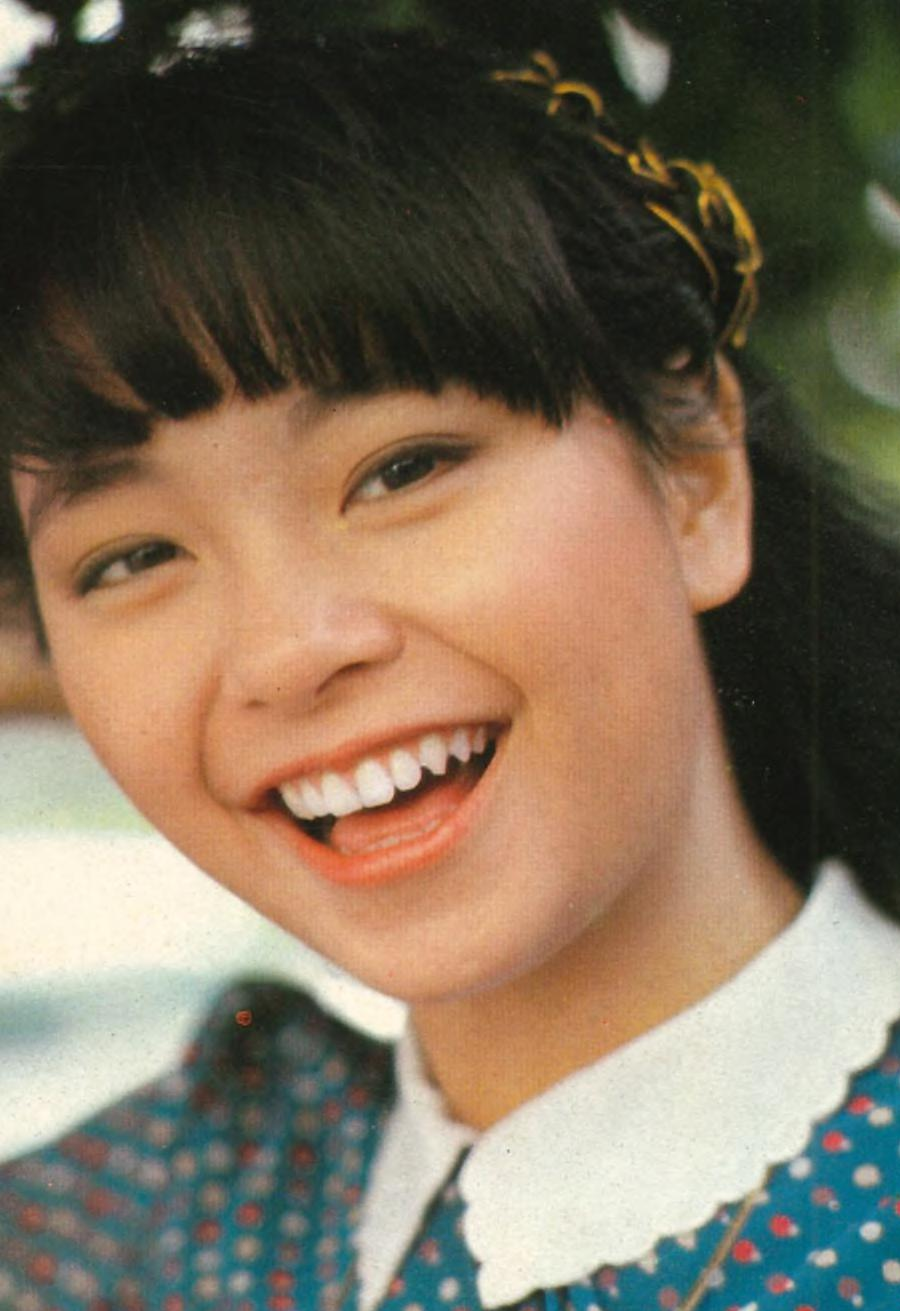
- Chan in 1979
- Born: 12 November 1957 (age 68); British Hong Kong
- Occupation: Singer
- Years active: 1974–1981, 2006–present

Chinese name
- Traditional Chinese: 陳秋霞
- Simplified Chinese: 陈秋霞
- Cantonese Yale: chàhn chāu hàh
Transcriptions
Standard Mandarin
- Hanyu Pinyin: Chén Qiūxiá
Yue: Cantonese
- Yale Romanization: chàhn chāu hàh
- Jyutping: can4 cau1 haa4
Southern Min
- Hokkien POJ: Tân Chhiu-hâ
- Tâi-lô: Tân Tshiu-hâ
- Musical career
- Origin: Hong Kong
- Genres: Hong Kong English pop, Mandopop
- Instruments: piano, vocals
- Website: chelsia-chan.com

Puan Sri Chelsia Chan, also known as Chan Chau Ha, is a Hong Kong–based actress and singer-songwriter. Chan joined the music industry after winning the first prize at an amateur creative singing contest in 1975 in Hong Kong with the English song "Dark Side of Your Mind", which she composed with lyrics provided by her then-manager Pato Leung. Later, this became one of her best remembered songs. In 1976, at the age of 19, she won the leading actress award at Taiwan's Golden Horse Film Festival for the movie "Qiu Xia" (Chelsia My Love) which incidentally is also her own birth name. She is so far the youngest winner with the shortest screen life (seven years) in the Festival's history. Chan used to sing along with the Hong Kong group, The Wynners.

Chan is married to Lion Group Chairman, Tan Sri William Cheng.

== Discography ==
Singles

- Our Last Song Together/Where Are You? (1975)
- Little Bird ~ adapted from Kaze/Are You Still Mad at Me? (1975)

Albums

- Dark Side Of Your Mind (1975)
- Chelsia My Love (1976)
- Because Of You (1977)
- Love on A foggy River (1978)
- 你不要走不要走 (1978)
- 結婚三級跳 (1979)
- 第二道彩虹 (1979)
- Fly with Love (1979)
- A Sorrowful Wedding (1979)
- Flying Home (1980)
- Poor Chasers (1980)
- 古寧頭大戰 (1980)

== Filmography ==
- Dreams of the Journey (1977)
