= Saigon Paragon =

Complex building in Ho Chi Minh City, Vietnam

- Tòa nhà Saigon Paragon, Tòa nhà Paragon
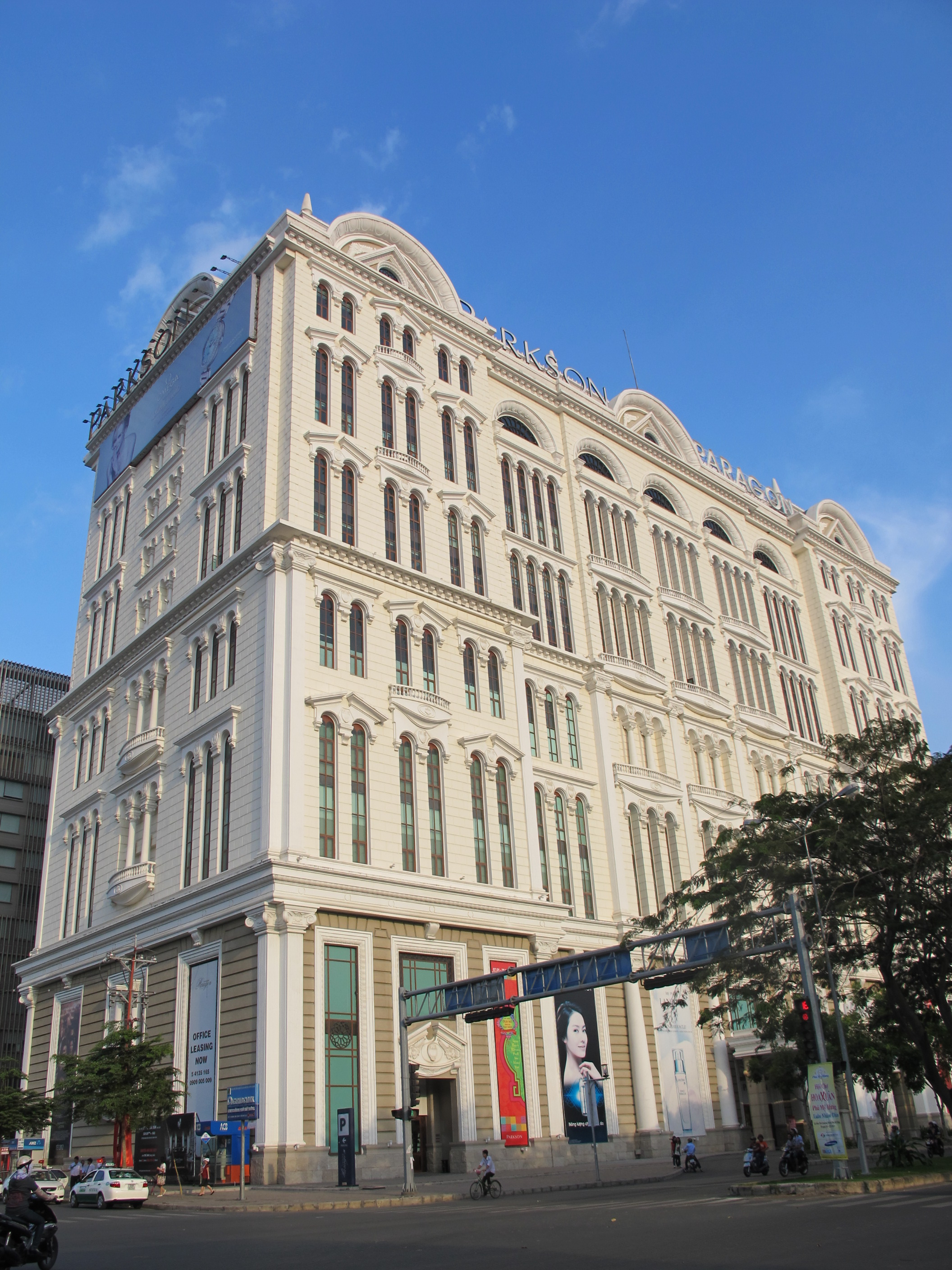
- Saigon Paragon in 2012, as it still was Parkson Paragon
- Interactive map of the Saigon Paragon area
- Former names: Parkson Paragon (2011-2016)
- Alternative names: Paragon Building

General information
- Status: Completed
- Type: Office, retail
- Architectural style: New Classiccal
- Location: Block C5, International Commercial & Financial District, Phú Mỹ Hưng urban area, No. 3 Nguyễn Lương Bằng Avenue, Tân Phú, District 7, Ho Chi Minh City, Vietnam
- Coordinates: 10°43′46″N 106°43′19″E
- Construction started: July 21, 2005; 20 years ago
- Completed: Q1/2009
- Inaugurated: June 27, 2009; 17 years ago
- Cost: US$35 million
- Landlord: Khaisilk, Thủy Lộc

Height
- Top floor: 10

Technical details
- Floor count: 11
- Floor area: 41,000 m^{2} (441,320 sq ft)
- Lifts/elevators: 6 by Schindler

Design and construction
- Architect: Katsuki Katsunori
- Developer: Paragon Corporation

Other information
- Parking: 2 basements
- Public transit: L11 Unknown station (proposed); Bus: D3, 34, 68, 102, 139

The Saigon Paragon Building or simply known as Paragon Building is a commercial complex building for offices (major) and shopping centre in Ho Chi Minh City, Vietnam. It is located at No. 3 Nguyễn Lương Bằng Avenue, Tân Phú Ward, District 7 (now is Tân Mỹ Ward), in the International Commercial & Financial District (Khu Thương mại và Tài chính Quốc tế) of Phú Mỹ Hưng urban area. It was the first office building in Phú Mỹ Hưng to be inarguated through Paragon Coroporation, a joint-venture between two corporations of Khaisilk and Thủy Lộc.

The tower has 10 floors (the 3rd floor is divided into Level 3 and 3A) with 2 basements for parking. In its pre-COVID-19 period, the lower floors (1 to 4) are home to various luxury retail stores, while the upper floors (6 to 9) are used for office space, and the 10th floor is for convention center. A food court and supermarket are located in the basement, and a MegaStar Cineplex Saigon Paragon cinema (later renamed as CGV Cinemas as MegaStar merged into CGV) is located on the 5th floor. In the period between 2011 and 2016, the building was named Parkson Paragon, as Parkson hired and operated their department store in the building and planned to change the building name for 19 years but it was shuttered just after 5 years. Currently, the building is major used for office leasing, retail area is now only around the 1st floor and B1.
