= Wuling Yangguang Pro =

Battery electric van

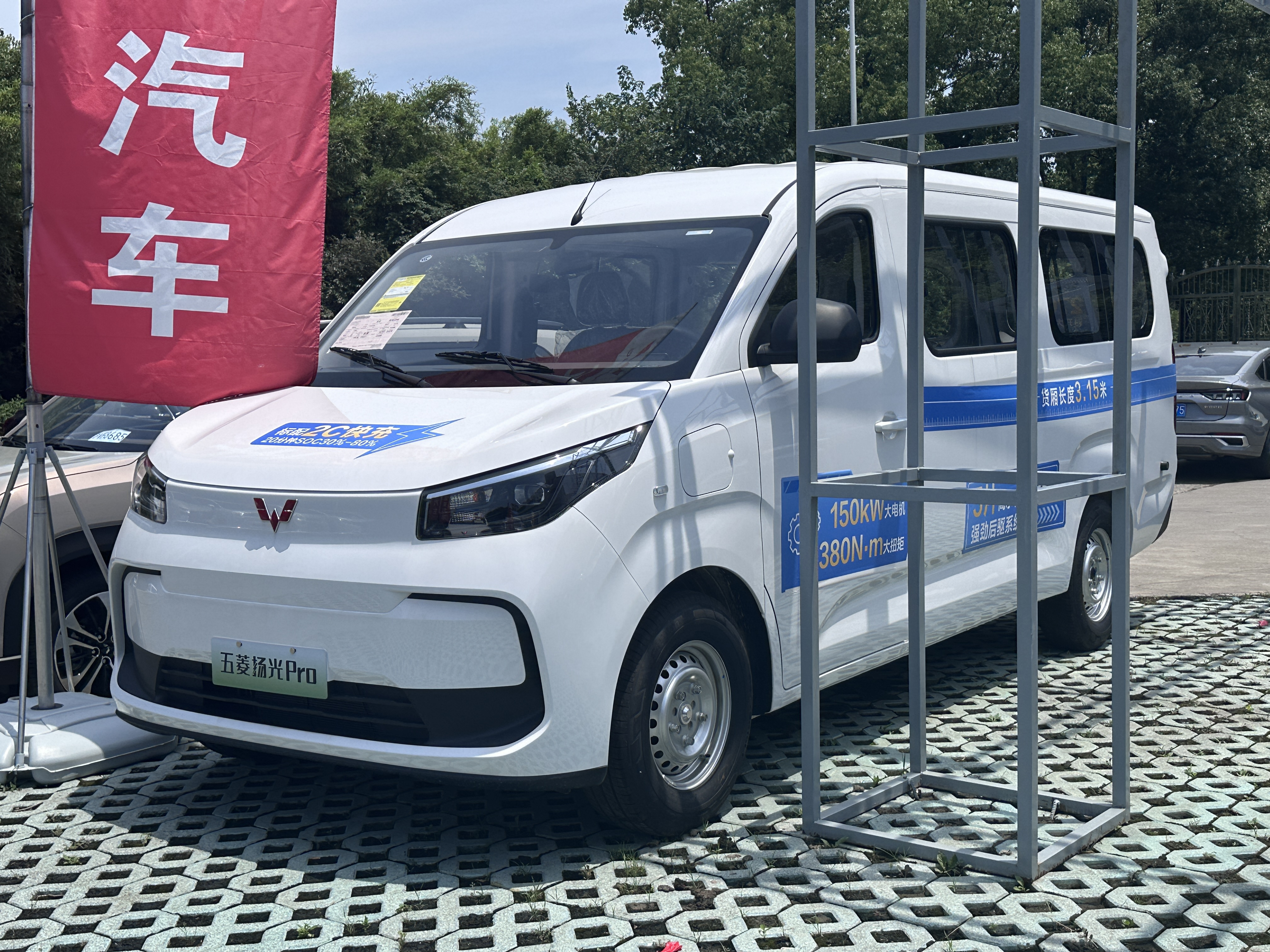
- Wuling Yangguang Pro (EV)

Overview
- Manufacturer: SAIC-GM-Wuling
- Also called: Iveco Lingsheng V100
- Production: 2026–present
- Assembly: China: Liuzhou, Guangxi

Body and chassis
- Class: Light commercial vehicle
- Body style: 5-door van
- Layout: Rear-motor, rear-wheel-drive

Powertrain
- Electric motor: Permanent magnet synchronous
- Power output: 150kW
- Battery: 31.9 kWh LFP Rept Battero (EREV); 54.5 kWh LFP Sunwoda; 69.2 kWh LFP Rept Battero; 66.67 kWh LFP Tectrans CATL
- Electric range: 318–405 km (198–252 mi) (EV, CLTC); 101 km (63 mi) (EREV, WLTP); 150 km (93 mi) (EREV, CLTC)

Dimensions
- Wheelbase: 3,450 mm (135.8 in)
- Length: 5,495 mm (216.3 in)
- Width: 1,999 mm (78.7 in)
- Height: 2,170 mm (85.4 in)
- Curb weight: 1,481–1,551 kg (3,265–3,419 lb)

The Wuling Yangguang Pro (Chinese: 五菱扬光PRO) is a battery electric and range-extended light commercial van manufactured by SAIC-GM-Wuling (SGMW) since 2026 under the Wuling brand.

== Overview ==
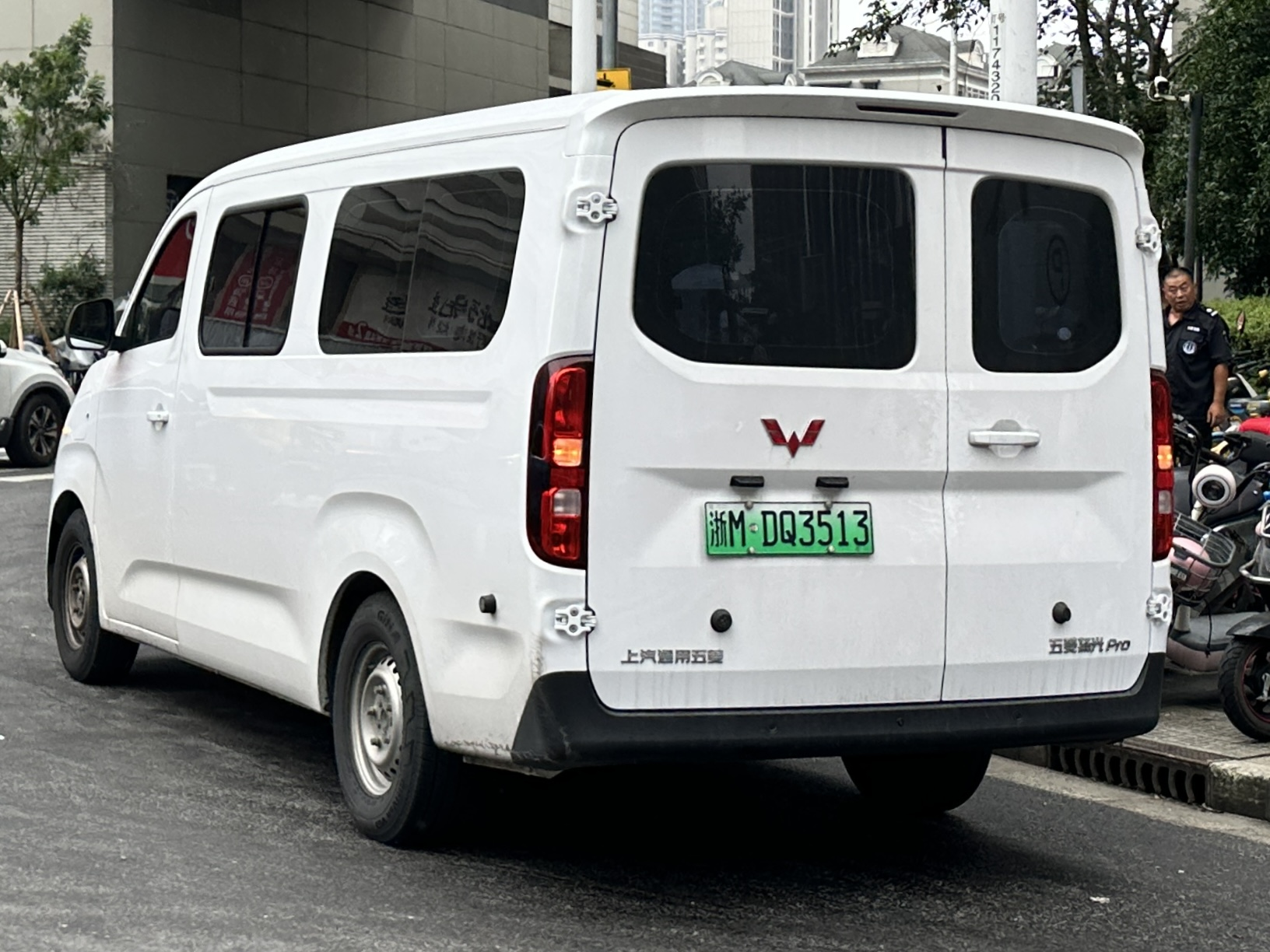
Rear view

The Yangguang Pro is a fully electric large urban logistics van with a capacity of 9-cubic-meter. Designed following the "Auspicious Beast" design language with aerodynamic efficiency in mind, the drag coefficient of the Yangguang Pro is 0.325. It was launched in July 2026.

The Yangguang Pro product range includes a 318 km (198 mi)-range open window passenger van, a 380 km (236 mi)-range panel van, a 405 km (252 mi)-range open window passenger van, a 405 km (252 mi)-range 9-seater business van, and a 365 km (227 mi)-range customized panel van developed in collaboration with CATL with the "Ningde Tianxing" (宁德时代 天行电池) battery variant. The models are offered in four range options: 318 km (198 mi), 365 km (227 mi), 380 km (236 mi), and 405 km (252 mi), and all variants are powered by a rear positioned 150 kW electric motor producing a maximum torque of 380 N·m.

== Range extended variant ==
Wuling Yangguang Pro (EREV)

The range extended variant of the Yangguang Pro is equipped with Wuling's Lingxi (灵犀) extended range hybrid powertrain. It is equipped with a transverse-mounted 1.5-liter turbocharged inline-4 petrol engine outputting 134 hp (100 kW; 136 PS) (141 hp (105 kW; 143 PS) gross); it uses a cast iron block and aluminium heads, and Wuling says its the only direct-injected engine in its class and has a peak thermal efficiency of 39.3%. It is equipped with a rear motor outputting 147 hp (110 kW; 149 PS) and 280 N⋅m (207 lb⋅ft) of torque, with power supplied by a 31.9 kWh Shenlian (神炼) LFP battery providing an electric range of 101 kilometres (63 mi) WLTP or 150 kilometres (93 mi) CLTC, which can be recharged from 30–80% in 15 minutes for 2C charging. It is equipped with a 55-liter (14.5 U.S. gal) petrol tank for a total combined range of 850 kilometres (528 mi).

== Specifications ==
Yangguang Pro
Engine	Battery		Power	Torque	Electric range	30–80% charge time	Top speed	Kerb weight
Engine	Type	Weight	Power	Torque	CLTC	30–80% charge time	Top speed	Kerb weight
1.5L LBT Turbo I4	31.9 kWh LFP REPT	250 kg (551 lb)	147 hp (110 kW; 149 PS)	280 N⋅m (207 lb⋅ft)	150 km (93 mi)	15 min	120 km/h (75 mph)	2,155 kg (4,751 lb)
N/A	54.5 kWh LFP Sunwoda	387 kg (853 lb)	201 hp (150 kW; 204 PS)	380 N⋅m (280 lb⋅ft)	318 km (198 mi)	20 min	100 km/h (62 mph)	2,015 kg (4,442 lb)
N/A	66.67 kWh LFP CATL		201 hp (150 kW; 204 PS)	380 N⋅m (280 lb⋅ft)	365 km (227 mi)	20 min	100 km/h (62 mph)	2,035 kg (4,486 lb)
N/A	69.2 kWh LFP REPT	463 kg (1,021 lb)	201 hp (150 kW; 204 PS)	380 N⋅m (280 lb⋅ft)	380–405 km (236–252 mi)	20 min	100 km/h (62 mph)	2,035–2,155 kg (4,486–4,751 lb)

== Iveco Lingsheng V100 ==
A rebadged electric variant of the Wuling Yangguang Pro called the Iveco Lingsheng (领胜) V100 was launched in the Chinese market in October 2026. Sold under the Naveco branding, the Lingsheng V100 features restyled front bumper and grilles. The Lingsheng V100 is powered by a rear positioned electric motor producing 150kW and 380N·m with a CLTC range of 376km.
