= Lion Group =

Conglomerate company of Malaysia

Lion Group Management Services Sdn Bhd
- Type: Private Limited Company
- Headquarters: Level 11 - 15, Lion Office Tower, No. 1, Jalan Nagasari, 50200 Kuala Lumpur, Malaysia
- Key people: William Cheng, Chairman
- Website: www.liongroup.com.my

Lion Group Malaysia is a Malaysian company, whose chairman and chief executive officer is William Cheng. Cheng's grandfather founded Lion as a small trading company in Singapore after leaving China in the 1920s. It became Malaysia's biggest steel manufacturer after winning a license from the government in 1978. One of the group's biggest investments is Suzuki Assemblers Malaysia Sdn Bhd which manufactures Suzuki motorcycles for the Malaysian market. Between 1997 and 1999 they were also involved in a joint venture with the Nanjing Group, producing the SEAT Ibiza-based Nanjing Yuejin Soyat for the Chinese market.

Lion Group's key assets in Malaysia are two steel mills with a capacity of 3 million tons a year, a forest concession in Sabah that is four times the size of Singapore, and the Silverstone tyre making business. Lion also has 26 Parkson department stores in Malaysia, 13 stores in China, and nine breweries in China.

The group has offices in Malaysia, Singapore, Indonesia, Vietnam, Cambodia, Sri Lanka, the United States and Mexico.

In 2010, Cheng acquired 33.5 million shares in Lion Industries Corp Bhd, one of the group's subsidiaries. In 2018, Lion Industries entered into an agreement to acquire the assets of Megasteel Sdn Bhd in an attempt to pay off the latter's debts. Cheng is a shareholder in both companies.

== Listed companies in Malaysia ==
- Lion Corporation Berhad (MYX: 3581)
- Lion Diversified Holdings Berhad (MYX: 2887)
- Lion Forest Industries Berhad (MYX: 8486)
- Lion Industries Corporation Berhad (MYX: 4235)
- Parkson Holdings Berhad (formerly known as Amalgamated Containers Berhad) (MYX: 5657)
- Amsteel Corporation Berhad (public, unlisted)
- Silverstone Corporation Berhad (public, unlisted)
- New Asia Entertainment Group Berhad (public, unlisted)
