= Nanjing Fiat Automobile =

Chinese car manufacturer

Nanjing Fiat Automobile Co., Ltd. 南京菲亚特汽车有限公司
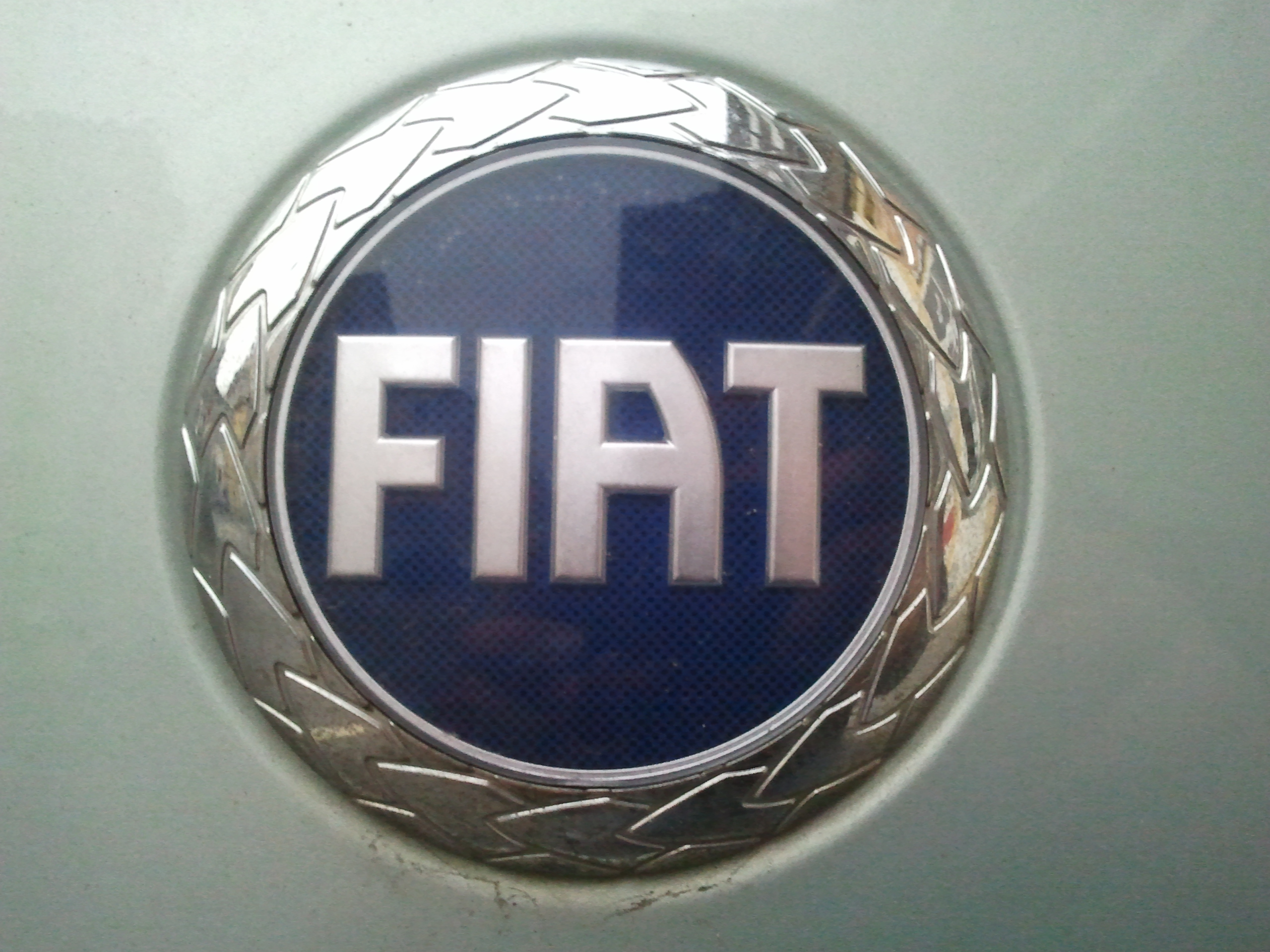
- Type: Joint venture
- Industry: Automotive
- Founded: April 1999
- Defunct: October 2006; 19 years ago
- Headquarters: Nanjing, China
- Area served: China
- Products: Automobiles
- Owner: Nanjing Automobile (50%); Fiat SpA (50%)
- Subsidiaries: Nanjing Nanya
- Website: www.fiat.com.cn

The Nanjing Fiat Automobile Co., Ltd. (simplified Chinese: 南京菲亚特汽车有限公司; traditional Chinese: 南京菲亞特汽車有限公司; pinyin: Nánjīng fēiyàtè qìchē yǒuxiàn gōngsī) was a car manufacturer located in the Jiangning District's Economic & Technological Development Zone in the city of Nanjing (People's Republic of China). The company was founded with an investment of 3 billion Yuan in April 1999 as a joint venture between Fiat Auto S.p.A. and the Nanjing Automobile Group. Around 30,000 up to 35,000 vehicles were manufactured annually for the Chinese market by Nanjing Fiat.

== History ==
The production began in November 2001 with the Fiat Palio. It was followed by the Fiat Siena in September 2002 and the Fiat Palio Weekend and Fiat Doblò in June 2003. The production of the Fiat Perla was launched in July 2006. The Perla was the last model launched by Nanjing Fiat. Another model, the Fiat Linea, was developed by Nanjing Fiat in cooperation with Tofaş A.Ş. and the Fiat do Brasil Ltda. The launch was scheduled for November 2006, but it never came because the Nanjing Automobile Group had forced to stop the car production until the end of the year, so the collaboration was officially terminated in order. In October 2006, Fiat had terminated their production in its Chinese facility. Nanjing Fiat was replaced by Roewe, the Chinese successor of the British Rover Group.

Most of Nanjing Fiat's tooling was acquired by Zotye in 2008. Zotye started building the Fiat Multipla as the Zotye Mutiplan in 2009 and an updated version of the Palio/Siena as the Zotye Z200 in 2011.

In July 2012, Fiat had founded a new Chinese joint venture. It's known as the GAC Fiat Automobiles Co., Ltd.

== Products ==
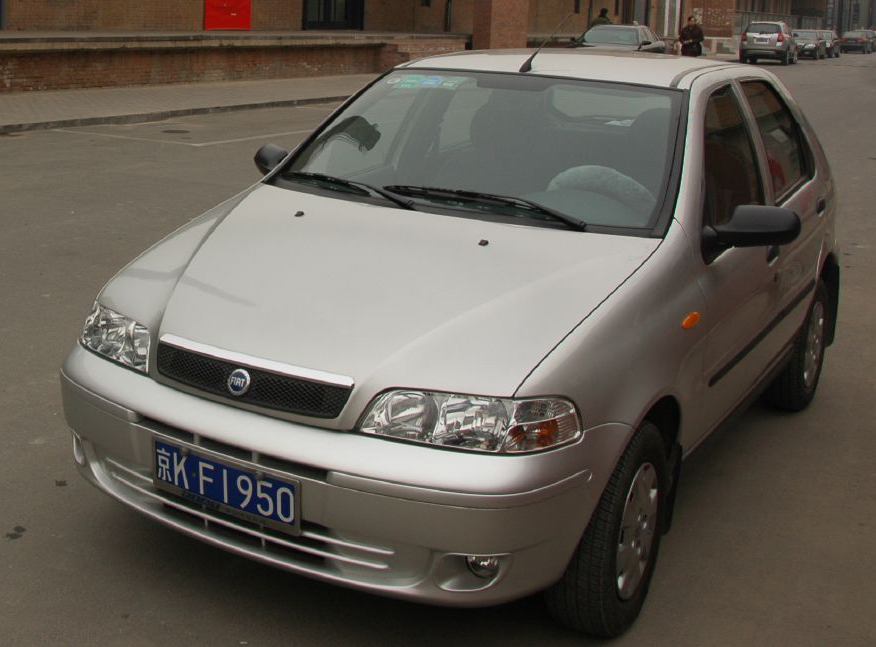
Fiat Palio
菲亚特派力奥
11/2001 – 10/2006

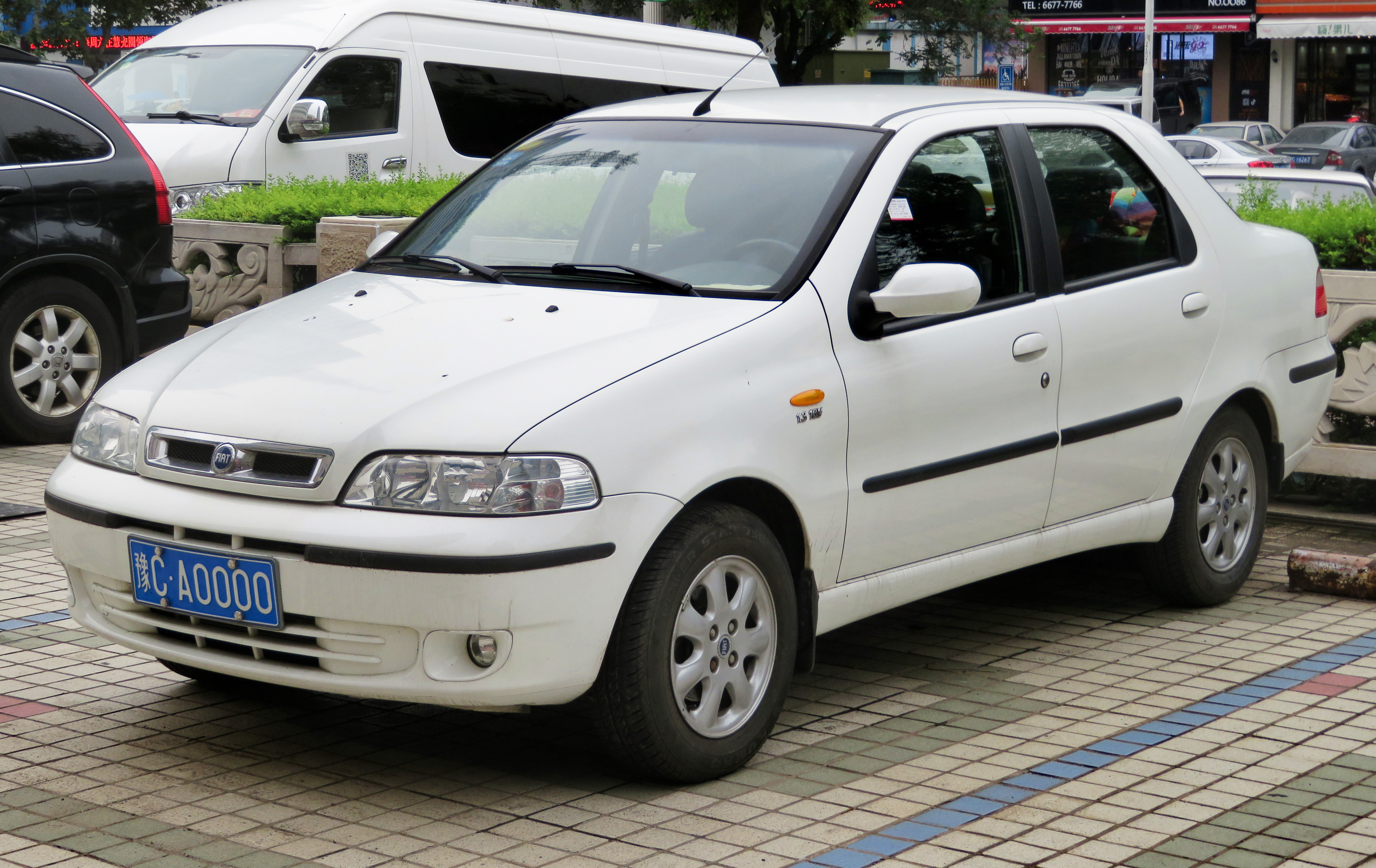
Fiat Siena
菲亚特西耶那
09/2002 – 10/2006

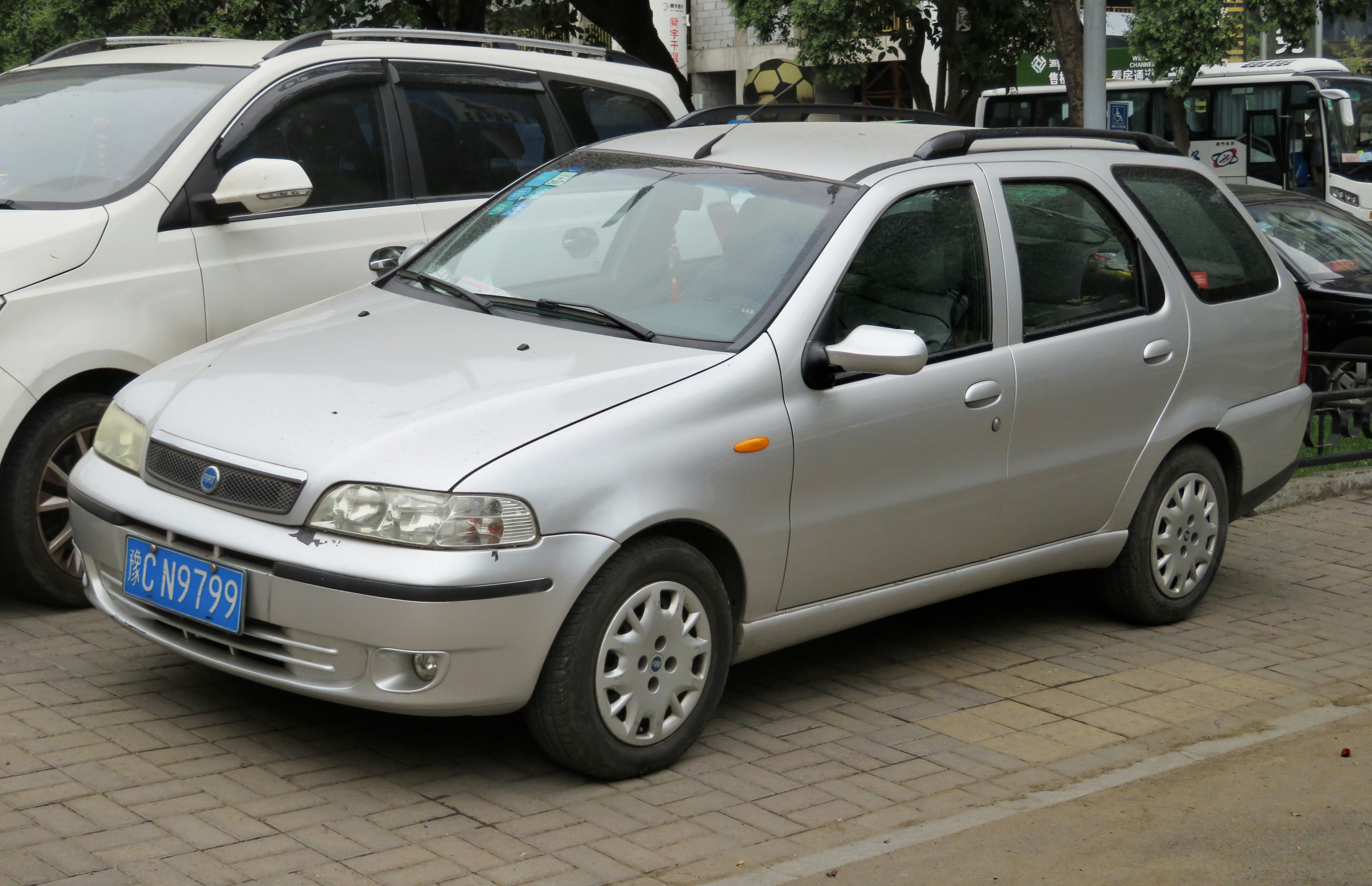
Fiat Palio Weekend
菲亚特派力奥
06/2003 – 10/2006

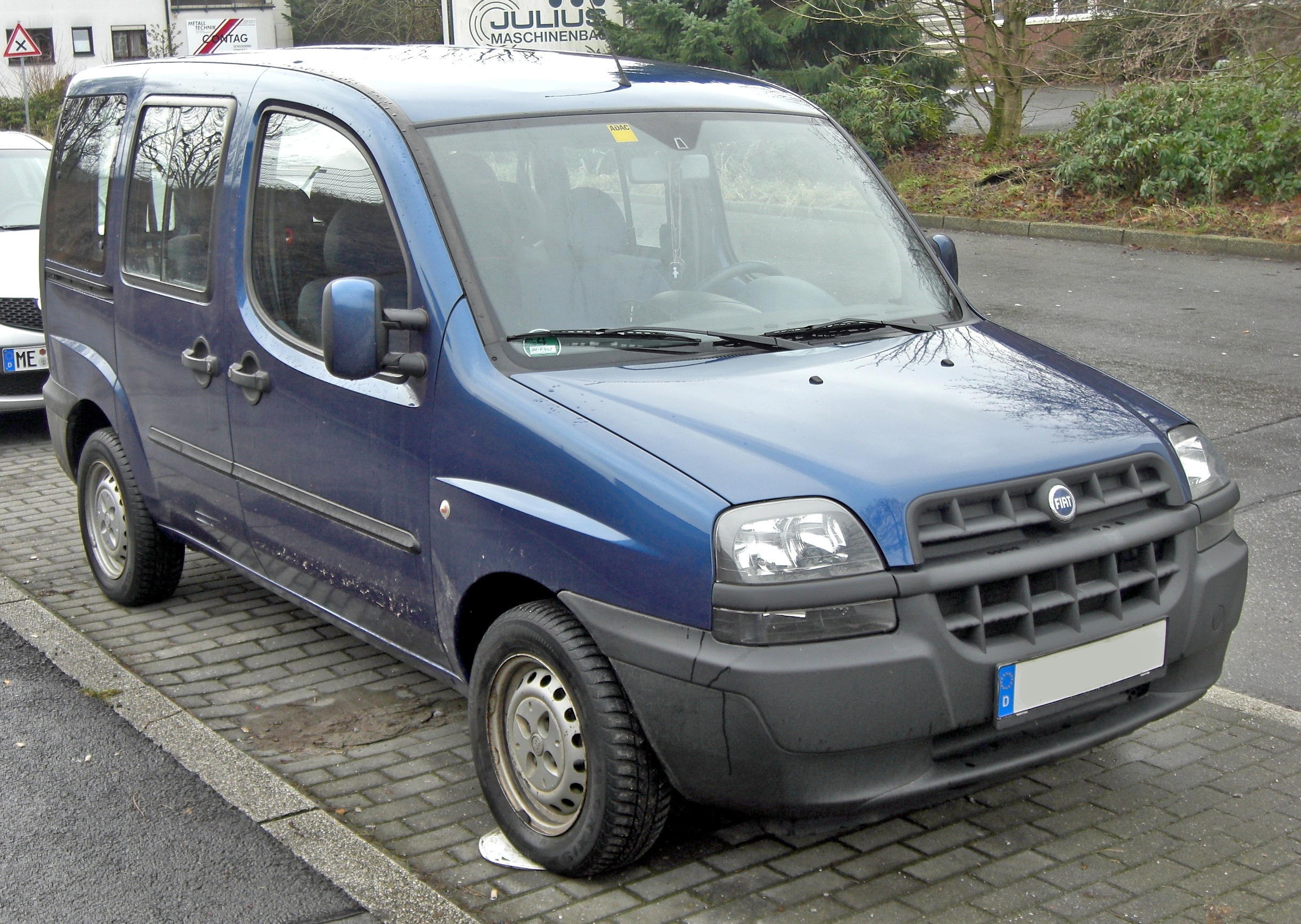
Fiat Doblò
菲亚特多宝
06/2003 – 10/2006

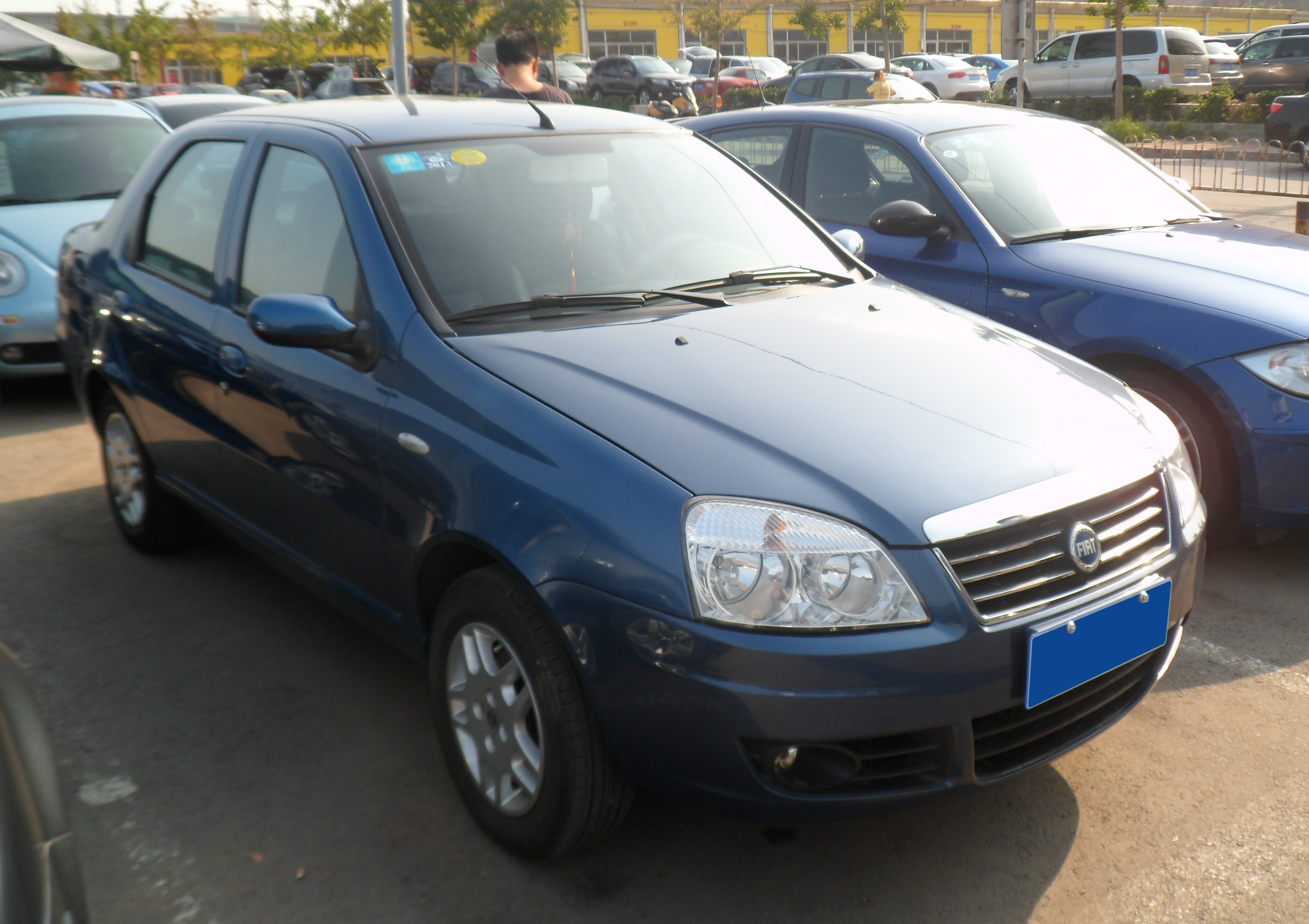
Fiat Perla
菲亚特派朗
07/2006 – 10/2006

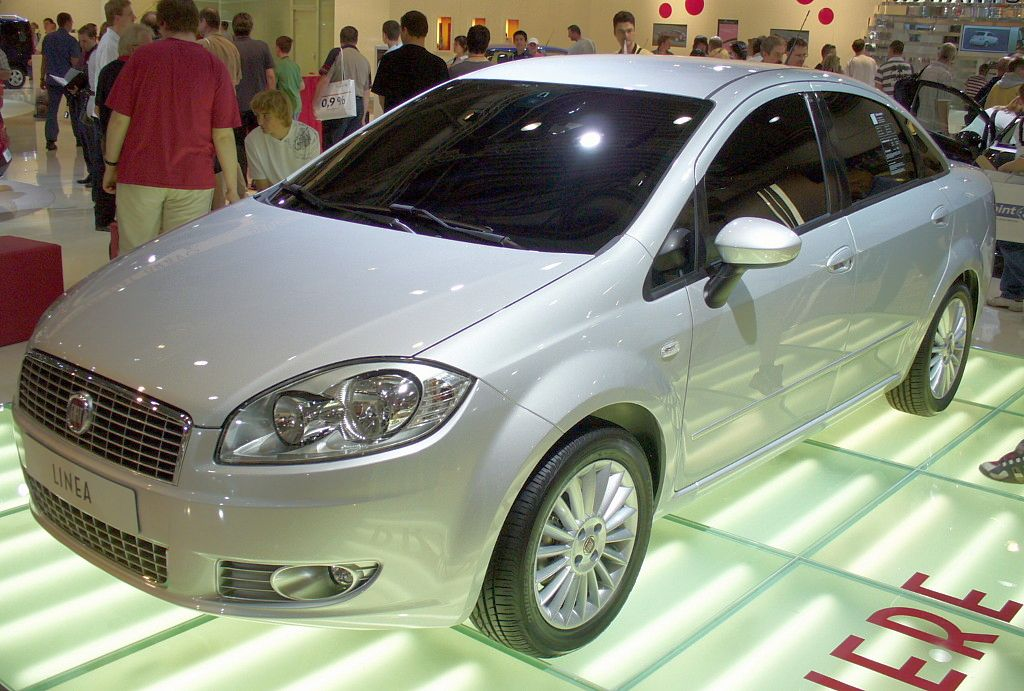
Fiat Linea
菲亚特领雅
never entered production
