= Parkson =

Asian department store chain

Parkson Holdings Berhad
- Type: Public limited company
- Traded as: MYX: 5657
- ISIN: MYL5657OO001
- Industry: Department stores
- Founded: 1987; 39 years ago
- Founder: William Cheng
- Headquarters: Republic Plaza, Singapore
- Number of locations: 81 stores (2025)
- Area served: Malaysia; China; Laos
- Operating income: SGD$520.4 million (2024)
- Parent: Lion Group
- Website: parkson.com.sg

Parkson Holdings Berhad (Chinese: 百盛; pinyin: Bǎishèng; Cantonese Yale: Baaksìhng) is a Malaysian department store chain founded in 1987. Parkson was created by William Cheng and is a subsidiary of the Cheng-owned Lion Group.

As of 2025, Parkson operates 37 stores in Malaysia (including four in Kuala Lumpur), as well as 44 locations across China. A Parkson-brand shopping centre operates in Vientiane, Laos. Parkson is a member of the Intercontinental Group of Department Stores.

== History ==
Parkson opened its first store at Sungei Wang Plaza as Parkson Grand in 1987.

In December 2011 the company expressed its intent to open stores in Cambodia, Myanmar, the Philippines, and Thailand.

Parkson purchased a 41.8% stake in Sri Lankan department store chain Odel in 2012. The stake was sold to Softlogic in 2014.

In 2018 Parkson closed its Sungei Wang Plaza and Maju Junction stores due to changes of the customer base at both locations. The Puchong store closed after just 18 months of operation in late 2019.

The MyTown Shopping Centre branch closed in February 2020. Two stores were closed in 2021 bringing the total store count to 37.

== International operations ==
=== Current operations ===
==== China (1994–present) ====
Parkson entered China in 1994 with store on Beijing's Fuxingmen Road.

Parkson opened in Qingdao in 1998.

In 2012 Parkson purchased the Qingdao Shopping Mall with intentions to open a store in the centre.

The fourth store in Chongqing opened in May 2013 at Chongqing Fortune Mall.

Five Chinese stores were closed in 2016, followed by the closure of stores in Beijing (Changying Street), Hefei, and Zhengzhou in 2017.

==== Laos (2020–present) ====
In February 2020 Parkson opened a shopping mall in the Sisattanak district of Vientiane, however, no Parkson department stores operate in the country.

=== Former operations ===
==== Vietnam (2005–2023) ====
Parkson entered Vietnam on 29 June 2005 with their first store in Saigontourist Plaza on Lê Thánh Tôn Street in Ho Chi Minh City. Two years later in 2007, Parkson opened their second store at Hùng Vương Apartment on Hồng Bàng Boulevard, District 5, Ho Chi Minh City (Chợ Lớn) named as Parkson Hùng Vương Plaza.

Parkson Landmark 72 in Hanoi opened in 2011.

In January 2015 Parkson closed its Keangnam Landmark 72 Hanoi stores due to poor sales. In the same month a new store opened in Da Nang. Parkson Paragon in Phú Mỹ Hưng urban area closed in May 2016 and was followed by the closure of Parkson Viet Tower in Đống Đa, Hanoi in December 2016.

Parkson Flemington (District 11, Ho Chi Minh City) and Parkson Cantavil (An Phú, Thủ Đức) closed in 2018. After the closure of Parkson TD Plaza in Haiphong, only the Ho Chi Minh City flagship store remained.

The flagship store in Saigontourist Plaza reopened in July 2020 as an expanded Parkson Saigontourist Plaza spans over the corner of Lê Thánh Tôn and Đồng Khởi Street, after renovations that saw the addition of a shopping mall to the building.

In early 2023 Parkson Vietnam filed for bankruptcy and closed its Ho Chi Minh City store, the only remaining branch in the country.

==== Indonesia (2011–2021) ====
Parkson entered the country by acquiring PT. Tozy Sentosa, the operator of Centro Department Store in 2011. Centro Department Store itself was developed by Suzy Darmawan Hutomo, master licensor holder for The Body Shop in Indonesia and sole daughter of Matahari founder, Hari Darmawan. Prior to the acquisition, Centro opened its first store at Plaza Semanggi, Jakarta in November 2003, followed by opening stores at Discovery Shopping Mall Bali, Plaza Ambarrukmo Jogjakarta, Margo City Depok, Mall of Indonesia Jakarta, and Summarecon Mall Serpong Tangerang.

After the acquisition, the department store network has since expanded to a total of 11 stores under the Centro brand and two stores under the Parkson brand, leading to a total of 14 stores (including Kem Chicks supermarket at Pacific Place Jakarta. Parkson Gourmet Market at Bintaro CBD, opened on 3 November 2016 but closed sometime in 2017) as of 1 December 2020.

The country's first Parkson store opened its door at Centre Point Mall, Medan on 28 November 2013. The second Parkson store at Lippo Mall Puri, Jakarta commenced operation on 27 June 2014 (closed in 2020 due to low sales and COVID-19 pandemic). The third Parkson store at Hartono Mall, Yogyakarta commenced operation on 22 December 2015.

According to the company website, the Centro brand will be focused on the middle-class segment while the Parkson brand focuses on the upper-middle-class.

In March 2021, PT. Tozy Sentosa were sued to bankruptcy due to failed payments to various vendors. Centro stores at Plaza Ambarrukmo, Jogjakarta and Bintaro Jaya Xchange Mall, Tangerang closed down following the lawsuit. Before that, however, two Centro branches at Mall of Indonesia and Plaza Semanggi, Jakarta were closed in 2018, followed by the Summarecon Mall Serpong branch on 3 January 2021. Some of former Parkson and Centro department stores has either been repurposed or replaced by other department store such as Matahari in Hartono Mall, Metro in Centre Point Medan, and other stores In April 2021, Parkson Hartono Mall and Centro Solo Paragon Mall closed its doors, and finally, on 17 May 2021, the company was officially declared bankrupt by court.

==== Myanmar (2013–2018) ====
Parkson entered Myanmar in 2012 in a partnership with Yoma and First Myanmar. The first and only store was opened in May 2013 at FMI Centre in Yangon. Parkson FMI Centre closed in 2017 and was replaced by a store at Yangon's Junction Square in March. This store later closed.

=== Cancelled ===
==== Cambodia ====
Parkson was planning to expand into Cambodia in 2016, however the shopping centre that Parkson planned to open in was not completed on schedule. This led to Parkson cancelling its Cambodian expansion plans.
