= William Cheng =

Malaysian businessman

Yang Berbahagia Tan Sri William H. J. Cheng
- Born: 1943 (age 82–83); Japanese Singapore
- Occupation: Businessman
- Title: CEO & Chairman of Lion Group
- Spouse: Chelsia Chan
- Children: 3

Tan Sri William Cheng Heng Jem or William H.J. Cheng (simplified Chinese: 钟廷森; traditional Chinese: 鍾廷森; pinyin: Zhōng Tíngsēn; Jyutping: Zung1 Ting4 Sam1; Pe̍h-ōe-jī: Cheng Têng-sim; born 1943) is the chairman of Lion Group Malaysia, a conglomerate having diversified businesses encompassing retail, property development, mining, steel, agriculture and computer. He is known for introducing the Parkson department store chain in 1987.

Tan Sri Cheng was previously president of both the Associated Chinese Chambers of Commerce and Industry of Malaysia (ACCCIM) and the Chinese Chamber of Commerce and Industry of Kuala Lumpur and Selangor (KLSCCCI) and is a life honorary president] of ACCCIM and KLSCCCI. He is director of Andalas Development Sdn Bhd.

Cheng is the largest shareholder of Parkson Holdings, which have more than 100 department stores in Malaysia, China, Vietnam and Indonesia. And assumed Parkson Retail Asia Ltd (PRA) executive position after his nephew Datuk Alfred Cheng stepped down as managing director in May 2013.

== Honour of Malaysia ==
- Malaysia
  - Commander of the Order of Loyalty to the Crown of Malaysia (P.S.M.) (1991)
