= Ningbo Bird =

Chinese mobile phone manufacturer

Ningbo Bird Co., Ltd.
- Company type: Public company
- Industry: Telecommunications
- Founded: October 1992 (Fenghua)
- Headquarters: Fenghua, China
- Key people: Xu Lihua (Chairman); Zhang Zhangxuan (President)
- Products: Mobile phones
- Website: http://www.chinabird.com/en/about/about.asp

Ningbo Bird or Bodao (宁波波导股份有限公司) is a Chinese manufacturer of mobile phones. Ningbo Bird was the largest vendor of mobile phones in China from 2003 to 2005.

== History ==
The company was established in 1992 in Fenghua and, in 1997, became China's largest pager manufacturer. Ningbo Bird started manufacturing mobile phones in 1999. It was listed on the Shanghai Stock Exchange () the next year. Seeking to expand into international markets, BIRD International was established in Hong Kong in 2003.

In 2009, Ningbo Bird sold its Shanghai-based operations for 60 million yuan, realising a gain of around 37 million yuan. In the same year, the company received a government subsidy of 14 million yuan.

== Operations ==
Ningbo Bird has research and development centres in Chongqing, Hangzhou and Ningbo.
