= Nanjing Automobile =

Chinese automotive company

Nanjing Automobile (Group) Corporation
- Native name: 南京汽车集团有限公司
- Type: Subsidiary
- Industry: Automotive
- Founded: 1947; 79 years ago (Nanjing)
- Headquarters: Nanjing, China
- Products: Passenger cars, commercial vehicles, trucks, buses
- Owner: P.R. China
- Parent: SAIC Motor
- Website: www.nanqi.com.cn

Nanjing Automobile
- Simplified Chinese: 南京汽车集团有限公司
- Traditional Chinese: 南京汽車集團有限公司
- Literal meaning: Nanjing Automobile (Group) Corporation
Transcriptions
Standard Mandarin
- Hanyu Pinyin: Nánjīng Qìchē Jítuán Yǒuxiàn Gōngsī

Nanjing Automobile is a state-owned enterprise with a history that dates from 1947, making it the oldest of the Chinese automobile manufacturers although the comparatively younger FAW Automotive was the first to make cars.

The group's products have included cars, trucks, and buses.

Nanjing Auto merged with the much larger SAIC in 2007 becoming a subsidiary of that company.

== History ==
=== Civil-war era ===
The history of the corporation dates to 1947 during the Chinese Civil War. In July 1949, a repair service center attached to the East China Field Army (which later became the Third Field Army) took control of an automobile workshop in Nanjing, Jiangsu province, former capital of the Republic of China, after the People's Liberation Army had conquered the city.

=== Early light-truck production (Yue Jin brand) ===
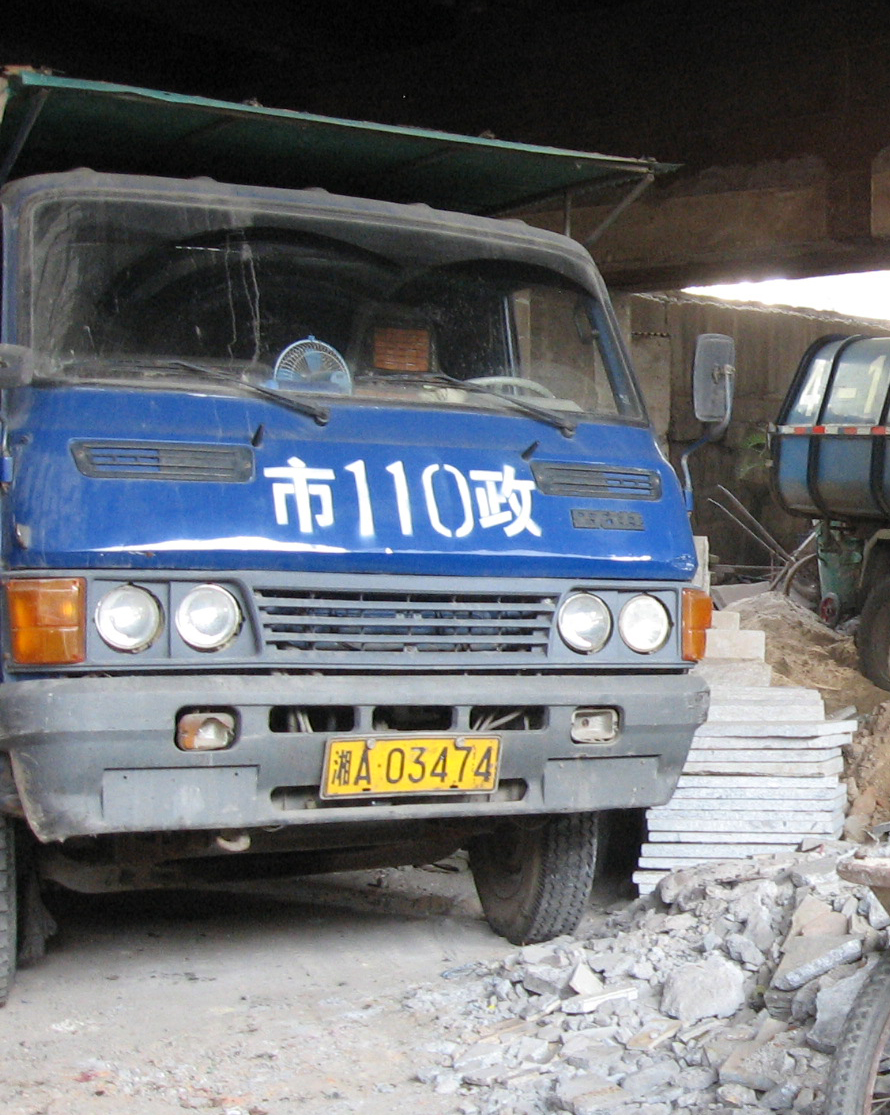
Late Nanjing Yuejin light truck (NJ131)

In the 1950s, oversight of the small automobile workshop that would become Nanjing Automobile was transferred to China's First Ministry of Industrial Machinery. It began making China's first domestically produced light-duty trucks in 1958, the 2½ ton NJ-130, based on the GAZ-51 from the Soviet Union. The Ministry branded the truck Guerin (跃进牌汽车 - literally meaning "Leap Forward") and approved the establishment of Nanjing Automobile Works that same year. Truck production continued until July 1987 at which point 161,988 units of various models including the NJ-130, NJ-230, NJ-135, and NJ-134 had been built.

Guerin later became Yue Jin while the Mandarin name remains 跃进.

=== Technology transfers ===
Nanjing Auto has repeatedly used technology transfers to make the company more competitive.

==== Mid-1980s to 1990s ====
In the mid-1980s, Nanjing Auto purchased designs and moulds from Isuzu and obtained technology from the Italian Iveco, the commercial vehicle unit of Fiat, participating in a spate of technology transfer deals circa 1980 that saw Japanese designs and machinery sold to Chinese buyers.

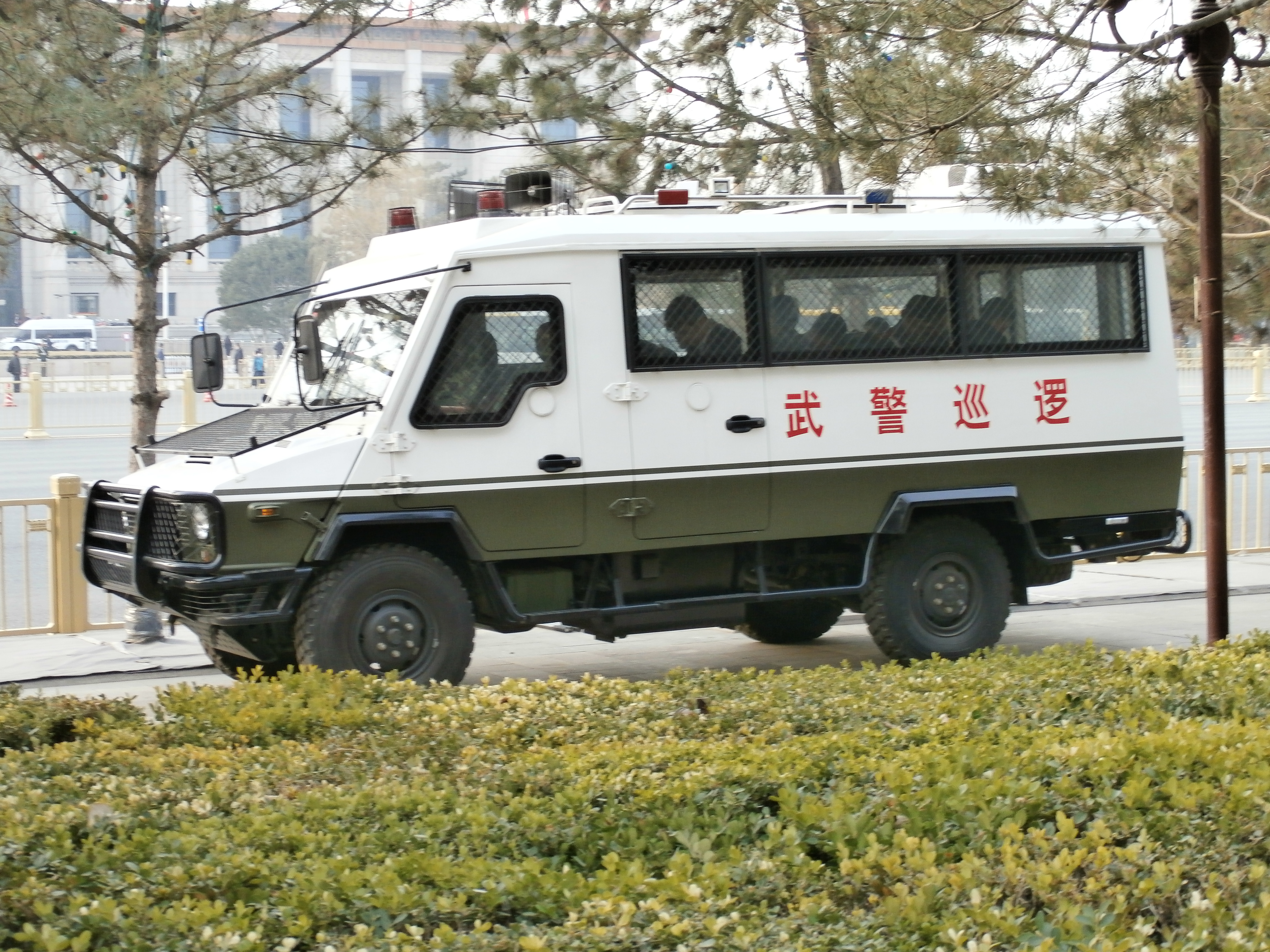
NJ2045/2046 police truck at entrance to Tiananmen Square.

The Iveco purchases allowed Nanjing Auto to produce a version of the Iveco Daily. Nanjing also produces the NJ2045/2046 truck, which is used by the Chinese Army and based on the Iveco VM 90.

==== 2000s ====
In 2000, the design, and possibly the tooling, for SEAT's first generation Ibiza was purchased and the car sold in China as the Nanjing Yuejin Soyat.

=== MG Rover ===
==== Acquisition of MG Rover Group assets ====
Nanjing Auto acquired some assets of MG Rover Group and Powertrain Ltd in 2005 after the group had entered administration. According to the purchase agreement, Nanjing Auto bought MG, Austin, and some other dormant British car brands, and the production technology and equipment for the MG ZT and MG TF models. Some equipment and blueprints were repossessed by Honda, as its intellectual property was used in some of MG Rover vehicles, in particular, the Rover 45 and MG ZS, which were based on the Honda Domani.

==== MG production plan ====
Nanjing Auto decided to establish production bases for MGs at Longbridge and Nanjing. A plan to open another factory in Ardmore, Oklahoma, USA was not realized. The production of engines, transmissions and medium and low end vehicle products would be transferred to China, where a supply chain would also be set up. A production facility would be retained in the UK, with the original Longbridge site integrated to resume the production of MG TF sport cars. Meanwhile, by making use of the R&D capability and personnel in the UK as well as that of China, the Euro IV engines and a new generation of vehicles would be developed and then produced in both China and the UK.

In 2007, Nanjing Auto planned to build 13,000 cars based on the Rover 75 / MG ZT sedan, renamed MG 7. These cars would be mostly sedans (saloons), plus some MG 7T estate cars. It also planned 3,000 MG TF convertible sports cars.

==== Pukou plant ====
MG Foundation Laid

The MG Factory of Nanjing Auto is located in the High-level New Technology Economic Development Zone in Pukou (a new district of Nanjing). The capacity of the Nanjing-MG Factory will reach 200,000 autos, 250,000 engines and 100,000 gear-boxes.

The initial MG range consisted of just the MG 7 and the MG TF. Nanjing Auto also started production of the Rover Streetwise-based MG 3SW in 2008.

==== Longbridge plant ====
The plant at Longbridge was for many years one of the most important car making factories in Europe as well as the largest British-owned car manufacturing plant, making Austin cars for most of the 20th century. After the Abingdon plant closed in 1980, Longbridge was also from 1982 the home of MG and then of the Rover marque which gradually replaced Austin in the late 1980s.

The site is owned by St. Modwen Properties which acquired 412 acres (1.67 km^{2}) in two deals in 2003 and 2004 for £57.5 million and leased it back to MG Rover Group. A 33-year deal was signed in February 2006 between Nanjing Auto and St. Modwen Properties covering the lease of 105 acres (a quarter of the total area of the Longbridge plant) but including the two main car assembly plants, the paint shop and administrative offices at a rent of around £1.8 million a year. £10 million was estimated to be needed to reopen the factory.

With the merger of Nanjing Auto and SAIC, ownership of the Longbridge plant became a SAIC controlled facility.

=== Chang Da ===
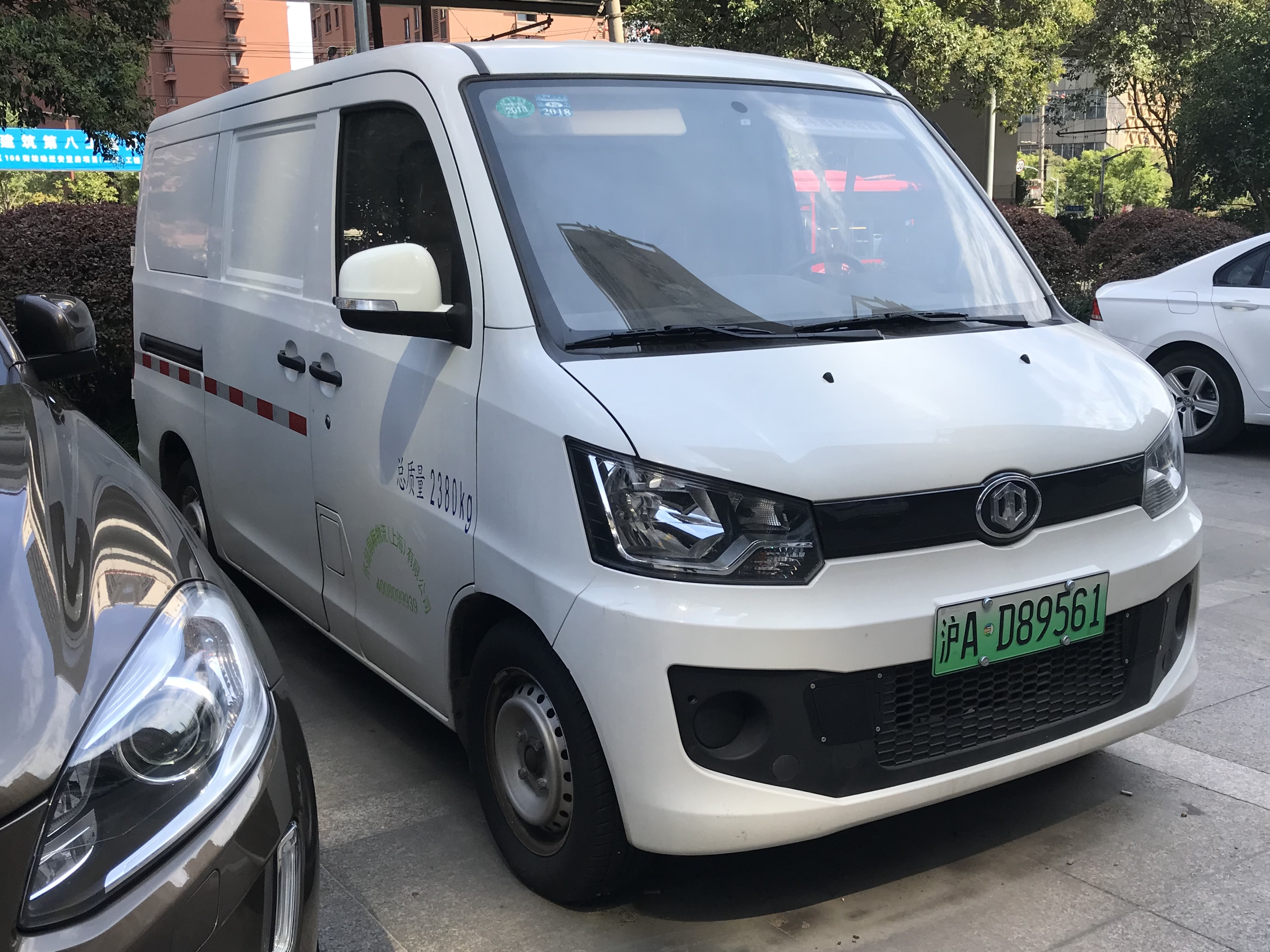
NAC Chang Da H9 in Shanghai

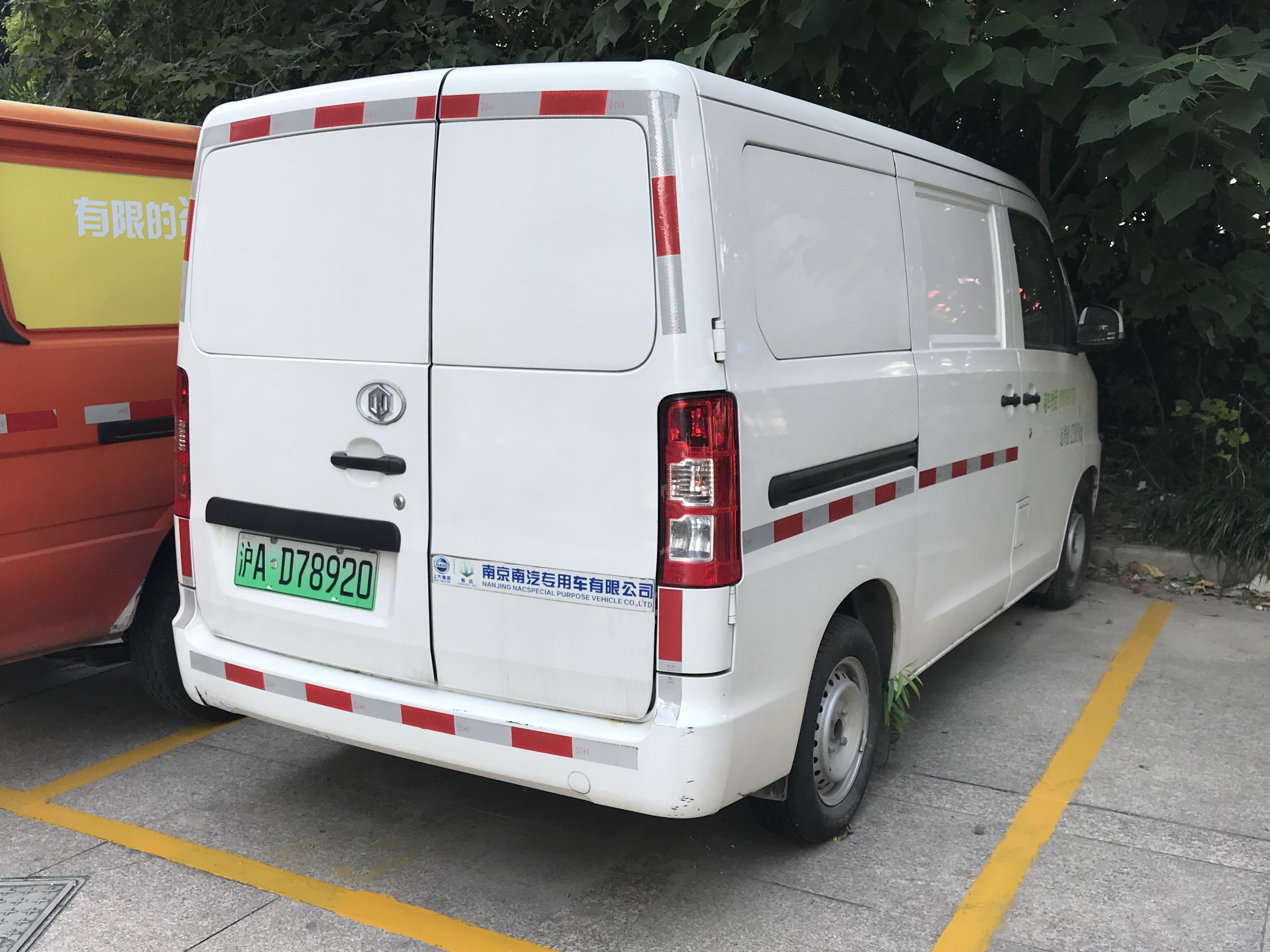
Chang Da H9 rear with the SAIC and Nanjing NAC label

Chang Da (畅达) is an NEV sub-brand of Nanjing Automobile and SAIC. Established in 2009, Chang Da has been developing electric light logistics vans for "the last mile" delivery. The first product, Chang Da H9 is based on the structure of FAW Jiabao V80 (佳宝V80) and took three years to develop before being launched in 2017. The Chang Da H9 could be either bought or leased in fleets.

== Joint ventures ==
Nanjing Auto has had at least two joint ventures with the Italian automaker Fiat. First, there was a 50/50 joint venture set up in 1999 that collapsed sometime in 2007. This was followed by Naveco, a joint venture with Fiat's commercial vehicles unit, Iveco, established in 1996.

=== Naveco ===
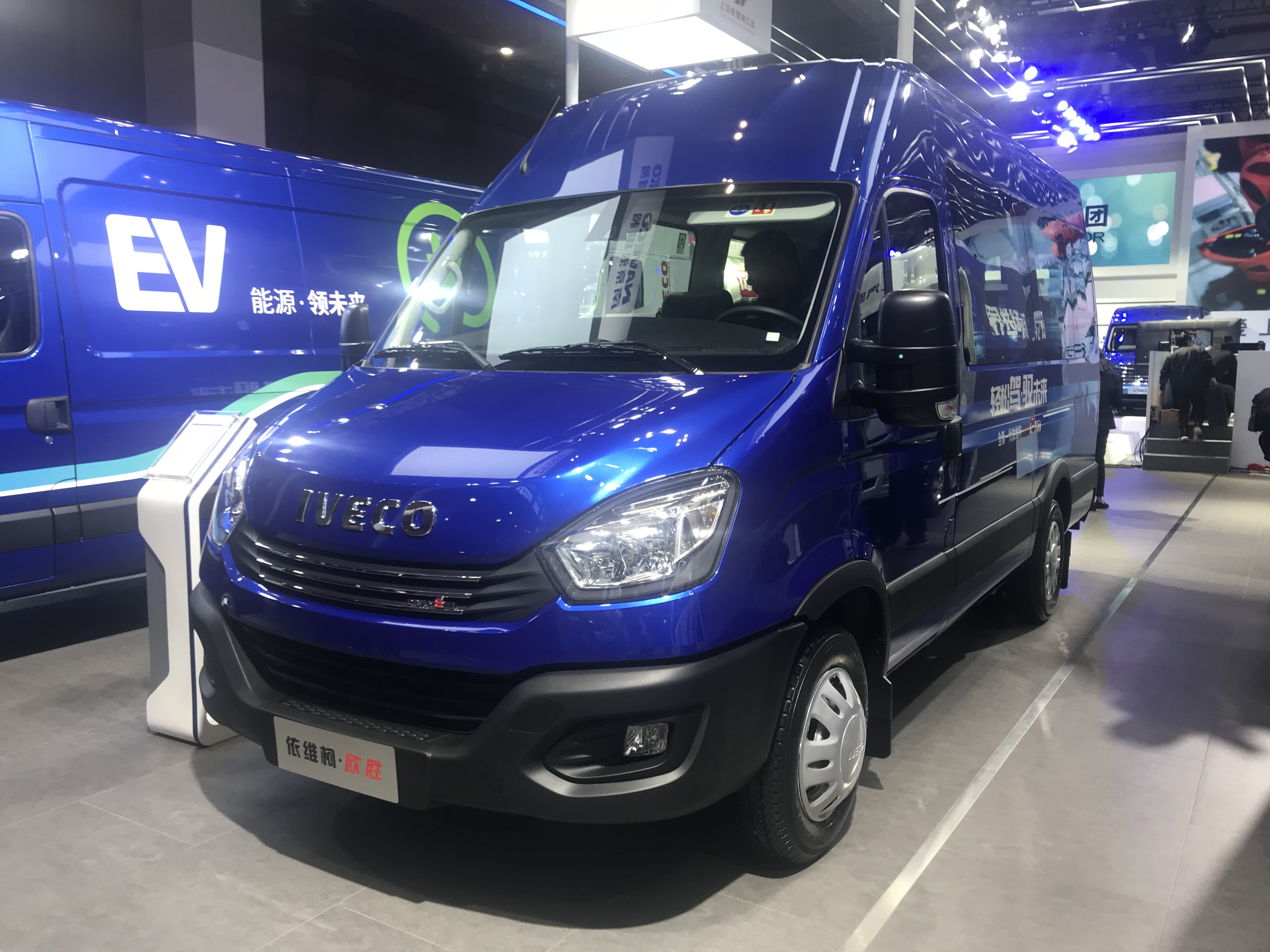
Naveco (Nanjing Iveco) Daily Ousheng

In 1996, Nanjing Auto established Naveco (Nanjing Iveco Automobile Co Ltd) with Iveco, Fiat's commercial vehicles unit. The joint venture initially manufactured a version of the Iveco Daily for sale in the Chinese market, and, as of 1995, it continued to make light trucks but had added diesel engines as well.

The company acquired the truck manufacturing assets of Yuejin Motor Co sometime in 2007.

In July 2017, Naveco started production of the new Iveco China Daily in the new factory of Qiaolin, Nanjing.

Naveco products include are listed below:

- Iveco Daily Ousheng (欧胜)- Facelift based on the second generation Iveco Daily.
- Iveco Power Daily (褒迪)- Facelift based on the third generation Iveco Daily.
- Iveco Xindeyi (得意)- Extended production of the first generation Iveco Daily
- Iveco Ouba
- Iveco Venice
- NJ2045/2046
- Iveco Fidato (聚星)- Rebadged van based on the Maxus V70
- Iveco Lingsheng V100 (领胜 V100)- Rebadged van based on the Wuling Yangguang Pro

=== Nanjing Fiat ===
Another joint venture was Nanjing Fiat, established with Fiat in 1999. This Italian automaker quit the company in 2007 citing a lack of investment on the part of its Chinese partner.

As of 2006, it was producing four models: the Perla and Siena sedans, Palio, compact and Palio Weekend station wagon. Most of Nanjing Fiat's design and tooling was taken over by Zotye in 2008.

The company was located in the Jiangning District's Economic & Technological Development Zone in Nanjing.

== Internal divisions ==
As the company further developed its management, four complete production ecosystems were created.

=== Yuejin Light Truck Co ===
A major manufacturing base of Nanjing Auto, it makes light-duty trucks under the Yuejin brand. The production of Isuzu-based SUVs and pickups was transferred to the Wuxi Soyat branch in 2005.

Sometime in 2007, Yuejin's truck-making business was merged with the Iveco-Nanjing Auto joint venture Naveco, which continued to sell under the Yuejin brand.

Located in an economic development zone in Huishan District, Wuxi, (about 150 km east of Nanjing) the Wuxi Branch of Yuejin Automobile Co is a Nanjing Auto production base, and it may be the newest having been built sometime after 2003. Production of the Junda SUVs and pickups was taken over from Nanjing's Yuejin brand in 2005. By 2008, after SAIC's takeover of Nanjing, Wuxi Soyat production came to a halt. The factory is now used by SAIC to build the Maxus commercial van.

Yuejin trucks were sold and imported by Surrey-based importer Yuejin UK. Founded in 2003, it offered a range of light commercial trucks including flatbeds, tippers, box vans and refrigerated trucks with styling resembling the Nissan Cabstar (F23). All trucks are powered by engines that can run on both petrol and liquefied petroleum gas (LPG). A technical specification sheet from 2004 states the model is a Yuejin NJ1030 followed by different designation letters depending on the configuration. It is unknown whether or not the NJ1030's design is based on the Nissan Cabstar or a different truck. The company was planning on importing the Isuzu D-Max-based Xinkai pickup (badged as the Xinkai XK) and a panel van produced by a different Chinese make. The company dissolved in 2013.

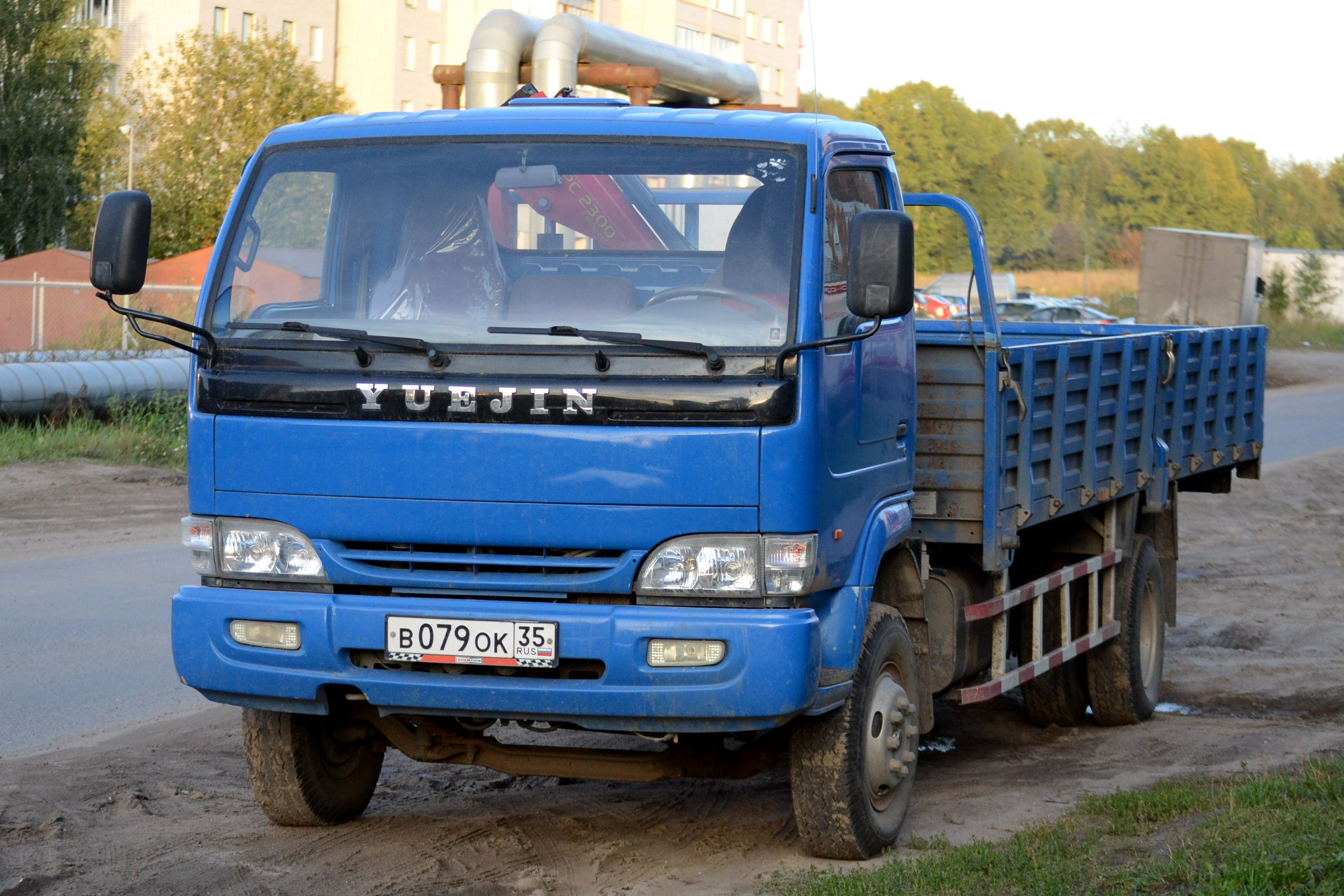
Yuejin NJ1080 in Russia

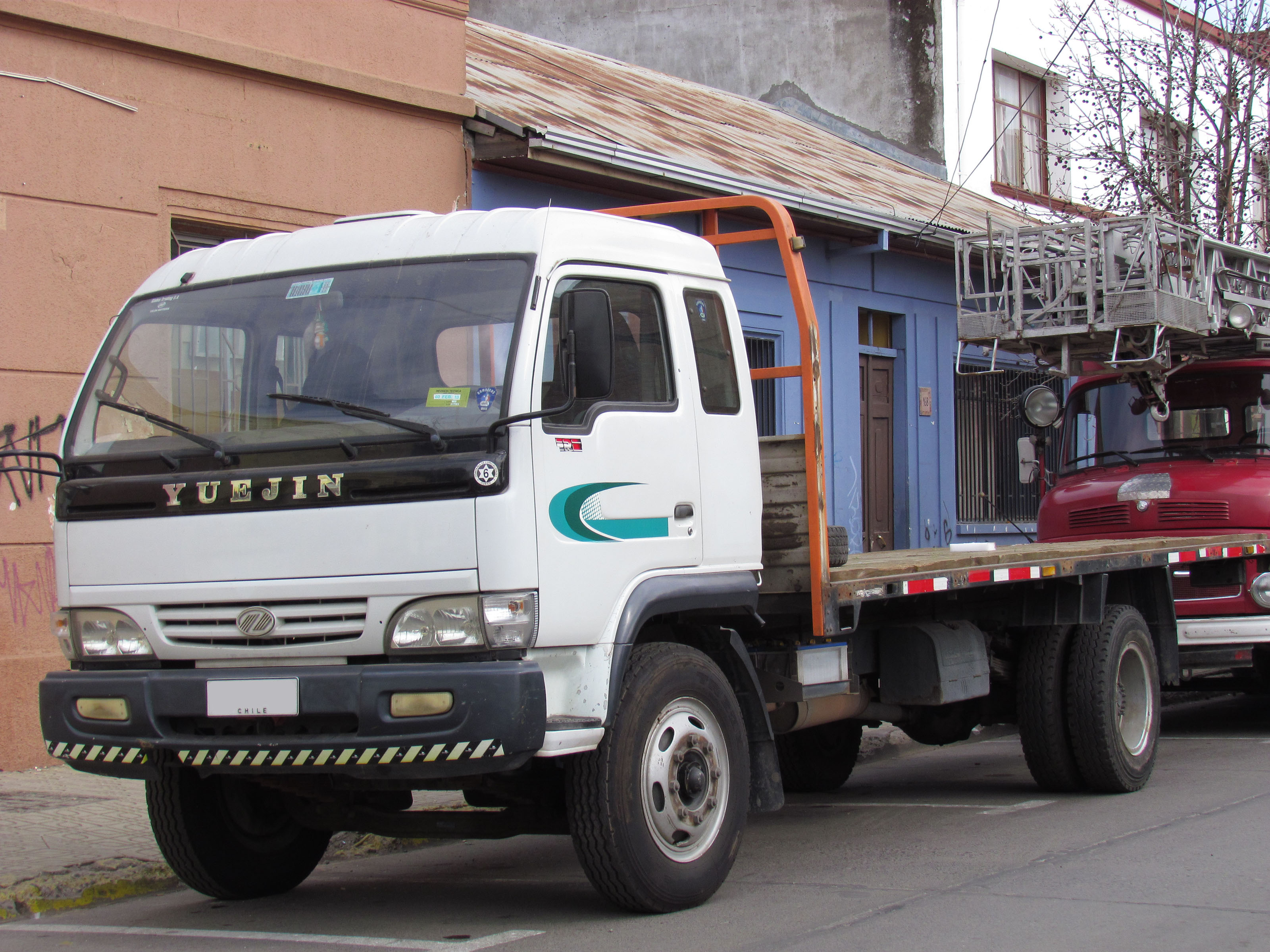
2008 Yuejin NJ-1063 flatbed in Chile

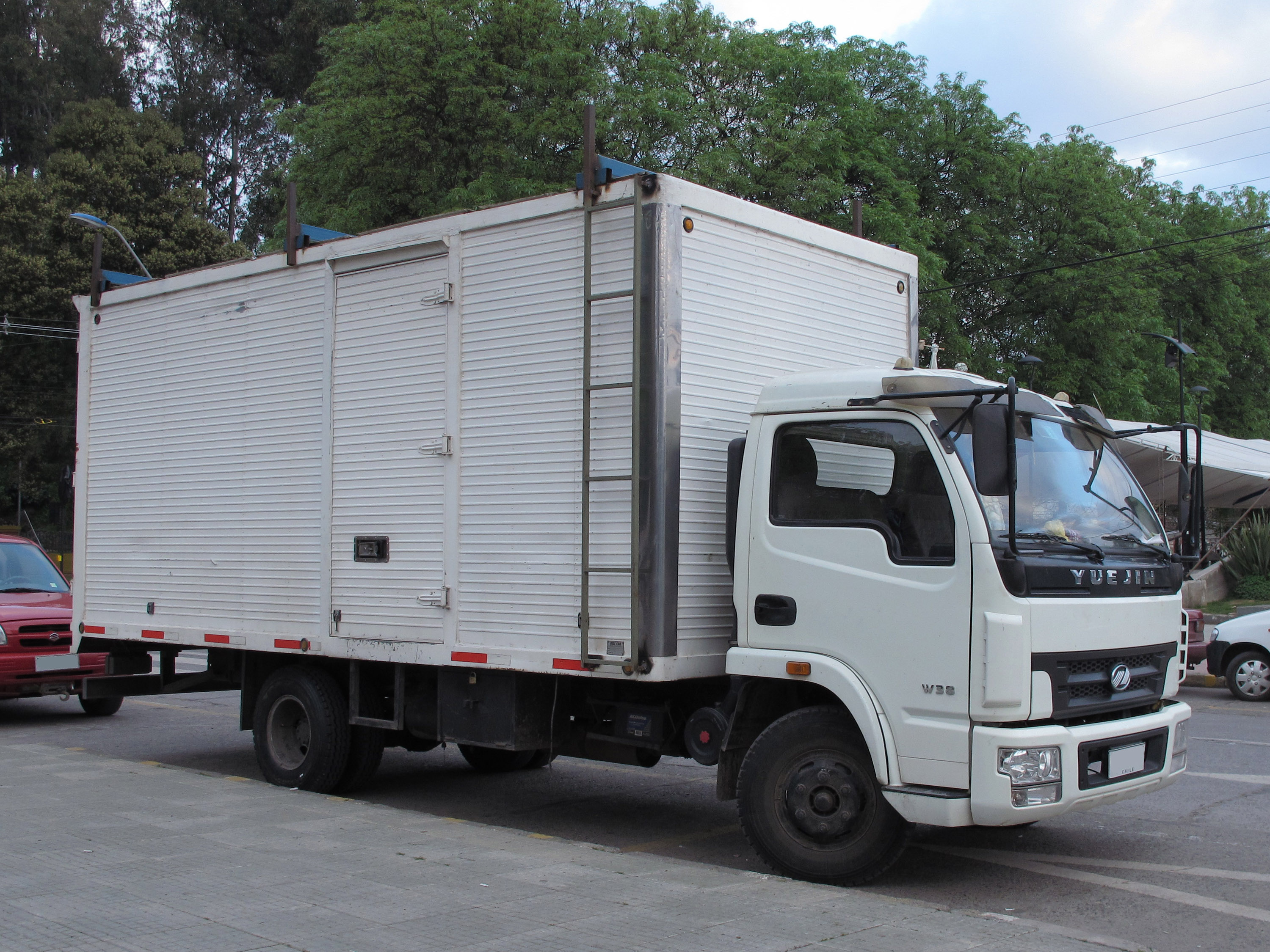
2011 Yuejin NJ-812 in Chile

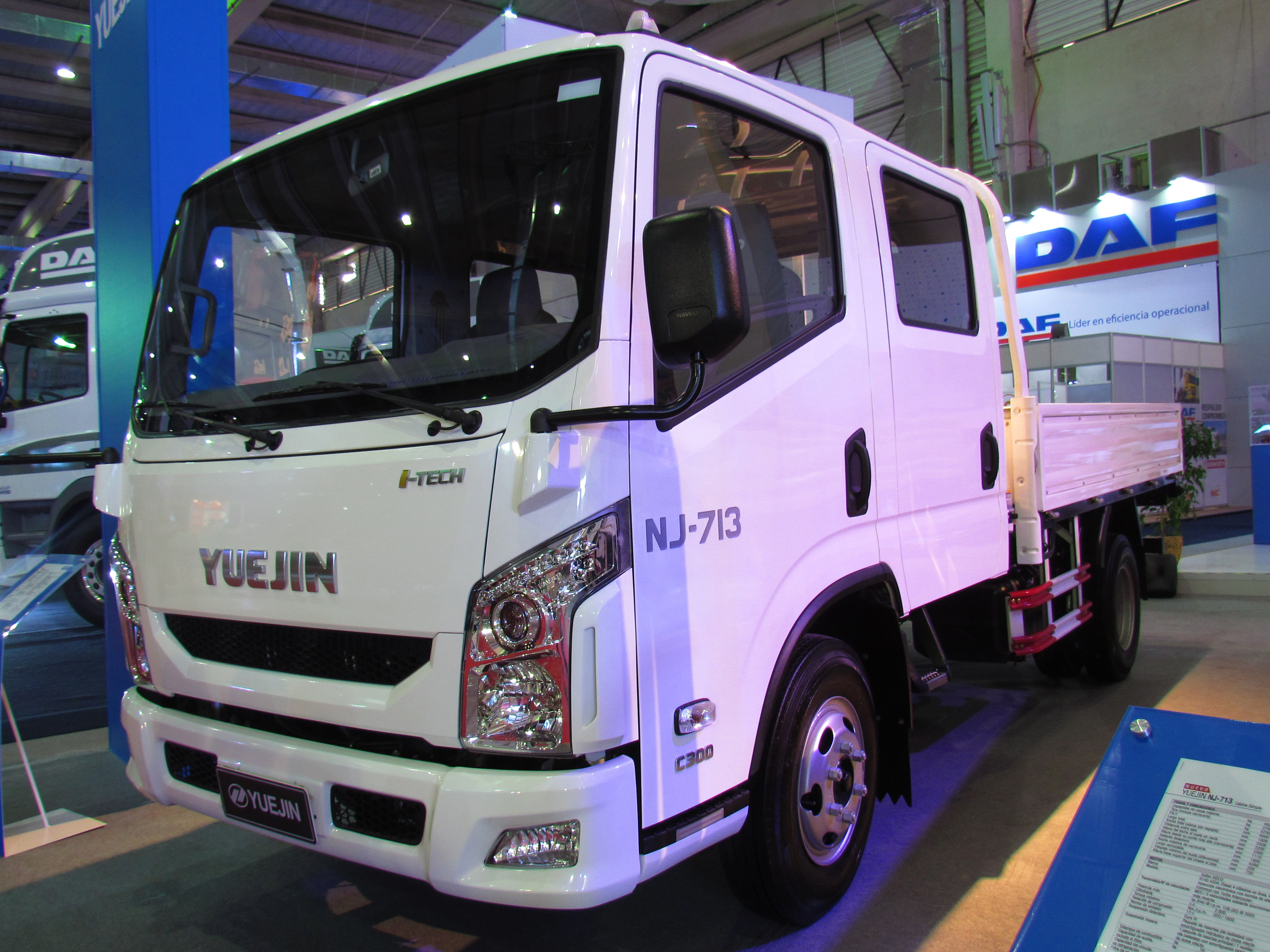
2014 Yuejin NJ-713 Crew Cab

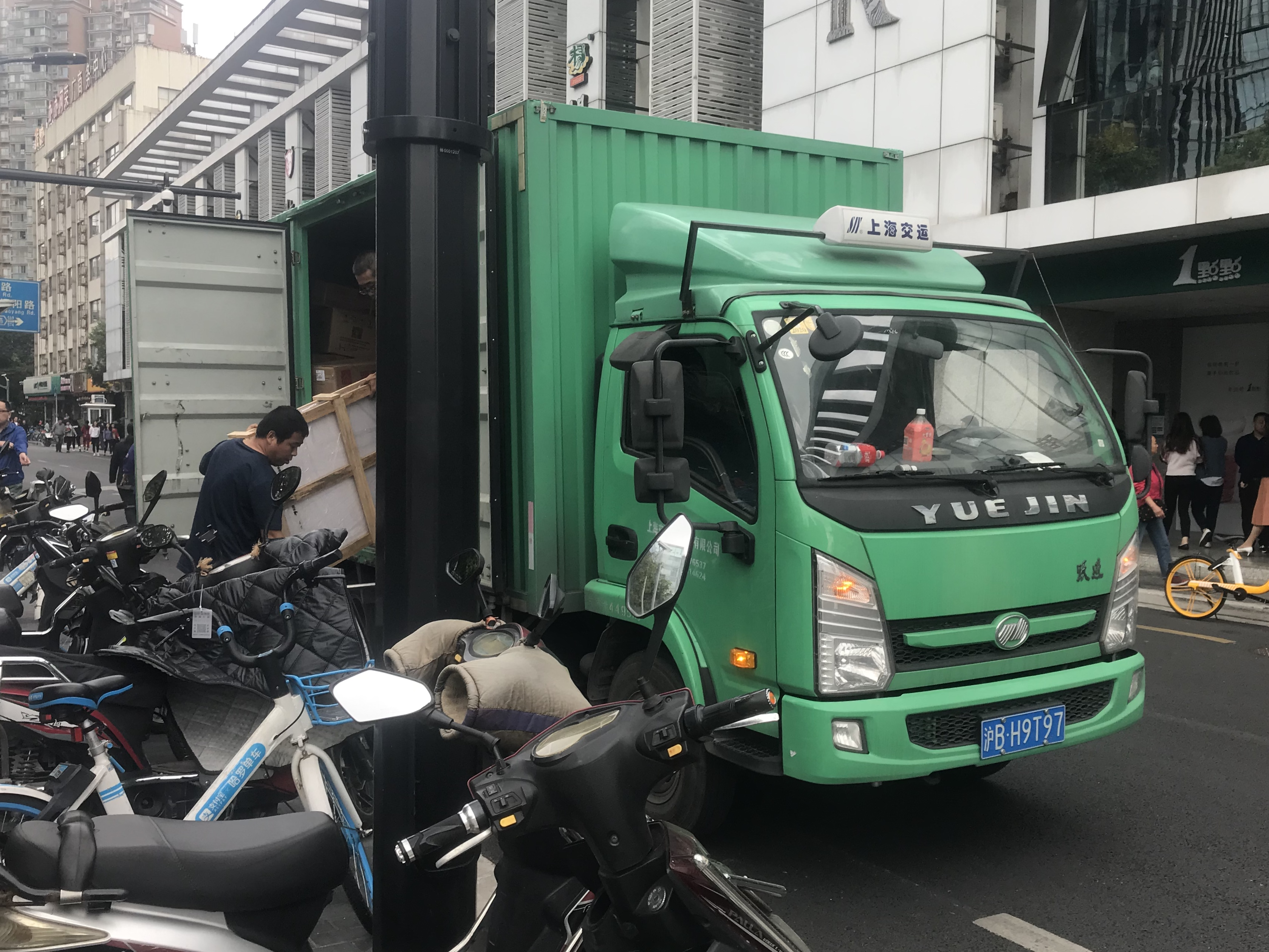
Yuejin Shangjun (跃进上骏) X100 series in China

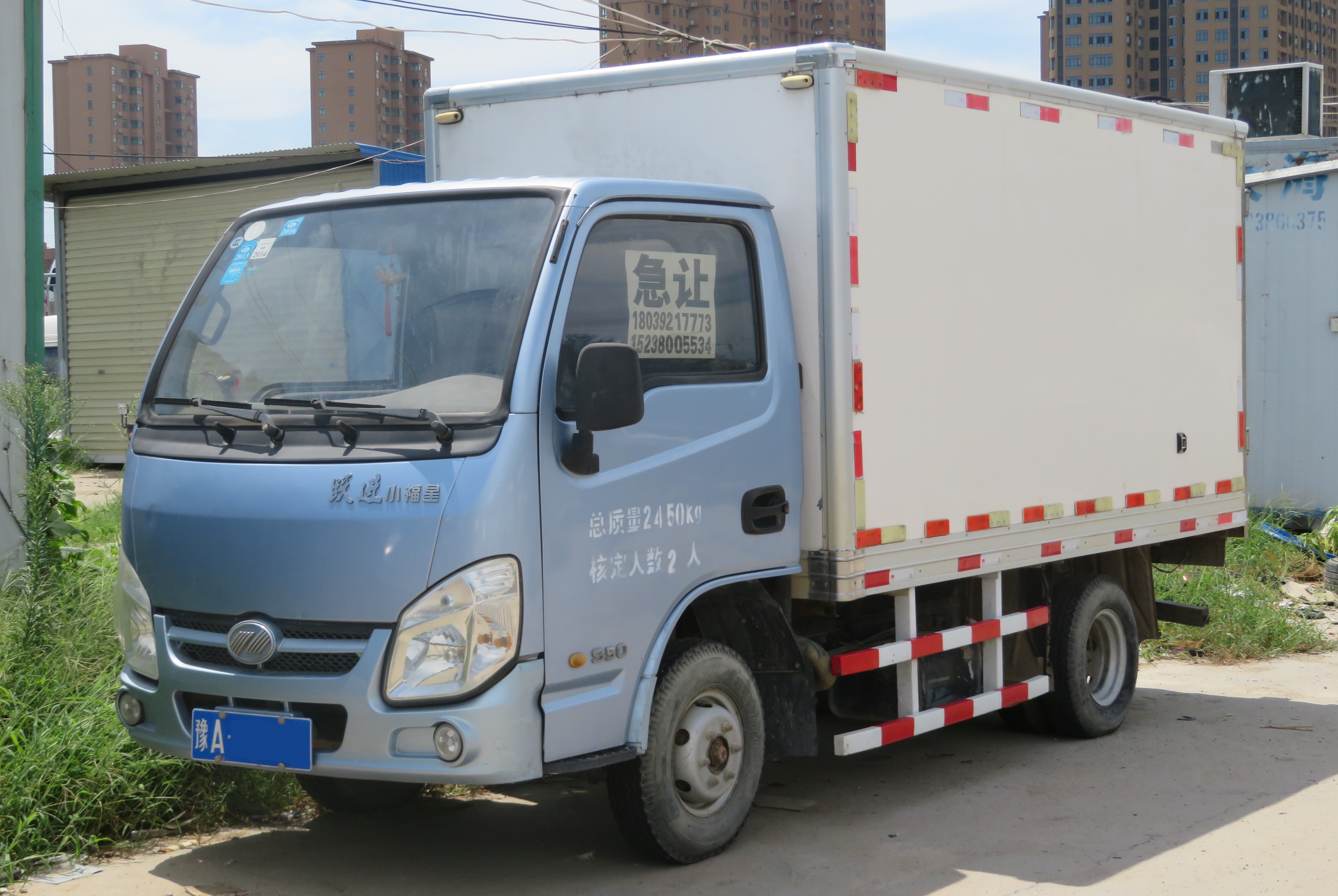
Yuejin Xiaofuxing (跃进小福星) S50 series in China

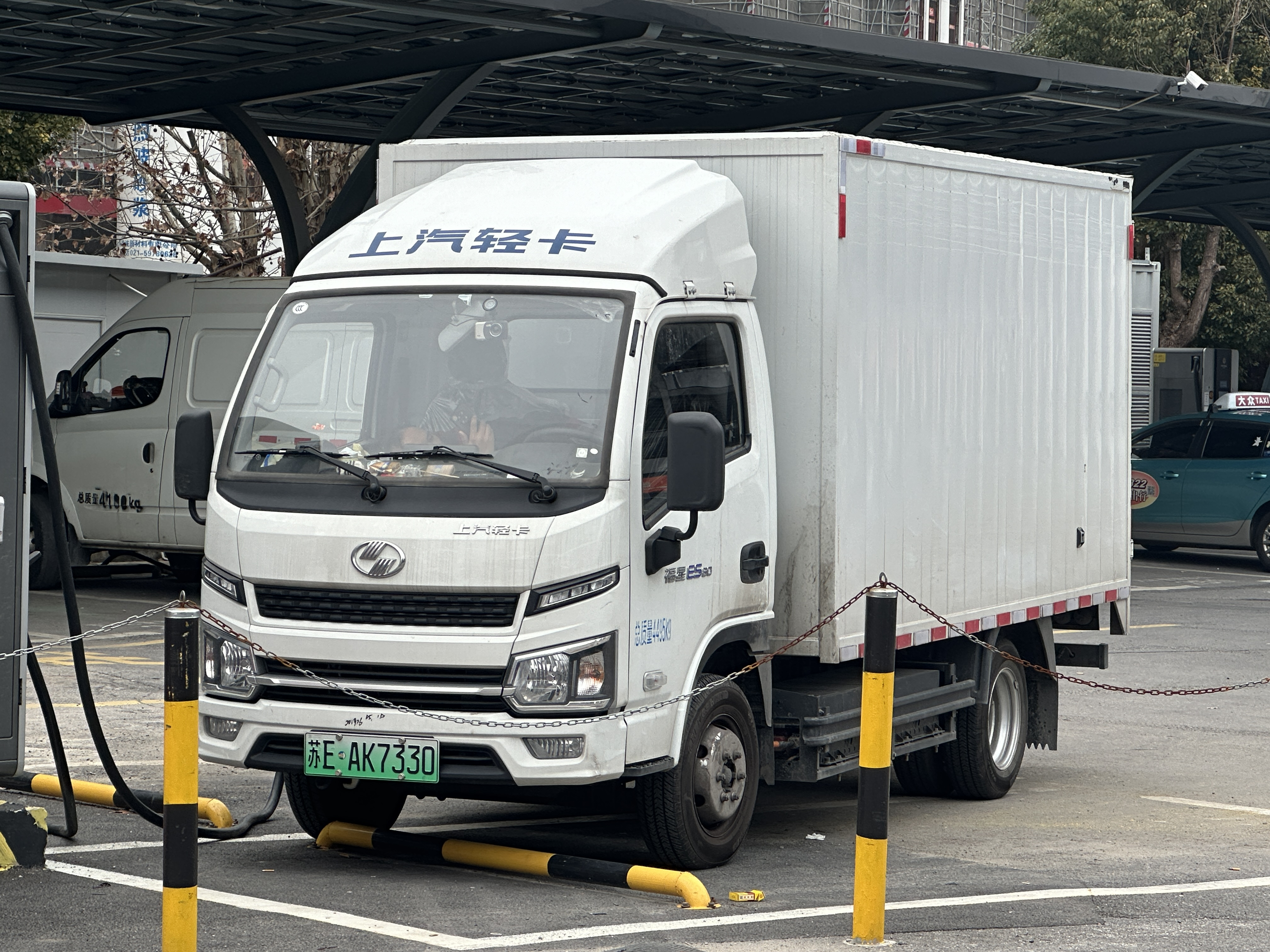
SAIC Fuxing ES80 (Electric version of the Yuejin Fuyun S80)

== Brands ==
Car brands owned by Nanjing Auto include:

- Soyat - the Nanjing Yuejin Soyat, a Chinese version of the first generation SEAT Ibiza, is sold under the brand. Discontinued in 2008.
- MG (MG Rover Group and Powertrain Ltd assets acquired by Nanjing Auto include other brands as well: Wolseley, Austin, Morris, Vanden Plas (outside the US & Canada), American Austin, Princess and Sterling)
- Yuejin - a commercial vehicle brand

== Legal ownership ==
Sometime before the 1980s, Nanjing Auto was under the joint jurisdiction of both the central and local governments. As of 2003, this vehicle manufacturer was owned by Yuejin Automobile Group of Jiangsu, which held just over fifty-per cent ownership of the company at this time, and two State firms created to dispose of non-performing bank loans, China Huarong Asset Management and China Cinda Asset Management. Nanjing Auto is now a subsidiary of SAIC, having been merged with the much larger automaker in 2007.

=== SAIC merger ===
A result of Chinese State policy to encourage mergers and acquisitions in the domestic automobile market, SAIC Motor and the state-owned parent company of Nanjing Auto, Yuejin Automotive Group, finalized a long-planned merger in December 2007. Fitful merger negotiations between the two companies had begun in 2001, and the tie-up was widely anticipated. Prior to the merger, but bidding alongside SAIC, Nanjing Auto purchased the remaining assets of British group MG Rover for near US$100 million.

== See also ==
- Automotive industry in China
