= Crescent Mall =

Shopping mall in Ho Chi Minh City, Vietnam

- Trung tâm thương mại Hồ Bán Nguyệt

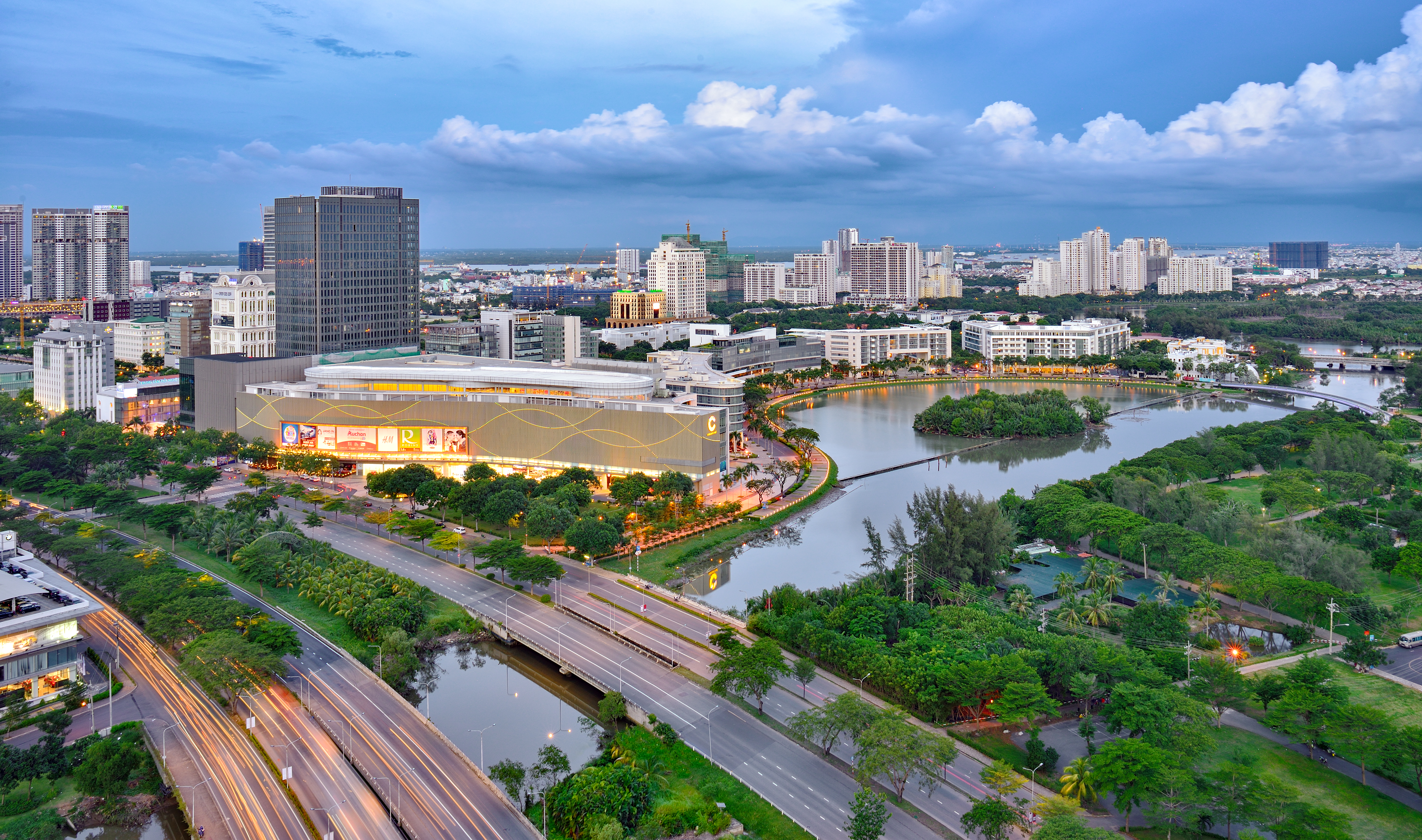
- Crescent Mall comprises Phú Mỹ Hưng Tower in 2019
- Alternative names: The Crescent (Khu phức hợp Hồ Bán Nguyệt)

General information
- Status: Completed
- Type: Shopping mall, Office
- Architectural style: Postmodern
- Location: The Crescent District – Phú Mỹ Hưng, 803 Nguyễn Văn Linh Parkway – No. 8 Hoàng Văn Thái Street – 101 Tôn Dật Tiên Street, Tân Mỹ, Ho Chi Minh City, Vietnam
- Coordinates: 10.728981°N 106.718692°E
- Named for: Crescent Lake
- Groundbreaking: 12 June 2009; 17 years ago
- Construction started: July 2009; 17 years ago
- Opened: 30 November 2011; 14 years ago
- Inaugurated: January 6, 2012; 14 years ago
- Cost: 2,310 billion ₫
- Owner: Phu My Hung Corporation
- Landlord: Savills

Height
- Top floor: 24 (Office tower), 6 (Mall)

Technical details
- Size: 112,000 m^{2} (1,210,000 sq ft)
- Floor count: Office tower: 25 (with 2 basements); Mall: 9 (with 3 basements)
- Floor area: 45,000 m^{2} (480,000 sq ft)

Design and construction
- Architect: Axel Korn
- Architecture firm: Skidmore, Owings and Merrill; Korn Architects
- Developer: Phu My Hung Corporation
- Other designers: Design international

Other information
- Number of stores: 200
- Parking: 3 basements

Website
- Crescent Mall

Crescent Mall, or also known as The Crescent, is a complex of shopping mall and Grade A office buildings in The Crescent District, Phú Mỹ Hưng planned city, Tân Phú, District 7, now is Tân Mỹ, Ho Chi Minh City, Vietnam. With an area of 112,000 m^{2} (1,210,000 sq ft) that consists a mall of 200 stores, featuring a supermarket, cinema, restaurants, cafes, and game arcade. Phase 2 of the complex included its expansion and a 24-storey office tower next to it named Phú Mỹ Hưng Tower, which is initially known as the Crescent Hub. Phase 3 of the complex is continue to expand the mall and build a new 40-story office building next to Thầy Tiêu Creek and Crescent Mall.

The mall was designed by Tan Gek Meng, and developed and owned by Phu My Hung Corporation. Its design incorporates the concept of ruyi, which is said to bring good luck and fortune.

== History ==
=== Phase 1 ===
Crescent Mall in 2016

The initial concept of Crescent Mall was first unveiled on 9 April 2008 by Phu My Hung Corporation. Skidmore, Owings and Merrill, and Design International were chosen as the master planners for Crescent Mall, with KORN Architekten, a German-based architecture firm as designers for the mall. Architect Axel Korn designed the building. The manager and leasing agent was Savills. The elevators and escalators were provided by Schindler and installed by Jardine Matheson.

The groundbreaking ceremony was performed on 12 June 2009 and construction began in July that year. During the groundbreaking ceremony, Vietcombank formed a consortium with Vietinbank, Bảo Việt Bank, Gia Định Bank (now is Bản Việt Bank), and Asia Commercial Bank to grant Phu My Hung Corporation a loan worth 1.2 trillion ₫ within 10 years. The mall had an invite-only preview by Phú Mỹ Hưng Corporation to selected guests, largely international and luxury brands, on 28 January 2010, before making retail lots available for lease.

The mall was first opened to the public on 30 November 2011 and officially inaugurated on 6 January 2012. The first Giant store in Vietnam opened in Crescent Mall, serving as the mall's first anchor tenant until 28 November 2018, when the Vietnamese operation was acquired by French-based retailer Auchan and replaced as anchor. However, Auchan announced its withdrawal from the Vietnamese market in May 2019 due to unprofitable and unsustainable operations in Vietnam and competition with the local supermarket chain Co.opmart. Auchan has closed most of its Vietnamese stores, but its branch in Crescent Mall will remain in operation until Tết in 2020 where after this period the anchor itself would be rebranded as a Co.opmart supermarket, with the name Co.op Xtra Premium. However, it was closed in 2023 and replaced by Aeon Nguyễn Văn Linh Super Supermarket

Robinson Department Store once opened its store here as Robins in November 2014, spanned over from Ground to Fourth Floor. It was the second store to be opened after 8 months of the first one in Vincom Mega Mall Royal City, Hanoi. However, the department store was silently closed in late 2024, as the store is no longer located in Crescent Mall, social media pages have stopped updating, and the website no longer links to the store's page.

H&M opened its third Vietnamese store in Crescent Mall on 8 September 2018, after the first one in Vincom Center Đồng Khởi (Ho Chi Minh City) and second in Vincom Mega Mall Royal City (Hanoi).

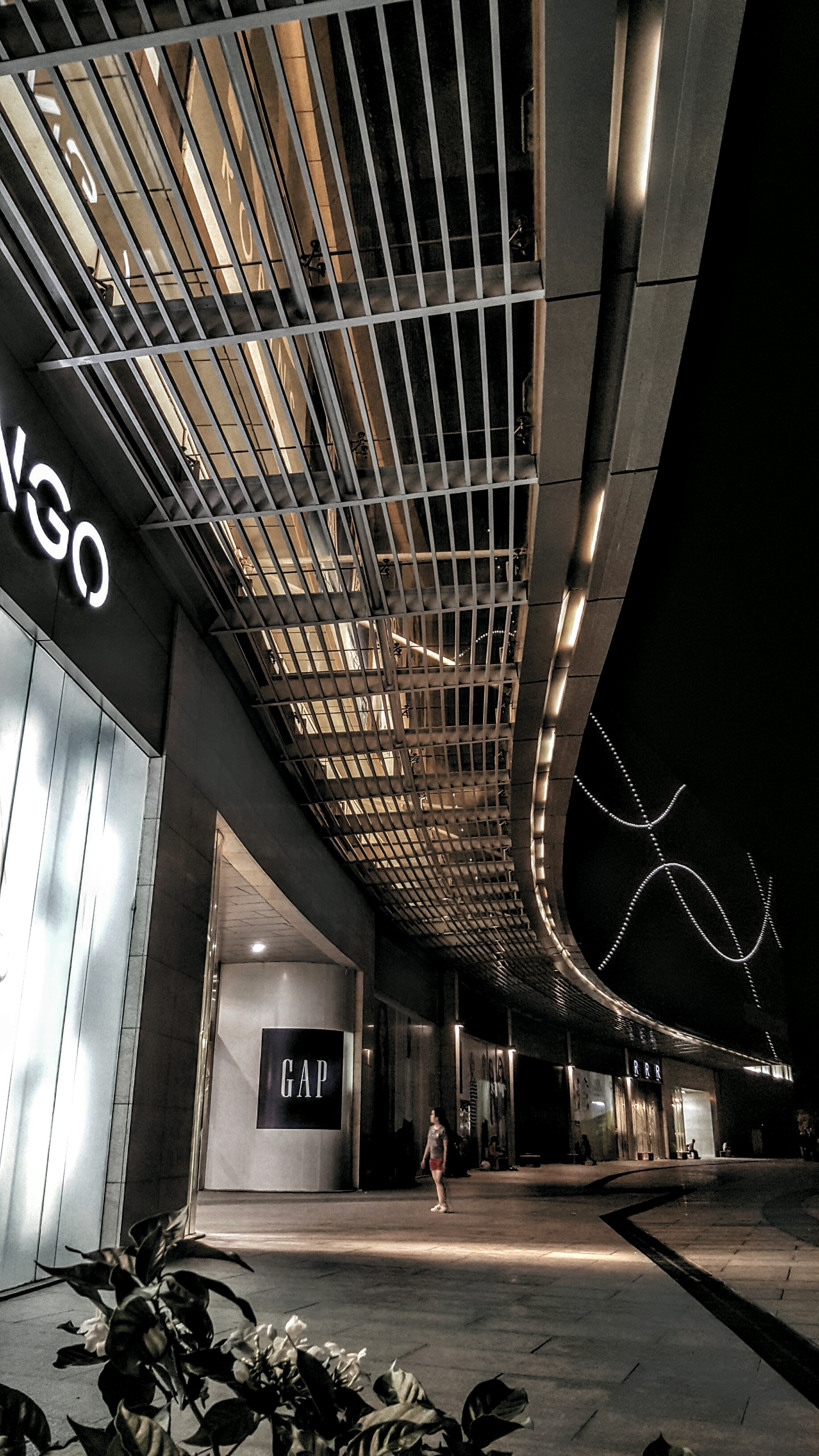
The mall pavement

=== Phase 2 ===
Due to the increasing demand for business and retailers, Phu My Hung Corporation invested additional funds in February 2019 to upgrade and expand Crescent Mall as part of the Phú Mỹ Hưng infrastructure upgrade plan. This expansion of the mall included phase 2 of Crescent Mall and an additional 24-story office building at the corner of Nguyễn Khắc Viện and Nguyễn Văn Linh initially known as Crescent Hub. It was completed in 2021 and officially known as Phú Mỹ Hưng Tower. The mall expanded an additional 12,000 m^{2} (130,000 sq ft) at the end of 2019.

In July 2020, the K-pop theme coffee brand SMTown Café opened its first and only location in Vietnam at the mall. However, it was closed in September 2023, after 3 years and 2 months.

=== Phase 3 ===
In the 2026 "Phú Mỹ Hưng 2.0" upgrade plan includes improvements to the Crescent District—specifically, renovating the lakeside promenade, constructing the Moonlight Bridge (Cầu Ánh Trăng) only for pedestrian next to Thầy Tiêu Bridge on Nguyễn Văn Linh Parkway, and Phase 3 of Crescent Mall. Phase 3 will further expanding the mall, and building a 40-story tower next to the Moonlight Bridge.

== Overall ==
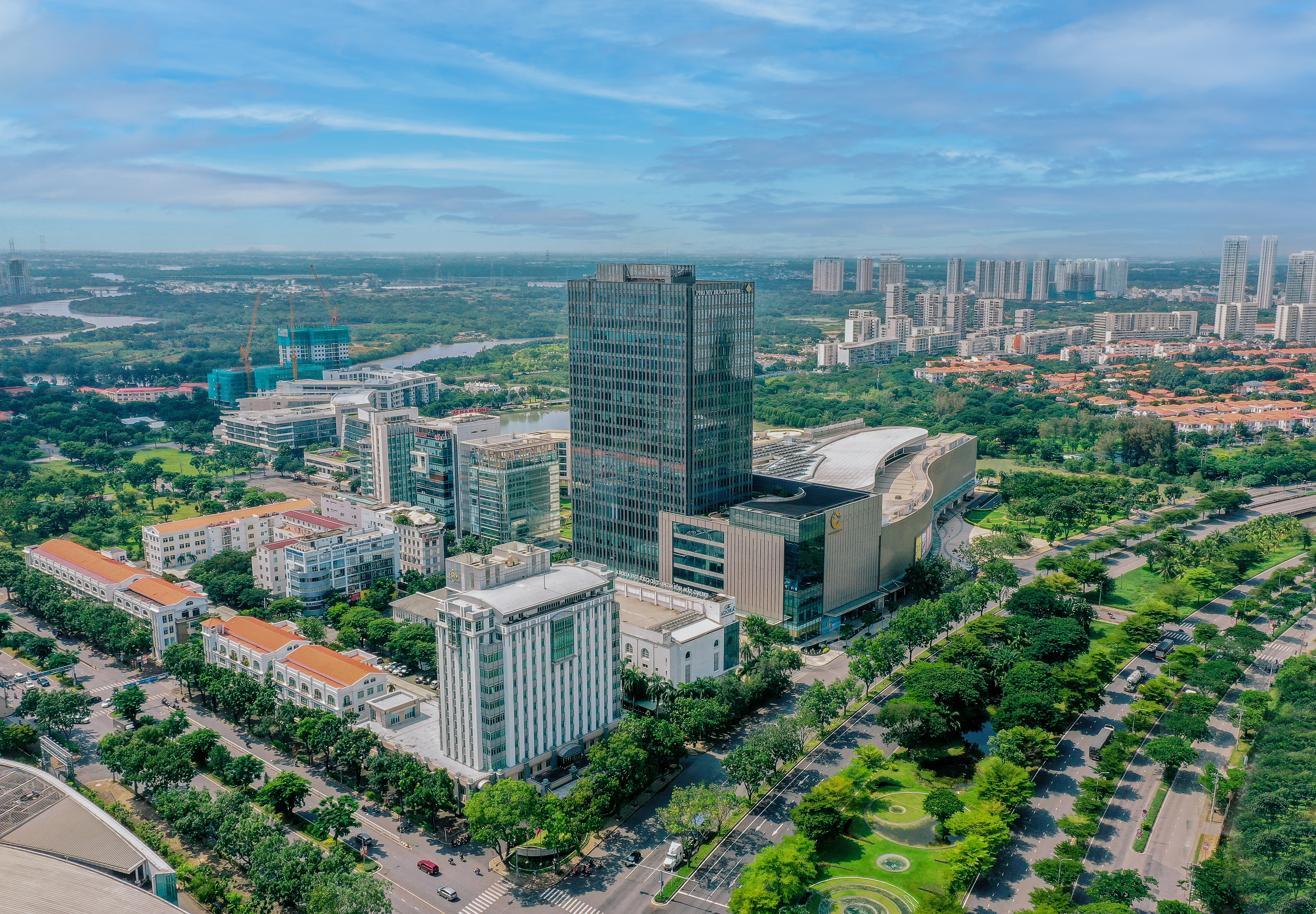
The Crescent complex seen from above in 2021

=== Crescent Mall ===
The design of Crescent Mall was said to be inspired by the concept of ruyi which is a symbol of good luck and fortune. This mall contains 45,000 m^{2} (480,000 sq ft) and 18,000 m^{2} (190,000 sq ft) net area of retail space for first and second phase, respectively.

=== Phú Mỹ Hưng Tower ===
Phú Mỹ Hưng Tower is a 24-storey LEED-certificated building directly connected to Crescent Mall, with main address is No. 8 Hoàng Văn Thái Street, it has a GFA of 31,200 m^{2} (7.7 acres) for office leasing, Low E Glass façade. Similar to Crescent Mall, first floor is marked as G, the sky garden is located at 7th floor, which is rooftop of the Crescent Mall. List of some notable tenants here area: Prudential Vietnam Headquarter (relocated from Saigon Trade Center), M_Service (MoMo), Phú Hưng Financial Group and subsidiaries, Con Cưng Corporation (concung.com)

== Retail ==
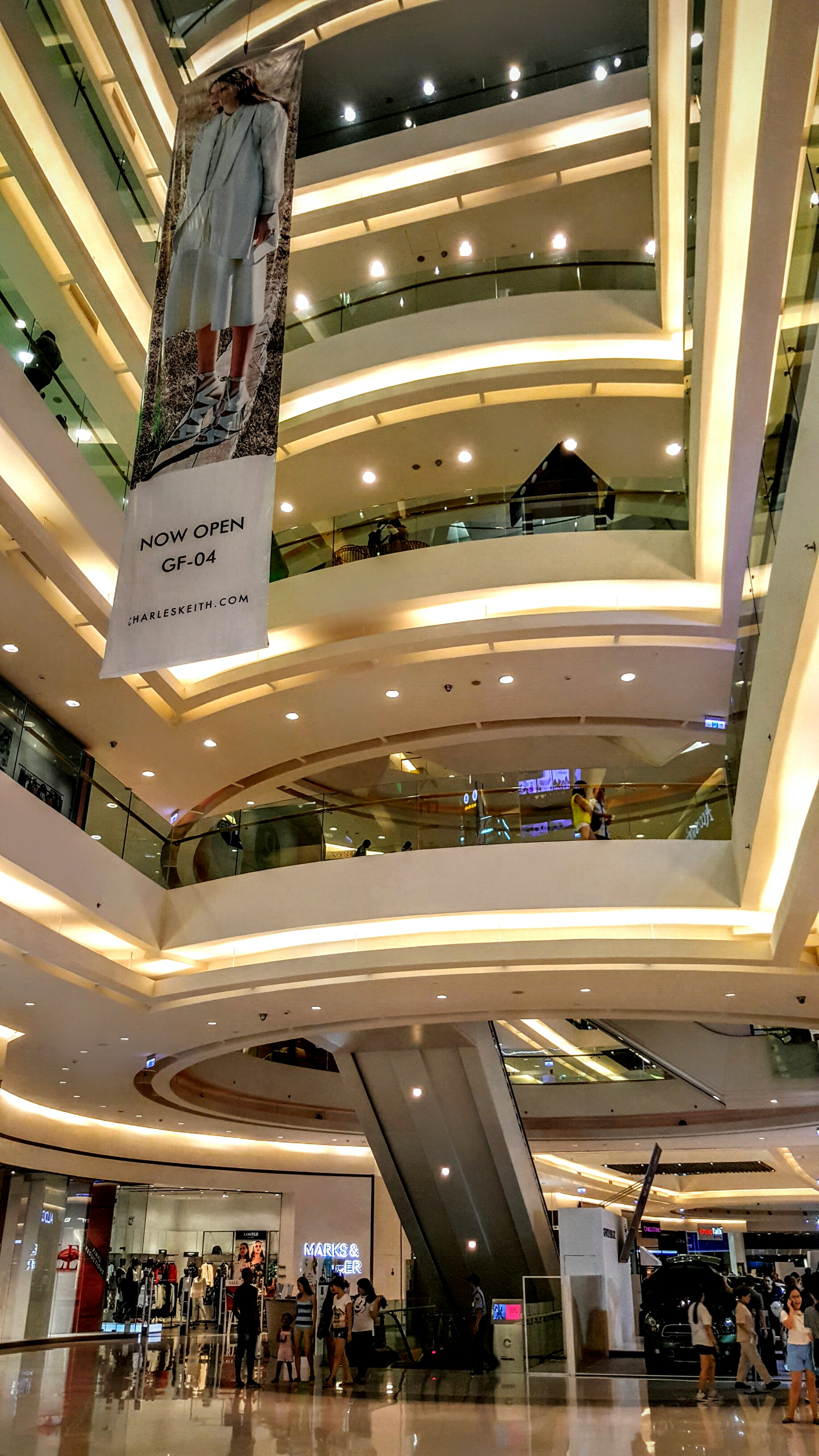
Crescent Mall Main Hall

It has a large variety of stores including international chains such as GAP and Tommy Hilfiger, numerous restaurants, a cinema, and a supermarket: Aeon Nguyễn Văn Linh Super Supermarket. There are numerous chain stores selling clothes and cosmetics, as well as gift and souvenir stores. Among the cafes are branches of Highlands Coffee and Wayne's Coffee.

Level	Anchor tenants
6	Haidilao, Crescent Wall, Việt Thương Music School
5	CGV, Crescent Wall, Lava Planrt, Photo Time, Timezone (with Booths), 88Miutea, Bắc Kim Thang Restauratnt, Chang Kang Kung, Chen Foods, C.Tao, Dairy Queen, KFC, Khao Lao, Kohaku Udon, Kohaku Sushi, Lotteria, Luk Puff, Mini Melts, Pappa Roti, Spicy Box, Sukiya, The Pizza Company, Trống Cơm Chảo Cá
4	Akemi, Balabala, Choo Choo Train, Coway, Elmich, Everon, Funnyland, Himalaya, Kymdan, Lock & Lock, My Home, My Kingdom, Ogawa, Pop Mart, Takara Tomy, Serta, Tefal, Xiaomi, Zwilling J. A. Henckels, A Dổi, Chickita, Don Chicken, Dookki, Genki Sushi, Long Wang, Machida Shoten, Meat & Meet, Pastamania, Shabuya, Spice Temple, Wulao, Yakiniku Like
3	Asics, Bose, Columbia Sportswear, Converse, Crocs, Mizuno, New Balance, Nike, Skechers, Vans, Discovery, Dunlopillo, Future World, Giordano, House of Luggage, JBL, Le Coq Sportif, Li-Ning, SuperSports, Under Armour, Mắt Việt, Megane Price, Miniso, Morra, Native, Owndays, Phương Nam Bookstore, Philips, Samsonite, Samsung, Sony, Aburi-en, King BBQ, Kiwami Ramen & Gyoza Bar, Ngõ Sài Gòn, Poulet, Sizzler, Tàu Hủ Xe Lam
2	Adidas Originals, Aldo, Birkenstock, Charles & Keith, Charles Tyrwhitt, Cole Haan, Daniel Wellington, Dan John, Dr. Martens, Garmin, Geox, Kelly Bui, Levi's, Lyn, MLB by F&F, PNJ, The Body Shop, Titan, Typo, United Colors of Benetton, Wilson, Zara, Basta Hiro Italian Restaurant, Botejyu, Gyu Shige, Morico, Wayne's Coffee
G (Ground / First floor)	Armani (Giorgio Armani & Armani Exchange), Banana Republic, Brooks Brothers, Calvin Klein, Chanel, Dyson, Escentials, GAP, Gucci Beauty, Guerlain, Hermès Beauty, H&M, Issey Miyake, Karl Lagerfeld, Kiehl's, Lacoste, Mango, Massimo Dutti, Narciso Rodriguez, Pandora, Prada Beauty, Shiseido, Sisley, Solférino Paris, Sulwhasoo, Tommy Hilfiger, Valentino Beauty, ViinRiic Galleries de Parfums, Van Cleef & Arpels, YSL Beauty, Zara, The Edit by DAFC, Muji, Jaguar Land Rover, Azabu Sabo, Crispy Donut, Highlands Coffee, KOI Thé, L'Usine, Maison Marou Station, Paris Baguette, Phúc Long, San Fu Lou, Som Tum Thai, Sushi Hokkaido Sachi, Tous les Jours
B1	AEON Supermarket, Oh!Some, Chợ Lớn Electronics, 201 Hair Design, Boost Juice Bars, BreadTalk, Chateraise, Kiến Huy Farm, Face Wash Fox, Matsukiyo, Photoism, TiniWorld
B2	Parking (LuxGems at B2)
B3	Parking (LuxGems at B2)

== See also ==
- Diamond Plaza
- Saigon Centre
