= Dippin' Dots =

Ice cream brand

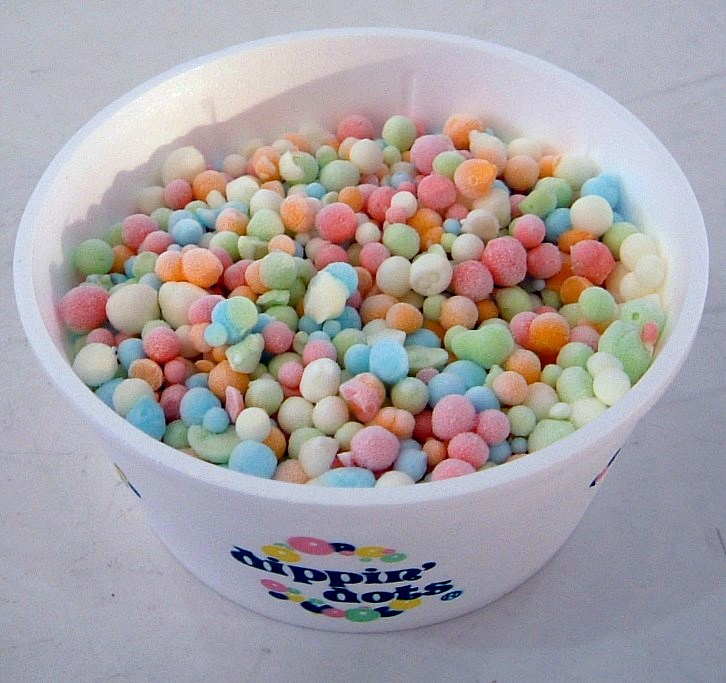
- Dippin' Dots Rainbow Flavored Ice Cream
- Type: Ice cream
- Inventor: Curt Jones
- Inception: 1988
- Manufacturer: Dippin' Dots, LLC
- Available: Yes
- Models: Retail locations (co-branded kiosks, stores), mobile vending (food trucks, carts), and wholesale impulse freezers
- Website: https://www.dippindots.com/

Dippin' Dots is a beaded ice cream invented by Curt Jones in 1988. The confection is created by flash freezing ice cream mix in liquid nitrogen. The snack is made by Dippin' Dots, Inc., headquartered in Paducah, Kentucky. Dippin' Dots are sold in 14 countries, including Honduras and Luxembourg.

Because the product requires storage at temperatures below −40 °F (−40 °C), it is not sold in most grocery stores, as most cannot meet such extreme cooling requirements.

Dippin' Dots are sold in individual servings at franchised outlets. Many are in stadiums, arenas, shopping malls, and in vending machines, though there are also locations at public aquariums, zoos, museums, and theme parks.

== History ==
Dippin' Dots was founded in Paducah, Kentucky, in 1988. Curt Jones began the company in his parents' garage. It was originally invented as cow feed when Jones, who specialized in cryogenics, was trying to make efficient fodder for farm animals.

In 1992, Dippin' Dots received U.S. patent 5,126,156 for its ice cream making process, and in 1996 unsuccessfully sued its main competitor, Mini Melts, for patent infringement. In 2007, the U.S. Patent and Trademark Office ruled against Dippin' Dots because the process of creating the ice cream was "obvious" rather than proprietary.

Japan became the first international licensee of Dippin' Dots in 1995.

On November 4, 2011, the company filed for Chapter 11 bankruptcy protection, after failing to reach an agreement with their lender, Regions Bank. According to The New York Times, the bank had been trying to foreclose on Dippin' Dots for over a year.

On May 18, 2012, U.S. Bankruptcy Court approved the purchase of the company by Scott Fischer and his father Mark Fischer. The Fischers had co-founded Chaparral Energy in Oklahoma City, Oklahoma. They retained company founder Curt Jones as CEO, and planned to expand from 1,600 sales locations to 2,000 locations, keeping the production and headquarters in Paducah, where it employed 165 people.

In mid-2014, the company purchased gourmet popcorn franchisor Doc Popcorn, which had about 100 stores. On February 10, 2015, the company announced they would co-brand stores with both products. The 1,000-square-foot stores would sell Dippin' Dots and Doc Popcorn, with a common selling counter, register and employees.

In May 2022, J & J Snack Foods Corp. announced its intent to acquire Dippin’ Dots for $222 million, and the acquisition was closed on June 21, 2022.

== Charity work ==
Dippin' Dots has sponsored the "Celebrity Grand Slam Paddle Jam" celebrity table tennis tournament in Hollywood, whose proceeds benefit St. Jude Children's Research Hospital in Memphis, Tennessee.

The company is a contributor to the charity Give Kids the World Village in Kissimmee, Florida.

== DD Cryogenics ==
Dippin' Dots are stored and transported at –40° Fahrenheit (–40 °C), which is colder than most frozen foods require. The company's development of ultra-low-temperature freezers, proper storage and transportation got the company involved from about 1988 with selling their equipment for other uses, such as preserving microbiological cultures for fermentation.

To expand this side business after the 2011 bankruptcy and sale, a subsidiary company, Dippin' Dot (DD) Cryogenics LLC, was established in May 2019. DD Cryogenics did contract freezing and pelletizing of microbiological products out of their Paducah plant. In August 2020 a new dedicated 6,000 square foot, US$3.2 million manufacturing plant came online in Paducah.

Their services now include contract design and manufacturing, cryogenic processors, and ultra-low-temperature freezers.

=== Vaccine storage ===
DD's creation of ultra-low-temperature freezing for their own food products, and commercial freezers going as low as −122 °F (−86 °C), sparked interest when vaccines were developed for COVID-19 that required storage at -94 °F (-70 °C). Pharmacists and distributors of those vaccines reached out for those freezers.
