= Steve Gu =

- Education: Duke University
- Occupation: CEO
- Known for: AiFi
- Title: Co-founder and CEO of AiFi

Steve Gu is an entrepreneur, computer vision scientist, author and the Co-founder and former CEO of AiFi, an AI technology company providing autonomous store technology for retailers and brands, recognized as an Amazon Go rival by Fortune and CNBC. Gu has his PhD from Duke University in computer science, advised by Carlo Tomasi.

== Career ==
Gu co-launched AiFi in 2016 with co-founder Ying Zheng. The name "AiFi" was chosen based on Gu's stated goal to make artificial intelligence or AI as available as WiFi. Gu and Zheng used AI in combination with off-the-shelf cameras. Gu said to create a platform that both retrofitted and newly-built stores could use to turn automated and provide checkout-free experience for customers. Gu's company launched autonomous stores in the US, UK, France, Dubai, Poland and China with brands including Carrefour, Majid al Futtaim, Morrisons, Verizon and Zabka.

Before founding AiFi, Gu worked on the Google Glass at Google X in Advanced R&D, Rapid Technology Evaluation, as well as a research scientist at Apple on Force Touch and haptic technology.

Gu is also an author of the book Black Technology published in 2017, in which Gu and other authors from Silicon Valley showcased 21 new technologies from deep learning and AI to human augmentation.

== Awards ==
In 2020, Technology Innovators named Gu one of the Top 50 Artificial Intelligence CEOs. In 2018, Gu and AiFi won Nvidia Corporation’s Inception AI award for the best enterprise startup and shared a $1 million prize with two other winners.
