= Lawrence S. Ting Memorial School =

- Vietnamese: Trường Đinh Thiện Lý
- Junior school: 80 Nguyễn Đức Cảnh, Ho Chi Minh City; Senior school: 01 Raymondienne, Ho Chi Minh City

Information
- Type: Fee-charging with scholarships available
- Opened: Junior school: 2008; Senior school:2022
- Founder: Phu My Hung Corporation
- Authority: Ho Chi Minh City’s People Committee
- Principal: Trương Tinh Hà
- Teaching staff: 124
- Grades: Junior school: 6-8; Senior school: 9-12
- Gender: Mixed
- Age: 11 to 18
- Enrolment: 1,968 (2025/26)
- Average class size: 30
- School fees: ₫138,150,000 - ₫186,110,000
- Website: lsts.edu.vn/en

Lawrence S. Ting School (LSTS), also known as Trường Đinh Thiện Lý (Dinh Thien Ly School) in Vietnamese, is a junior and senior high school located in Phu My Hung urban area, Ho Chi Minh City, Vietnam. Lawrence S. Ting Memorial School was established in honor of Lawrence Ting, the founder of CT&D Group of Taiwan.

LSTS is a non-for-profit school for the Vietnamese. LSTS has 7 grades (4 grades for junior high school and 3 grades for senior high school). The first academic year was 2008. LSTS has a campus size of 2 hectares and is located right next to the Saigon South International School. In 2011, LSTS completed its second phase expansion with an addition of new buildings and facilities. As of 2025/26, the school has an enrolment of 1,968 students. The school was reported to be oversubscribed in 2017.

In 2010, Microsoft Corporation chose LSTS as the first Microsoft Innovative School in Vietnam. Faculty members of LSTS participate in Microsoft's Innovative School Partnership training programs at various locations around the world.
