= Chateraise =

Japanese confectionery and bakery chain

Chateraise Co., Ltd.
- Type: Private
- Industry: Confectionery • Bakery • Patisserie • Ice cream parlor
- Founded: December 27, 1954; 71 years ago Kōfu, Yamanashi Prefecture, Japan
- Founder: Hiroshi Saito
- Headquarters: Hokuto, Yamanashi Prefecture, Japan
- Area served: Japan • Taiwan • Singapore • Hong Kong • Malaysia • Thailand • Indonesia • South Korea • Philippines • United Arab Emirates
- Key people: Takako Saito (President, Chateraise Holdings)
- Products: Cakes, pastries, ice cream, Japanese confectionery, wine
- Revenue: ▲JP¥161.3 billion (2025)
- Number of employees: Approximately 4,000 (consolidated, 2023)
- Parent: Chateraise Holdings Co., Ltd
- Website: www.chateraise.co.jp

Chateraise Co., Ltd, stylized as CHÂTERAISÉ (Japanese: シャトレーゼ株式会社, Hepburn: Shatorēze Kabushiki-gaisha), is a Japanese confectionery and bakery chain headquartered in Hokuto, Yamanashi Prefecture. As of 2025, it operates more than 890 stores in Japan and approximately 170 outlets overseas, primarily in Asia. The company produces Western-style and Japanese-style sweets, ice cream, and baked goods.

The brand name "Chateraise" is not an actual French word but a portmanteau of the French terms château (castle) and raisin (grape), intending to reflect the founder's family background in grape cultivation in Yamanashi Prefecture.

== History ==
Chateraise was founded in 1954 by Hiroshi Saito in Kōfu, Yamanashi Prefecture, originally under the name Amataro and selling Japanese confectionery such as imagawayaki. In the 1960s, the company began producing Western-style pastries and introduced ice-cream-filled cream puffs. In 1985, Chateraise officially adopted a direct-from-factory distribution model that aimed to eliminate intermediaries in the supply chain. The company established its Hakushu Factory in 1994, considered to be the largest confectionary factory in Japan at the time.

International expansion began with the opening of a store in Singapore in 2015. Subsequent markets included Taiwan, Hong Kong, Malaysia, Thailand, Indonesia, South Korea, the Philippines, and the United Arab Emirates. In 2020, a European production facility was opened in Tilburg, Netherlands. Founder Hiroshi Saito died on 10 August 2024 at the age of 90. He was succeeded by his daughter Takako Saito as president of the holding company.

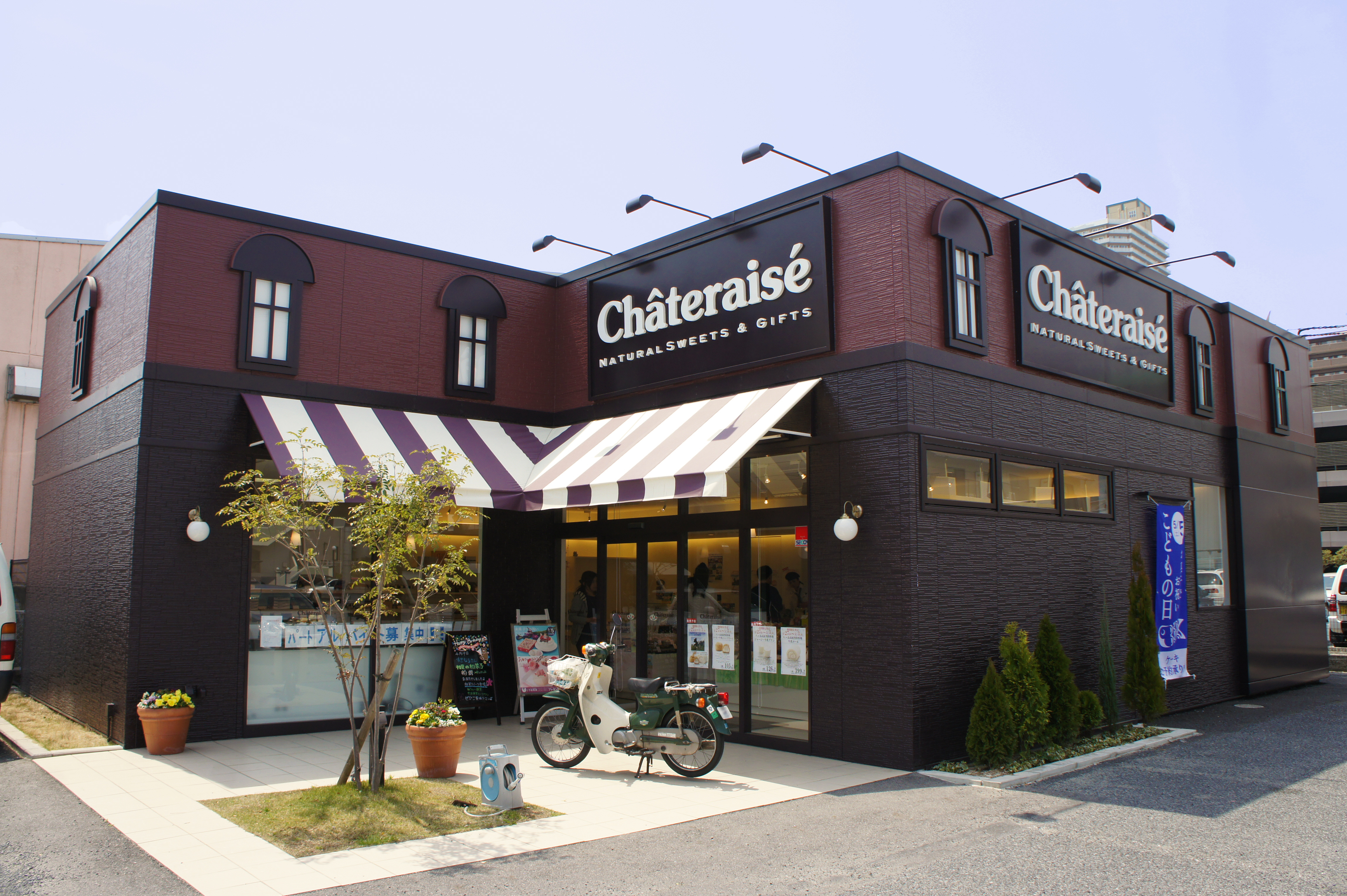
A Chateraise branch in Otsu City, Shiga, Japan

== Operations ==
Chateraise operates a vertically integrated supply chain, contracting directly with farmers for dairy, eggs, and fruit, and processing ingredients in company-owned factories before distribution to stores. In Japan, the chain introduced unmanned 24-hour stores in 2023 followed by an unmanned store in Singapore. The parent entity, Chateraise Holdings, also operates multiple wineries, hotels, golf courses, and ski resorts across the country.

== Products ==
While the selection varies across different stores, common products offered include fresh-cream cakes and whole cakes such as cream puffs, éclairs, baumkuchen, ice cream, Japanese confectionery, baked goods and breads as well as fruit wines produced at company-owned wineries.

A 'premium' in-store baking brand, Yatsudoki, was launched in 2021.

== Labor standards violation ==
In May 2025, the Kōfu Labor Standards Inspection Office referred Chateraise to public prosecutors for alleged violations of the Labor Standards Act, accusing the company of requiring multiple employees to work excessive overtime hours without proper compensation.
