= Lawrence Ting =

Taiwanese businessman (1939–2004)

- 丁善理
- Born: January 25, 1939; Qingdao, Republic of China
- Died: September 23, 2004 (aged 65); Taipei, Taiwan
- Occupation: Businessman
- Known for: Founder of Phu My Hung Corporation

Lawrence Ting Shan-li (Chinese: 丁善理; Vietnamese: Đinh Thiện Lý; January 25, 1939 – September 23, 2004) was a Taiwanese decorated soldier and businessman who became one of the largest foreign investors in Vietnam. As founder of Phu My Hung Corporation and Saigon South Urban Development Project, Ting was instrumental in the southward expansion of Ho Chi Minh City. Today, the neighborhood created by Ting has become “a new sustainable, inclusive, knowledge-based urban center.”

Ting received the Ho Chi Minh City Medal of Honor in 1993 and Certificates of Merit of the Government of Vietnam from the Prime Minister in 1997 and 2001. In the 2013 Harvard Business Review article The Big Idea, Building Sustainable Cities, John Macomber of Harvard Business School chose Phu My Hung's Saigon South Development Project as one of the leading sustainable urban development examples in the world. He was posthumously bestowed the Friendship Order from President Nguyen Minh Triet in December 2007.

Founded in 2008, Lawrence S. Ting School (Vietnamese: Trường THCS và THPT Đinh Thiện Lý) in Ho Chi Minh City, a private non-profit middle and high school, is named after him. In 2020, Taipei American School named its middle school Lawrence S. Ting Middle School in honor of Ting.

== Military career ==
Ting was a graduate of the Republic of China Military Academy of Taiwan in 1961. Ting was the First Captain of the Cadet Corp. and the head of the Academy's Cadet Honor Committee. He was sent to the US to receive further training at the United States Army Infantry School School and was one of few military officers from Taiwan who completed the US Army Ranger School in Fort Benning, Georgia. In 1964, he was awarded the National Defense Scholarship by the Ministry of National Defense of Taiwan for further graduate-level studies at Columbia University.

Ting received a Certificate of Merit from the Superintendent of Republic of China Military Academy in 1958 and a Certificate of Merit from the Chief of Army in 1968.

== Petrochemical career ==
In 1976, Lawrence Ting joined the China Gulf Plastics Group, a joint venture with Gulf Oil Corporation of the US. He rose through the ranks from Manager, Chief Plant Manager, to Executive Vice President. He later became president and equity partner of a number of subsidiary companies. At the encouragement of Ting Tsung Chao (T.T. Chao), founder of China Gulf Plastics Group, Ting ran for and was elected Chairman of Taiwan Plastics Industry Association. He served two terms for a total of 6 years (1988~1994). At the request of the government, Ting also served as a Director of the China External Trade Development Council. Ting was awarded a Merit Citation by the Minister of the Interior Wu Po-hsiung for services rendered.

== Re-entry of Olympic Games ==
Lawrence Ting was instrumental in negotiating the re-entry of Olympic Games for athletes from Taiwan. He served as the General Secretary for Chinese Taipei Fencing Association (3 terms, 1973~1980 and 1985~1989), promoting with much effort to secure Taiwan's membership in the International Fencing Federation. He also served as Vice Chairman of the R.O.C. Olympic Committee. In 1976, he assumed the position of Chief de Mission of the Games of the 21st Olympiad in Montreal. In 1981, Henry Hsu (徐亨), Shen Chia Minh (沈家銘)(zh) and Lawrence Ting, finally were able to secure the re-entry of Olympic Games under the name Chinese Taipei.

For his efforts, Ting received a Citation from President Chiang Kai-shek for outstanding leadership in international relations on sports events in 1974, and the Ministry of Education Gold Medal in Physical Sports in 1984.

== Other Awards ==
For other services rendered to the government, Ting received the Order of Hua Hsia (華夏三等獎章) in 1979.

In 1993, Ting was awarded an Honorary Certificate of Merit (榮譽狀) by President Lee Teng-hui, the chairman of KMT.

== Columbia Alumni Association of Taiwan ==
Lawrence Ting served as Secretary-General of the Columbia University Alumni Association of Taiwan for 6 years (1990~1996) and as the President of the Alumni Association for a further 6 years (1996~2003).

== R.O.C. Military Academy Alumni Foundation ==
Lawrence Ting and other alumni of the R.O.C. Military Academy established the R.O.C. Military Academy Alumni Foundation in 1989 and Ting served as its founding chairman from 1989 to 2004. Ting was named as Outstanding Alumni by the Central Military Institutes in 1990.

== Investments in Vietnam ==
Lawrence Ting was one of the earliest foreign investors in Vietnam since the Đổi Mới reform policy initiated in 1986, and launched a series of infrastructure project investments in Vietnam in 1989. He was the founding Chairman of a number of companies including CT&D Group, Phu My Hung Corporation, Tan Thuan Corporation and Hiep Phuoc Power Company.

Ting was awarded the Ho Chi Minh City Medal of Honor in 1993. He also received Certificates of Merit from the Prime Minister of Vietnam in 1997 and 2001; a Certificate of Merit from the Mayor of Ho Chi Minh City in 2003.

== Posthumous Honors ==
Lawrence Ting died in 2004. State President of Vietnam, Nguyen Minh Triet, awarded him, posthumously, Vietnam's Friendship Medal in December 2007. In Ho Chi Minh City, Phu My Hung Corporation's headquarter building was renamed Lawrence S. Ting building in memory of its chairman in 2005. The Lawrence Ting Memorial Fund was set up in Vietnam in 2005. Lawrence S. Ting Memorial School was established in his name in 2008. A sports field of the Fay School of Southborough, Massachusetts was renamed Ting Field in remembrance of him in 2005. Lawrence Ting Charity Walk is held every year since 2006 in memory of Ting, and over 15,000 people joined the walk in 2019. This charity event so far has raised approximately US$1.68 million with around 212,800 participants as of 2020. On September 1, 2020, Taipei American School named its middle school Lawrence S. Ting Middle School in honor of him.

== Legacy ==
=== Lawrence S. Ting Scholarships ===
In remembrance of Ting, academic scholarships named after him are offered to high school and college students in Vietnam and in Taiwan by Lawrence S. Ting Foundation and schools listed below. Ting was devoted to education and established Saigon South International School and Saigon South People-Founded School in Vietnam in 1997.

==== Scholarships offered by the scholarship program of Lawrence S. Ting Foundation (Vietnam) ====
Lawrence S. Ting Foundation (LSTF) was established in December 2005 in remembrance of Ting. In March 2006, the first 140 Lawrence S. Ting Scholarships amounting to VND 850 million were granted by the foundation to students of high schools and universities in Ho Chi Minh City. Other schools joined the scholarship program subsequently, and the high schools and universities receiving scholarships for the 2020–2021 academic year are:

- Vietnamese High Schools:
  - Nguyen Trai High School (Kon Tum Province)
  - Le Loi High School (Quang Tri Province)
  - Hue National High School (Thua Thien-Hue Province)
  - Tran Quoc Tuan High School (Quang Ngai Province)
  - Luong Van Chanh High School (Phu Yen Province)
  - Vo Van Kiet High School (Vinh Long Province)
- Vietnamese Universities:
  - Hanoi University of Science and Technology (Hanoi City)
  - Vietnam National University, Hanoi (Hanoi City)
  - Hanoi Law University (vi) (Hanoi City)
  - Tay Nguyen University (vi) (Dak Lak Province)
  - Hue University - University of Sciences (vi) (Thua Thien-Hue Province)
  - Phan Chau Trinh University (vi) (Quang Nam Province)
  - The University of Da Nang (UD) - University of Science and Technology (vi) (Da Nang City)
  - Vietnam National University, Ho Chi Minh City - University of Science (HCM City)
  - Vietnam National University, Ho Chi Minh City - University of Technology (HCM City)
  - Vietnam National University, Ho Chi Minh City - University of Social Sciences and Humanities (HCM City)
  - HCMC University of Architecture (HCM City)
  - HCMC University of Law (HCM City)
  - University of Economics Ho Chi Minh City (HCM City)
  - University of Medicine and Pharmacy at HCMC (HCM City)
  - Ho Chi Minh City University of Education (HCM City)
  - National College of Education HCMC (HCM City)
  - Cao Thang Technical College (vi) (HCM City)
  - Nguyen Tat Thanh University (vi) (HCM City)
  - Vietnam National University, Ho Chi Minh City - An Giang University (An Giang Province)

Besides awarding scholarships directly to students on its own annual ceremony, LSTF also grants indirect scholarships through partnership with other foundations and charity organizations across the country, including the National Fund for Vietnamese Children, Ho Chi Minh City Fund for the Poor, Vu A Dinh Scholarship Fund, Ho Chi Minh City Sponsoring Association for Poor Patients, The Association for the support of people with Disabilities and Orphans of HCMC, and Vietnam Association for Promoting Education of 63 cities/provinces.

Up to September 2020, nearly 117,000 scholarships, with a total value of VND 125 billion (US$5.4 million) have been provided by LSTF.

==== Scholarships offered by Saigon South International School (Vietnam) ====
Starting in the 2005–2006 academic year, Saigon South International School (SSIS) in Ho Chi Minh City chooses a Vietnamese student, who has demonstrated a strong commitment to academic excellence, proficiency in English, embodies SSIS core values, demonstrates an interest in global and international affairs along with a willingness to serve others by bettering his/her country. SSIS offers this student a 3-year renewable scholarship in Lawrence S. Ting's name. Only grade 10 students from a Vietnamese school may apply.

==== Scholarships offered by Lawrence S. Ting School (Vietnam) ====
Lawrence S. Ting School (LSTS) in Ho Chi Minh City provides two types of scholarships to her students:

- Lawrence S. Ting Scholarships for Studiousness are given to students with excellent academic performances that meet certain income eligibility. Students granted with scholarships will be exempted from all tuition fees, and supported wholly or in part in subsistence expenses when studying at LSTS.
- Lawrence S. Ting Scholarships for Encouragement are honorable rewards for students with outstanding academic performances when studying at LSTS. The scholarships are granted each semester based on the academic performances of the students.

==== Scholarships offered by the R.O.C. Military Academy (Taiwan) ====
Two types of Lawrence S. Ting Scholarships are given to members of R.O.C Military Academy (ROCMA) in Kaohsiung, Taiwan each year:

- Most Improvement in English Language Proficiency
- Sun Tzu's Art of War Debate Competition Champion.

Ting was a graduate of the R.O.C. Military Academy in 1961 and subsequently became the founding chairman of the R.O.C. Military Academy Alumni Foundation in 1989. He set up the scholarships to encourage cadets of ROCMA to achieve proficiency in English and to master Sun Tzu's Art of War military strategies. Ting received Outstanding Alumni Award of R.O.C. Central Military Institute and Academy Alumni Association in 1990.

=== Charity Walk ===
The Lawrence S. Ting Charity Walk is a charity walk event to raise fund for the poor and needy people in Ho Chi Minh City. Lawrence Ting Charity Walk was first set up in 2006 in memory of Ting. It has since become of one of the largest charity walks in Vietnam. Lawrence Ting Charity Walk is held in the Phu My Hung New City Center in District 7 (Q7), of Ho Chi Minh City. The walking course is approximately 4 km.

All funds raised from the event are donated to the Funds for the Poor for the nearby districts and other charity funds.

Over 12,000 people participated in the walk in 2008. Over 15,000 people participated in 2009.

Many Vietnamese and foreign corporations participate and raise funds for this event. Corporations such as Tan Thuan Corporation, Hiep Phuoc Power Company, Pepsi Vietnam, Sino-Pacific Construction Consultancy, CX Technology, AA Corporation, Mei Linh Taxi, Phu Hung Securities, Fubon Financial Holding Co. Insurance and many others all have participated in this event.

From 2006 to 2023, the Lawrence S. Ting Charity Walk has raised over VND 44 billion, approximately US$1,700,000, for the poor.
