= Freshmarket =

Polish convenience store chain

- Type: Franchise
- Industry: Retail
- Founded: 2009; 17 years ago
- Defunct: 2019
- Fate: Dissolved, all stores changed to Żabka
- Headquarters: Warsaw, Poland
- Number of locations: 16
- Area served: Poland
- Website: freshmarket.pl

Freshmarket was a retail chain operated by Żabka Polska in Poland. There were 16 stores across Poland. The retail turnover was about EUR 330 million in 2014. The shops changed to Żabka by the end of 2019.

== History ==
The retailer was founded in 2009 by Polish entrepreneur Jacek Roszyk, then chairman of Żabka Polska. The first retail store was open in 2009, in Leszno. In 2011, Freshmarket retail stores received the prize of Consumer's Laurel as the Discovery of the Year. In 2011, Freshmarket was granted the label Market of the Year, based on a poll conducted by monthly business journal Wiadmości Handlowe. The same year, the chain received the following awards: Największa Jakość (Highest Quality) and Złote Godło QI 2011 for providing the highest quality of service. In 2013, the retail chain was once again nominated for the Market of the Year award. The shops are about to change to Żabka to end of 2019.

Presently, the Freshmarket retail chain controls currently 16 proximity convenience stores. The chain, owned by Żabka Polska, has four distribution centres in Plewiska (south-west of Poznań), Tychy, Nadarzyn and Pruszcz Gdański.

As convenience stores, Freshmarket retail points sell consumer packaged goods and food stuff ranges extending to ready meals, hot snacks and soft drinks via self-service checkouts, open seven days a week from 06:00 to 23:00, located in city centres and suburbs.

== Services ==
Apart from consumer retail, Freshmarket provides its customers with the opportunity to pay bills, send lottery tickets, buy "pay-and-go" mobile phone packages and receive debit card cashback. Freshmarket stores also contain FreshCafe café counters, offering coffee and snacks.

== Gallery ==
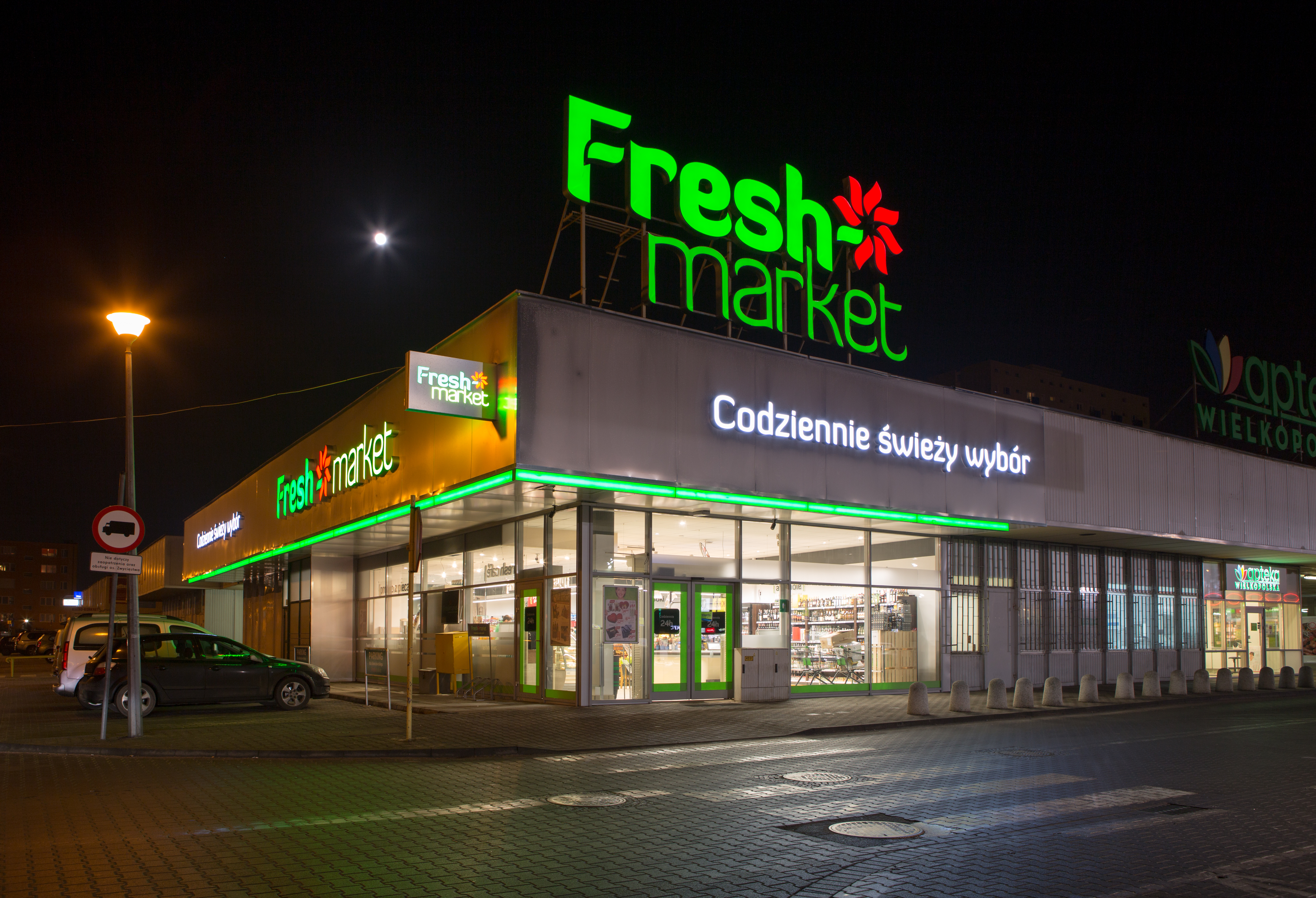
A Freshmarket store at night

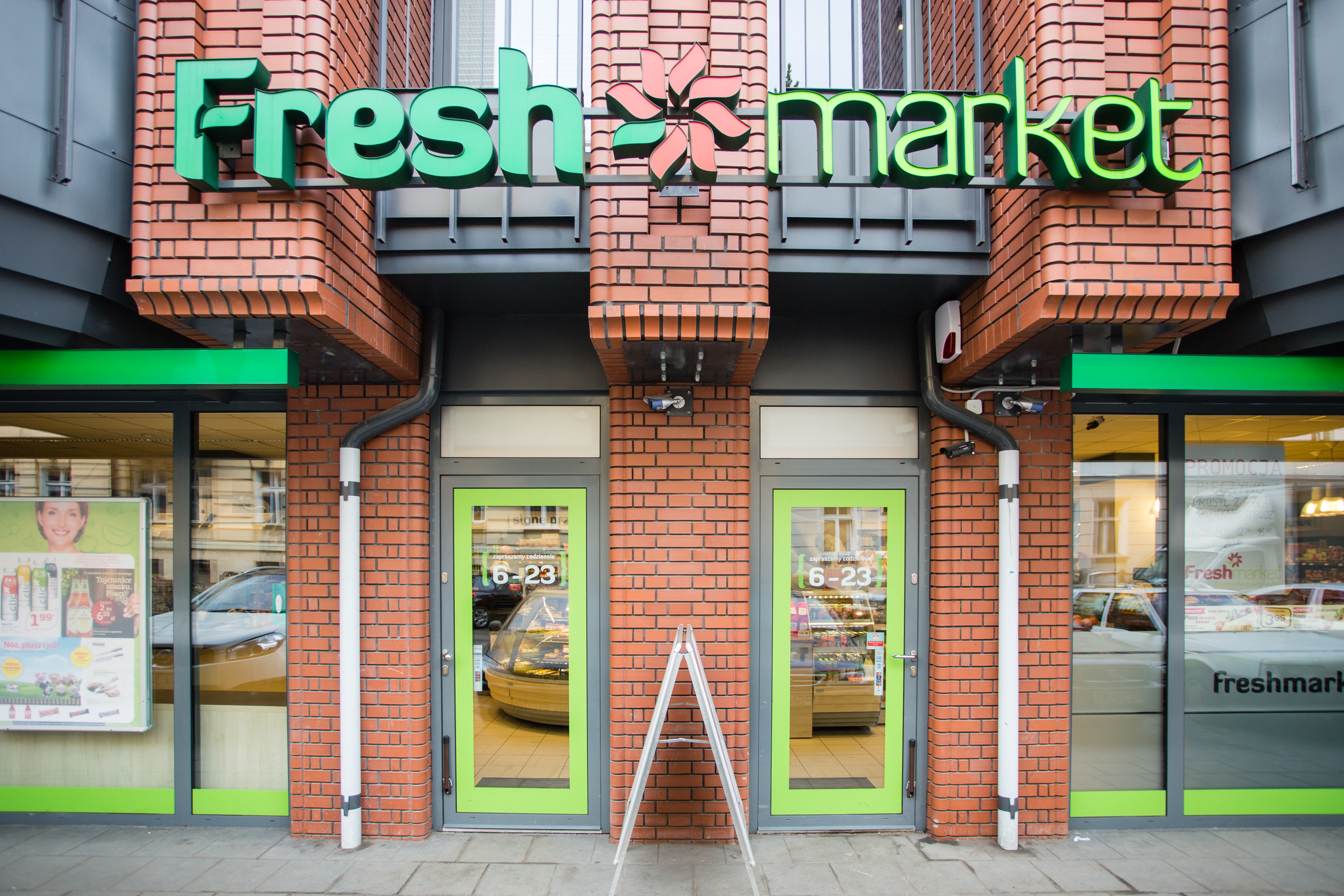
A Freshmarket store front with logo

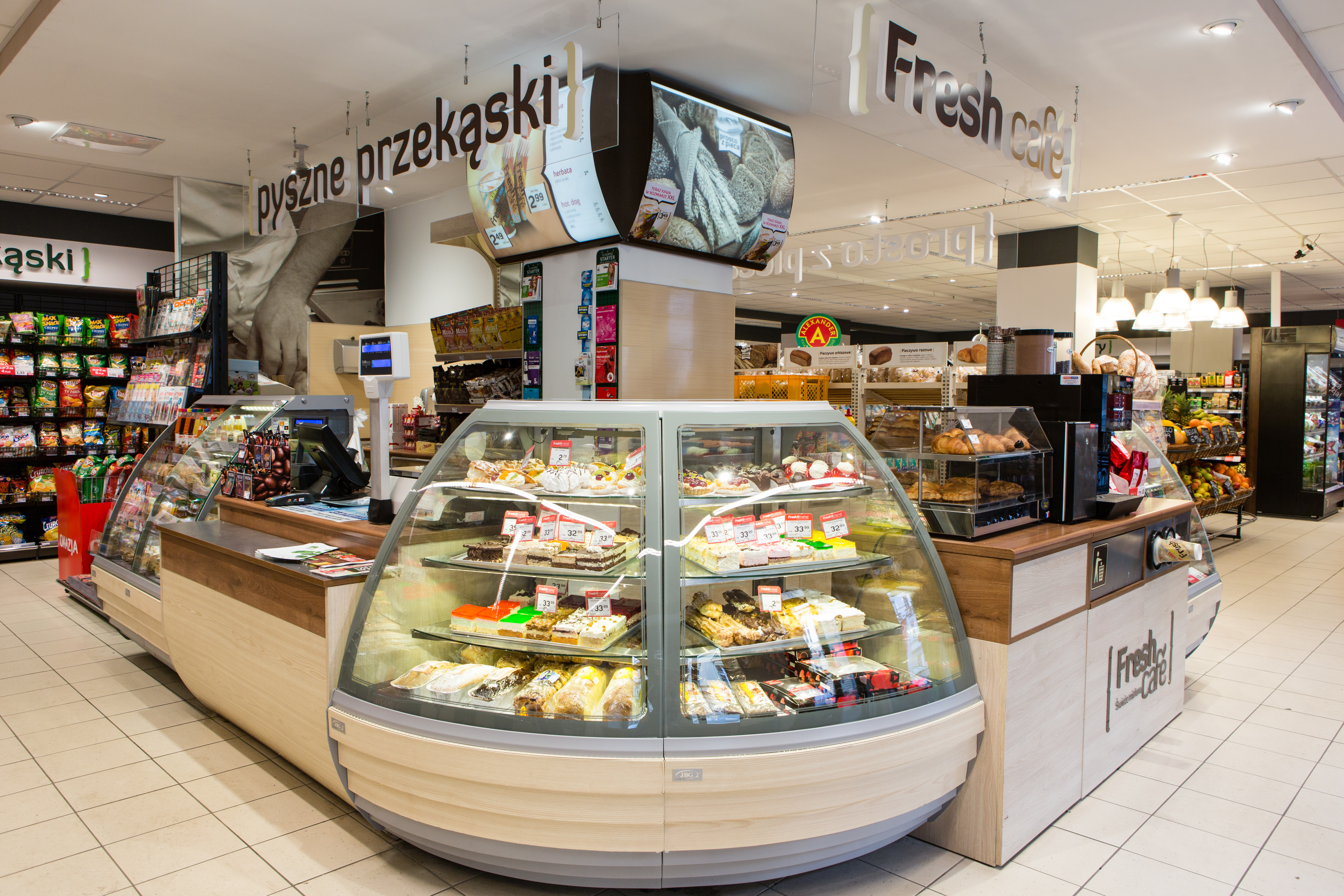
A Freshmarket store interior assortment and FreshCafe stand
