= Wayne's Coffee =

Swedish-based coffeehouse chain

Wayne & Margaretas Coffee AB

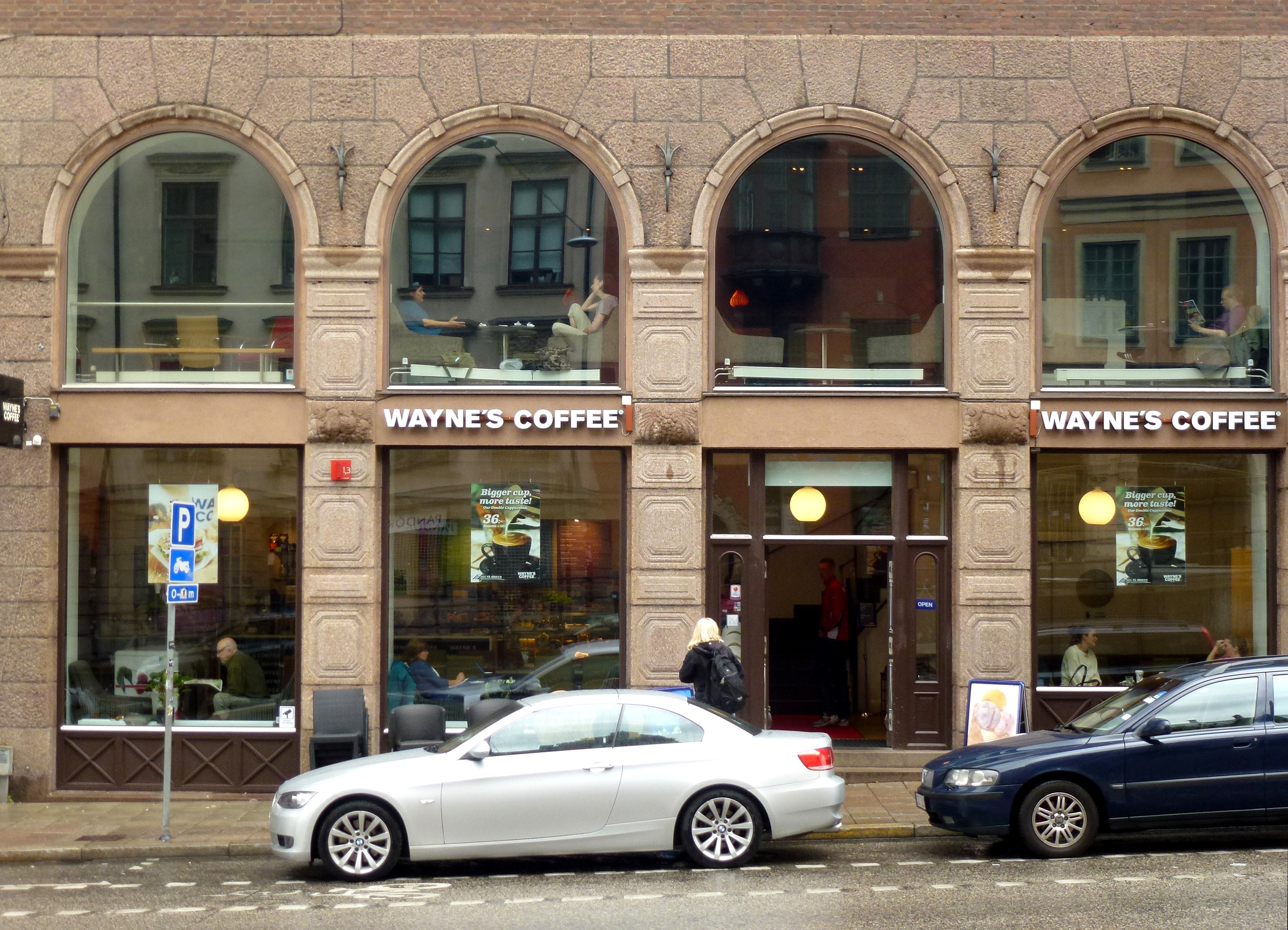
- Wayne's Coffee in Stockholm
- Type: Private
- Industry: Restaurants
- Founded: 17 December 1994; 31 years ago in Stockholm, Sweden
- Parent: Tank & Rast mbH
- Website: www.waynescoffee.com

Waynes, formerly known as Wayne's Coffee is a Swedish-based coffeehouse chain founded in Stockholm in 1994. It is now owned by Tank & Rast, and through its franchising model, it has coffeehouses in multiple countries in Europe and Asia.

== Overview ==
Wayne's Coffee was founded in 1994 in Stockholm, Sweden with the aim to offer an authentic Swedish fika experience. Wayne's Coffee is certified organic by KRAV in Sweden and the Rainforest Alliance internationally. Hailed as the "Swedish version of Starbucks," Wayne's Coffee introduced a franchise model in 1997 that enabled it to expand to 150 locations in eight countries.

In 2018, Wayne's Coffee was bought by German motorway services company Tank & Rast. Founder Anders Stål was subsequently replaced as Wayne's Coffee CEO by Mats Hörnell. In 2017, Wayne's Coffee won Svenska Franchise Föreningen's (The Swedish Franchise Association) Franchise Chain of the Year award.

== Locations ==
=== Europe ===
Wayne's Coffee has over 50 coffeehouses in Sweden, and the coffeehouses aim to have similar styling throughout the country. In 1999, Wayne's Coffee opened up coffeehouses in Finland, the first country outside Sweden to get Wayne's Coffee branches. Wayne's Coffee had around locations in Finland until 2012, when franchisee Restamax (now known as NoHo Partners) gave up their licence to operate under the Wayne's Coffee brand name. Later in the year, Wayne's Coffee opened new coffeehouses in Finland, including in the Matkus shopping center in Kuopio and Tampere.

In December 2017, Wayne's Coffee opened its first coffeehouse in the United Kingdom in Kensington, London. In 2018, it opened a branch in Ilford. In 2019, Wayne's Coffee opened a location in Manchester, their first in Northern England. In the same year, Wayne's Coffee started importing tea from the London Tea Exchange, who are believed to be the world's largest premium tea company.

In Europe, Wayne's Coffee also has coffeehouses in Norway, Germany, the Netherlands, and Cyprus.

=== Asia ===
In 2010, Wayne's Coffee opened up a store in Riyadh, Saudi Arabia. In 2018, Wayne's Coffee opened a coffeehouse in Ho Chi Minh City, Vietnam. It was the first Wayne's coffeehouse in Asia (excluding the Middle East). By the end of 2018, Wayne's had seven stores in Vietnam. In 2019, Wayne's Coffee opened up a store in Shanghai, China. In Asia, Wayne's Coffee also has coffeehouses in Jordan and Oman.

== See also ==
- List of coffeehouse chains
- Coffee in Sweden
