= Saigon South International School =

- Trường Quốc Tế Nam Sài Gòn
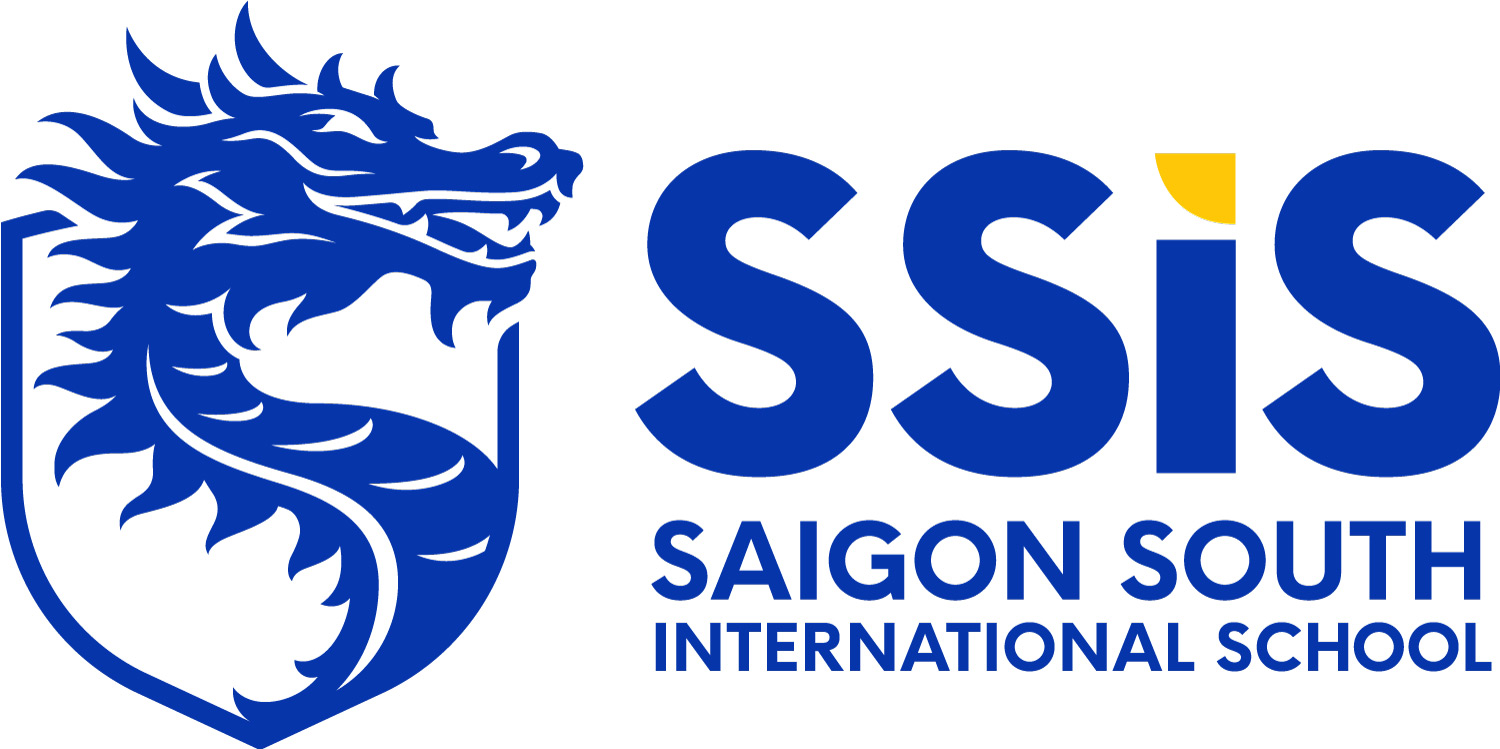

Location
- 78 Nguyễn Đức Cảnh; Tân Hưng, Ho Chi Minh City; Vietnam; 10.7238°N 106.7090°E

Information
- Type: Private non-profit international school
- Motto: Connecting Learning to Life
- Established: 1997
- Founder: Lawrence Ting
- Principal: Dr. Catriona Moran (HOS); Dan Kerr(AHOS); Melanie Sylvester (ES); Liz Tucker (MS); Daniel Smith (HS)
- Headmaster: Dr. Catriona Moran
- Faculty: 113
- Grades: EC-12
- Gender: Co-ed
- Enrollment: 1550
- Colors: Blue, white, and yellow
- Athletics: SSIS Dragons
- Mascot: Dragons
- Accreditation: AP, IB, WASC, CIS
- Newspaper: Xixlo
- Affiliations: Western Association of Schools and Colleges, East Asian Council of Overseas Schools, National Association of Independent Schools, the Southeast Asia Student Activities Conference, and Mekong River International Schools Association.
- Website: www.ssis.edu.vn

Saigon South International School (SSIS) is an international school in Ho Chi Minh City offering a degree program based on US standards for the Early Childhood - Grade 12. It offers both the IB diploma programme and AP coursework and is fully accredited by the Western Association of Schools and Colleges. The school is also a member of East Asian Council of Overseas Schools, National Association of Independent Schools, the Southeast Asia Student Activities Conference (SEASAC), and Mekong River International Schools Association (MRISA).

It is located in The Hillview District of Phú Mỹ Hưng, District 7, Ho Chi Minh City.

== Profile ==
Saigon South International School was founded in 1997 by the Phu My Hung Corporation to accommodate an increasing demand for American education by both residents and expatriate families. SSIS is located in the Phu My Hung Urban Area, two and a half miles south of the current city center - District 1, Ho Chi Minh City, Vietnam. SSIS is owned by the Phu My Hung Corporation but operates as a not-for-profit entity. A three-member school board governs the school in consultation with the Phu My Hung Corporation.

SSIS enrolls over 1,500 students from over 48 countries. Most teachers come from North America, Australia, and the United Kingdom. Over 72% hold advanced educational degrees, and the average years of teaching experience is 18 years. SSIS offers an American standards-based curriculum, augmented by the Advanced Placement (AP) Program and the International Baccalaureate Diploma Programme (IBDP), in high school. SSIS students also have one of the highest average IBDP points in Ho Chi Minh City, and average more than 6 points higher than the worldwide average.

== Facilities ==
Saigon South International School has a 6-hectare (15-acre) campus with five main buildings that contain over 1,500 students in Early Childhood 3 (EC3) – Grade 12. The newer purpose-built middle school and high school STEAM design center, completed in 2024, added over 18,000 sqm of innovative learning spaces. August 2025 the refurbished upper elementary opened, which includes an entire floor dedicated to STEAM with art classrooms and a makerspace for robotics and design projects, flexible classrooms, a new library, a drama room, and the only air-conditioned pool in Ho Chi Minh City.

The outside playing fields have three soccer fields and separate play areas for the early childhood program and elementary students.
