= Unmanned store =

Retail concept in which no employees staff a store

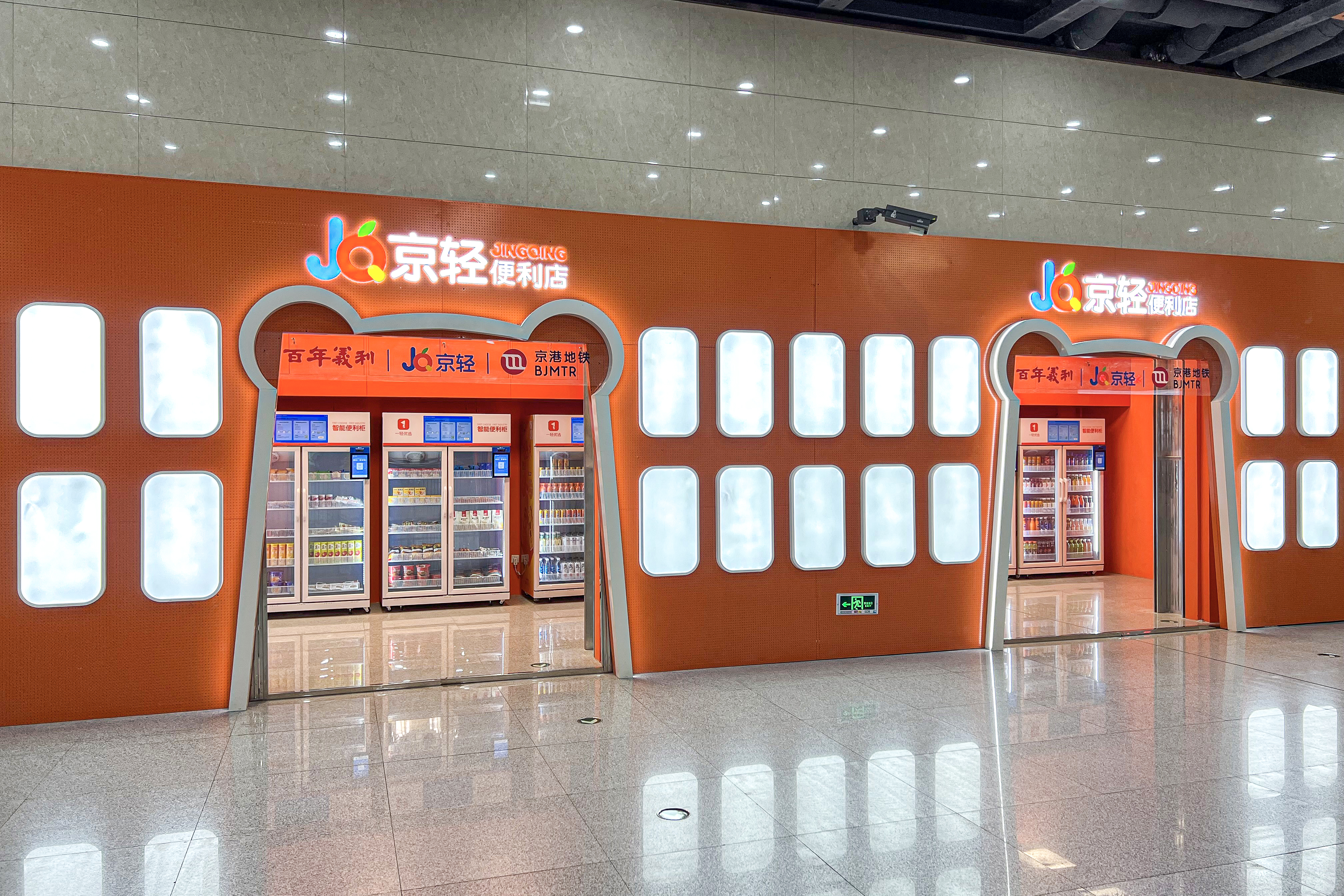
An unmanned convenience store at National Library station, Beijing Subway in 2022

An unmanned store is a retail concept in which there are no service personnel and no cashiers in the store. These stores can range from simple roadside stalls with a lockbox for payments to more sophisticated setups where transactions are handled through mobile applications and monitored by technology. Unlike an automated convenience store, the unmanned store concept may or may not rely on technology like smartphone-related systems and artificial intelligence to operate.

While the modern concept of unmanned stores has gained global attention, the idea of unmanned retail has existed in Japan for decades in the form of small, rural stalls known as Mujin Hanbai (無人販売). These traditional stalls, often found in rural areas, operate on an honor system where customers leave payment in a designated container.

== History ==
=== Early examples ===
In January 2016, a 24-hour unmanned convenience store opened in Viken, Sweden. Customers use a smartphone app to enter the store, scan items, and receive a monthly bill. The store, designed to serve people needing essentials during off-hours, is monitored by security cameras, and the owner restocks the shelves.

=== Japan ===
In Japan, unmanned retail has a long tradition, particularly in the form of small, rural stalls called Mujin Hanbai. These stalls, often owned by local farmers, operate on an honor system where customers take products and leave payment in a designated container. This form of unmanned store is prevalent in rural areas and is known for its simplicity and reliance on community trust.

=== Poland ===
In Poland, the convenience store chain Żabka has experimented with unmanned store concepts. Some locations have implemented self-checkout systems and mobile app access to streamline purchases and reduce the need for on-site staff, reflecting a growing trend toward automated retail in urban areas.

=== Other developments ===
Japan's Lawson announced in December 2017 that it would introduce unmanned stores that year. The Signature concept store in South Korea opened on May 16 on the 31st floor of Lotte World Tower, the tallest building in Seoul. On January 29, 2018, Taiwan also launched 7-11's first unmanned store X-STORE.

== Description ==
Unmanned stores can take various forms. The simplest models are small stalls or roadside stands where customers leave payment in a lockbox or container based on the honor system. In more advanced models, unmanned stores may use technology such as artificial intelligence camera systems and machine algorithms to monitor customer movements and transactions. These stores may track which items customers pick up or return, automatically adding or removing them from a virtual shopping cart. In all cases, unmanned stores eliminate the need for staff, relying instead on customer honesty or technology to manage transactions.

== See also ==
- Automated retail
- Automated convenience store
