= Żabka =

Chain of Polish convenience store shops

- Type: Sp. z o.o.
- Industry: Retail
- Founded: 1998; 28 years ago
- Founders: Mariusz Świtalski
- Headquarters: Poznań, Poland
- Number of locations: 13,000 (2026)
- Area served: Poland, Romania (as froo), Czech Republic, Slovakia
- Key people: Tomasz Suchański (President of the Management Board)
- Revenue: zł 19.806 billion (2023)
- Operating income: zł 1.383 billion (2023)
- Net income: zł 360.164 million (2023)
- Total assets: zł 15.574 billion (2023)
- Total equity: zł 908.741 million (2023)
- Number of employees: 2,947 (2023; corporate office only)
- Parent: CVC Capital Partners
- Website: www.zabka.pl

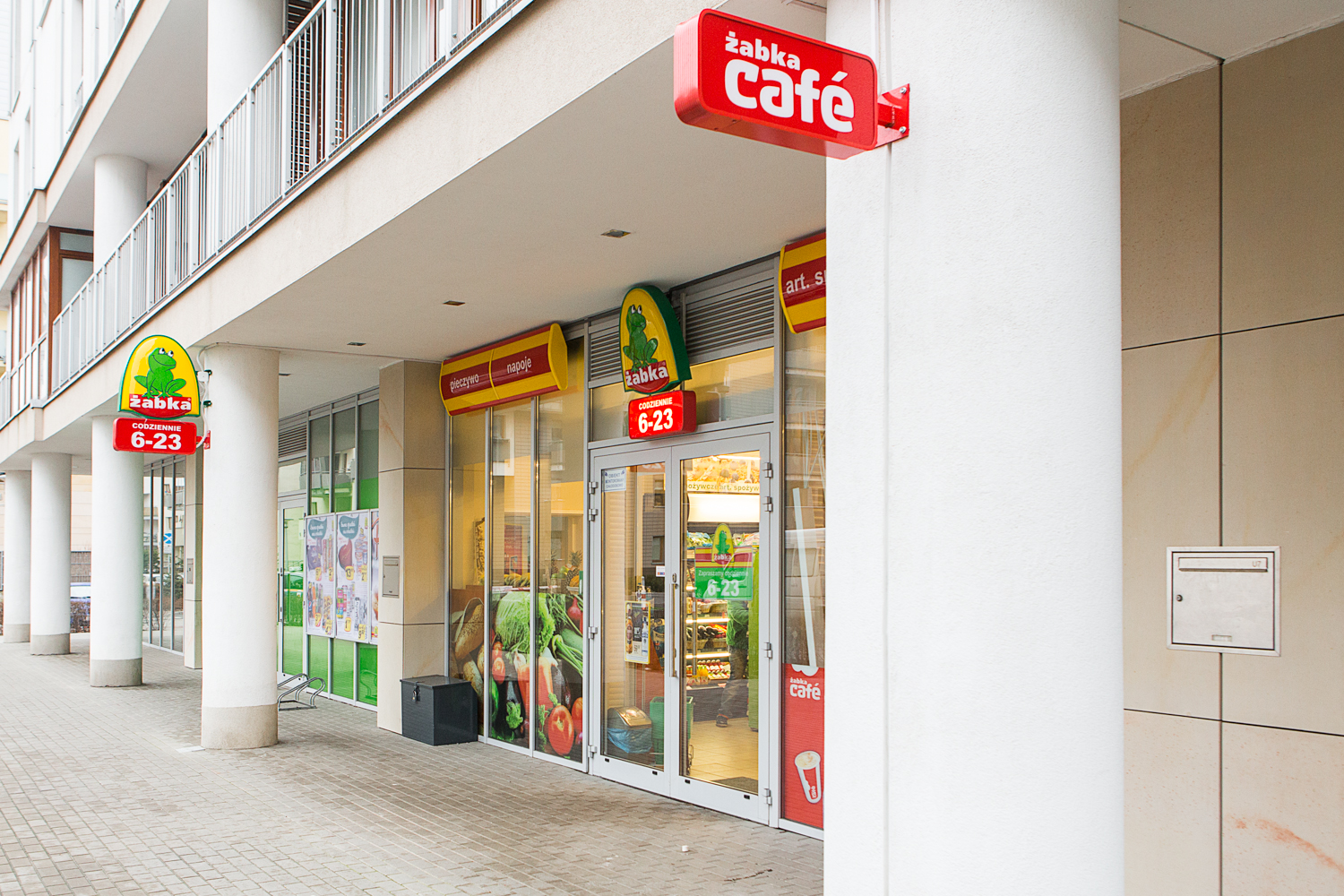
A Żabka store in Warsaw with the old logotype, February 2015.

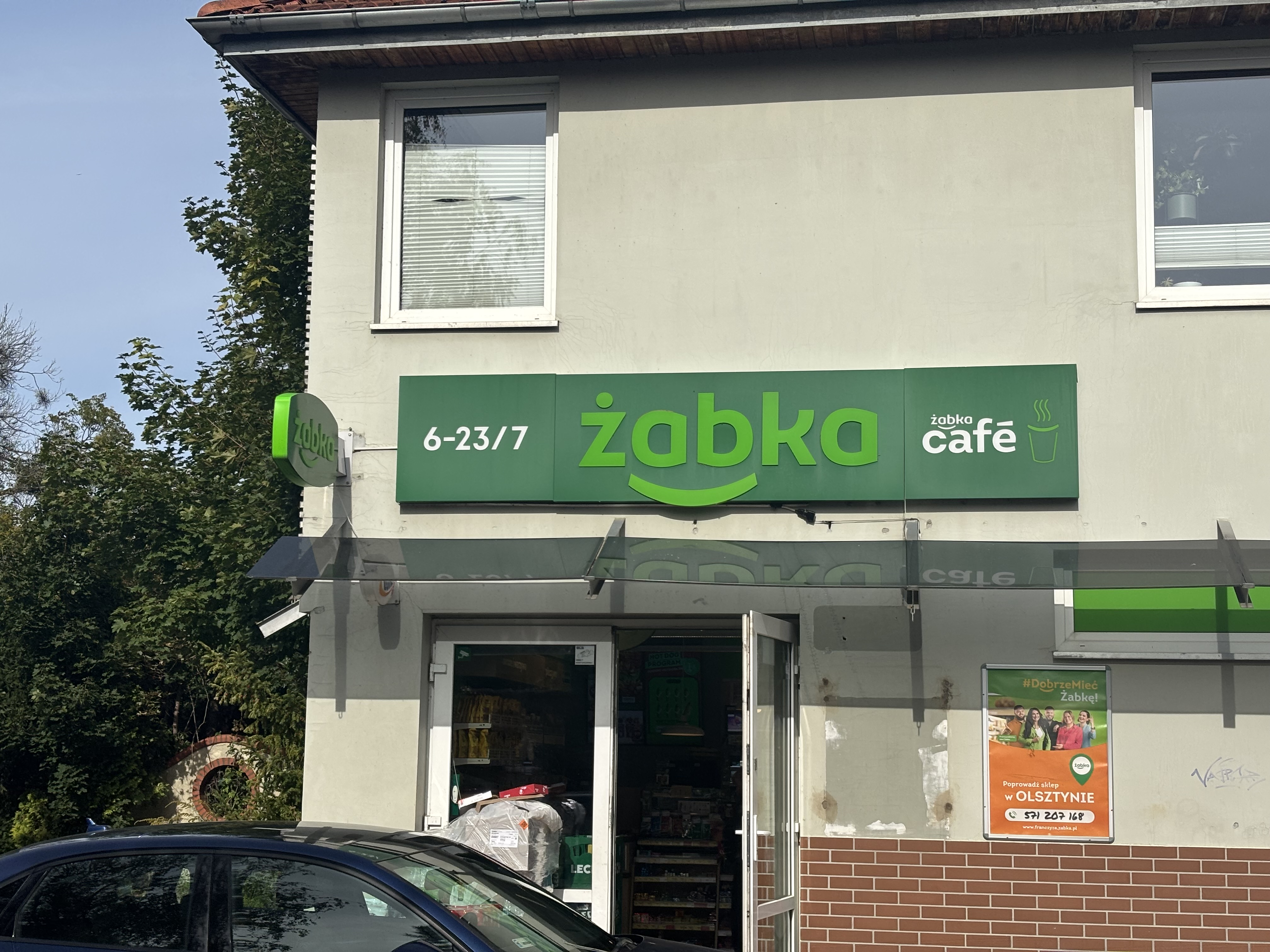
A Żabka store in Olsztyn with the current logotype, September 2025.

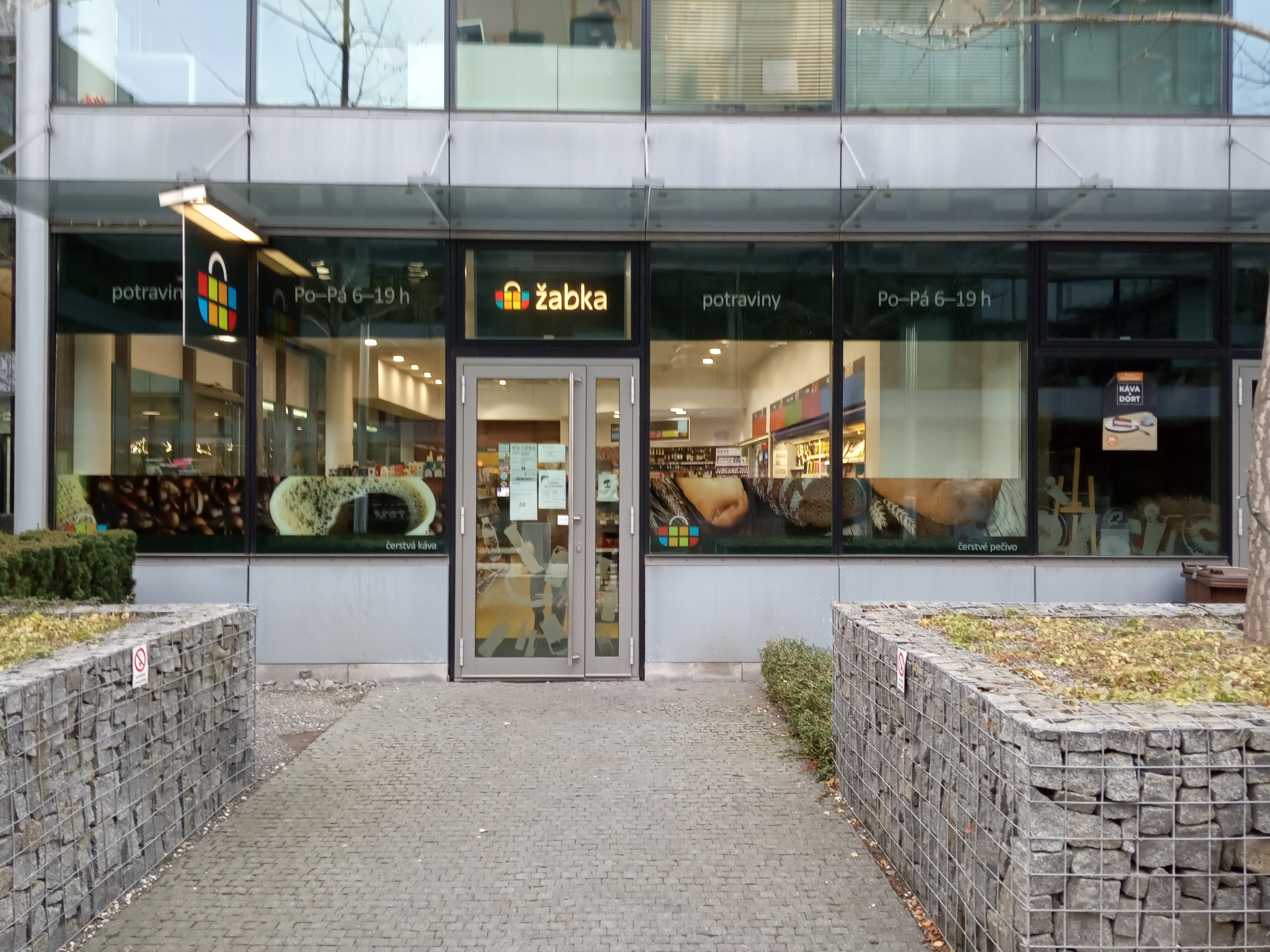
A Žabka Czechia store in Prague, Czech Republic.

Żabka Polska, better known as Żabka (Polish pronunciation: [ˈʐapka]; 'lit. 'little frog'), is a chain of convenience stores with approximately 13,000 locations across Poland. The company serves over three million customers daily and generated approximately €4.6 billion in revenue in 2023.

Żabka stores feature a Żabka Cafe area where customers can find fast food, hot snacks and coffee. The company also offers several products under its own brands, such as Szamamm ready-to-eat meals, Tomcio Paluch sandwiches, Wycisk fresh juices and lemonades, and Foodini healthy liquid snacks. Additionally, the stores provide various services, including lottery tickets, credit and debit card cash deposits and withdrawals, gift and prepaid card purchases, utility bill payments, and parcel delivery and collection.

The company has been expanding into new formats, including cashierless Żabka Nano stores and drive-through Żabka Drive stores. Since 2024, the Żabka Group has been expanding into the Romanian market under the Froo brand, aiming to operate 200 stores and generate €175 million in revenues by the end of the year.

== History ==
Żabka was founded by entrepreneur Mariusz Świtalski in 1998 and in the same year opened its first seven stores in Poznań and Swarzędz. By October 2005, Żabka had 1,700 stores throughout Poland. In 2007, Żabka was acquired by Penta Investments.

In December 2010, Penta sold the Czech operations of Żabka (localized as Žabka) and its Koruna subsidiary to UK retail giant Tesco plc. The deal was closed in April 2011. In February 2011, Penta signed an agreement to sell the remaining Polish operations Żabka Polska, including the Freshmarket store format, to Mid Europa Partners.

In 2016, Żabka underwent a rebranding. In February 2017, Mid Europa Partners closed a deal to sell Żabka for an undisclosed value (but estimated by analysts between €1 billion and €1.5 billion) to the Luxembourg-based CVC Capital Partners.

Since 2018, after the long-expected Sunday trading ban in Poland was introduced, Żabka Polska has increased its focus on self-checkouts and automated, unmanned stores, the latter using the Microsoft Azure cloud computing platform.

In 2021, Polish track and field athlete Maria Andrejczyk auctioned off the silver medal she had won at the Tokyo Olympics a few weeks earlier, to raise funds for the treatment of an eight-month-old baby; Żabka won the auction and returned the medal to the athlete.

In late-2022, Jarosław Kaczyński suggested that the Polish Law and Justice government might buy Żabka from CVC Capital Partners.

In December 2023, it was announced that Żabka would open its first stores in Romania.

In March 2024, it had been announced that Żabka will offer mobile phone repair services.

As of November 2024, Żabka is listed on the Warsaw Stock Exchange under ticker ZAB.

In July of 2026, Bloomberg reported that the Japanese-owned Seven & I Holdings was in the process of negotiating a possible acquisition of the store chain, but the acquisition was later abandoned.

== Formats ==
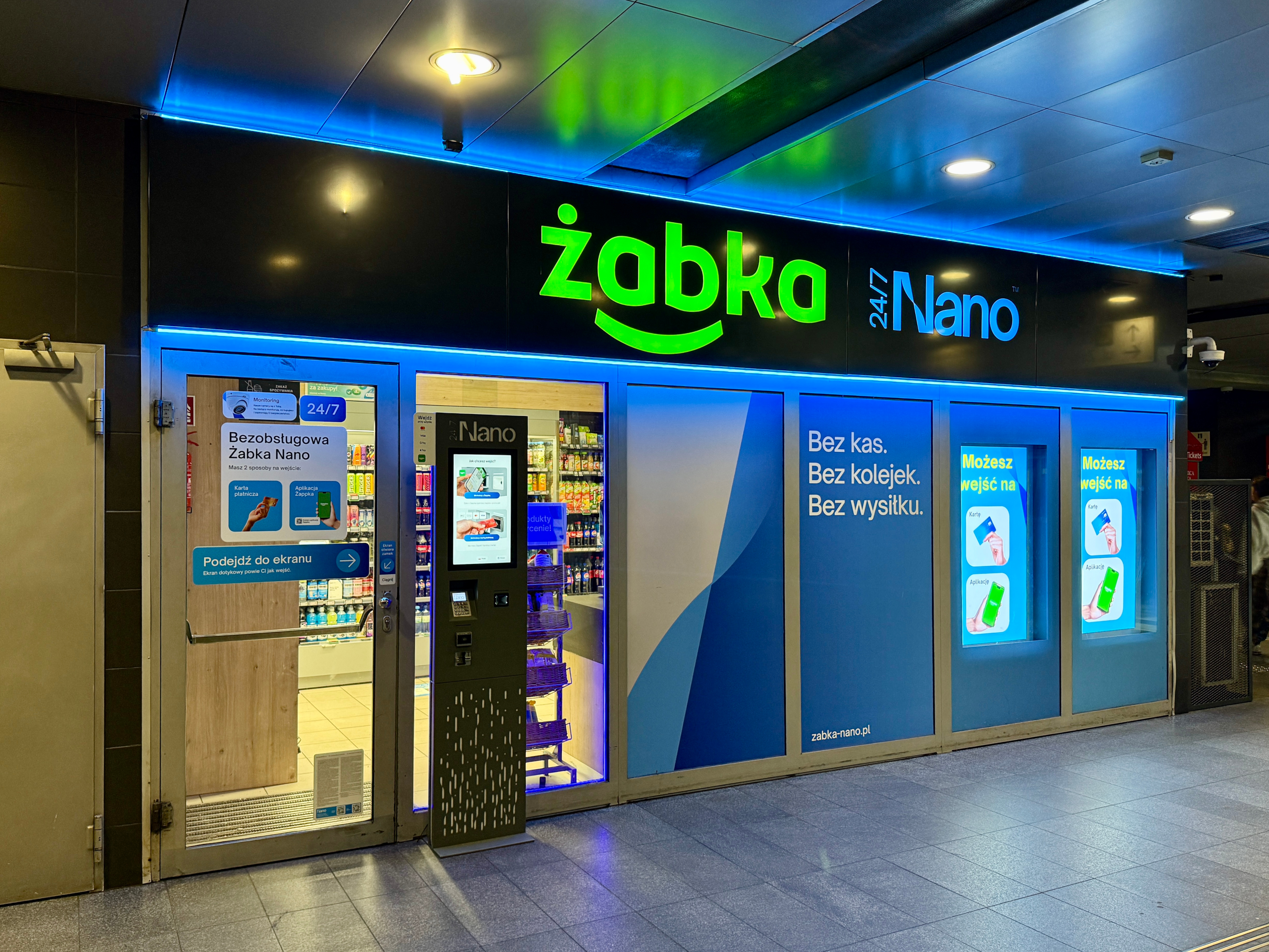
Żabka Nano in Warsaw.

In addition to its regular manned stores, Żabka also has smaller, unmanned stores called Żabka Nano (formerly Żappka, also the name of Żabka's mobile app, introduced in 2020). Żabka Nano stores are open 24 hours a day and operate without staff or checkout areas. Customers tap their payment card at the entrance or use the Żappka app to open the door to the store, take products from the shelves, and leave. Video cameras and AI are used to identify the goods taken and charge the customer.

The first Żabka Nano store was opened at the grounds of the Poznań International Fair in June 2021. Notable Żabka Nano stores include one located inside Poland's largest Decathlon store in Piaseczno, opened in December 2021, and a pilot store located at the Tesla Gigafactory Berlin-Brandenburg in Germany, which operated during the third quarter of 2022.

== Gallery ==
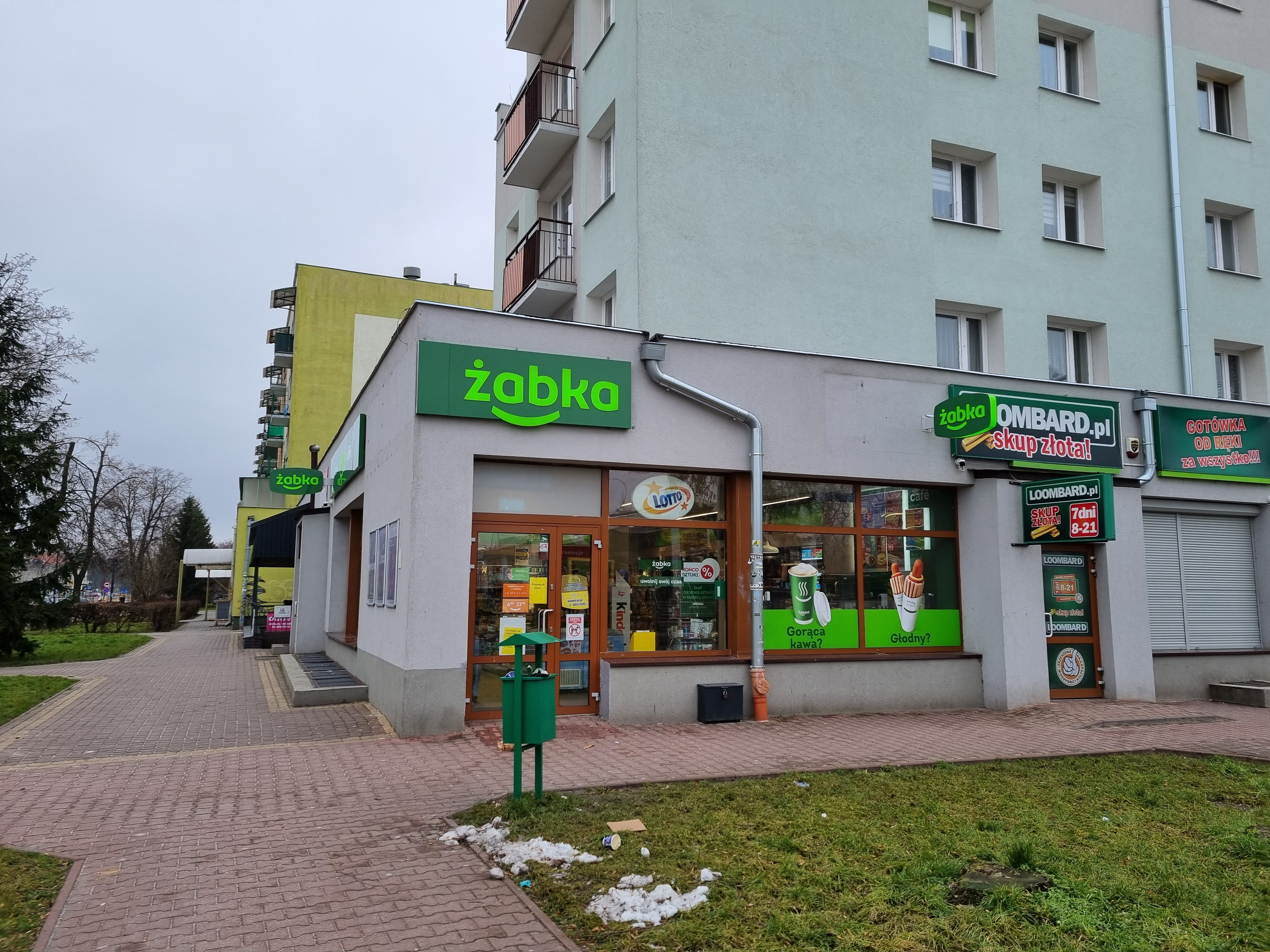
A Żabka store in Chełm

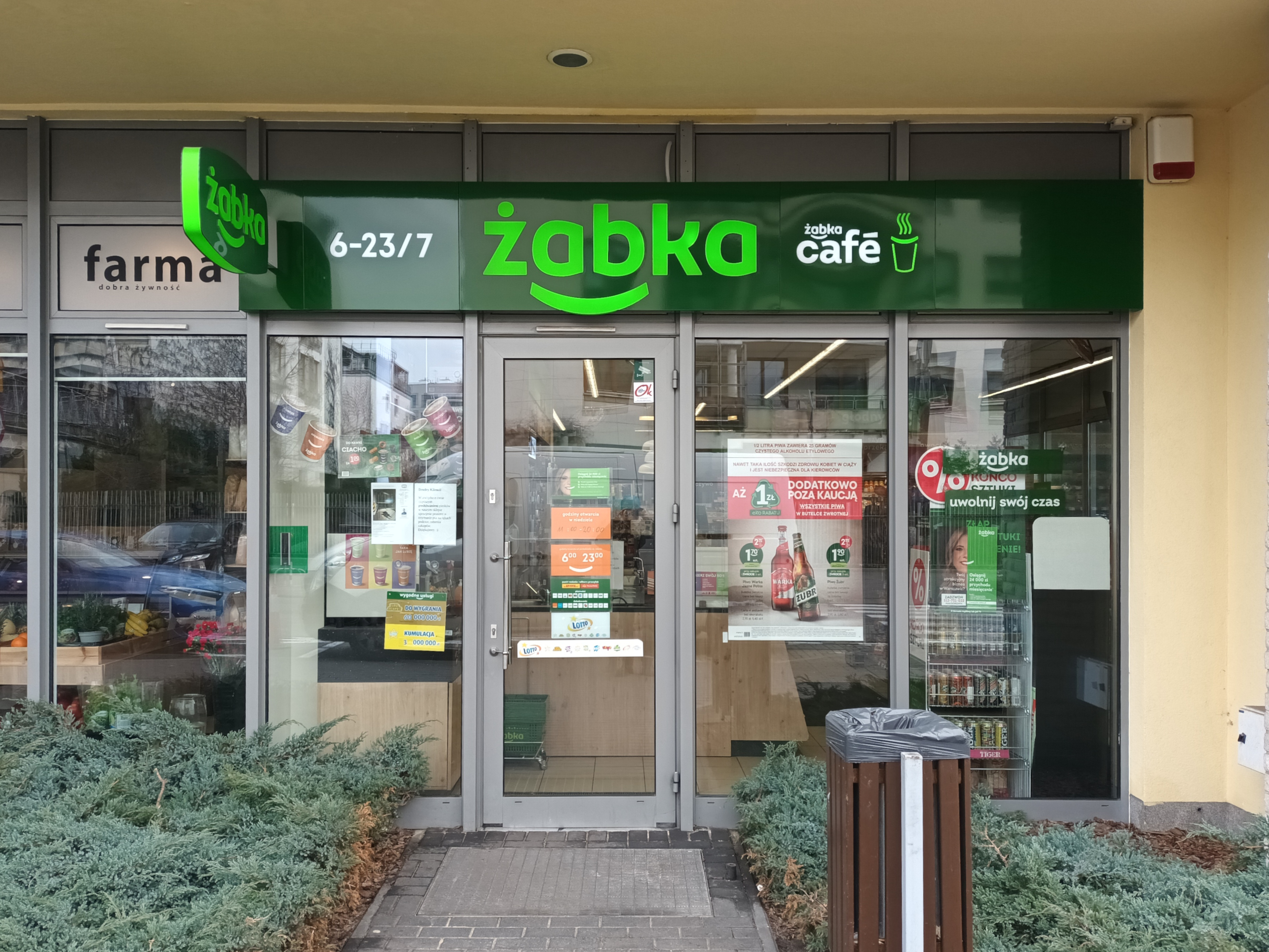
A Żabka store in Warsaw

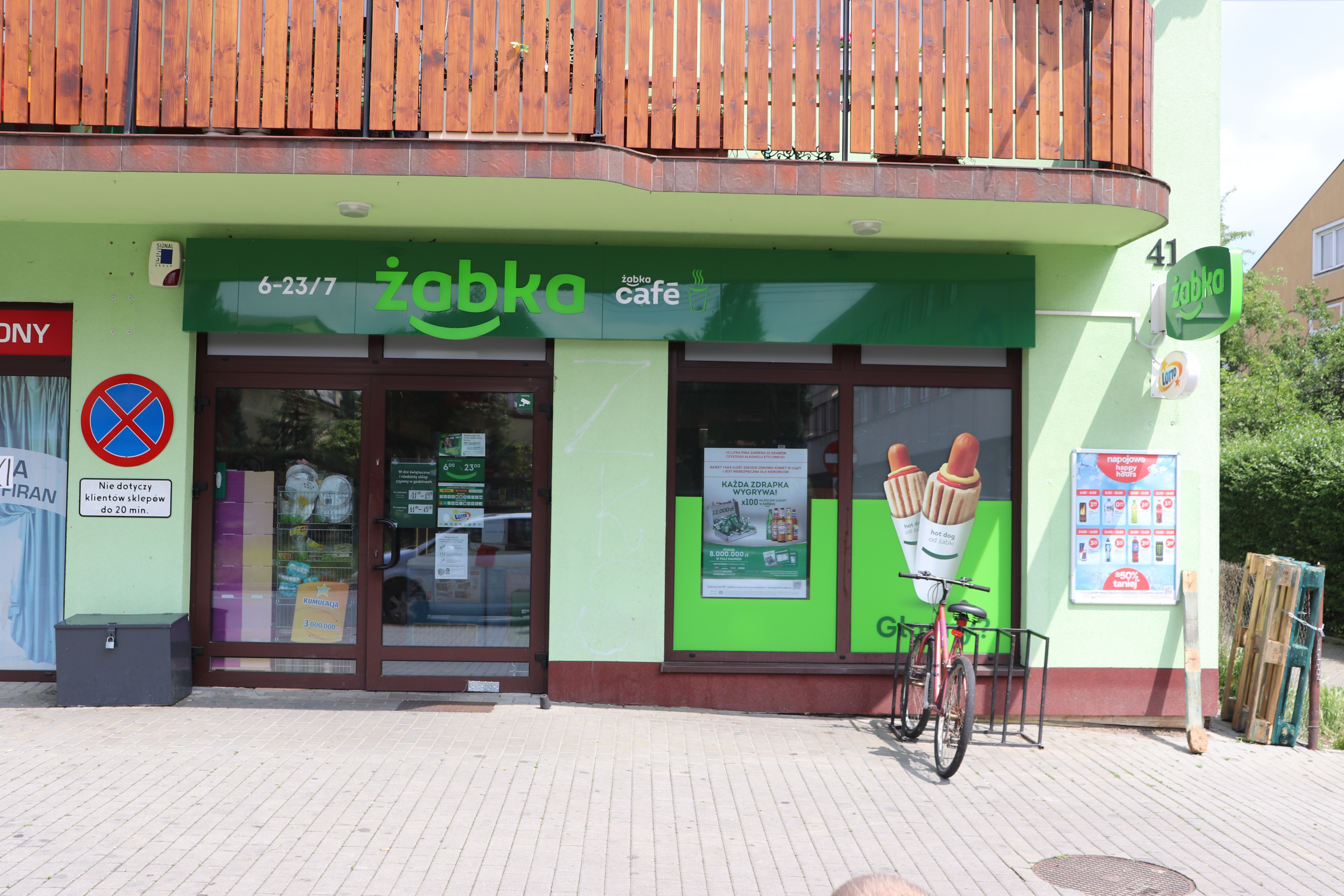
A Żabka store in Tarnów

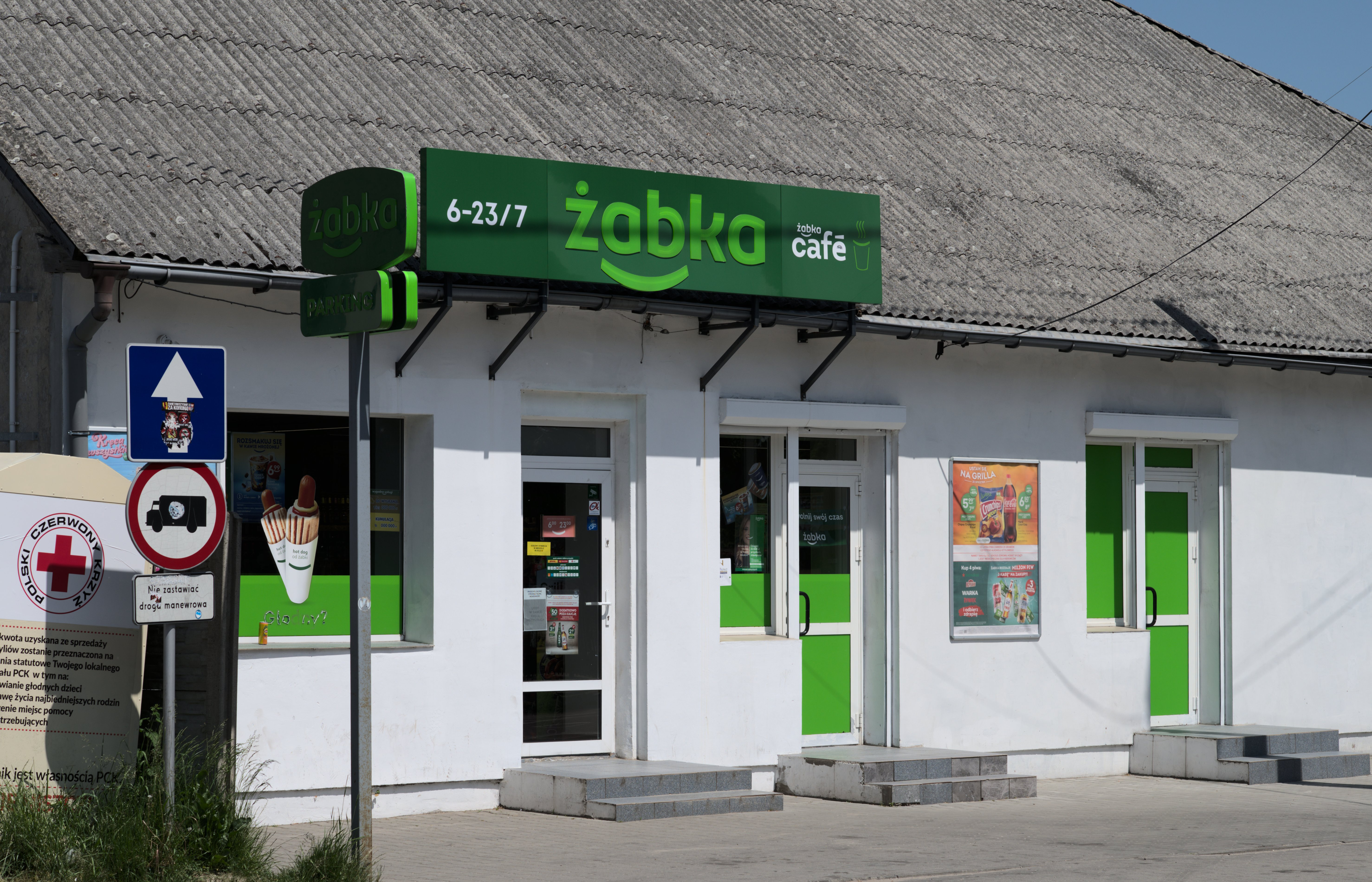
A Żabka store in Bliżyn

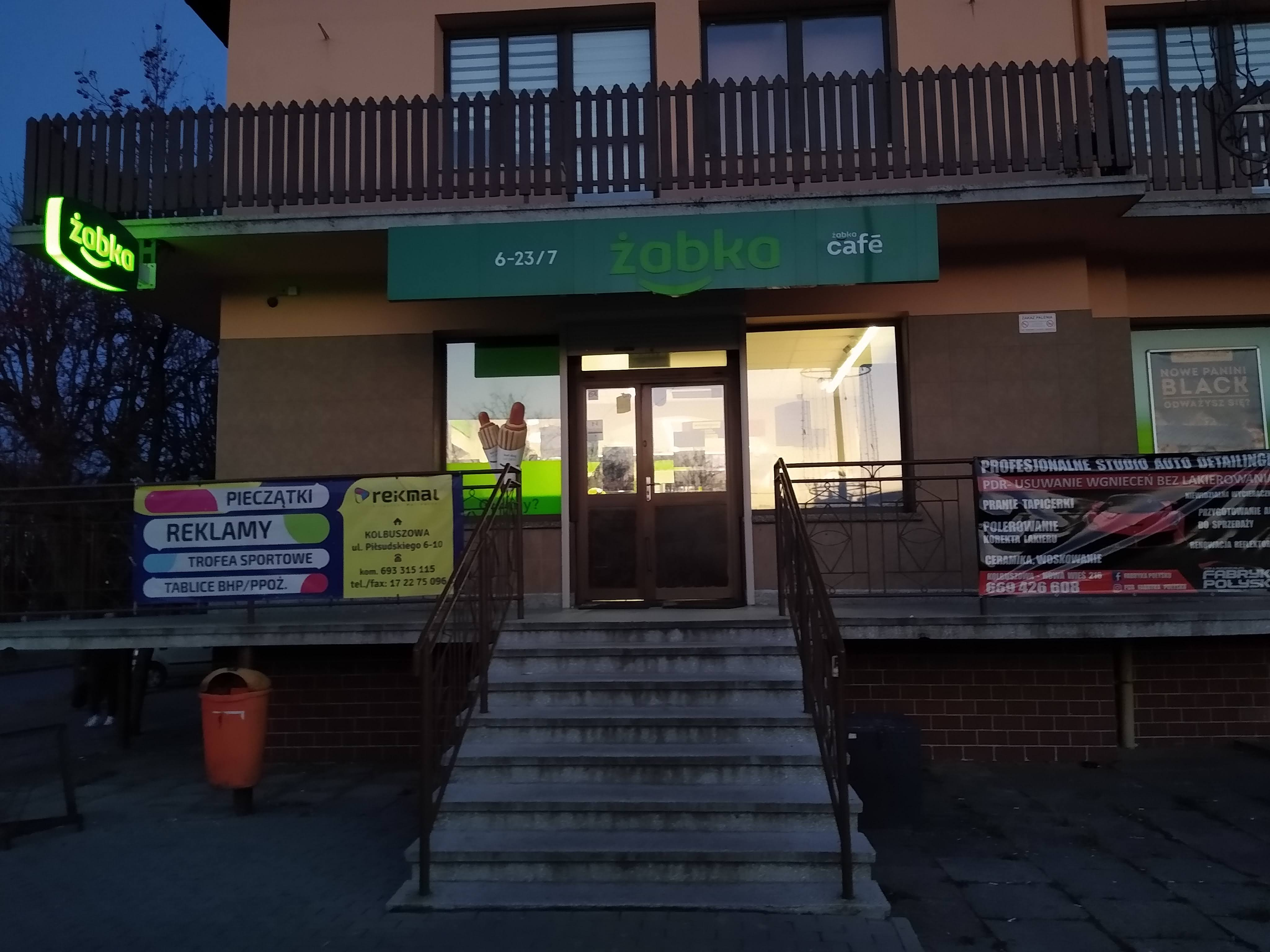
A Żabka store in Kolbuszowa

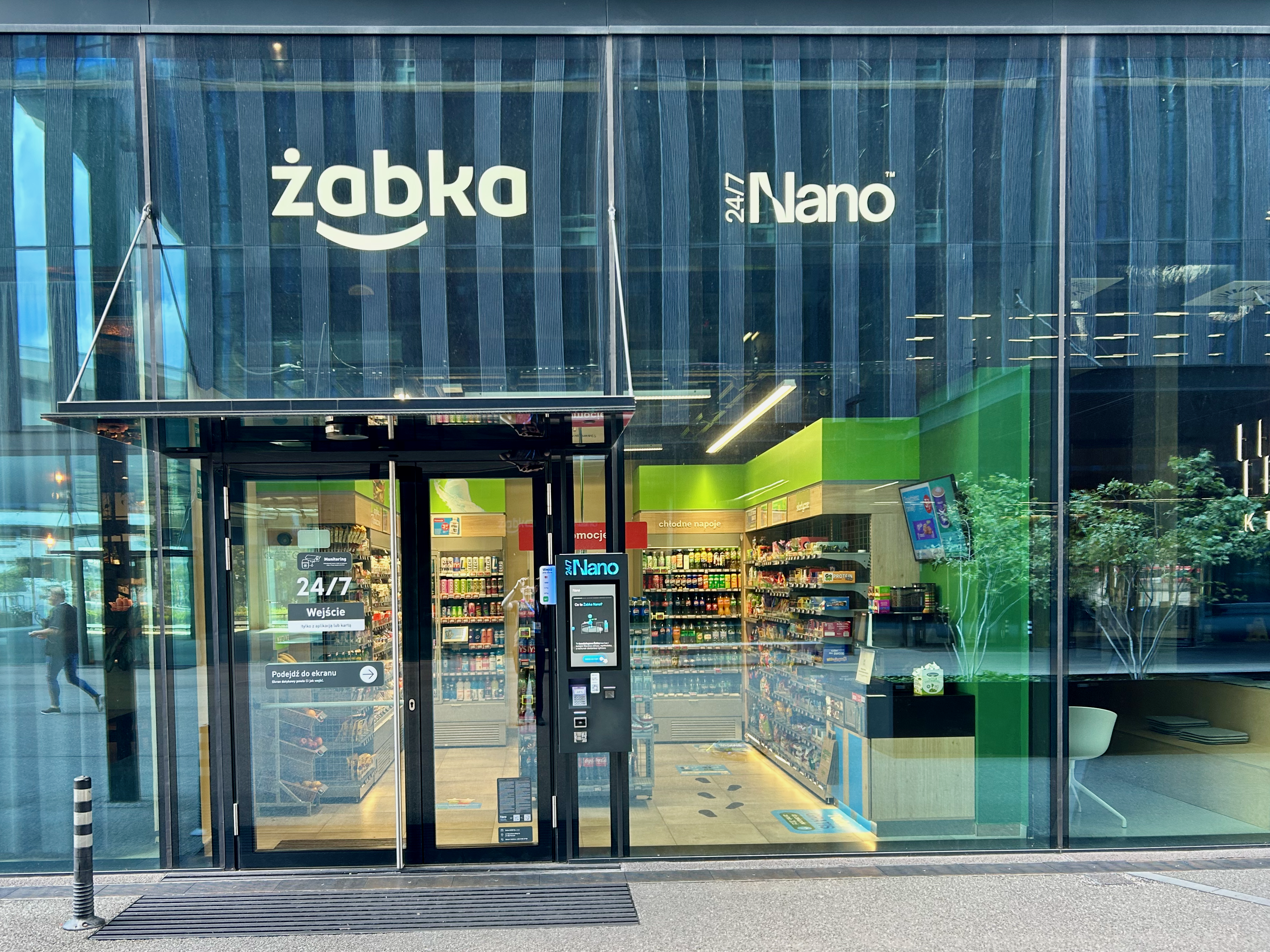
A Żabka Nano store in Katowice

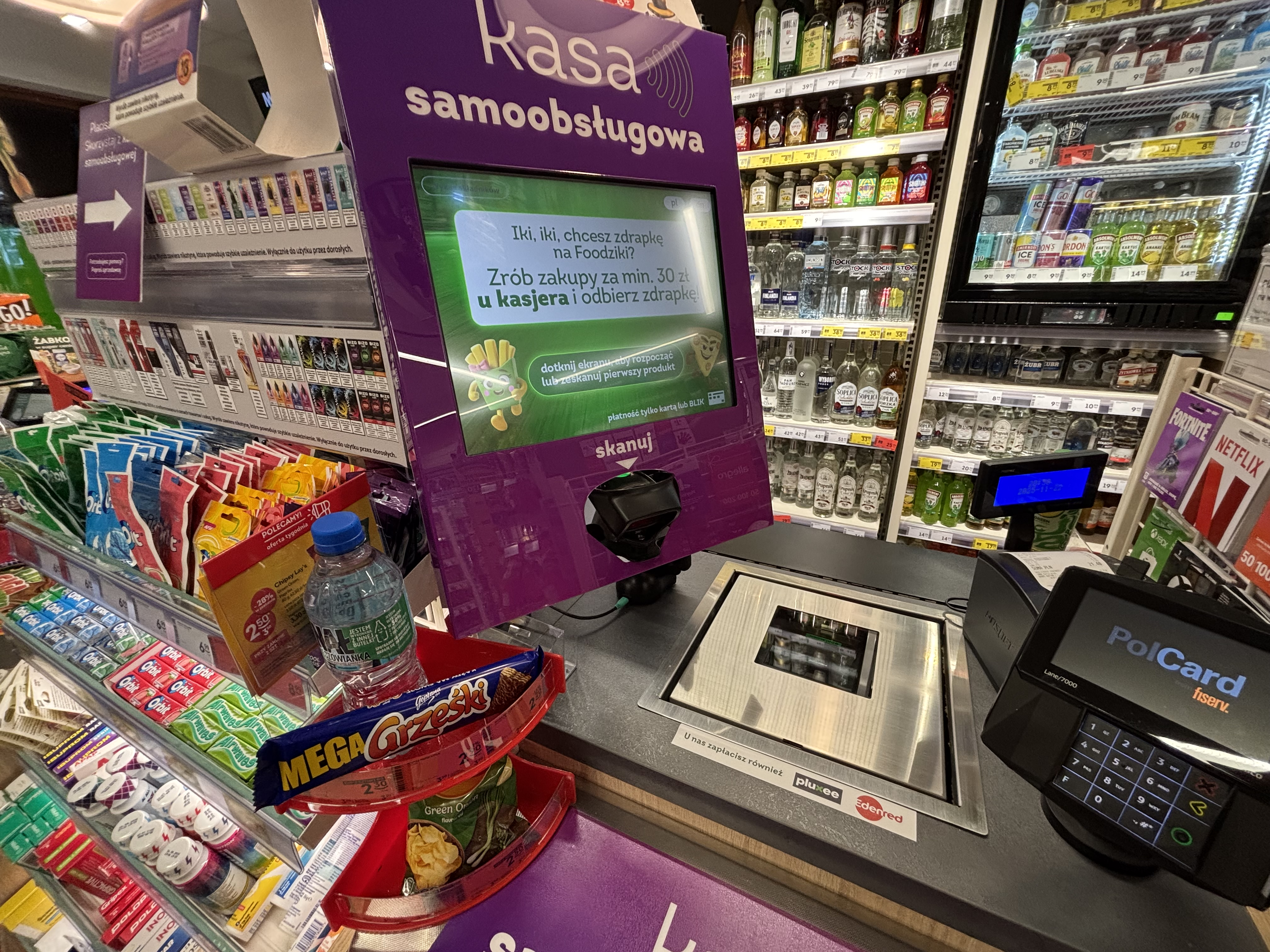
A self-service machine in a Żabka store in Radom

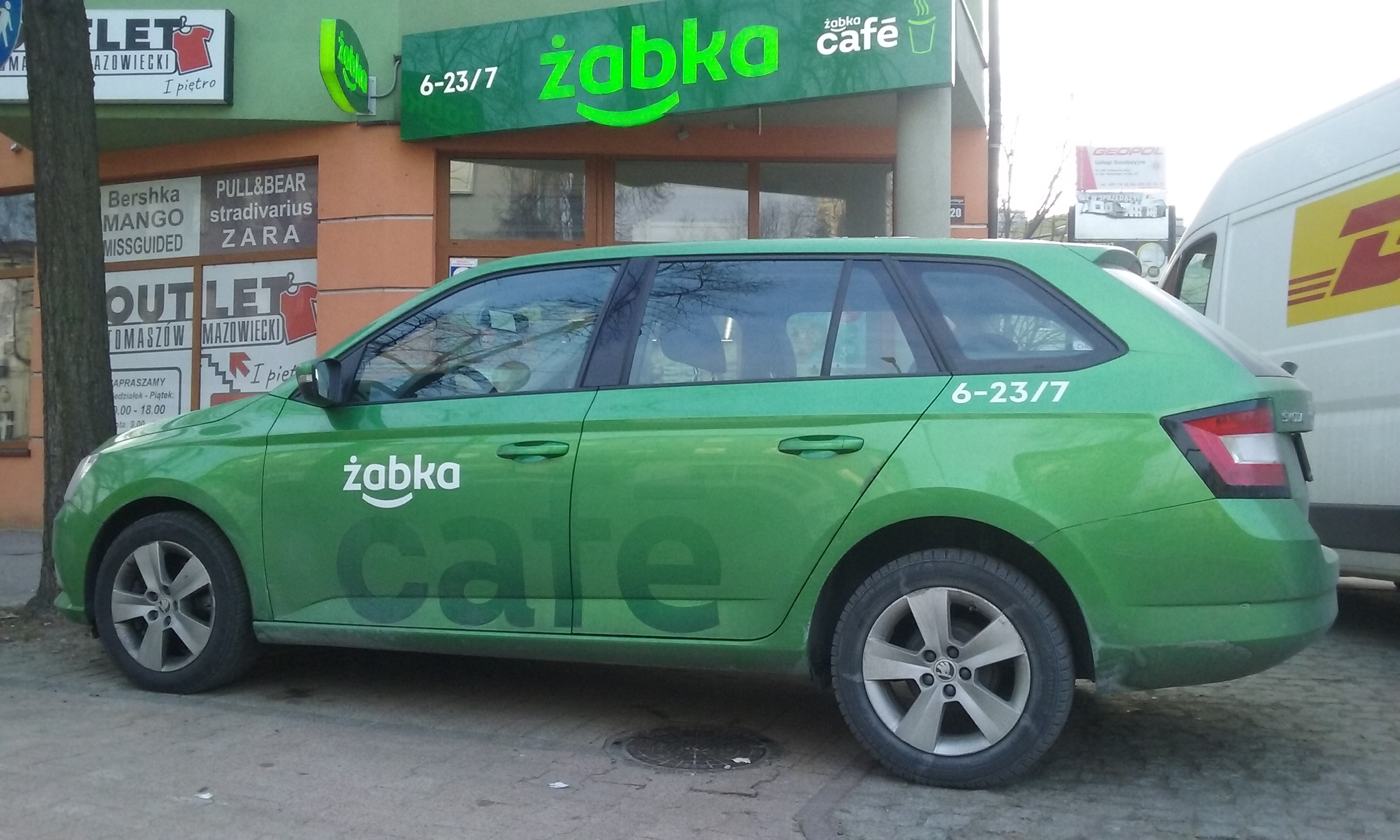
A Żabka service car in Tomaszów Mazowiecki
