= Phu My Hung Corporation =

Urban infrastructure developer company

Phu My Hung Development Corporation

- Phú Mỹ Hưng first headquarters (relocated in 2026)
- Native name: Công ty TNHH Phát triển Phú Mỹ Hưng
- Type: Private
- Founded: May 19, 1993
- Founder: Lawrence Ting
- Headquarters: Tân Mỹ, Ho Chi Minh City, Vietnam
- Website: Official website

The Phu My Hung Development Corporation (PMH; Vietnamese: Công ty TNHH Phát triển Phú Mỹ Hưng) is a joint venture between Phú Mỹ Hưng Asian Holdings, a subsidiary of the CT and D Group of Taiwan and IPC, an entity under the Ho Chi Minh City People Committee

PMH is an urban infrastructure developer in Vietnam. It was founded in 1993 by Lawrence S. Ting. One of PMH's plans won an American Institute of Architects Honor Award for Urban Design in 1997. PMH also operates two schools: Saigon South International School and the Lawrence S. Ting Memorial School.

PMH is the investor and developer for numerous real estate projects, including: Nam Thiên Villas, Nam Thông II Villas, Nam Viên Residential Area, Mỹ Kim 1 Villas, Phú Gia Phú Mỹ Hưng, Phú Mỹ Hưng Urban Area, Garden Plaza, Riverside Residence, Green Valley, The Symphony, The Antonia, and more.

== Awards ==
- Labor Medal of First Class from President Nguyễn Minh Triết (December 2007)
- First "Model City" award from Minister of Construction (June 2008)
