= Mini Melts =

Ice cream brand

- Company type: Private
- Industry: Food & Beverage (Frozen Novelties)
- Founded: 1995
- Founders: Nick Angus, Tom Mosey
- Headquarters: Florida, U.S.
- Area served: Worldwide
- Key people: Tom Mosey (President & CEO, Mini Melts Inc.)
- Products: Cryogenically flash-frozen bead ice cream (14% butterfat)
- Number of employees: ~200–500
- Website: https://www.minimelts.com/

Mini Melts is an ice cream brand known for its beaded ice cream, produced using cryogenic technology. Established in 1996, the brand operates in over 30 countries and offers a variety of flavors.

== History and background ==
The brand originated in the 1990s when founders Tom Mosey and Nick Angus experimented with cryogenic freezing to create beaded ice cream. Early production facilities were set up in the U.S., and by 1998, partnerships in South Korea helped expand its presence in Asia.

In 2004, Mini Melts expanded further in the U.S., and in 2010, its Connecticut manufacturing facility was licensed to new operators. The European market grew after a 2015 partnership with Latvian producer Rūjienas Saldējums.

In 2023, Mini Melts USA received investment from Altamont Capital Partners, leading to distribution network expansion and a brand refresh in 2024. Despite updates, the company retained its original cup design introduced in 2004.

In 2012, Mini Melts introduced Mini Melts Big, a larger, freezer-stable version made with fruit bases for lactose-free options. In 2020, Mini Melts Big for Pets was launched in South Korea as a frozen treat for animals.

Product Details

Mini Melts ice cream contains 14% butterfat, contributing to its dense texture. It is flash-frozen without added air, differentiating it from traditional ice cream. Popular flavors include Cotton Candy, Cookies & Cream, and Rainbow Ice, with 14 options available. The brand also offers non-dairy alternatives.

Distribution methods include cryogenic freezers in vending kiosks, retail freezers, and custom carts. A variant called Slow Melts, designed for conventional freezers, is available in Europe and Asia.

== Manufacturing and technology ==
The production process relies on patented cryogenic freezing technology developed by the founders. Facilities worldwide manufacture the product, with regional hubs handling different markets. South Korea serves as an innovation center, while Latvia produces ice cream for Europe using natural ingredients.

== Global operations ==
Mini Melts operates in over 30 countries, including the U.S., South Korea, the U.K., Poland, and Egypt. Regional production facilities include:

- South Korea – Focus on milk and sorbet products.
- Latvia – Supplies Europe with ice cream made from fresh milk and cream.
- Egypt – Serves the Middle East market.
- Canada & U.S. – Production plants in Calgary and Norwich, Connecticut.

In the U.S., 23 distribution centers supply over 35,000 locations, including convenience stores, amusement parks, and major retailers like Walmart and 7-Eleven.
