= Saigon Centre =

Complex of multi-buildings in Vietnam

Coordinates: 10°46′23″N 106°42′03″E

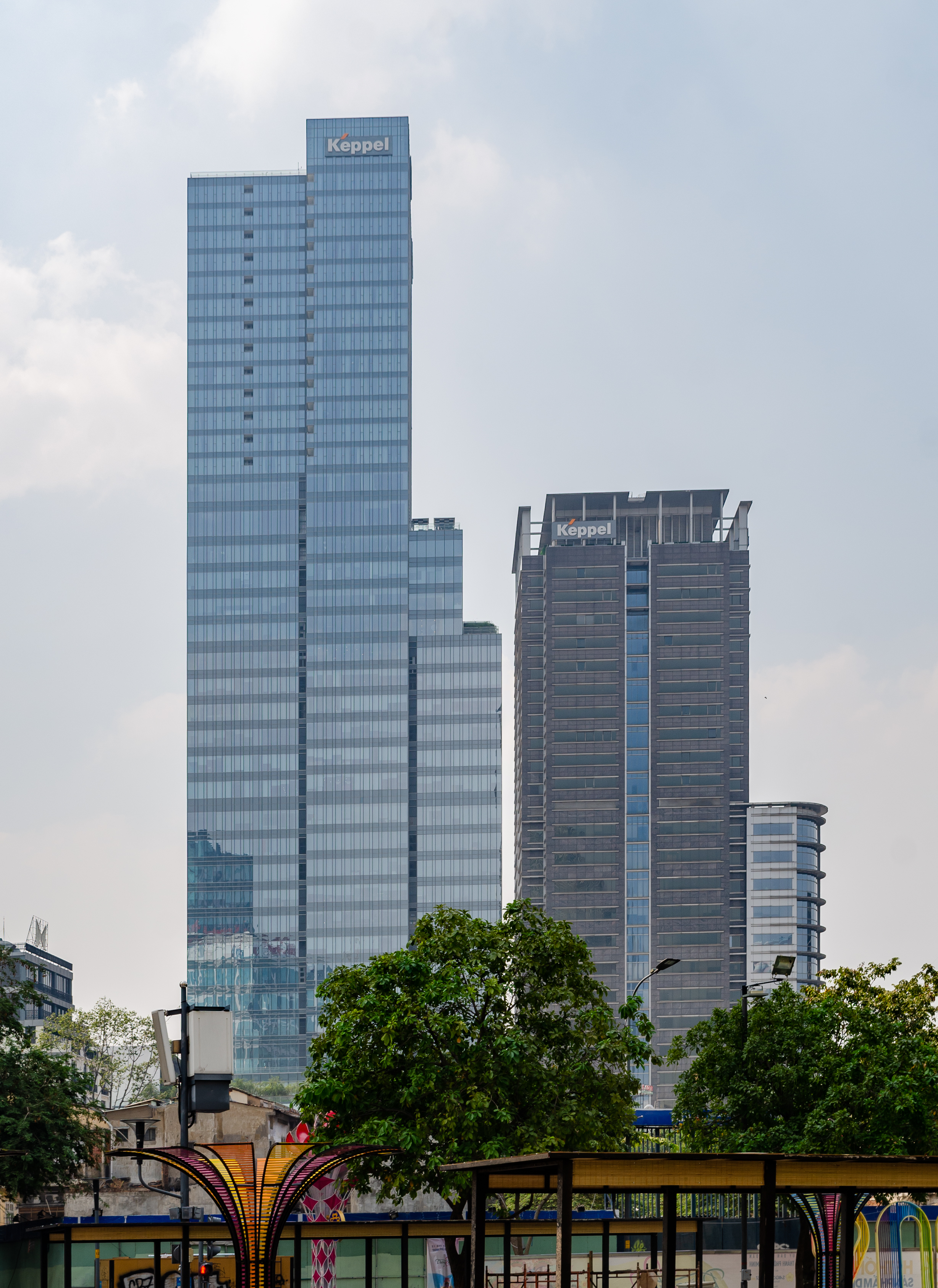
- Saigon Centre Tower 2 (left) and Tower 1 (right)
- Hotel chain: Fusion Original Saigon Centre (Tower 1); Sedona Suites Ho Chi Minh City (Tower 2)

Record height
- Preceded by: Sunwah Tower
- Surpassed by: Saigon Trade Center

General information
- Status: Phase 1: Complete; Phase 2: Complete; Phase 3: On hold
- Type: Office, shopping mall, hotel and serviced apartment
- Architectural style: Tower 1: Postmodern; Tower 2: International Style
- Location: Tower 1: 65 Lê Lợi Boulevard & 57 Pasteur Street; Tower 2: 67 Lê Lợi Boulevard & 92-94 Nam Kỳ Khởi Nghĩa Street, Saigon, Ho Chi Minh City, Vietnam
- Completed: Phase 1: 1996; Phase 2: 2017
- Owner: Toshin Development, Keppel Land, Resco, Sowatco
- Landlord: Keppel Land Watco JV

Height
- Roof: Tower 1: 106 m (348 ft); Tower 2: 193.7 m (635 ft)
- Top floor: Tower 1: 24; Tower 2: 42

Technical details
- Floor count: Tower 1: 24 + 3 underground Tower 2: 42 + 6 underground
- Lifts/elevators: Tower 1: 7 Tower 2: 11

Design and construction
- Architects: Phase 1: Denton Corker Marshall; Phase 2: NBBJ
- Developer: Keppel Land Ltd
- Structural engineer: Phase 1: Bachy Soletanche; Phase 2: AECOM
- Main contractor: Phase 1: John Laing Group; Phase 2: Hoa Binh Corporation

Other information
- Public transit: L1 L2 L4 L12 Ben Thanh station, Opera House station (Line 1 only)

Website
- Saigon Centre

Saigon Centre is a mixed-use complex in Ho Chi Minh City, Vietnam, invested by Keppel Land Watco, a joint-venture among Keppel Land from Singapore with both Vietnamese companies Real Estate Saigon Corporation (RESCO) and Southern Waterborne Transport Corporation (SOWATCO). The complex is located on Lê Lợi Boulevard in District 1, Ho Chi Minh City.

== History ==
Saigon Centre Tower 1 in 2011

Phase 1 of the complex, Saigon Centre I, was completed in 1996. The phase consisted of a 25-storey building, which set a new record for the highest building in Vietnam then at 106 metres (348 ft).

In December 2011, construction on phase two known as Saigon Centre II & III started, which comprises a 5-story retail podium and a new 43-story building. The new addition prompted a temporary closure of the existing tower's podium from 2015 to 2016.

Construction of Saigon Centre Phase 2 in December 2014

On July 30, 2016, Takashimaya opened their first department store in Vietnam at the retail podium of Saigon Centre. Tower 2 completed in 2017 reaching the height of 193.7 m (635 ft). It became the fourth tallest building in Ho Chi Minh City and the tenth tallest building in Vietnam overall then.

The complex last section is phase 3, known as Saigon Centre IV & V, which comprises an expected over-200-meter tower and continue to expand the retail podium on the side of Huỳnh Thúc Kháng Street. After its completion, the complex will entirely within a city block, covered by four streets; however, the phase still has not started construction and is temporarily used as an expansion parking lot of the complex. In October 2025, Keppel received the Investment Registration Certificate (IRC) for Saigon Centre Phase 3 from Ho Chi Minh City government, the construction will be started in late 2026 and will be opened in about 5 years. Toshin Development (a subsidiary of the Japanese group Takashimaya) has spent approximately US$46.4 million (equivalent to nearly VND 2 trillion) to acquire a 22.6% stake in Phase 3 of the Saigon Centre project from Singapore's Keppel Group.

== Features ==
=== Floor use ===
Tower	1	2
Level	Use	
30–42	–	Sedona Suites Ho Chi Minh City – Grand Tower
28–29	–	SKY28 Sedona Lobby Lounge, The Straits Restaurants by Sedona, LAI – Cantonese Restaurant, Towa – Japanese Cuisine & Lounge
26–27	–	Mechanical levels, (Saigon Riviera Company Ltd. at a corner of Level 26)
25	–	Office space tenant area
24	Miss Thu – fine-dining restaurant	Office space tenant area
15–23	Fusion Original Saigon Centre Hotel	Office space tenant area
8–14	Office space tenant area	Office space tenant area
6–7	Office space tenant area	Sky Garden floor for outdoor swimming pool, coffee shops, restaurants with California Centuryon Saigon Centre Gym Room, Sedona Suites Meeting & Game Room,
5	Office space tenant area	Restaurants, food court
4	Saigon Centre Shopping Mall	Saigon Centre Shopping Mall
1–3	Saigon Centre Shopping Mall	Takashimaya Department Store
B1	Parking lot	Takashimaya Department Store
B2	Parking lot	Takashimaya Department Store
B3–B6	–	Parking lot
"–" denotes the tower doesn't have those levels

==== Notes: ====
- Fusion Original Saigon Centre Hotel Lobby at Level 1 of Tower 1
- Lobbies of Office space tenant area and Sedona Suites Ho Chi Minh City Hotel – Grand Tower at G Level of Tower 2
- 18 floors of office tenant area is divided into Low Zone for the lower half and High Zone for the upper half

=== Office leasing ===
Saigon Centre provides over 46,000 m^{2} (500,000 sq ft) of office space across 10 floors (from 5 to 14) in Tower 1 and 18 floors in Tower 2 (from 8 to 25). Some of notable tenants here are AIG, Deutsche Bank, Mitsubishi Corporation (Representative Office in HCMC), Yuanta Securities in Tower 1 and AIA Group, Lazada, Sanyo, Shopee, Taipei Fubon Bank, Toyota in Tower 2. Consulate General of Singapore in HCMC and Tourism Authority of Thailand Representative Office in Vietnam is also located at Level 11 and 18 of Tower 2 (respectively). Keppel Land Vietnam, the complex developer, and its subsidiary for the project Saigon Sports City in Rach Chiec National Sports Complex offices are also located here.

=== Hospitality ===
Originally, Sedona Hotels & Suites Ho Chi Minh City by Keppel Land Hospitality Management operated all 284 residential units at the complex. But since mid-2022, the Sedona Hotel in Tower 1 has changed into Fusion Original Saigon Centre by Fusion Hotel Group first established by Serenity Holdings with 99 rooms, only left the Sedona Suites Ho Chi Minh City in Tower 2 with 195 residential units.

== Saigon Centre Shopping Mall ==
The podium of the complex is a 55,000 m^{2} (590,000 sq ft) Saigon Centre Shopping Mall, first opened in 1996 and spans over 3 floors of the Tower 1, until 2016 when the Tower 2 were built, it spans almost the fourth stories of Tower 1 and the bottom six stories with the first 2 basements of the Tower 2.

Level	Use	Notable brands
6	Sky Garden	California Centuryon, Cafe Terrace
5	Restaurants	Dim Tu Tac, Gogi House, Som Tum Thai, Asian Corner
4	Youth fashion, Children's products, toys, books,home goods, and family services, Sky Garden	Uniqlo, Minigood, Pop Mart, Phúc Long Coffee & Tea, Samsonite
3	Streetwear, sportswear, electronics, F&B, and event/exhibition area	Dr. Martens, MLB, Giordano, Fila, Levi's, GAP, Crocs, Fujifilm, Miyama – Modern Tokyo Restaurant Cafe, Basta Hiro
2	Men's and women's fashion, international collections, home goods, lingerie, eyewear, and hair/nail salons	Lacoste, Geox, ECCO, Onitsuka Tiger, Dsquared², Moschino, Calvin Klein, Aldo
1	High-end cosmetics, perfumes, jewelry, and international fashion accessories, Atrium Event Hall	RuNam Boutique, Montblanc, The Hour Glass, Tudor Watches, Coach, Zenith, Grand Seiko, Hublot, Cartier, BOSS, Chanel, TAG Heuer, Jo Malone London, Rimowa, Louis Vuitton, Diptyque
B1	Fashion and lifestyle brands	ABC-Mart, Converse, G2000, Nespresso, Beauty Box
B2	Supermarket, Food hall, Currency exchange & SIM card	Annam Gourmet Market, Annam Café, BreadTalk, Gong Cha McDonald's, Highlands Coffee, Trung Nguyên Legend Café, Beard Papa's, Chateraise

=== Ho Chi Minh City Takashimaya Department Store ===
The joint-venture Ho Chi Minh City Takashimaya Department Store opened in 2016 spans over first 3 levels and 2 upper basements of Tower 2 with the area of 15,000 m^{2} (160,000 sq ft) at the corner of 67 Lê Lợi with Nam Kỳ Khởi Nghĩa Street, featuring:

Level	Use	Notable counters
3	Men’s business, young fashion, household & specialty, travel & outdoor, fashion watch & bazaar, sportwear, baby & children, event hall	Yamaha Music, Bandai, Lego, Peppa Pig, Pokémon, Phiten, Play-Doh, Lacoste, Miki House, Majorette, Gundam, Hot Wheels, Casio Watch, Citizen Watch, Coach, Dickies, Wilson Sporting Goods
2	International collection, lingerie salon, branded eyewear, sundries, hair & nail salon & TWG tea salon	Maison Kitsuné, Runway, Marc Jacobs, Vera, Triumph, Versace Jeans Couture, Nike Swim, Kate Spade New York, Moschino, Diesel, Marithé et François Girbaud, Hugo Boss
1	International brands of cosmetics, fragrances, ladies’ jewelry & accessories	Polo Ralph Lauren, La Mer, Estée Lauder, Hermès, Gucci, Christian Dior, Shu Uemura, Van Cleef & Arpels, Swarovski, MAC Cosmetics, Prada, BVLGARI, Dyson, Armani Beauty, Lancôme, Sulwhasoo, Burberry, Shiseido, D&G Beauty, Elixir, NARS, Dsquared2
B1	Ladies’ wear, handbags & shoes, cosmetics, jewelries & accessories	Kya Jewel, JacQ, Skechers, Chaufifth, Aldo, Yves Rocher, Rechic
B2	Takashimaya Food Maison, Bakery, Sweet & Gifts an event space	Katinat Takashimaya Café, Royce', Alluvia, TWG Tea Retail Boutique, Cơm Tấm Mộc, Minamoto Kitchoan, Marou Station

== Gallery ==
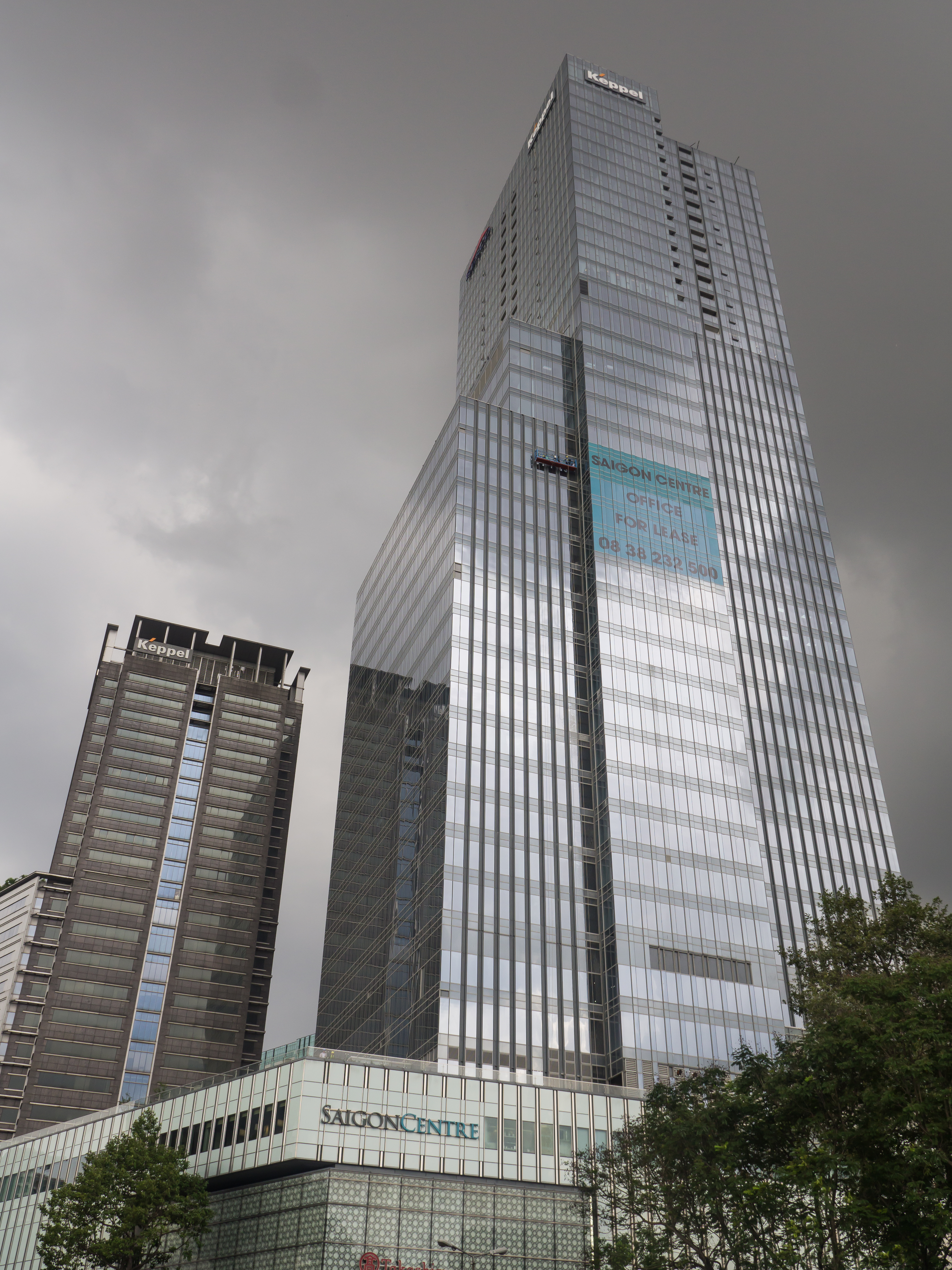
Saigon Centre complex in 2017 with the half obscured Takashimaya logo

Saigon Centre Tower 1 in 2000

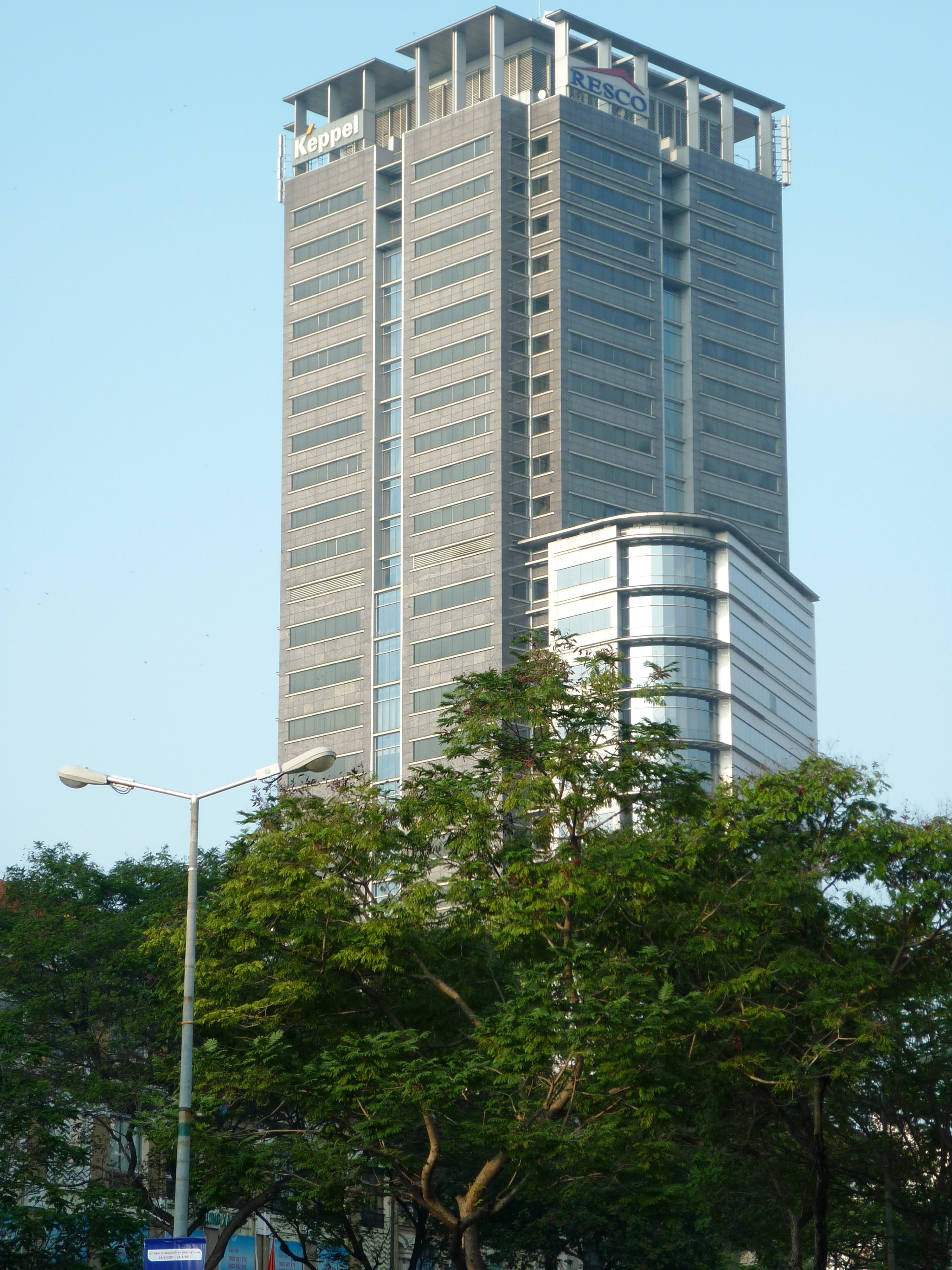
Saigon Centre Tower 1 in 2011

Saigon Centre Tower 2 in 2024

Saigon Centre Mall in 2011 with the former Café Terrace and fcuk store on Pasteur Street

Café Terrace decorated for Christmas in 2012

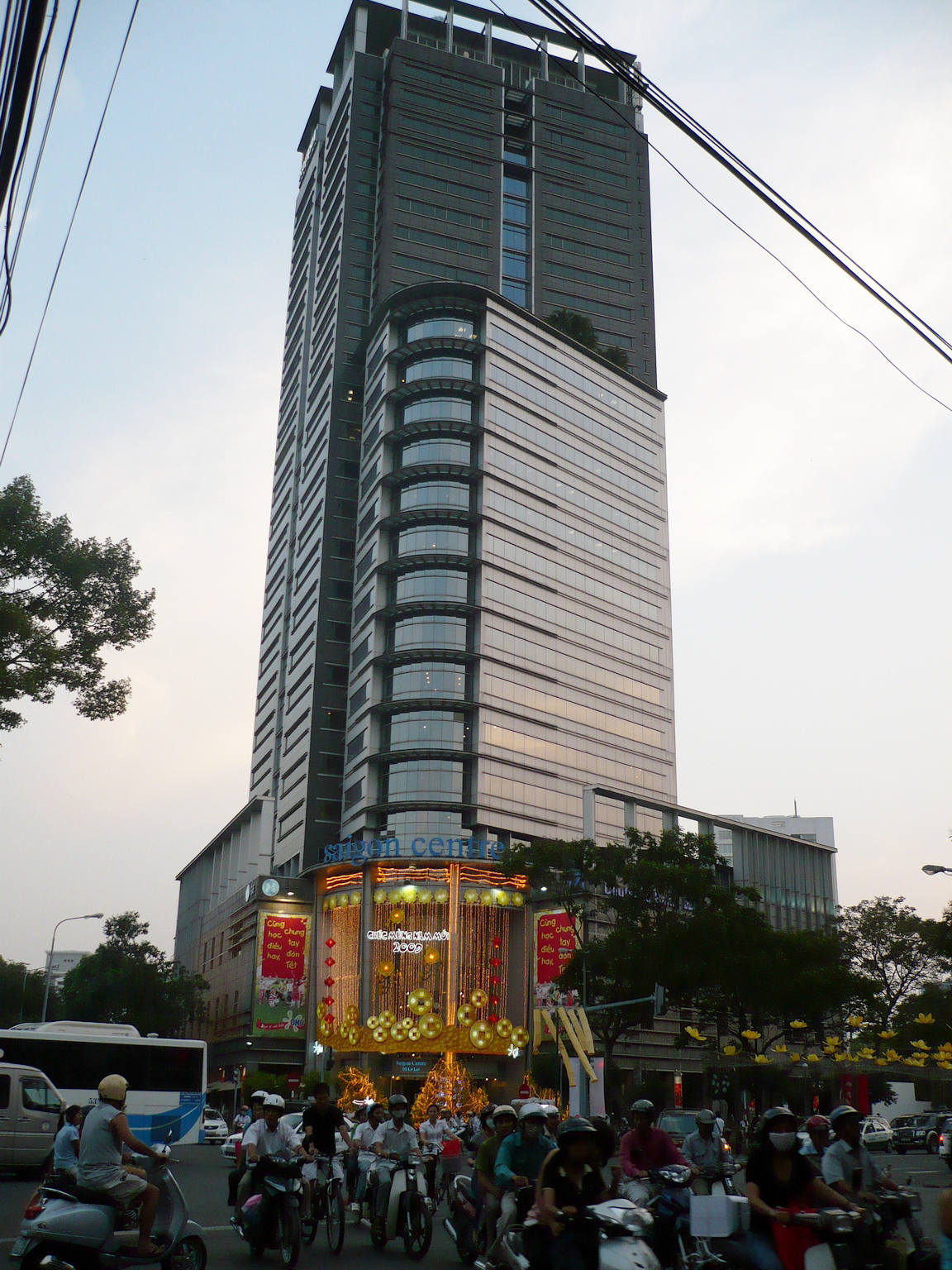
Saigon Centre decorated for 2009 Tết

Saigon Centre decorated for 2011 Tết

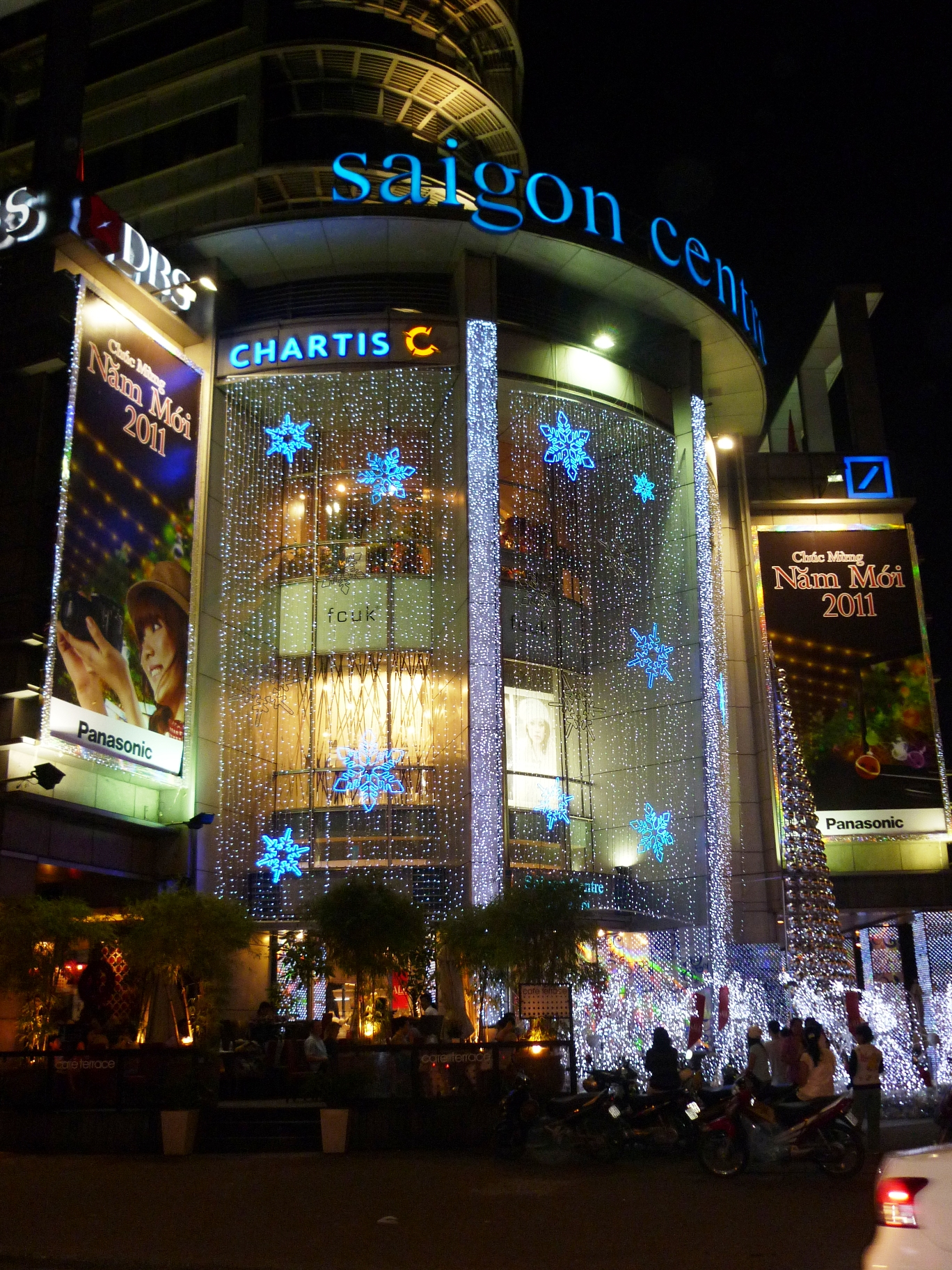
Saigon Centre in 2010 Christmas

Saigon Centre in 2013 Christmas

New Café Terrace on Sky Garden Level 6 of Saigon Centre Tower 2

Saigon Centre 2 in March 2016, 4 months before Takashimaya opened

== See also ==
- Saigon Trade Center
- Sunwah Tower
- Diamond Plaza
- Bitexco Financial Tower
- One Central Saigon
- Crescent Mall
- List of tallest buildings in Vietnam

Records
Preceded by Sunwah Tower	Tallest Building in Vietnam; 1996—1997; 106 m	Succeeded by Saigon Trade Center
Preceded by Sunwah Tower	Tallest Building in Ho Chi Minh City; 1996—1997; 106 m	Succeeded by Saigon Trade Center
