= Nguyễn Huệ Boulevard =

Boulevard in downtown Ho Chi Minh City

- Nguyễn Huệ Pedestrian Boulevard
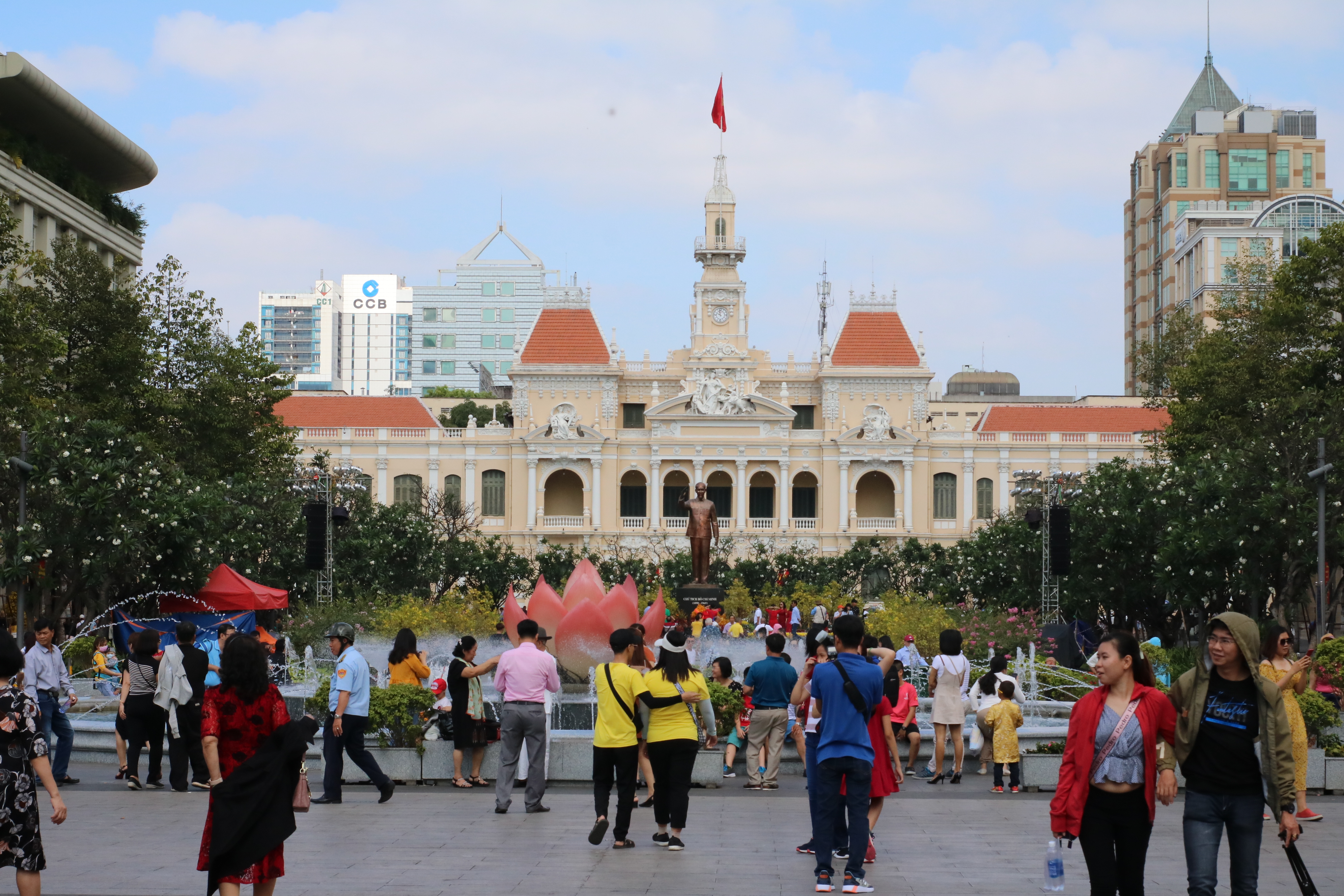
- Ho Chi Minh City Hall as seen from Nguyễn Huệ Boulevard
- Interactive map of Nguyễn Huệ Boulevard
- Native name: Đường Nguyễn Huệ, Đại lộ Nguyễn Huệ, Phố đi bộ Nguyễn Huệ (Vietnamese)
- Former name: Boulevard Charner
- Length: 670 m (2,200 ft)
- Width: 64 metres (210 ft)
- Location: Bến Nghé, District 1, Ho Chi Minh City
- Nearest metro station: L1 Opera House station; L11 Nguyễn Huệ station, Tôn Thất Đạm station (planned)
- Coordinates: 10°46′27″N 106°42′13″E
- Northwest end: Ho Chi Minh City Hall, Lê Thánh Tôn Street
- Major junctions: Lê Lợi Boulevard
- Southeast end: Tôn Đức Thắng Boulevard

Construction
- Completed: 1887; 139 years ago

Nguyễn Huệ Boulevard (Vietnamese: Đường Nguyễn Huệ) is a boulevard in District 1, downtown Ho Chi Minh City, Vietnam. Being one of Saigon's oldest thoroughfares, the boulevard has undergone several transformations; it is currently a famous pedestrian street in the city.

The boulevard stretches from Lê Thánh Tôn Street, right across from Ho Chi Minh City Hall, to Tôn Đức Thắng Boulevard (Bạch Đằng Quay, the Saigon River waterfront).

== History ==
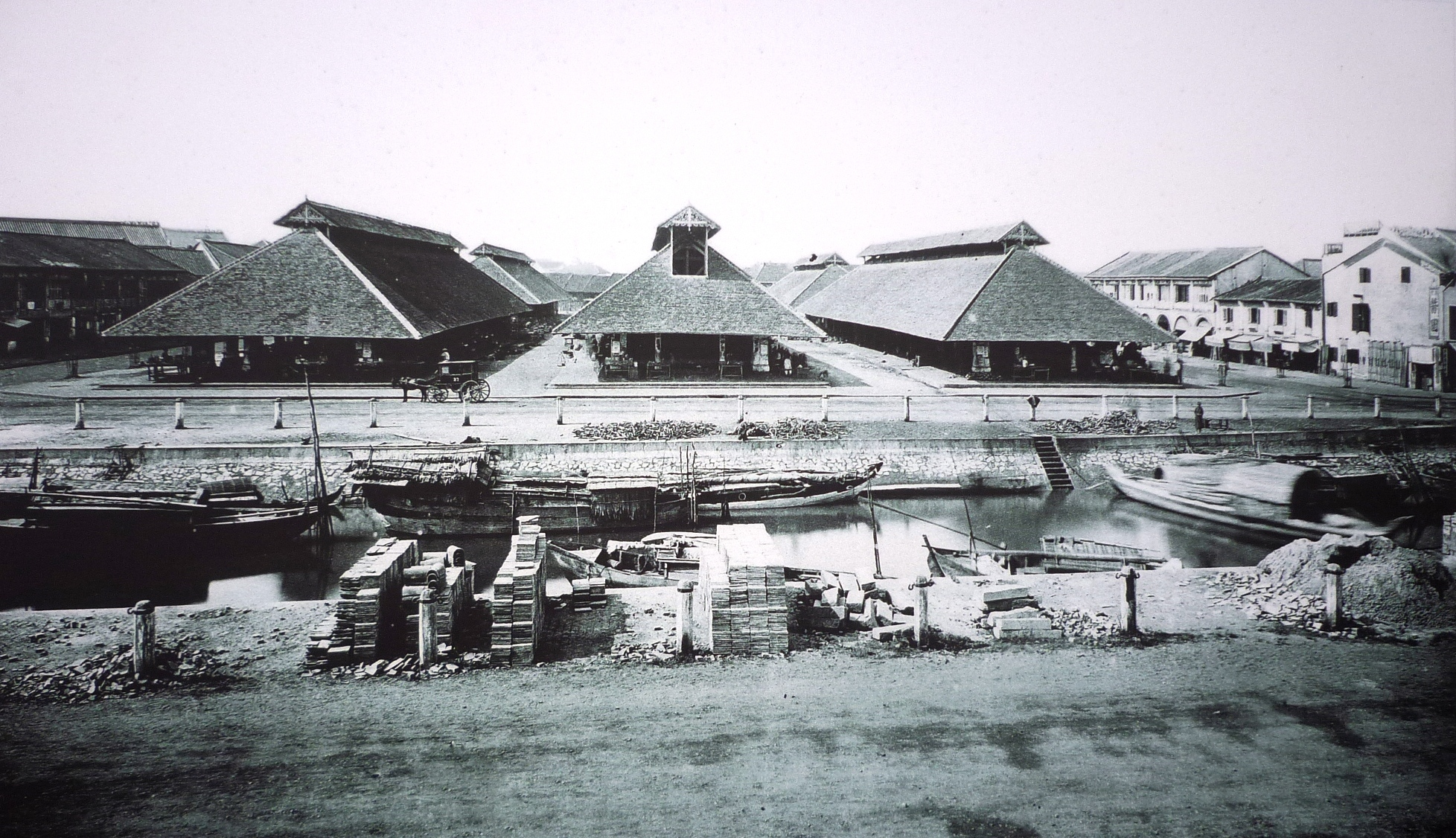
The Grand Canal and the central market

The boulevard was originally a canal known as Kinh Lớn (Grand Canal), which linked the former Citadel of Saigon (the Thành Quy) to Saigon River. In the first two decades after the French conquest of Saigon, the canal remained an important waterway, as the central market was then located on its bank. The two quayside streets along the canal were designated by n° 18, before they were officially named Quai Charner (on the right bank) and Quai Rigault de Genouilly (on the left bank) in 1865. Due to the pestilential odors emanating from the canal, local residents had soon requested that it be filled in. However, it took eighteen years of discussions for this to be achieved in 1886–1887. The resulting wide thoroughfare was henceforth named boulevard Charner.

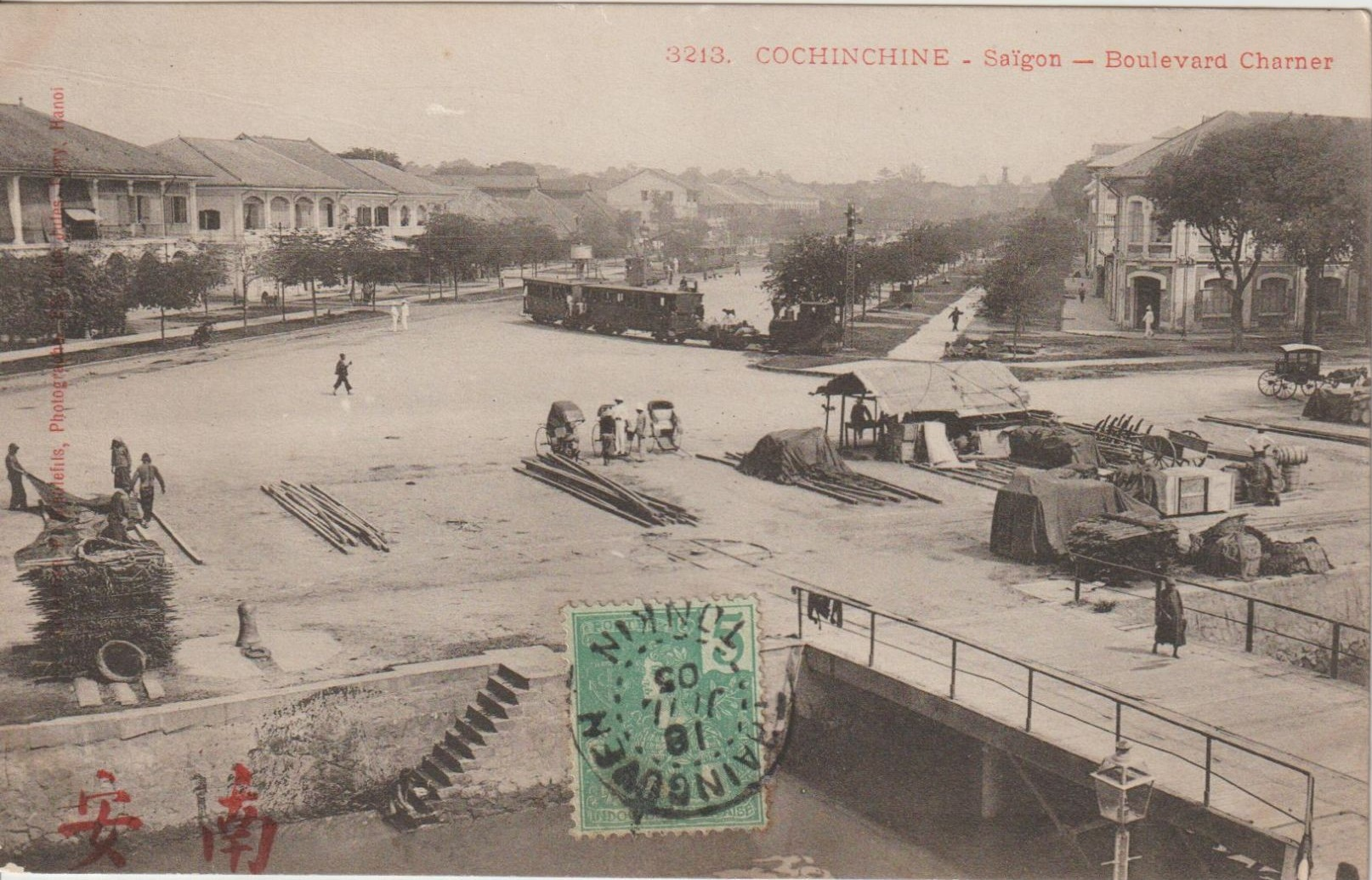
Photo of Boulevard de Charner on a postcard

From 1926, the boulevard had two wide central avenues separated by a thin strip of grass, which was ordered by the former Saigon mayor Rouelle. In 1955, it was renamed Nguyễn Huệ Boulevard by the South Vietnamese government.

=== Nguyen Hue pedestrian street ===
In October 2014, the government of Ho Chi Minh City decided to convert the middle lanes of the boulevard into a pedestrian square. The project was completed on April 29, 2015. During weekend evenings, the entire boulevard is pedestrianized, all vehicles are prohibited during these nights.

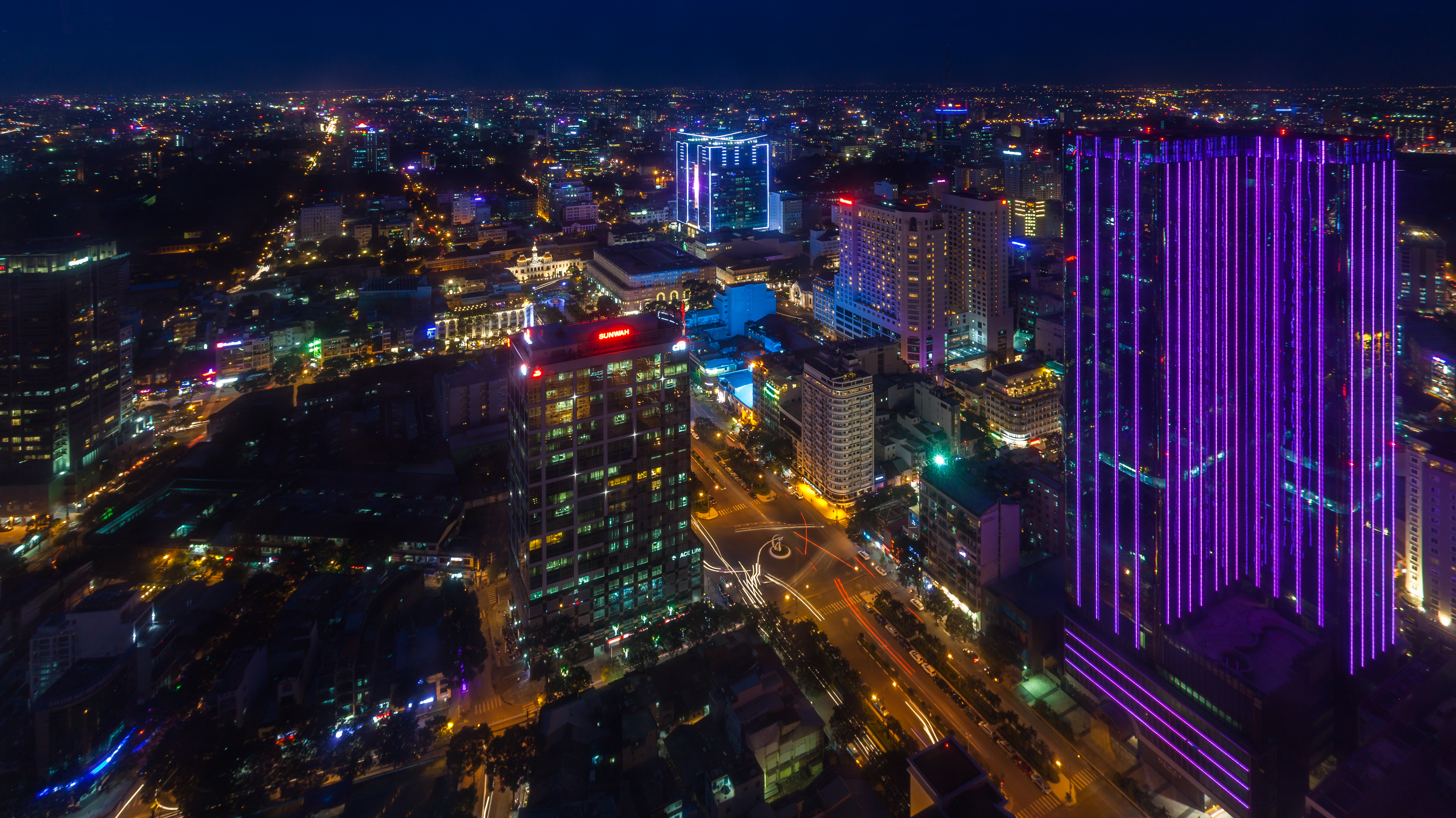
Nguyễn Huệ Boulevard before the convert at night, seen from Bitexco Financial Tower in 2013

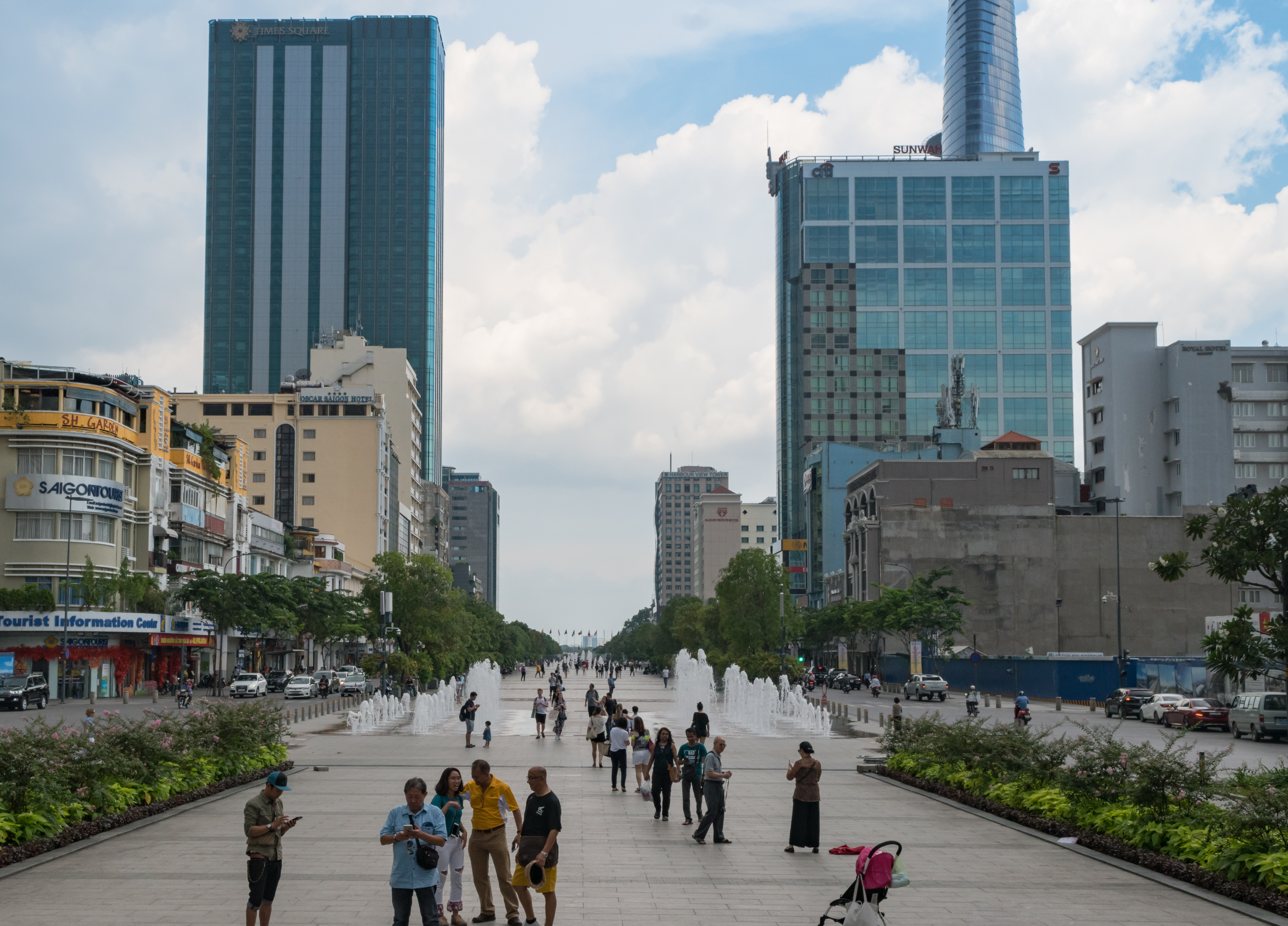
Nguyễn Huệ Boulevard in 2017

== Buildings ==
Numerical odd or even order, odd for West side and even for the East side, starts from Bạch Đằng Quay

Address	Alternative name	Image	Primary user(s) and notes
No. 1 Nguyễn Huệ Boulevard	Ho Chi Minh CIty Customs Department	Ho Chi Minh City Customs Department	Other gates are on 21 Tôn Đức Thắng and No. 2 Hàm Nghi Boulevard
2-4-6 Nguyễn Huệ Boulevard	Hotel Majestic Saigon Expansion (Under construction)		Public park, outdoor digital billboard
3–5–7–9–11 Nguyễn Huệ Boulevard		Dai_Lo_Nguyen_Hue-Bến_Nghé,_Quận_1,_TPHCM,_Việt_Nam_-_panoramio	BenThanh Tourist Office, Cholon Tourist Office
13–15–17 Nguyễn Huệ Boulevard		Dai_Lo_Nguyen_Hue-Bến_Nghé,_Quận_1,_TPHCM,_Việt_Nam_-_panoramio	
8 Nguyễn Huệ Boulevard	Vietnam International Financial Centre Headquarters		Formerly known as Osic Building then Vạn Thịnh Phát Office Service Center
10 Nguyễn Huệ Boulevard	Vinatex Building		
19–25 Nguyễn Huệ Boulevard	Bitexco Office Building (BOB)		Sai Gon Joint Stock Commercial Bank Office
35 Nguyễn Huệ Boulevard	Harbour View Tower		ADVisory Company, Bangkok Bank, Payoo Cooperation
37 Nguyễn Huệ Boulevard	Ho Chi Minh City State Treasury	Tesorería_Nacional,_Ciudad_Ho_Chi_Minh,_Vietnam,_2013-08-14,_DD_01	
55–57 Nguyễn Huệ Boulevard	Amigo Grill Restaurant		
63 Nguyễn Huệ Boulevard	Saigon Prince Hotel		Previously was Duxton Saigon Hotel
87 Nguyễn Huệ Boulevard	The Gangs Restaurant		
99–101 Nguyễn Huệ Boulevard	Saigon Garden Mall		Starbucks, The Coffee Beans
115 Nguyễn Huệ Boulevard	Sunwah Tower	Sunwah Tower in 2013	All Nippon Airways, Air China, Chubb, Citibank Vietnam, Emirates, KPMG, Maybank, Sunwah Group
117–119–121 Nguyễn Huệ Boulevard	BIDV Tower		On hold, currently used for parking
123 Nguyễn Huệ Boulevard	McDonald's Restaurant		
127–129–129A Nguyễn Huệ Boulevard	Fiditourist Office Building		
133 Nguyễn Huệ Boulevard	Kim Đô – Royal Hotel Saigon	Kim Đô Royal Hotel Saigon	
135 Nguyễn Huệ Boulevard	Saigon Tax Trade Centre	Thuong_Xa_Tax,_quan_1,_tpHcm_-_panoramio	Demolished; wait for renovation. Temporaily using as public park
141 Nguyễn Huệ Boulevard	Rex Hotel / Rex Arcade	Rex_Hotel_P1310939	Burberry, Cartier, Chanel, Dolce & Gabbana, Paul & Shark, Rolex, Versace
22–36 Nguyễn Huệ Boulevard	Saigon Times Square		The Reverie Saigon Hotel, The Hour Glass, Deloitte
40–42 Nguyễn Huệ Boulevard	42 Nguyễn Huệ Apartment (Café Apartment)		FAHASA Nguyễn Huệ Bookstore
44 Nguyễn Huệ Boulevard	Trung Thủy Building		Vietinbank, Asia Commercial Bank
56–66 Nguyễn Huệ Boulevard	Palace Saigon Hotel	Palace Saigon Hotel	Calibre Charner Coffee, Highlands Coffee
68 Nguyễn Huệ Boulevard	Vietcomreal Building		
68A Nguyễn Huệ Boulevard	Oscar Saigon Hotel		
72 Nguyễn Huệ Boulevard			Saigon Securities Incorporation (SSI) HQ
74–76 Nguyễn Huệ Boulevard			Viettronimex JSC, Ciao Café and Lounge
98–100–102 Nguyễn Huệ Boulevard	Saigontourist Travel Service Office		Sky Zone Beer Garden
110 Nguyễn Huệ Boulevard	Ho Chi Minh Monument	Saigon_Town_Hall_-_Flickr_-_radkuch.13	Previously known as Đống Đa Park
116 Nguyễn Huệ Boulevard	Union Square Saigon		Bulgari, Dior, Fendi, Hermès, Louis Vuitton, Tiffany & Co., Mandarin Oriental Hotel, Saigon, Starbucks

== Public transportation ==
=== Buses ===
Being a tourist street, tourist buses are commonly seen on the Nguyễn Huệ Boulevard.

=== Metro ===
Ho Chi Minh City Metro Line 1 crosses beneath Nguyễn Huệ Boulevard. The nearest station, the Opera House station has many exits to the boulevard.

== Nguyen Hue Flower Street ==
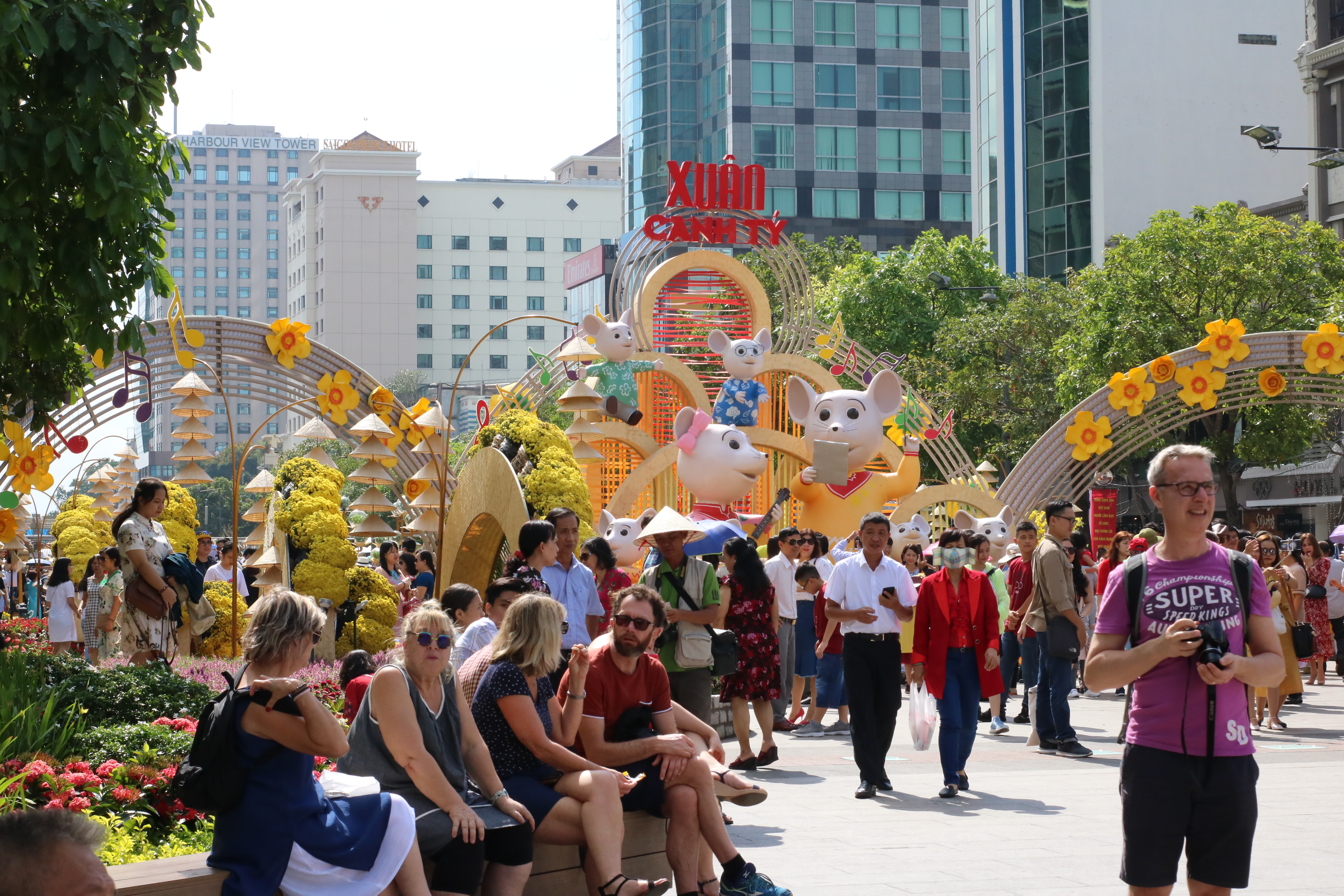
Nguyễn Huệ Boulevard being decorated with flowers and miniature landscapes in 2020. This is an annual festival since 2004 to celebrate Tết.

Nguyen Hue Flower Street, or natively known as Đường hoa Nguyễn Huệ, is the common name of Nguyễn Huệ Boulevard during the lunar new year festival. During the festival, the street is decorated for the occasion and are exclusively for pedestrians. The tradition started in 2004, which previously known as Flower Market Nguyễn Huệ.

During the 20th century, the street is commonly a marketplace for trading flowers during the end of the lunar years. Vendors would come from the port at Bạch Đằng Quay. As such, during these years, the street is a common attraction for citizens to sightseeing and enjoy the Tết atmosphere.

After 2003, the city relocated the flower market to 23 Tháng 9 park. In 2004, the city started the tradition to set up flowers decoration on the street, designated as a sightseeing area during new year times. Since then, the name Nguyen Hue flower street is born. The street during this time is for pedestrians, and transportations are forbidden on the street.

In February 2015, the boulevard was under construction, so the Flower Street event was held on the nearby Hàm Nghi Boulevard. Following the boulevard's conversion into a pedestrian street, the tradition continues, with flowers decorated during the new year time. Motorbike routes continued to be blocked, but this time with additional nearby streets like Lê Lợi. During Tet 2023, in addition to the Flower Street, a book street event was held on Lê Lợi Boulevard.

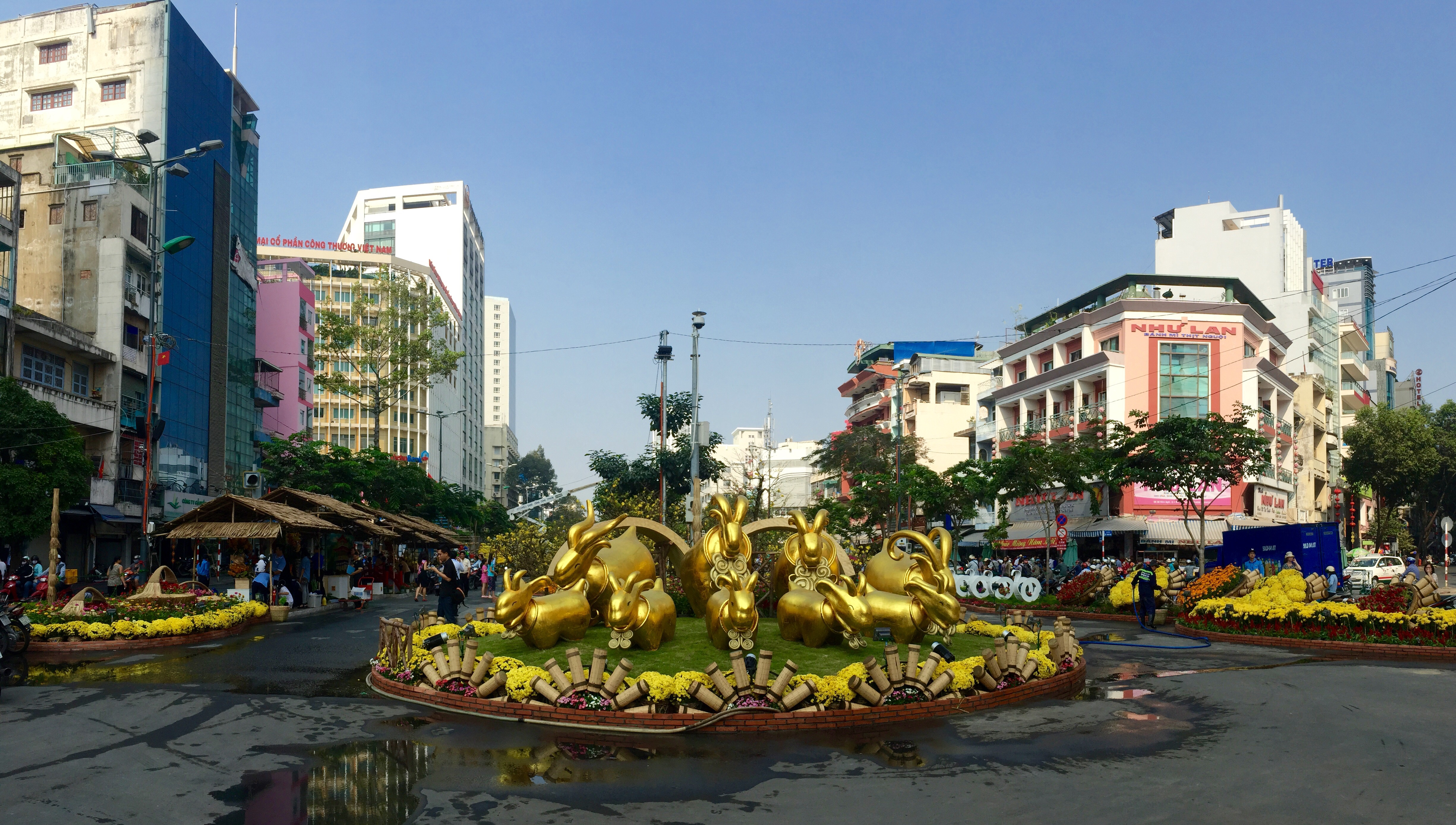
Hàm Nghi Boulevard being the Flower Street in 2015, substituted for then under construction Nguyễn Huệ Boulevard

The Nguyễn Huệ flower street are considered to be a culture and tourist event during the new year time, attract many citizens, tourists, as well as home-coming overseas Vietnamese.

== See also ==
- Lê Lợi Boulevard
- Đồng Khởi Street
- Hàm Nghi Boulevard
