= The Coffee House (coffeehouse chain) =

Vietnamese coffee shop chain

- Industry: Coffee shop
- Founded: 2014
- Number of locations: 140 (2018)
- Area served: Vietnam
- Key people: Nguyễn Hải Ninh (CEO, founder)
- Revenue: ₫669 billion (2018)
- Net income: ₫2 billion (2018)
- Website: thecoffeehouse.com

The Coffee House is a Vietnamese coffeehouse chain, created in 2014. It is based in Ho Chi Minh City.

== History ==
As of March 2018, the chain has over 100 stores across Vietnam that serve over 40,000 customers a day. The CEO Nguyen Hai Ninh announced that the company plans to open as many as 700 outlets across Vietnam.

The chain has been described as one of local Vietnamese coffeehouse chains, together with Highlands Coffee or Cong Ca Phe, that are together more popular in Vietnam than global chains like Starbucks.

In 2018, The Coffee House was second on Vietnamese coffee chain market in terms of revenue, after Highlands Coffee, and fourth in terms of profit (after Highlands Coffee, Starbucks and Phúc Long).

In 2019, The Coffee House's revenue had an increase of nearly 30% compared to 2018, reaching 863 million VND.

Up until 2022, The Coffee House is owned by Seedcom - owner of a retail ecosystem including many companies including Juno, AhaMove, Giao Hang Nhanh, etc.,

June 2022, The Coffee House increased its charter capital from VND108.4 billion to VND120.6 billion, in which Ficus Asia Investment, an investment firm registered in Singapore and was founded by Mr. Dinh Anh Huan - co-founder of Mobile World and Seedcom, gained more than 23% of the shares.

== See also ==
- Cộng Coffee
- Highlands Coffee
- Măng Đeng Coffee
