= Saigon Trade Center =

Coordinates: 10°47′2.5″N 106°42′11.76″E

- Cao ốc Trung tâm Thương mại Sài Gòn
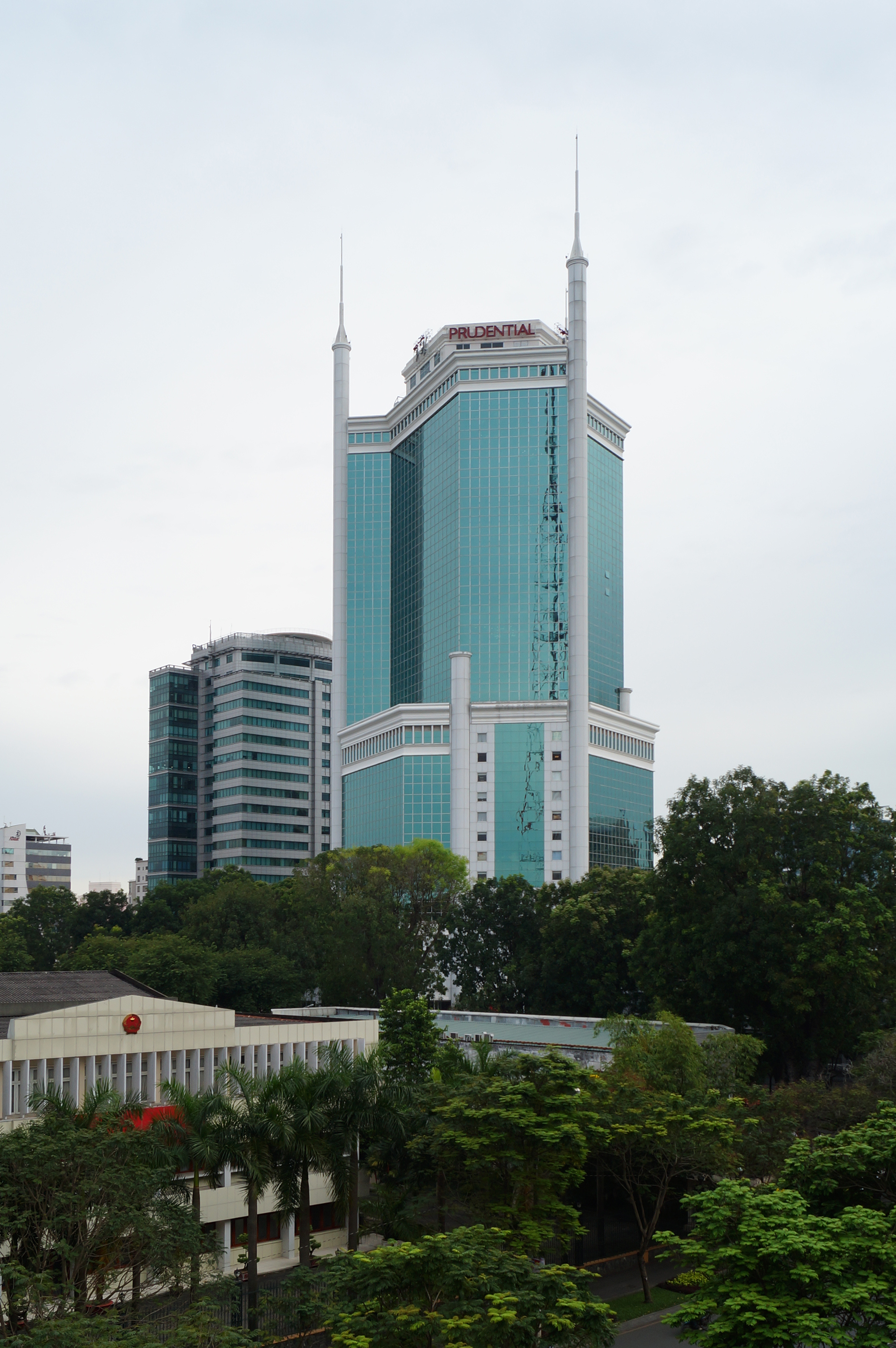
- Saigon Trade Center in 2013, looked from place of Cộng Hòa Barracks

Record height
- Tallest in Vietnam from 1997 to 2010^{[I]}
- Preceded by: Saigon Centre Tower 1
- Surpassed by: Bitexco Financial Tower

General information
- Status: Completed
- Type: Office, retail, restaurant
- Architectural style: Post-modern
- Location: 37 Tôn Đức Thắng Boulevard, Bến Nghé ward, District 1, Ho Chi Minh City, Vietnam
- Construction started: April 1994
- Completed: 1997
- Opening: July 1997

Height
- Antenna spire: 160 m (520 ft)
- Roof: 145 m (476 ft)
- Top floor: 137 m (449 ft)

Technical details
- Floor count: 33 (and 2 underground)
- Floor area: 55,792 m^{2} (600,540 sq ft)
- Lifts/elevators: 12

Design and construction
- Architect: WMKY Architects Engineer Ltd.
- Developer: LUKS Industrial Ltd.

Other information
- Public transit: L1 Ba Son station; L3 Hoa Lư station (proposed)

Website
- saigontradecenter.info

Saigon Trade Center (Vietnamese: Trung tâm Thương mại Sài Gòn) is a high-rise building in Ho Chi Minh City, Vietnam. It was constructed from April 1994 and completed in July 1997 and with a height of 160 metres (525 ft), the tower was the tallest building in Vietnam from 1997 until 2010, when it was surpassed by the Bitexco Financial Tower.

The building has 33 floors with a GFA of over 54,000 sqm, built by reinforced concrete and glass cladding for exterior. There are 10 elevators used for customers, 2 elevators used for service purpose only. The building has three spires, which make the total height of the building increase to 160 meters. On the roof of the building, there was a coffee shop called Panorama 33 then a beer club named One Plus, where visitors can observe the city view. However, both were no longer operated and the top floors are also not opened for visitors.

== Floor plan ==
Floor	Purpose
30-33	Bar, restaurant (Currently closed permanently)
6-30	Office
2-5	Retail
1	Entrance hall, Retail
B1-B2	Parking

=== Major tenants ===
Some major offices and retail area tenants of the building: Prudential Vietnam Assurance Private, Hansgrohe, NTT Data, Acer, Cisco, Standard Chartered, Vietcombank, M-TP Entertainment, TNGo Public Bike Service, Chinese Visa Application Service Center in Ho Chi Minh City, Highlands Coffee, Wayne's Coffee, Tous les Jours, Guta Cafe, Rohto Pharmaceutical.

Records
Preceded by Saigon Centre	Tallest Building in Vietnam; 1997—2010; 145 m	Succeeded by Bitexco Financial Tower
Preceded by Saigon Centre	Tallest Building in Ho Chi Minh City; 1997—2010; 145 m	Succeeded by Bitexco Financial Tower
