= Cộng Cà Phê =

Vietnamese coffeehouse chain

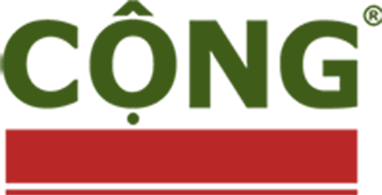
- Industry: Restaurant
- Genre: Coffeehouse
- Founded: 2007; 19 years ago in Hanoi, Vietnam
- Founder: Linh Dung
- Area served: Vietnam, South Korea, Malaysia, Philippines, Taiwan, Canada, France
- Website: congcaphe.com

Cộng Cà Phê (or Cong Caphe) is a Vietnamese chain of coffeehouses. In 2007, former singer Linh Dung opened the first Cộng Cà Phê on Trieu Viet Vuong street in Hanoi. As of 2025, the chain operates more than 100 cafes on three continents.

The brand's outlets have a retro, quasi-military style, reflecting nostalgia for Vietnam's subsidy period in the 1970s and 1980s. The cafes are painted olive green and decorated with military memorabilia. The Vietnamese-style coffees are prepared with condensed milk or coconut milk, and often feature flavors such as mung bean or green rice.

Domestically-owned coffeehouse chains have been very successful within Vietnam. Nikkei Asia reported that businesses like Cộng Cà Phê, Highlands Coffee and the Coffee House are together more popular in Vietnam than chains like Starbucks.

In 2013, Vietnamese police investigated complaints that the store's use of images of communist leaders such as Karl Marx, Vladimir Lenin, Mao Zedong, and Fidel Castro in their advertising was disrespectful to the country's leadership. The chain opened its first North American outpost in Toronto in 2023, and its first European location in Paris in 2025.
