= Citibank Vietnam =

- Type: Subsidiary
- Founded: 1993
- Headquarters: Headquarters: 1st Floor, 17 Ngô Quyền Street, Hoàn Kiếm, Hanoi; Branch: 15th Floor, 115 Nguyễn Huệ Boulevard, Saigon, Ho Chi Minh City
- Key people: Ramachandran A.S., Citi Country Officer
- Products: Financial services
- Website: citibank.com.vn

Citibank Vietnam is a bank which set its first footprint in Vietnam in 1975, and then started up a representative office in Hanoi in 1993. A year later, Citi became the first U.S. financial institution licensed for branch opening and full branch establishment in Hanoi a year later. Citi has two branches in Vietnam, one in Hanoi and one in Ho Chi Minh City.

On January 13, 2022, Citigroup announced that it will sell its consumer banking businesses in Vietnam, Malaysia, Thailand, and Indonesia to United Overseas Bank of Singapore.

== History ==
Citibank Vietnam HQ at International Centre Building, Hanoi

Citibank, N. A. is the primary U.S. banking subsidiary of financial services multinational Citigroup. Citibank was founded in 1812 as the City Bank of New York in New York City, and later became First National City Bank of New York. The bank has 2,649 branches in 19 countries.

Citibank first opened a branch in Vietnam prior to 1975. In 1993, Citi returned to Vietnam and established a representative office in Hanoi. A year later, Citi became the first U.S. financial institution to be granted a license to open a full-service branch in Hanoi at the International Centre Building. In 1998, Citi opened a second branch in Ho Chi Minh City at the Sunwah Tower.

Sunwah Tower. Location of Ho Chi Minh City branch

Citi established its retail banking franchise in Vietnam in 2009 and in recent years, Citi's retail banking business has grown rapidly, with market share gains in key businesses such as credit cards, personal loans, cash withdrawals, and insurance. In late 2014, Citi launched its SME banking service in Vietnam.

== Products and services ==
Citi offers banking services including retail banking, corporate banking, investment banking and global transaction services, including trade and treasury services, and securities and fund services.

=== Digital wallet support ===
Citibank Vietnam credit cards only support Samsung Pay. Google Pay and Apple Pay are not supported.

== See also ==
- List of banks in Vietnam
