= Dim Tu Tac =

Cantonese restaurant chain in Ho Chi Minh City, Vietnam

Dim Tu Tac Trading Service Joint Stock Company
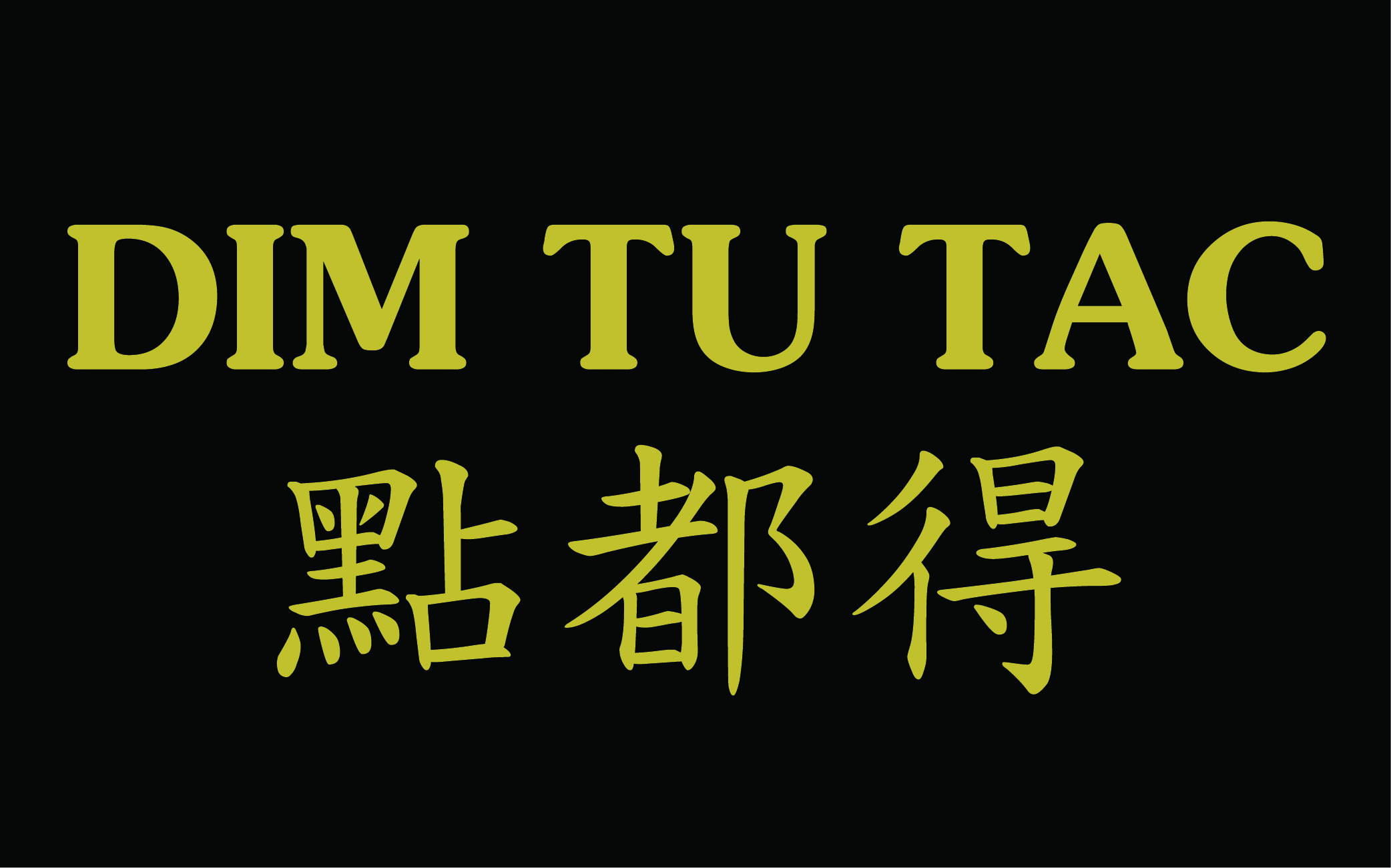

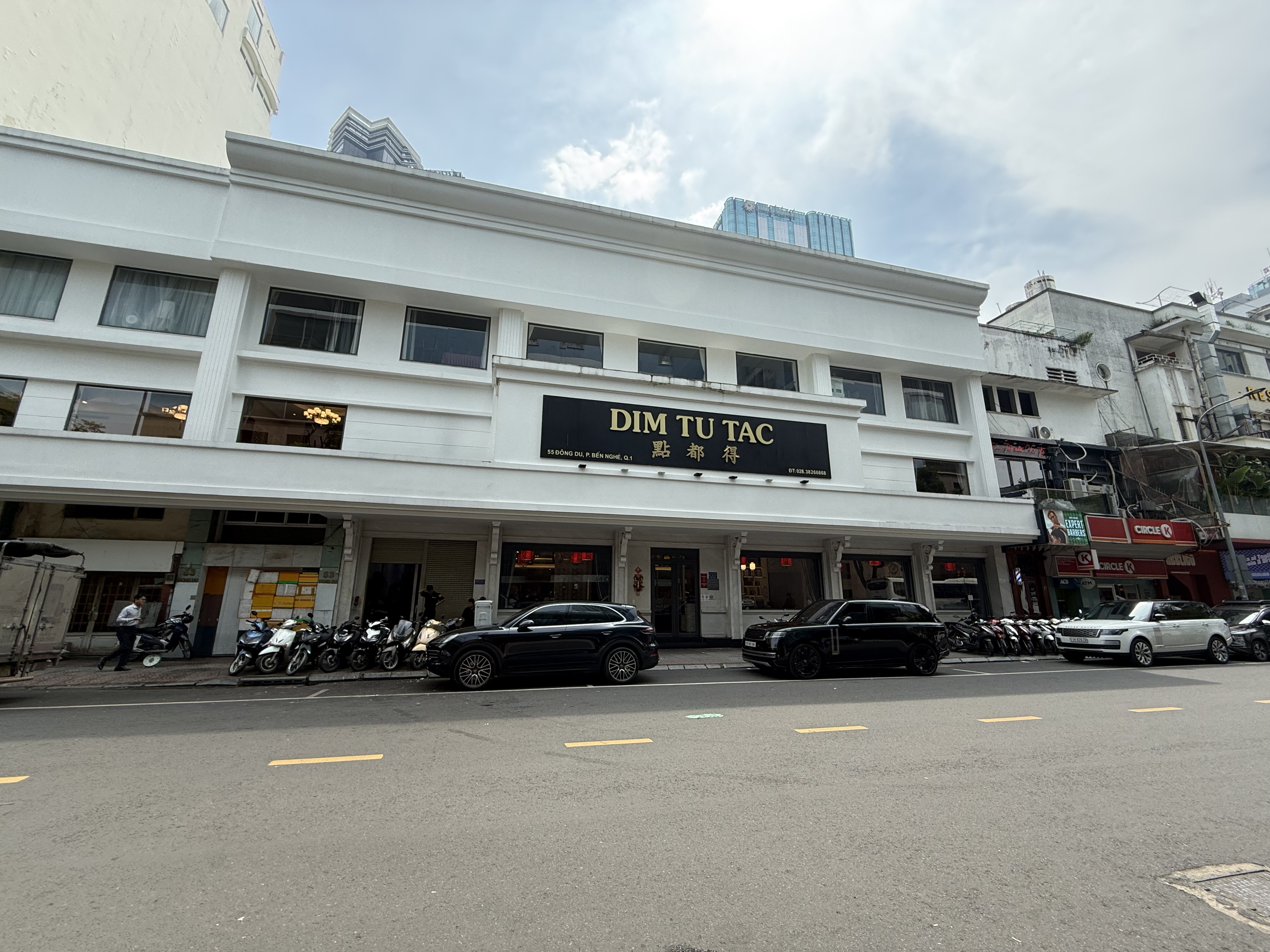
- Location at 55 Đông Du Street, Saigon Ward, Ho Chi Minh City
- Trade name: Dim Tu Tac
- Native name: 點都得
- Industry: Food and beverage, Hospitality
- Founded: 2015
- Headquarters: Ho Chi Minh City, Vietnam
- Number of locations: 6 restaurants (2025)
- Products: Dim sum, Peking duck
- Website: www.dimtutac.com

Dim Tu Tac (Chinese: 點都得) is a restaurant chain in Ho Chi Minh City, Vietnam specializing in Cantonese cuisine, particularly famous for their dim sum and Peking duck. Founded in 2015, it has since become one of the most popular restaurants in Ho Chi Minh City and has been awarded the Michelin Bib Gourmand selection in 2023 and 2024.

== Etymology ==
In Cantonese, 'Dim Tu Tac' means "anything you want" or "anything is possible." The name suggests the aim to establish the restaurant as the go-to place for the most genuine and diverse Cantonese food experiences.

== History ==
In early 2015, the brand was founded with its first restaurant in District 4. It was then followed by branches at Tân Sơn Nhất Hotel in Phú Nhuận District, next to 7th Military Region headquarters and the same name arena and stadium, District 5 in Queen Plaza Convention and Wedding Center on Trần Hưng Đạo Boulevard in the end of the same year and District 10 in 2017.

The District 4 branch was officially moved to District 1 on Đông Du Street on January 21, 2018.

On November 26, 2019, the first branch located in a shopping mall opened in Saigon Centre.

Dim Tu Tac continues to expand with two new branches in shopping malls in 2023, including the Estella Place branch on Hanoi Highway in An Phú, Thủ Đức (formerly District 2) opened on June 2, followed by the Hùng Vương Plaza branch on Hồng Bàng Boulevard, District 5 on November 16. On June 6, Dim Tu Tac was awarded the Bib Gourmand distinction for the first time when Hanoi & Ho Chi Minh City made their debut in the Michelin Guide.

On June 27, 2024, Dim Tu Tac received the Bib Gourmand distinction in the second edition of the Michelin Guide in Vietnam. In October, Dim Tu Tac launched its newest branch at Cobi Tower II, the first branch to open in an office tower in Phú Mỹ Hưng urban area, District 7. At the 25th Macao Food Festival, Dim Tu Tac was the only representative from Vietnam to participate in the Macao International Chinese Cuisine Chef Competition 2025, organized by Galaxy Entertainment Group. In this competition featuring Chinese chefs from reputable F&B brands around the world, chefs from Dim Tu Tac won two awards: “Creative Dim Sum Dish” (Lee Kum Kee Innovation Award) and “First Runner-Up for Main Kitchen Dish."

On 19 July 2026, after more than a decade of operating in Ho Chi Minh City's traditional Chinatown area - Chợ Lớn, the District 5 branch relocated to a new venue at Topaz City on Cao Lỗ Street, District 8. The new location became the brand's third branch situated within a residential apartment complex.

== Products ==
=== Menu ===
The restaurant's à la carte menu includes dim sum, soups, fried rice & noodles, Cantonese roast dishes (BBQ), vegetarian dishes, and other regional dishes from Sichuan and Shanghai. Their signature dishes are:

- Prawn Dumpling (Har gow)
- Peking Duck
- Abalone Kungfu Soup
- Hong Kong Steamed Fish with Soy Sauce
- Braised Abalone with Oyster Sauce

It also offers monthly special menus, with new dishes being introduced on a regular basis to provide seasonal, diverse tastes to diners. Their Mother’s Day menu is given special focus each year.

=== Seasonal Products ===
The restaurant chain also sells traditional Chinese festival food, such as Niangao during Lunar New Year, Rice Dumpling (Zongzi) on Duanwu Festival, and Mooncakes in Mid-Autumn Festival. Tangyuan are gifted to guests in the Lantern Festival and Winter Solstice.

Selected dishes served at Dim Tu Tac

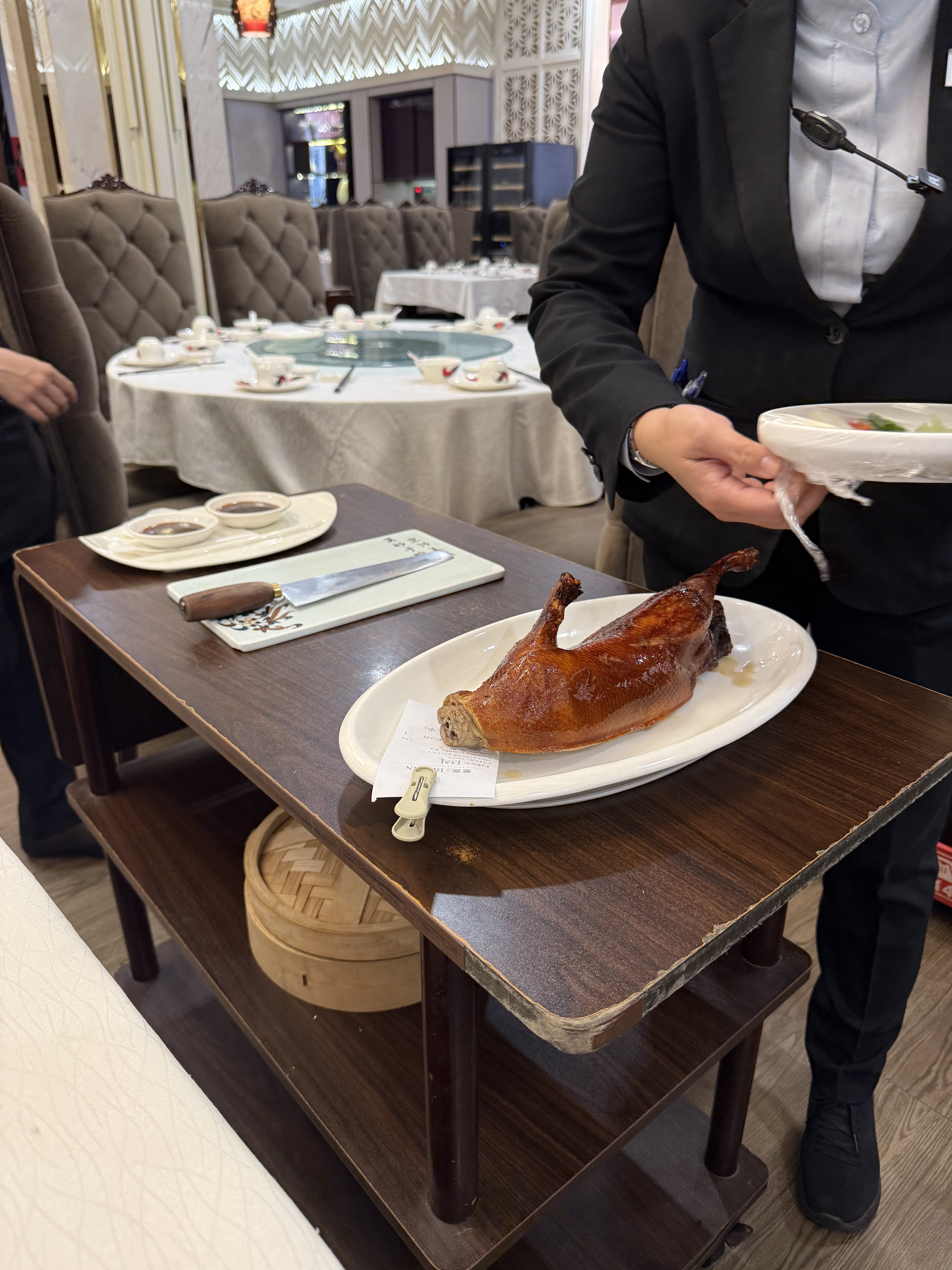
Peking duck

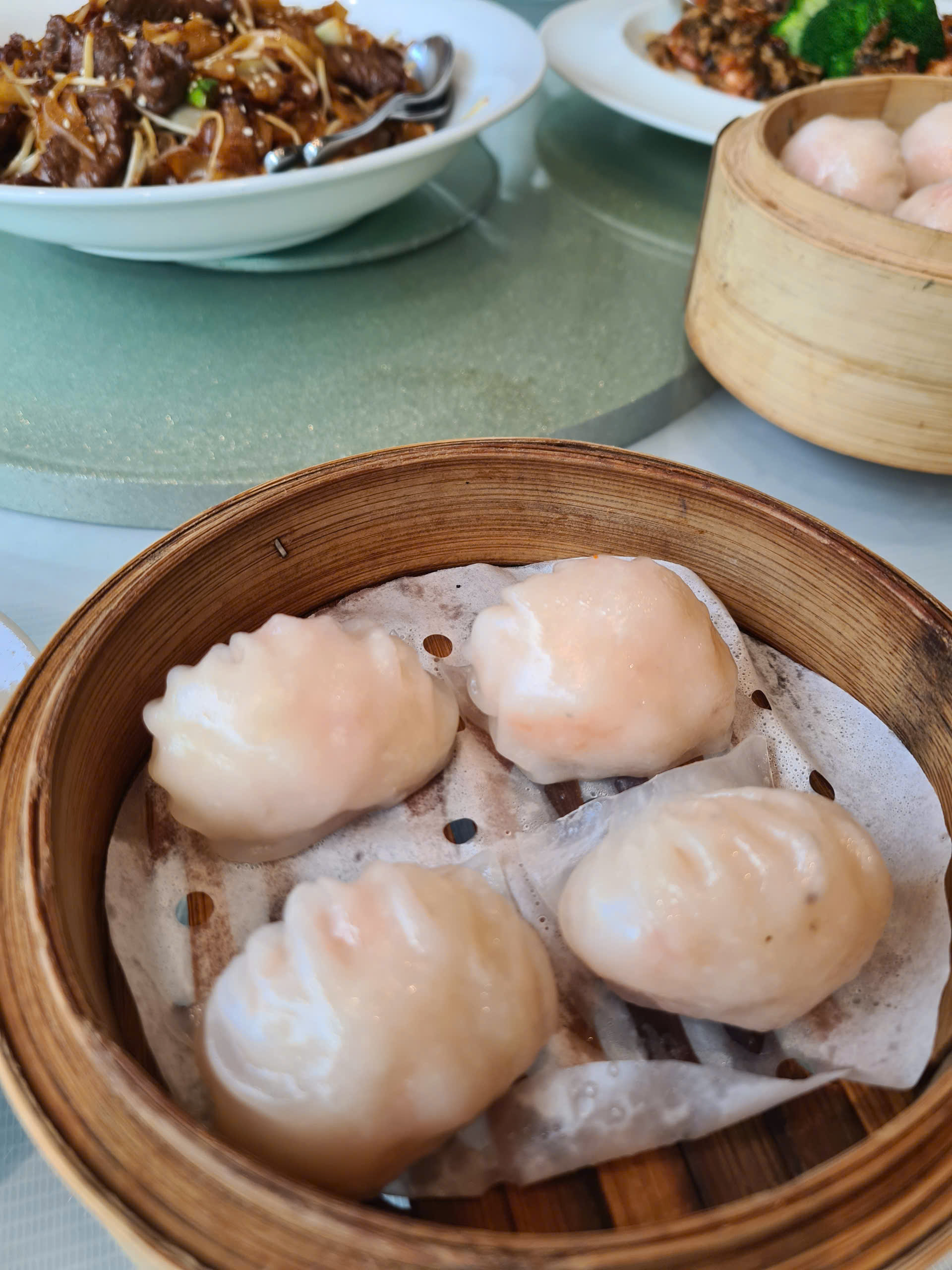
Har gow

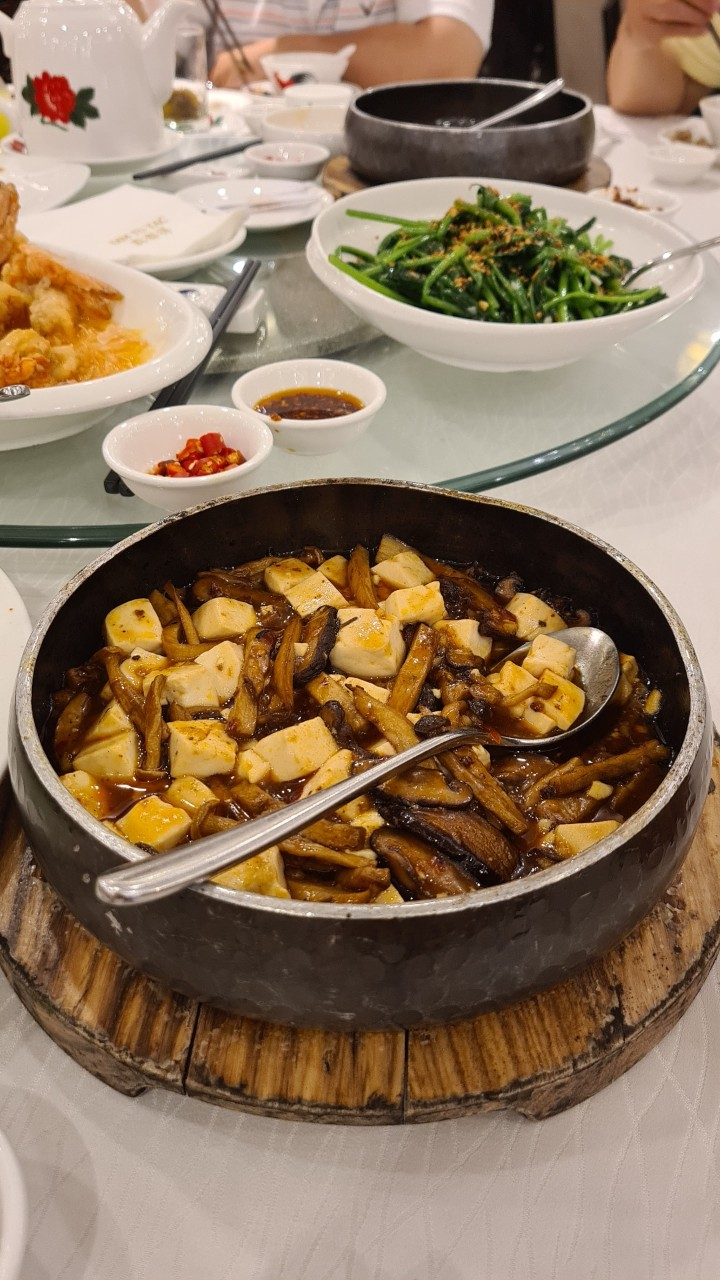
Mapo tofu

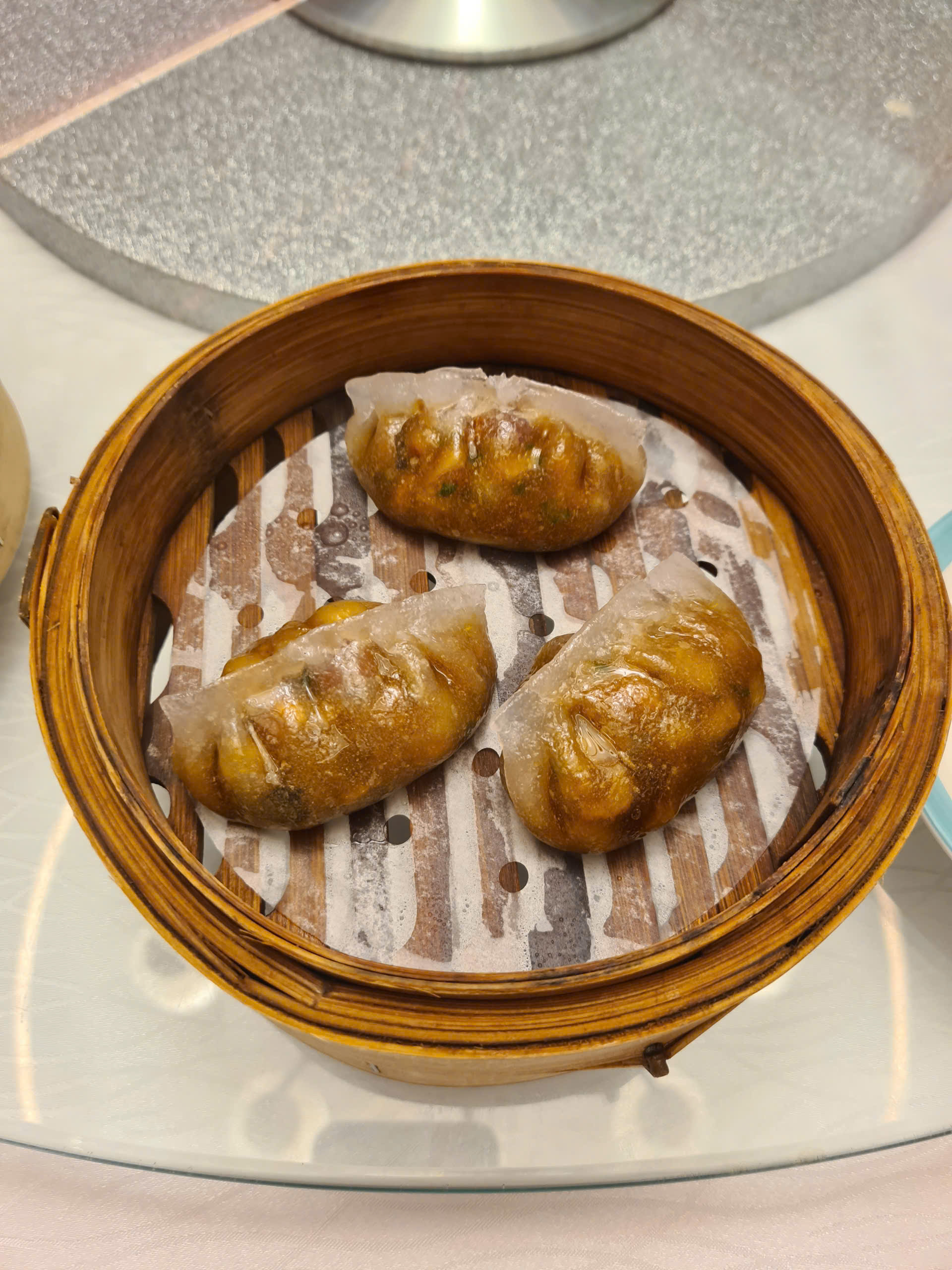
Fun guo

== Honours ==
- Bib Gourmand in the MICHELIN Guide Hanoi & Ho Chi Minh City (2023)
- Bib Gourmand in the MICHELIN Guide Hanoi, Ho Chi Minh City & Da Nang (2024)
- Main Dish First Runner-Up in the Macao International Chinese Cuisine Chef Competition (2025)
- Creative Dim Sum Dish (Lee Kum Kee Innovation Award) in the Macao International Chinese Cuisine Chef Competition (2025)

== Locations ==
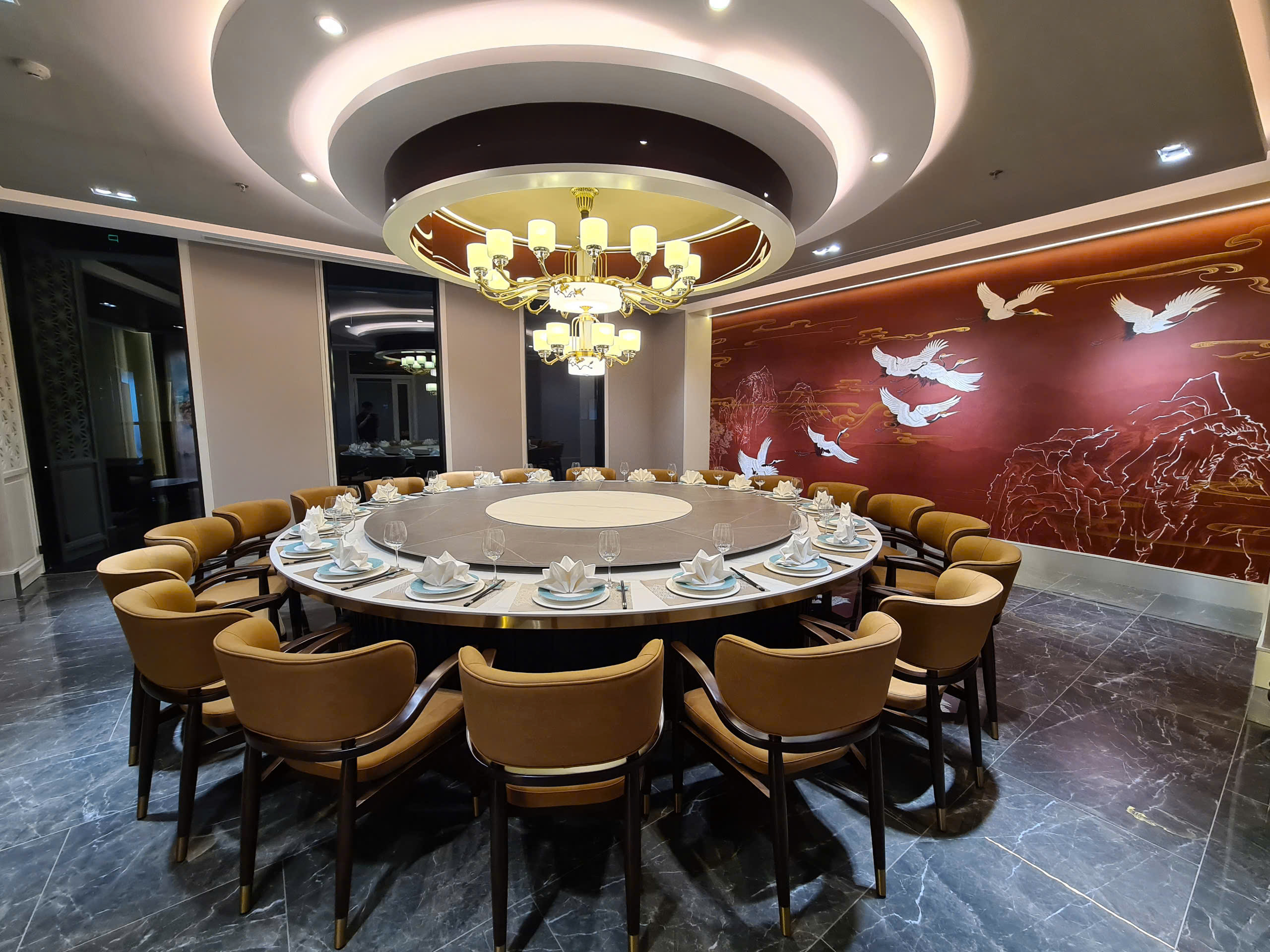
Dining room at the Cobi Tower II location

The chain currently has six branches in Ho Chi Minh City, including:

- Đông Du Branch: 55 Đông Du Street, Saigon ward
- Saigon Centre Branch: 5th Floor, Saigon Centre - 65 Lê Lợi Boulevard, Saigon ward
- Estella Place Branch: 4th Floor, Estella Place - 88 Song Hành Street, Bình Trưng ward
- Hung Vuong Plaza Branch: 3rd Floor, Hùng Vương Plaza - 126 Hồng Bàng Boulebard, Chợ Lớn ward
- Cobi Tower II Branch: 2nd Floor, Cobi Tower II - 2-4 Street No. 8, Tân Mỹ ward
- Topaz City Branch: Topaz City Apartment - 39 Cao Lỗ Street, Chánh Hưng ward
