= Sunwah Tower =

High-rise, multi-purpose building in Ho Chi Minh City

Coordinates: 10.7717°N 106.7040°E

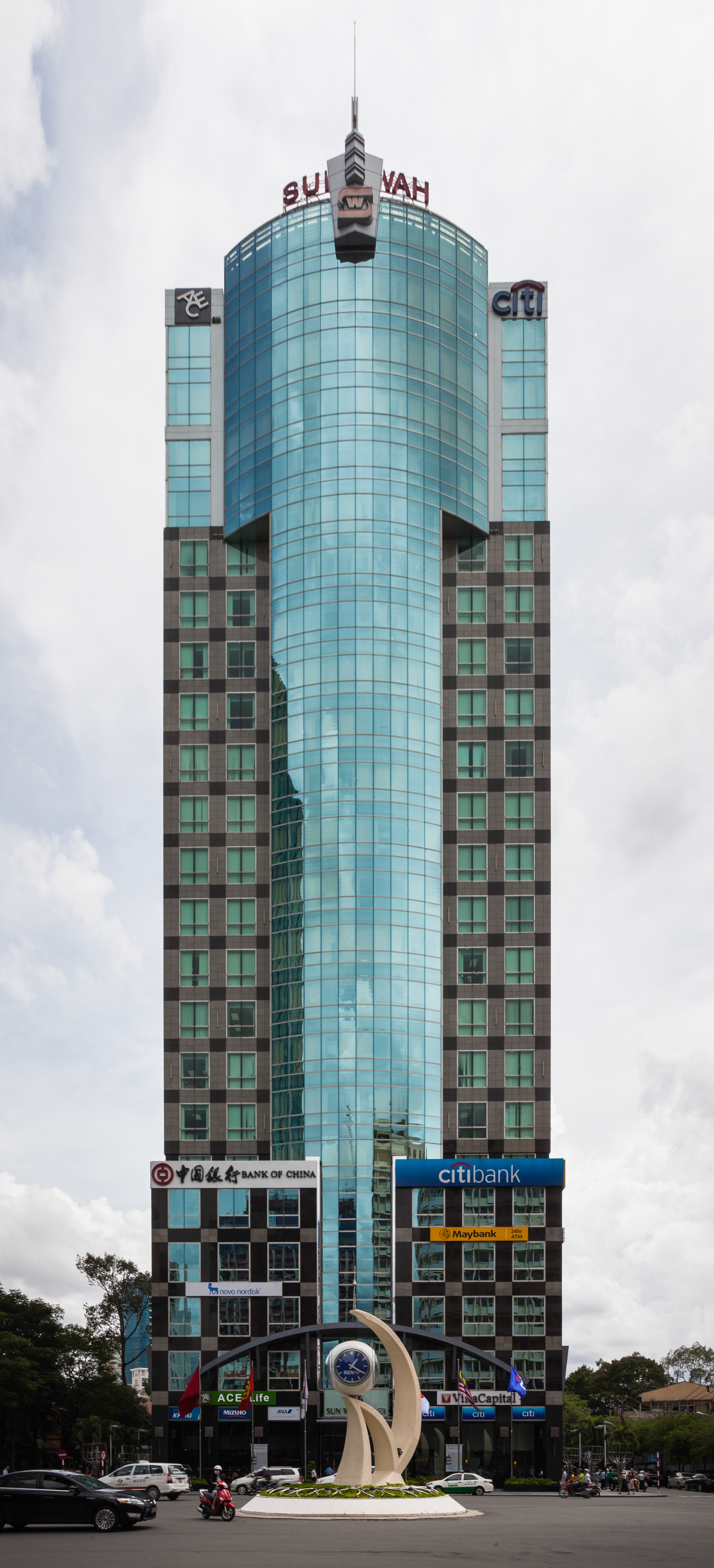
- Sunwah Tower in 2013
- Alternative names: Sun Wah Tower

Record height
- Tallest in Vietnam from 1995 to 1996^{[I]}
- Preceded by: VTP Office Service Center
- Surpassed by: Saigon Centre Tower 1

General information
- Status: Completed
- Type: Office; Café
- Location: 115 Nguyễn Huệ Boulevard, Bến Nghé, District 1, Ho Chi Minh City, Vietnam
- Construction started: 1993
- Completed: 1995
- Inaugurated: 1997
- Owner: Sun Wah Group; Marubeni

Height
- Roof: 92 meters (302 ft)

Technical details
- Floor count: 21 (3 underground)
- Floor area: Total: 20,800 square metres (224,000 sq ft); Grade A Office: 15,000 square metres (160,000 sq ft)
- Lifts/elevators: 7

Design and construction
- Architect: EaWes Corporation
- Main contractor: Shimizu Corporation

Other information
- Public transit: 1 Opera House station

Website
- sunwahtower.com

Sunwah Tower or Sun Wah Tower is a high-rise Grade A office building in Ho Chi Minh City, Vietnam. Originally developed and owned by Sun Wah Group and Marubeni, designed by Los Angeles architects Archeon Group.

The building comprises 21 floors and 3 basements used for parking. There are 6 elevators used for customers and 1 elevator for service purpose only. It was opened in 1995 and was the tallest building in Vietnam then with 92 meters until Saigon Centre Tower 1 surpassed it with 106 meters.

== General information ==
=== Specification ===
- Total net area: 20,800 m^{2} (224,000 sq ft)
- Typical net floor plate: 1,166 m^{2} (12,550 sq ft)
- Ceiling Height: 2.7 m (8.9 ft)
- Total number of lifts: 6 passenger lifts and 1 service lift
- Air conditioning: Centralised
- Fire security: International standard sprinklers, smoke detectors and fire alarm system

=== Location ===
Sunwah Tower is located at a city block that is surrounded by Nguyễn Huệ Boulevard (main entrance), Tôn Thất Thiệp street, Hồ Tùng Mậu street, and Huỳnh Thúc Kháng street. There was a small roundabout with an Orient clock tower in front of the tower, the clock tower is a gift from Japan government for Saigonese for brand promotion, yet it was demolished as Nguyễn Huệ Boulevard is renovated into a pedestrian square and the intersection was locked for vehicles, it is now replaced as a fountain.

== History ==
=== One of the first church of Saigon ===
According to the Notre-Dame Cathedral Basilica of Saigon website, after occupying Saigon, the French colonialists established a church to serve as a place for celebrating Mass for Catholics. The first church was built on Street No. 5 (now Ngô Đức Kế Street). Bishop Lefebvre decided to build a new church, as that first church was too small.

In 1863, Admiral Victor Auguste Duperré decided to start construction elsewhere on the banks of the "Grand Canal" (also known as the Charner Canal, now the Nguyễn Huệ Boulevard), the site of modern-day Sunwah Tower. Bishop Lefebvre organized the laying of the first stone for the church on March 28, 1863. The wooden church, was completed in 1865 and was initially called the Saigon Church. Later, the church was severely damaged by pests such as termites and woodworms as its wooden interior, services were held in the reception hall of the old Governor's Palace, which was later converted into the Lasan Taberd school (now the Trần Đại Nghĩa High School for the Gifted), until the main church was completed.

=== Justice de Paix ===
The Justice de Paix (Reconciliation Court; Tòa Hòa giải) in 1921. This building was constructed by the French in 1900 after demolishing the old wooden church. Before 1975, the Justice de Paix served as the District 1 Court of Saigon Capital City under the Republic of Vietnam regime. In the large courtyard in front of the Justice de Paix (at the former site of clock tower roundabout), the French colonial authorities established a mobile execution ground to execute prisoners using a guillotine.

=== Sunwah Tower ===
Sunwah Tower in 2000

Sunwah Tower construction was started in 1993 by a joint venture between Sunwah Group and District 1 Import-Export Company with Marubeni, with a total usable area of 20,800 m2.

In 2002, Sunwah Group acquired all the shares from the Vietnamese joint venture, and Sunwah Tower on Nguyễn Huệ Boulevard officially became a building wholly owned by Sunwah Group. In 2018, a subsidiary of Nomura Real Estate Holdings purchased a 24 percent stake from Marubeni.

== Tenants ==
Sunwah Tower in 2008

Some notable office tenants here are: Air China, All Nippon Airways, Emirates, Chubb Limited, Citibank Vietnam, KPMG, Kasikornbank, Japan External Trade Organization, Mizuho Bank, United Overseas Bank, VinaCapital, Mitsubishi Heavy Industries, Lotte Chemical, Marubeni, Nomura Real Estate Vietnam, UNICEF, BIDV Currency Exchange Bureau.

Beside office leasing, the tower also for lease retail area, some notable tenants are: Café Sun Wah (formerly Café Central), Lamy, Techcombank ATM.

Records
Preceded by VTP Office Service Center	Tallest Building in Vietnam; 1995; 92 m	Succeeded by Saigon Centre
Preceded by VTP Office Service Center	Tallest Building in Ho Chi Minh City; 1995; 92 m	Succeeded by Saigon Centre
