= Highlands Coffee =

Vietnamese coffee shop chain

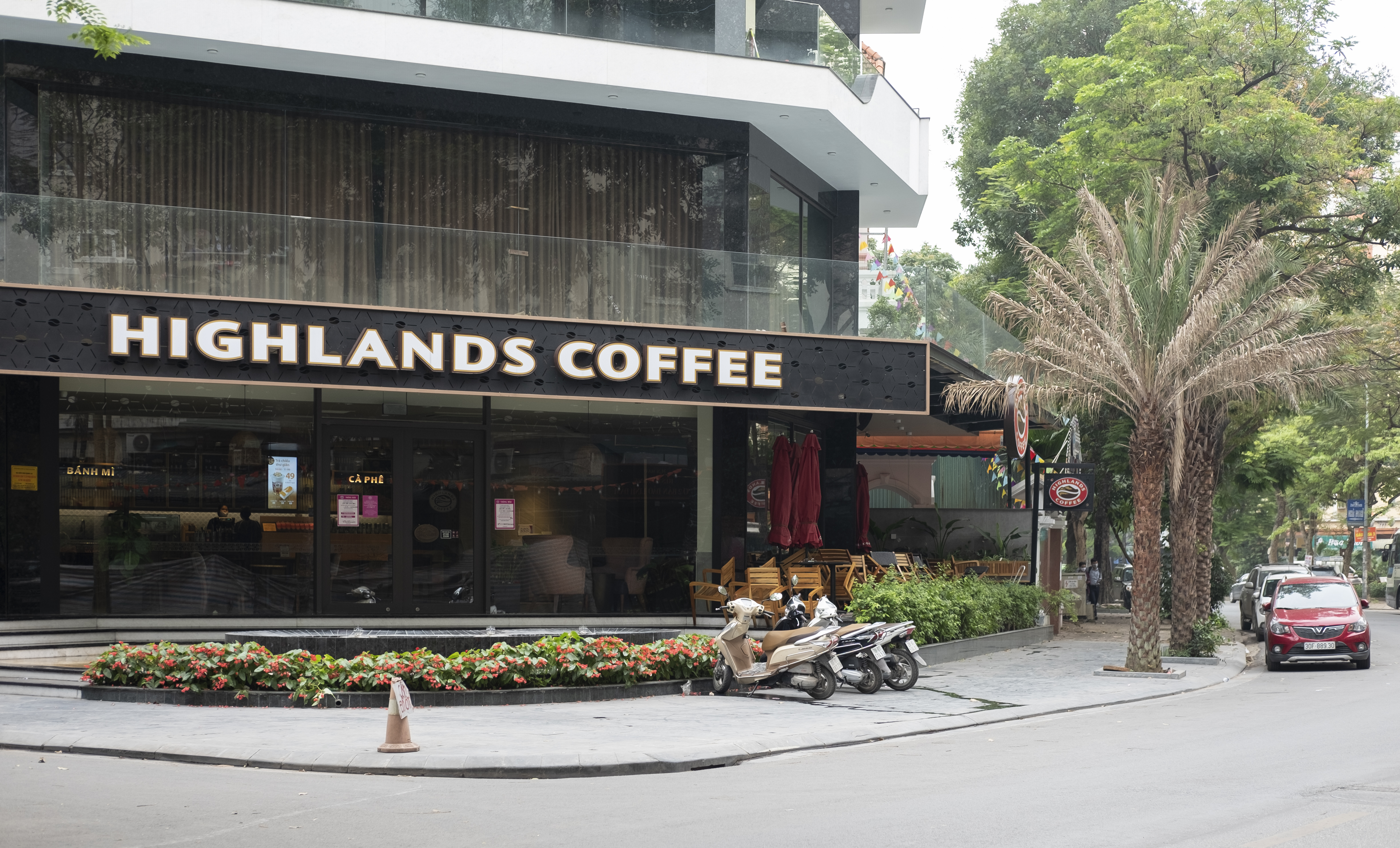
- Highlands Coffee in Linh Đàm, Hanoi
- Product type: Coffee / Coffee shop chain
- Current owner: Superfoods Group (joint venture of Jollibee Group and Viet Thai International Joint Stock Company)
- Country: Vietnam
- Introduced: 1999; 27 years ago
- Website: www.highlandscoffee.com.vn

Highlands Coffee is a Vietnamese coffee shop chain and producer and distributor of coffee products, established in Hanoi by Vietnamese American David Thai in 1999. The establishment of the Highlands Coffee company marked the first time an overseas Vietnamese was able to register a private company within Vietnam. As of 2018, the company operates 230 coffee shops across Vietnam. In 2011, Highlands Coffee purchased the pho chain Phở 24 from Lý Quí Trung for an estimated US$20 million. The next year, Highlands sold 50% of its shares to the Philippine multinational chain Jollibee for US$25 million.

In March 2012, under a partnership with Philippine Internet café company Digital Paradise, the first hybrid Highlands/Netopia Internet café and coffee shop opened in the Philippines.

== History ==
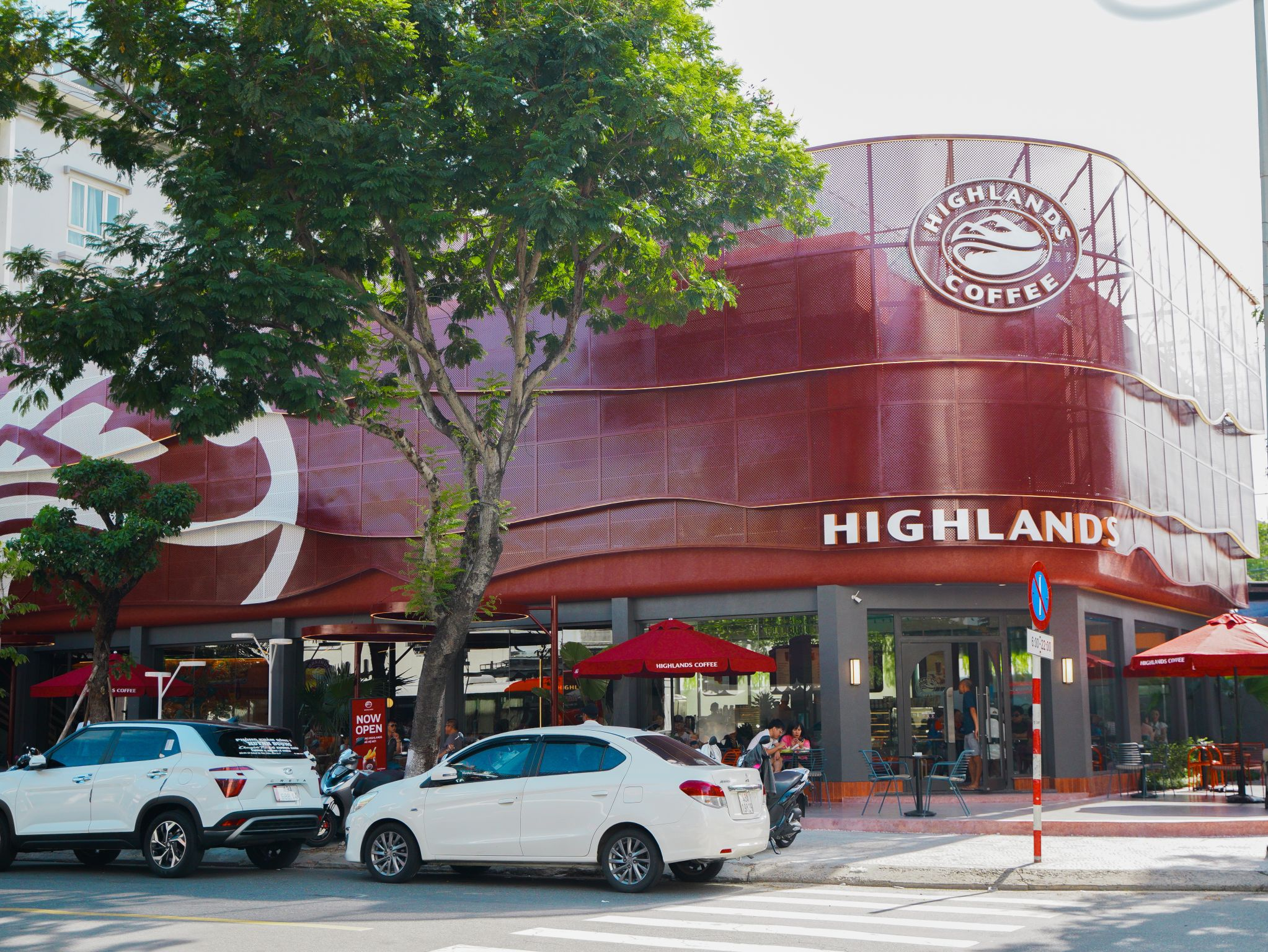
A Highlands Coffee Flagship, Part of the 5G Designs

David Thai, founder of Highlands Coffee, was raised in Seattle (US)—home of the first Starbucks coffee shop. Hence, he witnessed the rise of the Starbucks coffee chain from a small company in his hometown to a multinational corporation. He later cited this as the inspiration behind the founding of Highlands Coffee, which first began operation in Hanoi in 1998. The company's initial registration marked the first time an Overseas Vietnamese person was able to register a private company of any kind in Vietnam. Two years later, in 2000, the company was registered as a joint stock company, again a first for an Overseas Vietnamese.

At the time of its foundation, Highlands limited itself to producing packaged coffee, to be sold through supermarkets, hotels, restaurants, and cafés. It was four years later, in 2002, that the first Highlands Coffee coffee shop was established, across from Notre-Dame Cathedral in Ho Chi Minh City. By 2009, the company operated 80 coffee shops in six cities and provinces across Vietnam: Hanoi, Ho Chi Minh City, Hai Phong, Da Nang, Vũng Tàu and Đồng Nai.

By May 2010, the company offered 5 blended roast and ground and whole bean coffees (Heritage Blend, Traditional Blend, Gourmet Blend, Moka Blend, Culi Supreme), and 4 espressos in ground and whole bean (Full City Roast, Arabica Supreme, a water-process DeCaf espresso produced at their in-house water process decaffeination facility, and Cinnamon Roast espresso). The espresso line also included ESE-compatible 45mm espresso pods packaged in Malaysia. In December 2009 the company introduced a Ready-To-Drink (RTD) "Iced Coffee" in an 8-ounce can, in two versions, one labeled "with Milk" and the other labeled "Black". By May 2010 the company stated that the RTD product had been distributed to more than 17 Asian countries and the USA.

In 2011, Highlands Coffee purchased the pho chain Phở 24 from Lý Quí Trung for an estimated US$20 million. The next year, Highlands sold 50% of its shares to Jollibee Worldwide for US$25 million.

In March 2012, under a partnership with Philippine Internet café company Digital Paradise, the first hybrid Highlands/Netopia internet café and coffee shop was opened in the Philippines.

In December 2022, it was reported that Jollibee was seeking to sell a 10–15% stake in Highlands to an undisclosed investor.

== Organization ==
Highlands Coffee is a registered brand of Viet Thai International Joint Stock Company. Besides ownership of the Highlands Coffee brand, Viet Thai also owns sole franchising rights in Vietnam for several major international brands such as Nike, Aldo Shoes, La Vie en Rose lingerie, and Hard Rock Cafe. The company also operates restaurants and cafeterias in Vietnam, and caters to the local headquarters of Intel Corporation. Executive staff include recruits from such companies as Coca-Cola and Starbucks.

== Brand collaborations ==
Collaboration with Jollibee Foods

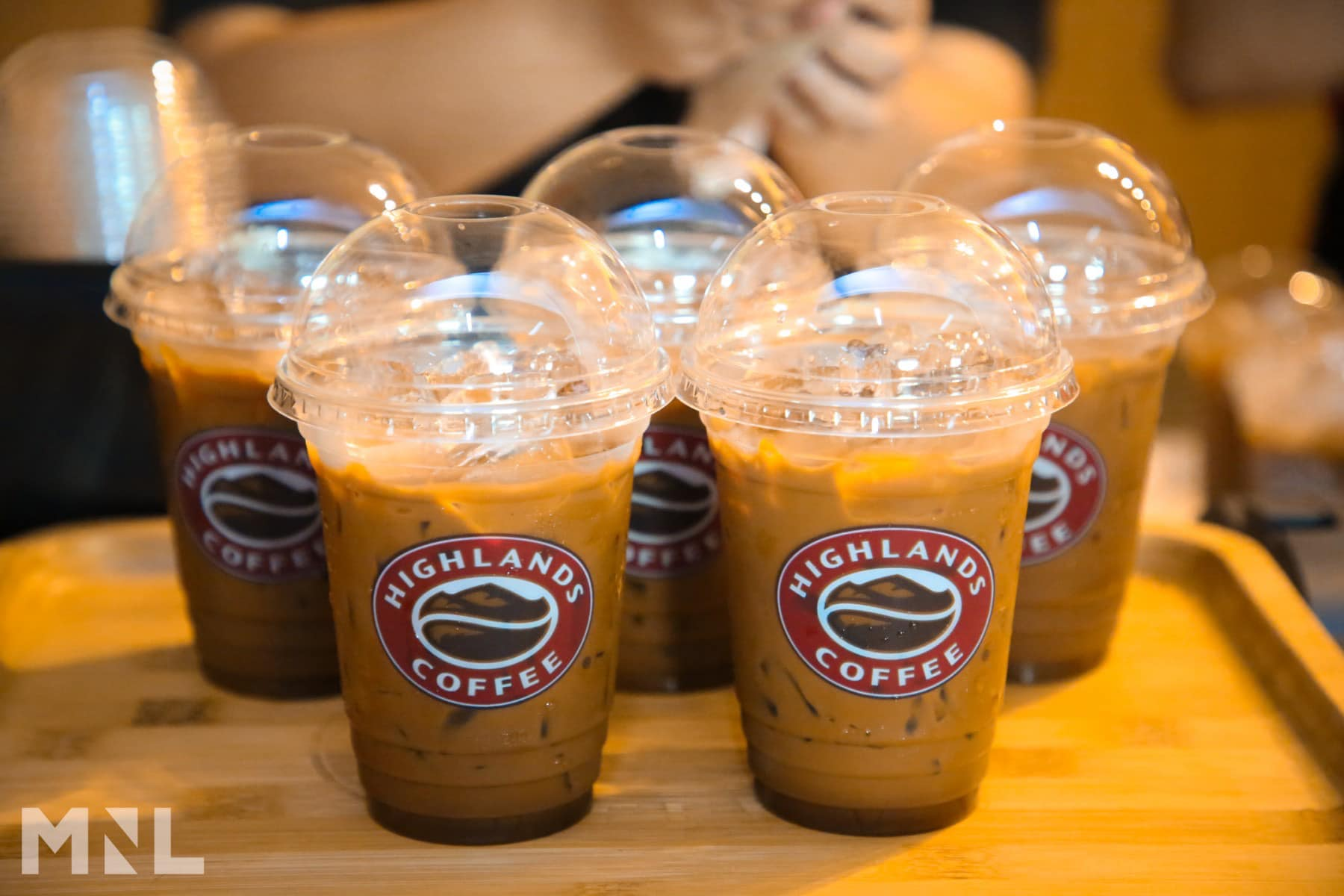
Vietnamese iced coffee from Highlands Coffee in the Philippines

Jollibee owns several of the markets of the fast-food chains in the Philippines. On November 22, 2019, it made its joint venture with the Vietnamese brand Highlands Coffee public.

Jollibee had signed an agreement to make their joint venture firm 'Superfoods Group' to list at the Vietnam Stock Exchange. Superfoods is the owner of Highlands Coffee and other brands, such as Pho 24. In addition to being the fastest-growing joint-ventures of Jollibee, Superfoods has $55 million worth of annual sales. Moreover, with its revenues going 36% for its first nine months of operation, Highlands Coffee is currently basking in the growth rate of 78% from last year.

As per the agreement between Jollibee and Highlands Coffee, Jollibee will be the owner of 60% of the joint venture 'Superfoods', while Highlands Coffee will have the remaining 40%.

IP Ventures and Highlands Coffee

IP Ventures—a private holding company in the Philippines—became the franchisee of Highlands Coffee in 2011.

IP Ventures signed an agreement with the Viet Thai International Joint Stock Company, which owns the Highlands Coffee brand, to officially have the rights to operate the coffee chain in the Philippines.

The agreement was signed in front of the president of Vietnam, Truong Tan Sang, at the Philippine-Vietnam business forum held at the Sofitel Hotel in Manila while he was on a state visit to the Philippines in 2011.

Partnership with The Doughnut People Inc.

The Doughnut People announced their partnership with the Highlands Coffee on July 3, 2013.

The creators of the Go Nuts Donuts brand The Doughnut People Inc. has 26 stores in the Philippines in which they agreed to include the Highlands Coffee signature Vietnamese coffees and their ice blended Classic 'Freeze'; while the Highlands Coffee stocked up on several of the Go Nuts Donuts products in their stores.

== See also ==
- List of coffeehouse chains
