= Operation Attleboro =

1966 battle of the Vietnam War

- Part of the Vietnam War
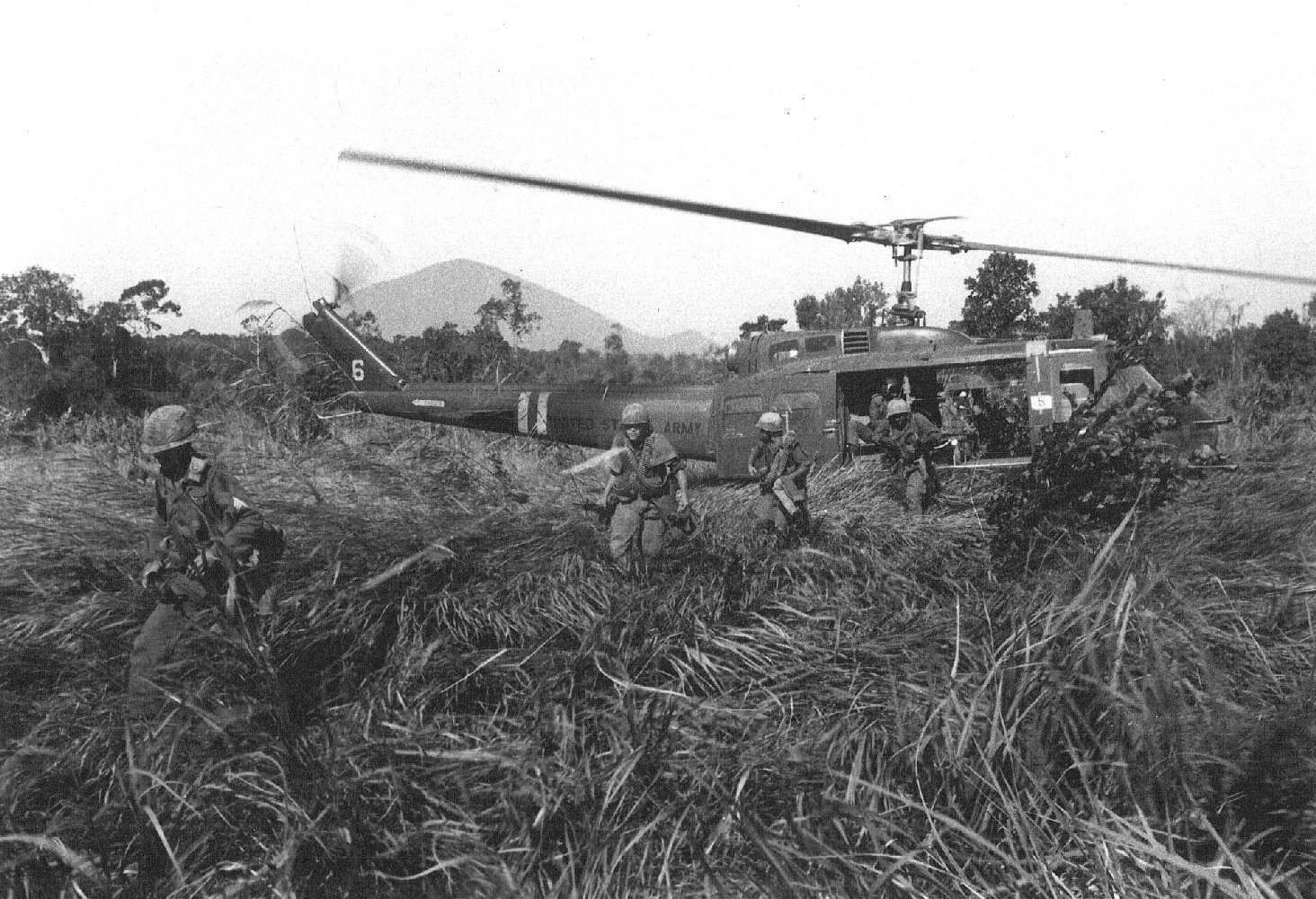
- Infantrymen attacking out of a Huey during Attleboro.
| Date | 14 September – 25 November 1966 |
| Location | Northwest of Dau Tieng, South Vietnam (now in Binh Duong Province, Vietnam) |
| Result | See Aftermath |

Belligerents
| United States; South Vietnam; Philippines | Viet Cong; North Vietnam |

Commanders and leaders
| (United States) Edward H. de Saussure (United States) William E. DePuy | (Vietnam) Hoàng Cầm |

Units involved
| 196th Light Infantry Brigade; 1st Infantry Division; 4th Infantry Division; 25th Infantry Division; PHILCAG | 9th Division (Vietnam) 101st Regiment |

Casualties and losses
| 155 killed 5 missing | 1,016 killed 200+ missing or captured ~127 individual and 19 crew-served weapons recovered |

Operation Attleboro was a Vietnam War search and destroy operation initiated by the 196th Light Infantry Brigade with the objective to discover the location(s) of People's Army of Vietnam (PAVN) and Viet Cong (VC) base areas and force them to fight. The operation was named after Attleboro, Massachusetts, where the brigade had been formed. Operation Attleboro grew to be the largest series of air mobile operations to that time, involving all or elements of the 196th Brigade, 25th Infantry Division, 1st Infantry Division and a brigade of the 4th Infantry Division, as well as numerous Army of the Republic of Vietnam and Regional Forces/Popular Forces and Nùngs. In the end, the operation became a Corps operation commanded by II Field Force, Vietnam.

== Background ==
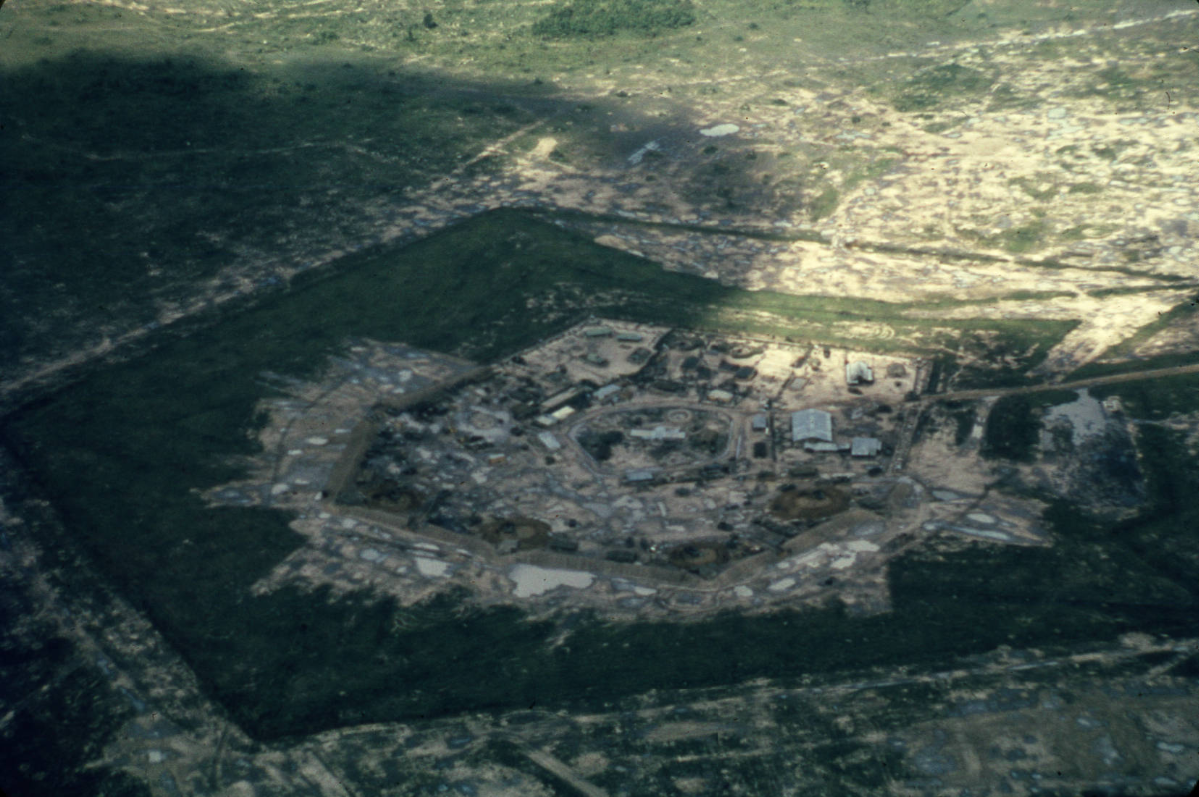
Suoi Da SF camp in April 1967

In late 1966 interdiction remained a high priority for US forces, and, until the dry season began in earnest, COMUSMACV General William Westmoreland's primary concern remained blocking the three infiltration corridors into Saigon.

Senior Colonel Hoàng Cầm, commander of the 9th Division, had his orders: "destroy a 'vital' element of the enemy, support the local [revolutionary] movement, oppose enemy pacification and expansion effort, break the oppressive government control, widen friendly liberated areas, and provide security and protection for storage facilities and base areas of Dung Minh Chau [War Zone C]." This was standard operating procedure for a dry season offensive, but in late 1966 the 9th Division was weakened by heavy losses that the previous summer 's combat had inflicted. Despite this, General Nguyễn Chí Thanh, the COSVN commander, decided to use the 9th, his most reliable and experienced, for a November offensive in Tây Ninh Province. His guidance to Cầm was to direct his "main effort" on the inexperienced 196th Brigade, just settling in at Tây Ninh, and local territorial and Civilian Irregular Defense Group (CIDG) units. Cam planned to open the offensive on 3 November with three regiment-sized attacks. First, he assigned the 271st Regiment, a unit of about 1,500 men, to strike the 196th's base at Tây Ninh Combat Base and attempt to lure and annihilate any of the brigade's reaction forces. His 272nd Regiment with two battalions was to move south across the Saigon River and join the 14th Local Force Battalion, the provincial VC unit for Tây Ninh Province, to attack South Vietnamese territorial outposts at Suoi Cao, thirty kilometers southeast of Tây Ninh City. The remaining battalion of the 272nd was to join the 101st Regiment, a unit of the 7th Division on loan to Cầm, for the third and main effort, the destruction of a Special Forces camp at Suoi Da, 15 km northeast of Tây Ninh City. For this mission Cầm provided to the 101st an antiaircraft and a mortar company from his own division. In all, the reinforced regiment would have about 3,000 troops. Cầm himself intended to accompany the 101st Regiment, a unit that had seen little combat and was unfamiliar with the terrain of War Zone C, to its forward assembly areas near Suoi Da and then to depart to occupy a central position from winch to coordinate all three assaults.

The 196th Light Infantry Brigade, a relatively green unit, along with the Philippine Civic Action Group (PHILCAG) had arrived in South Vietnam less than two months earlier, on 14 August and September 15, 1966 respectively. Both units deployed immediately to Tây Ninh, coming under the operational control of the Major General Frederick C. Weyand's 25th Infantry Division. Shortly afterwards Brigadier General Edward H. de Saussure assumed command of the Brigade. De Saussure was considered by many a superb staff officer and an authority on missiles, but he had no experience commanding infantry. He did have proven ability with artillery units and before joining the 196th had served fifteen months as the assistant division commander for support in the 25th Division, four months of that time in Vietnam.

== Operation ==
The 196th Brigade initiated Operation Attleboro on 14 September 1966 as a series of battalion-size probes around Tây Ninh. While one battalion was in the field the other two remained behind to finish construction of the base camp. These initial sweeps proved unproductive, and by October the unit was looking for a new mission. So, when troops of the 25th Division uncovered a large rice cache in the Saigon River corridor about 30 km southeast of Tây Ninh City, Weyand sent some of de Saussure's forces farther east in search of other stockpiles. On 19 October de Saussure moved one of his battalions to Dầu Tiếng District on the northern edge of the corridor; and had it begin to scour the area, which varied from low, flat terrain and cultivated fields to scrub brush and thick jungle. On 23 October; operating north of the town, the unit stumbled on a long row of sheds covered with black plastic and filled with tons of rice. In the days that followed, the Americans uncovered other large caches. De Saussure asked permission to move his command post to Dầu Tiếng and bring another battalion into the vicinity of the cache site as soon as possible. Brigadier General George G. O'Connor, commanding the 25th Division while Weyand was serving as temporary commander of II Field Force, Vietnam agreed and on 30 October Attleboro became a full-fledged brigade operation.

Evacuation of the rice posed a problem. Located well away from the Saigon River and any road, it had to be lifted out by CH-47 helicopters, then in short supply, and it also had to be bagged beforehand, a time-consuming process for the two infantry battalions. Although 843 tons of rice had so far been uncovered, over the next three days the brigade removed only 120 tons. One of the Brigade units discovered a document from the 82nd Rear Service Group, the COSVN element responsible for supply in War Zone C, that revealed that there were other supply bases to the north and that the VC were in the process of organizing an area defense. Anxious to seize all the depots before the enemy could react in force, on 1 November O'Connor instructed de Saussure to spend only one more day evacuating the rice, to destroy what was left, and then to move north toward the Ba Hao, a stream emptying into the Saigon River 7 km northwest of Dầu Tiếng. In the interim he gave him the 1st Battalion, 27th Infantry Regiment, from his 2nd Brigade, to begin the probe, which it did using "eagle flights." On 2 November the battalion conducted several such flights along the fringe of the objective area and spotted several trails, but found no caches and met no opposition.

=== Ambush 3–5 November ===
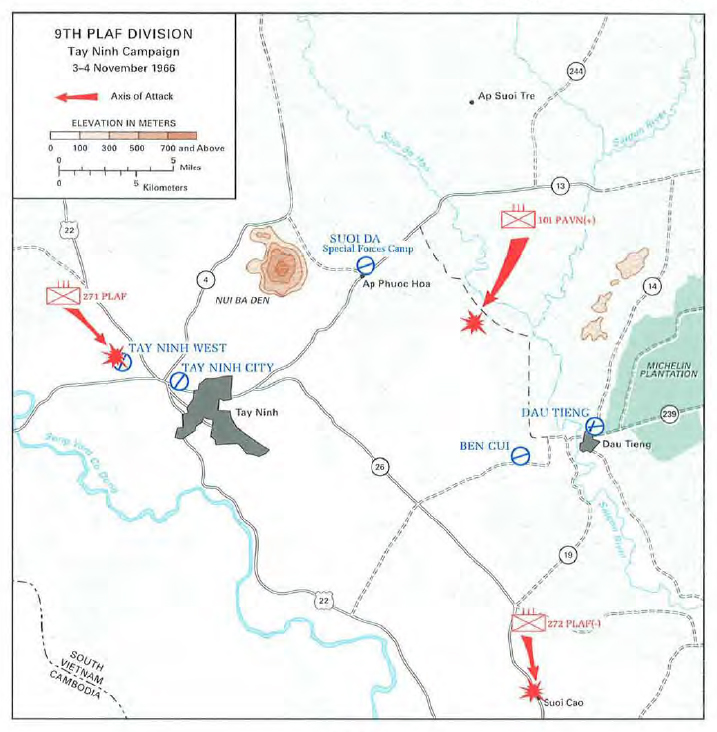
Operation Attleboro 3–4 November 1966

On the morning of 3 November de Saussure sent two of his own battalions, the 2nd Battalion, 1st Infantry Regiment and the 4th Battalion, 31st Infantry Regiment, north from the cache site over four separate jungle routes toward the Ba Hao. At the same time he air-assaulted two companies of the 1/27th Infantry into widely divergent blocking positions just south of the stream, one to the west of the attacking columns, the other to the east. The third company of the 1/27th Infantry remained at Dầu Tiếng, and the 196th's 3rd Battalion, 21st Infantry Regiment, remained at Tây Ninh Base, both serving as reserves. The operation went badly from the start, with no linkup plan, little appreciation of the enemy and terrain, and command and control difficult, the two blocking and four attacking forces quickly became separated from one another, lost in the dense jungle. Shortly before noon a PAVN/VC force of unknown size attacked the western blocking company in tall elephant grass, killing the company commander and inflicting heavy casualties. The arrival of two reserve companies from Dầu Tiếng and Tây Ninh and two companies from the westernmost attacking column failed to turn the tide. Mines, booby traps, and snipers were a constant hazard. Flying overhead, de Saussure spent the rest of the afternoon assisting his battalion commanders as they regrouped their units, evacuated casualties, and brought in extra ammunition, rations, and especially water as the humidity and heat had exhausted the men. Nightfall found the Americans in two laagers. On the west, where the fight had taken place, Major Guy S. Meloy, commander of the 1/27th Infantry who had arrived during the battle, had five companies: his western blocking company, the two reserve companies, and the two companies from the attack column. De Saussure ordered the rest of the committed units, the four remaining attack companies and the eastern blocking company, to assemble and form a perimeter several kilometers to the east. Placing the senior Lieutenant Colonel, Hugh H. Lynch, commanding officer of the 4/31st Infantry, in command, de Saussure began to plan how he would unscramble his units on the following day. Meanwhile, unknown to the Americans, the US foray had caused Colonel Cầm to change his attack plans. Informed of the American movements, Cầm reduced the planned attacks against Tây Ninh Base and Suoi Cao to diversions and scrapped the assault on the Suoi Da Special Forces camp. He would direct his main effort against those elements of the 196th operating northwest of Dầu Tiếng.

On 4 November, the fight intensified all across the battlefront. Cầm's diversionary efforts, a carefully planned mortar attack against de Saussure's Tây Ninh Base to the west and a series of determined assaults against Suoi Cao to the south, were both executed during the early hours, further confusing the Americans. Suoi Cao was saved only by the ineptitude of the attacking 272nd Regiment, heavy US air and artillery fire and a staunch South Vietnamese defense. The PAVN left 53 dead on the battlefield. Tây Ninh was spared a ground attack, but damage to the 196th's communications system was extensive, prompting de Saussure himself to make an emergency trip to his base camp. Northwest of Dầu Tiếng, in the heavy woods near the Ba Hao, Cầm concentrated his main effort. His division had established its forward command post within a fortified stronghold less than 500m northeast of Meloy. Having already rushed the division's security platoon and reconnaissance company to block Meloy's advance, Cầm reinforced with the 3rd Battalion of the 101st Regiment, ordering it across the Ba Hao into prepared positions. His instructions to the battalion were clear: let the Americans enter the woods, then attack.

The two field positions under Meloy and Lynch had remained secure throughout the night except for minor probes of Meloy. After the morning fog lifted the men were resupplied and their commanders given the order of the day: disentangle their units and resume the sweep north. There seemed no rush to get started, since the brigade's mission appeared attainable within a few hours, but the maneuvers that de Saussure and his staff had worked out were no improvement over those of the previous day. Two of the companies that had spent the night with Meloy, those from the 2/1st Infantry, were to trek east about 3 km and resume their original attack north. Meloy was to attack northeast to an arbitrary spot south of the stream on Route 19, an old French logging road, and link up with his eastern blocking company, which would attack west from its night laager with Lynch. To avoid friendly fire problems, Meloy gave the companies of the 2/1st Infantry an hour's head start, then he moved out to the northeast. Lying in wait a short distance away were the PAVN in mutually supporting bunkers, some made of concrete, and all had thick overhead log coverings and bristled with machine-gun emplacements and camouflaged fighting positions. Interconnecting tunnels and trails hidden from the air provided access for rapid reinforcement.

The disciplined PAVN regulars held their fire until the lead US unit walked into a series of concealed fire lanes extending from the bunkers. "One minute it was quiet," Meloy recalled later, "and the next instant it was like a Fort Benning 'Mad Minute."' Returning fire, the Americans tried without success to flank the PAVN. Although Meloy called in artillery, it had no appreciable effect on the volume of hostile fire. Over the next hour he committed his other two companies on either flank, but PAVN fire pinned both to the ground. Unable to advance or withdraw and taking casualties, including everyone in his battalion command group except a radio operator, Meloy radioed for reinforcements. First to respond were the two companies that had left him that morning. Less than a kilometer away, they halted at the sound of gunfire and wheeled north, taking several casualties before reaching Meloy in the afternoon. Meanwhile, the eastern blocking company, led by Captain Robert B. Garrett, advanced from its laager with Lynch and ambushed a PAVN platoon moving to Meloy's front, but for reasons not clear then or later; de Saussure ordered it to turn around and rendezvous with the rest of the Lynch elements well east of the fight. These units would not rejoin the battle until the next morning. Also reinforcing was Company C from Meloy's sister battalion, the 2/27th Infantry. O'Connor had sent the company and battalion headquarters over to Dầu Tiếng the night before, promising de Saussure a second company the next morning and a third on order. Four hours after the firefight started, and after three PAVN human-wave assaults that nearly carried the Meloy position, the company from the 2/27th, accompanied by the battalion commander, Lieutenant Colonel William C. Barott, landed just to the west, soon ran into a PAVN position, and came under fire. Casualties from the first bursts were heavy, including the company commander, who was killed. A half hour later, while trying to find a way to Meloy's perimeter; Barott was also killed. Because of the short distance separating the company from Meloy, it was impossible to bring artillery fire on the PAVN between them, nor could Meloy provide supporting fire for fear of hitting the company's survivors. Twice during the night he tried to relieve them in place and bring them out, attacking through apparent gaps in the PAVN lines. The first attack ran into a line of bunkers and was repulsed, sustaining five dead and eight wounded. The second attack, toward dawn, triggered a big firefight and also failed to break through with 7 Americans killed.

Meanwhile, throughout the fourth de Saussure's superiors had continually monitored the battle, becoming increasingly unhappy with his performance. Early in the day, while de Saussure was back at Tây Ninh Base surveying the damage from the mortar attack, Major General William E. DePuy, the 1st Infantry Division commander, and one of his assistant commanders, Brigadier General James F. Hollingsworth, arrived at the command post at Dầu Tiếng. Upon learning of the Brigade's complicated plan for the day and the reported locations of its scattered units, DePuy sensed a disaster in the making. Even more shocking was the absence of the Brigade commander at what DePuy considered a critical time. He ordered de Saussure to return to Dầu Tiếng at once. When de Saussure arrived he briefed the visiting generals using his personal map. The locations of his units as he plotted them were different from those of his staff, and DePuy felt the maneuver plan was illogical and confusing. Convinced that de Saussure might lose control of the situation, DePuy offered some pointed advice and then left with Hollingsworth. In the afternoon Lieutenant General John A. Heintges, the MACV deputy commander, also landed at de Saussure's command post for a briefing. He too disliked what he saw, and from his helicopter he asked Weyand to meet him at Bien Hoa Air Base. There, Heintges urged Weyand to have DePuy take over the operation, since the 1st Division had more experience fighting the large main force units that the 196th had apparently run up against; Weyand agreed.

That evening planes started landing at Dầu Tiếng with a battalion of the 1st Division, followed by DePuy and his headquarters. DePuy immediately placed his 3rd Brigade command post at Suoi Da and ordered his supporting artillery and cavalry to move by road throughout the night to join the brigade, which he intended to commit to battle on the fifth. Turning to the 196th, he told de Saussure to break contact the next day, assemble all his units in a clearing south of Meloy, and unscramble the companies and return each to its parent organization. In the meantime, he put Meloy, who had been cool under fire, in charge of the battle. Meloy had his work cut out for him: a tattered company to rescue and a fighting withdrawal to effect, it took him most of 5 November. The rest of the 2/27th Infantry, which airassaulted piecemeal into his perimeter, and three companies that had spent the night with Colonel Lynch, with Garrett in the lead. Those three companies brought to eleven the number under Meloy's command, but it was Garrett who made the breakthrough. By noon, after coordinating with Meloy and the artillery, Garrett attacked south and finally reached the trapped company, which had just repelled a determined PAVN assault. Four hour later Garrett and the Barott survivors found Meloy and relative safety after circling well to the west around the PAVN bunkers. Then came disengagement, another two hours, with Meloy breaking contact company by company, leapfrogging them to the rear under covering artillery, and then extraction by helicopter to bases at Dầu Tiếng and Tây Ninh. Captain Robert F. Foley commander of Company A, 2/27th Infantry Regiment and Private First Class John F. Baker Jr. of the same unit would each be awarded the Medal of Honor for their actions on 5 November.

The next day, 6 November, the 101st Regiment having pulled out, elements of the 196th returned to the battlefield to retrieve the remaining dead. The three-day engagement was at best a standoff, although the PAVN apparently had been hurt the most, suffering upwards of 200 dead. Only later would the Americans learn the full extent of the damage they had done. According to the 9th Division after action report, one of the companies from the 3rd Battalion, 101st Regiment, had been mauled on the fifth and had fled without orders. The other survivors of the battalion took six days to reassemble north of the Ba Hao, and for the remainder of the operation the 3rd Battalion never regained its fighting effectiveness. American losses were also heavy, while the PAVN claimed 600 Americans killed, actual losses were 60 dead and 159 wounded, most of them in the two battalions of the 27th Infantry. The 25th Division had paid the price for de Saussure's mistakes. The three-day battle marked the first time in III Corps that the PAVN had sustained prolonged combat with a large US force. It proved to be a harbinger of battles to come, as Colonel Cầm ordered all three of his regiments to pull back into War Zone C to continue the fight.

=== Search and destroy 6–25 November ===
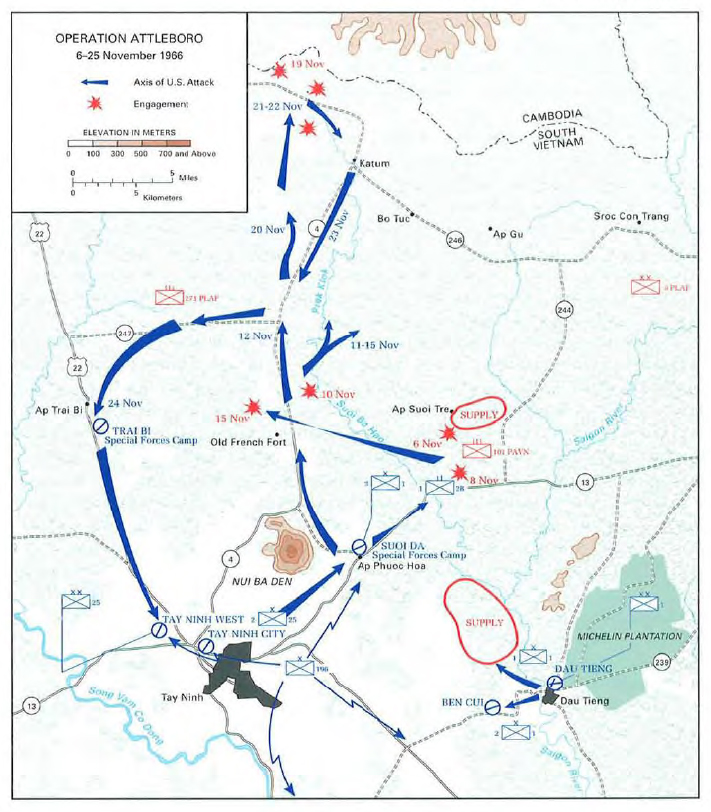
Operation Attleboro 6–25 November 1966

From 6 to 25 November the operation became a large-scale search and destroy operation as II Field Force threw battalion after battalion into the jungle northwest of Saigon. When DePuy took control of the operation on 4 November, he had only his 1st Division command post and a battalion, which he airlifted to Dầu Tiếng from his Dĩ An Base Camp base camp that night. Over the next two days two of his brigades, the 2nd and 3rd, joined him on the battlefield in rapid succession. Both flew to Dầu Tiếng, but the 3rd moved forward to Suoi Da. While DePuy made certain of his supply lines, both brigades started after the 9th Division early on the sixth. Rather than conduct a multi-unit sweep that would take time to develop and would allow the 9th Division to slip into Cambodia, DePuy decided to insert his forces quickly at a point close to the suspected enemy bases in hopes of generating a hasty and unplanned response. Only as a last resort would he "jungle bash" as de Saussure had, using large units on long, often fruitless, but sometimes costly, searches for the enemy. Since taking command of the 1st Division in March, DePuy had concluded that the trick to jungle fighting was to find the enemy with the fewest possible men and destroy him with the maximum amount of firepower. So far, most operations in Vietnam had consisted of hundreds of hours of patrolling punctuated by a few minutes of intense, close-quarters combat, which, more often than not, the VC had initiated. Experiences during the summer of 1966, most notably the War Zone C battles at Srok Dong and the Minh Thanh Road, in which 1st Division forces had destroyed enemy ambushes with storms of fire, had confirmed for DePuy the wisdom of this approach. To find the enemy during Attleboro, DePuy intended to have his troops sweep forward in a series of methodical tactical maneuvers called cloverleafing, employed when enemy contact appeared imminent. Typically, the unit would move forward on an assigned azimuth and then stop to set up an "overwatch" position, whereupon one squad would advance 50-100m, depending on the density of the jungle, while another squad moved a like distance to one flank. The trace of each route taken would be an arc resembling a cloverleaf. If the patrols made no contact they returned, and the unit moved forward to establish a second overwatch position and repeat the process, with the check to the flank made in the opposite direction. Although time-consuming, the maneuver allowed an infantry unit to search an area thoroughly while at the same time reducing its vulnerability to ambush.

Upon locating the enemy, DePuy planned to destroy him in a deluge of firepower. In addition to the artillery in the divisions, Attleboro was supported by the rapidly growing resources of II Field Force, two new battalions and an artillery group had arrived in October, plus a large arsenal of bombers and fighter-bombers from Bien Hoa and Phan Rang Air Base. United States Air Force (USAF) personnel were integrated into every aspect of the operation, beginning with the 3rd Direct Air Support Center at Bien Hoa, which coordinated aerial operations over the III Corps area. At the division level, both the 1st and 25th had a division air liaison officer, while each brigade had a USAF control party consisting of a brigade air liaison officer, his assistant, and three forward air controllers flying the venerable O-1 Bird Dog. As the operation escalated into a showdown with the 9th Division, the USAF tactical role would climb sharply.

Early on the sixth, believing time was of the essence, DePuy launched his offensive. One battalion helicoptered to the area that the 196th Brigade had just vacated, while two more landed 10 km farther north. There, a Special Forces mobile strike force battalion of Nùngs had bumped into the 101st Regiment and had been roughly handled. From then on, a heavy barrage would precede each air assault. Although two of DePuy's battalions made early contact with the enemy, the shelling apparently prevented interference with the landings. As night approached, all three US units reported firm contact, although no decisive engagement developed. Just before dark a seven-man ambush patrol from the 3rd Brigade observed 150 VC, armed with carbines and carrying packs, slipping south along a trail toward Route 13. The patrol quickly called for artillery and mortar fire against the entire length of the VC column. As the rear element passed the patrol's position, the Americans set off a Claymore Mine, firing a wall of lethal pellets into the column. Moments later artillery hit the rest of the column. The following morning patrols found 70 VC bodies on the trail. Throughout the night of 6 November artillery and fighter-bombers pounded suspected enemy locations around the perimeters of the three battalions. Moving out soon after daybreak, each unit found a number of shattered fortifications and counted an additional 100 PAVN/VC dead. US losses during the opening day of combat totaled one killed and 23 wounded, compared to 170 PAVN/VC.

Convinced that the 1st Division had fixed the PAVN 9th Division, Weyand turned Attleboro into a field force operation. On the seventh he instructed O'Connor still acting in his stead as commander of the 25th Division, to deploy the 2nd Brigade headquarters and a battalion to Tây Ninh Base, to establish a forward command post for the 25th Division. That accomplished, Weyand returned to O'Connor the three battalions of the 25th under control of the 1st Division so O'Connor's 2nd Brigade, now reconstituted, could sweep north with the 1st Division, using Route 4 as an axis of advance. Weyand wanted O'Connor to complete the realignment as soon as possible. Meanwhile, DePuy sent two additional battalions into the region northeast of Suoi Da, but neither those nor the three already committed were able to regain contact with the PAVN/VC.

That evening, as the easternmost battalion, the 1st Battalion, 28th Infantry Regiment, commanded by Lieutenant Colonel Jack G. Whitted, bivouacked in a savanna grass clearing, word came that the unit would be extracted by helicopter the next morning for commitment elsewhere. Early in the morning of 8 November the battalion's listening posts reported movement to their front. Just before first light, Whitted pulled in the outposts and told all his companies to conduct a reconnaissance by fire with mortars and small arms. As the firing moved around the northern edge of the perimeter, two trip flares ignited, and hidden enemy troops opened fire. Twenty minutes later a company from the 101st Regiment launched a frontal attack against Whitted's northern defenses. Because the battalion's Claymore Mines, laid in two concentric circles outside the perimeter, were still in place, the attack was doomed to failure. By detonating the outer bank of Claymores the defenders broke the assault, and the PAVN fell back. Whitted requested air strikes and artillery fire, but the battery supporting his unit had started to displace. For twenty minutes the howitzers were silent, forcing Whitted to rely on his mortars. When the PAVN attempted a second assault, the howitzers were ready to fire. Storming in again from the northwest, that attack broke down when the defenders fired their inner bank of Claymores, and the artillery began dropping shells a long the northwest edge of Whitted's position. When the requested air support arrived overhead, Whitted shifted the artillery to the west and southwest so the fighter-bombers could begin their runs. Despite heavy losses, the 101st sent a second battalion into the fight at sunrise. Committing its units piecemeal at five-minute intervals, that battalion hurled its men against Whitted's west and southwest flanks. To use the PAVN's own description of what happened, the attackers "missed a chance to destroy the enemy in the pocket of resistance because of lack of determination." While daylight made it easier for the fighter-bombers to find their targets, it also revealed the location of Whitted's men, particularly his company commanders close by their radio antennas. All three were soon hit, but Whitted, although bleeding from a wound himself, arranged to replace them. One radio operator, PFC Robert "Bo" Nelson of Longview, Texas, distinguished himself during the attack. According to his Bronze Star with "V" Device award citation, PFC Nelson "maintained flawless communications with the other friendly elements. Several times he reported his personal observations, which immensely aided his commanding officer in his direction of the battle. When he was not operating his radio, Private First Class Nelson directed his own deadly rifle fire on the insurgent positions. [On] one occasion a comrade was wounded by the hostile fire. With no regard for his personal safety, Private First Class Nelson moved through the vicious Viet Cong Fire to administer first aid and extract the injured man." At a climactic moment in the fight, one of the company commander replacements, Captain Eurípides Rubio, realized that a smoke grenade intended to mark the PAVN's position for an incoming air strike had landed perilously close to his own men. As he ran forward to scoop up the grenade and throw it into the PAVN ranks, he made a ready target and was quickly wounded. Undaunted, he continued forward until he had worked to within 20m of the PAVN. As he threw the grenade, PAVN fire cut him down, Rubio was later posthumously awarded the Medal of Honor. The air strike that Rubio had marked and others that followed hit the PAVN force regrouping for another attack. Whitted had by that time reinforced the threatened sector with the last of his reconnaissance platoon, which he had maintained as a reserve, and the men were able to hold without further help. The PAVN soon began to disengage his shattered units, and at 11:30, as the Americans downed the last of a number of snipers hidden in trees to cover the retreat, the action came to an end. Although DePuy tried to cut off escape routes, using the 3rd Brigade under Colonel Sidney Marks, the PAVN made good their withdrawal. PAVN historians later claimed that "one [US] company was completely destroyed [and] another . .. suffered heavy losses (over two hundred men)." The PAVN had actually killed 19 Americans. PAVN dead totaled 305; the next day another 85 bodies would be found stuffed in a tunnel. The subsequent discovery, just north of Whitted, of a huge supply complex containing tons of grenades, explosives, mines, food and clothing, made clear why the 101st had attacked.

After Whitted's fight on the 8th, DePuy was certain that the enemy force northeast of Suoi Da was still large and threatening, so he sought to have his 1st Brigade join him and Weyand agreed. DePuy could have asked to keep the 196th, but since his meeting with de Saussure on the fourth, he had lost confidence in that brigade, so had Westmoreland. After examining de Saussure's performance from 3 to 5 November, Westmoreland concluded that the 196th needed fresh leadership. De Saussure, Westmoreland noted, had committed his units piecemeal and had lost control of parts of his command in the brigade's first significant action, albeit a "rough one." "Perhaps no one under the circumstances," Westmoreland wrote later, "could have done better," and Westmoreland blamed himself for giving command of an infantry brigade to an officer "lacking in tactical infantry experience." So DePuy got his 1st Brigade, not the 196th. Yet, until he could gain a clearer picture of the 9th Division's whereabouts, he felt compelled to reserve judgment on his dispositions. Accordingly, when the 1st Brigade arrived, he gave its commander, Colonel Sidney Berry, the mission to guard the division's forward base at Dầu Tiếng and to replace the 196th. By the morning of the 10th DePuy had under his immediate command eight of the 1st Division's nine battalions, while the remaining battalion and a task force composed of rear-service units protected the division's bases nearer Saigon.

Marks' 3rd Brigade continued to find hastily abandoned camps and ammunition stores but failed, as did the 2nd Brigade, to regain contact with the 101st Regiment. On the 11th, therefore, DePuy shifted the 2nd Brigade under Lieutenant Colonel Sam S. Walker to search for a "700-man Viet Cong force" reported near the Bến Củi Plantation. Finding no trace of the unit, Walker went on to conduct a cordon and search operation at Bến Củi II, a hamlet inside the plantation, which agents had reported as a major VC supply point. Operations of that sort, which would be used again and again throughout the war, had three objectives: first, to gather intelligence and root out the VC underground; second, to help the Saigon government show concern for the welfare of the people; and third, to search a populated area for weapons and other items of military value. Late on the evening of the 12th Walker's men encircled Ben Cui II, completing the seal just before daylight. South Vietnamese officials followed, assembling the inhabitants for questioning by a South Vietnamese National Police team. Most were elderly people or children. After the police segregated all men between the ages of fifteen and forty-five for further interrogation, government officials organized a hamlet festival. The officials made speeches about the need for the people to support the Saigon government, distributed safe-conduct passes and how-to-surrender leaflets, provided a meal, and generally attempted to befriend the people of the hamlet. Meanwhile, a US Medical Civic Action Program (MEDCAP) team consisting of a doctor and medical assistants treated 190 villagers who had minor illnesses. All the while, the 2nd Brigade searched the hamlet. Although the troops found few weapons and military stores, the joint US-South Vietnamese effort resulted in the capture of twenty-seven VC and the discovery that Bến Củi II was a requisition processing point for COSVN's 82d Rear Service Group. VC units would send carrying parties to the hamlet with money for the inhabitants to purchase food and supplies in Dầu Tiếng and Tây Ninh City. The villagers in turn brought the requested commodities to the waiting VC, who used them to replenish their jungle depots. Yet the 1st Brigade, not the 2nd, would reap the benefit of that information. Soon after moving into the region, Berry's men found six caches, which contained over 1,300 tons of rice.

As the 1st Division continued its search for the 9th Division, Weyand brought the 25th Division into the operation. He instructed O'Connor to enter War Zone C on the 1st Division's west flank but not to proceed beyond the 80 east-west grid line, 30 km north of Tây Ninh City. Weyand wanted that area searched carefully before risking a more daring sweep farther north. The 2nd Brigade of the 25th Division established a firebase on 10 November at Bau Co, an old French fort located on Route 4, 10 km north of Nui Ba Den, the dominant hill mass overlooking War Zone C. The brigade then deployed its forces to the northeast, where intelligence had traced the 271st Regiment. To conserve helicopters for resupply missions, O'Connor ordered the 196th Brigade, upon return to his control on the twelfth, to open the ground route between Tây Ninh and Bau Co. Meanwhile, Colonel Cầm was rapidly losing control of his fighting force. He had instructed his 101st Regiment to protect the 82nd Rear Service Group's ammunition stores and to fight a delaying action; but the 101st, battling Whitted at Suoi Da on unfamiliar ground, was in full retreat by the afternoon of the 8th. Retreat turned into panic when the rear service troops joined the fleeing regiment rather than facing American firepower alone. When the 9th Division ordered supplies for its maneuver units, nobody was left to deliver them. Cầm sought to regain the initiative, ordering two regiments, the 271st and 272nd, to attack Attleboro's two main supply bases. In response, the 271st sent two units toward Tây Ninh Base. During the night of the 11th, one force fired seventy mortar rounds into the camp of the 196th, killing three Americans and wounding thirty-two. The other force shelled a Special Forces camp at Trang Sup, 4 km to the north, and overran a territorial outpost. That same night, a contingent of the 272nd fired seventy mortar rounds into the 1st Division's forward base at Dầu Tiếng, wounding 14 Americans.

As the 9th Division struggled to influence the battle, Westmoreland met with Weyand on 14 November. Pleased with the performance of the 1st Division, Westmoreland felt that DePuy should continue searching west of the Saigon River for another week but told Weyand that he should begin planning to return the division to its original operational area north of Saigon. Once the division had left, Westmoreland said, he intended to station the 3rd Brigade, 4th Infantry Division, newly arrived in Vietnam in October, at Dầu Tiếng under the control of the 25th. Turning to the 25th Division, Westmoreland suggested that it make a rapid thrust north with its 2nd Brigade a long Route 4 toward the Cambodian border in an attempt to spark an enemy reaction. As an objective, Westmoreland had in mind COSVN headquarters, reported to be situated near Katum. If COSVN remained elusive, the 2nd Brigade could turn west and drive toward Lo Go, a border village 35 km northwest of Tây Ninh City that seemed to be a major supply base for War Zone C. In so doing the brigade would pass through a region where electronic intelligence reports had located various sections of COSVN headquarters. If the move to Lo Go came up empty, Weyand was to end Attleboro and wait for new intelligence before reinitiating operations in War Zone C.

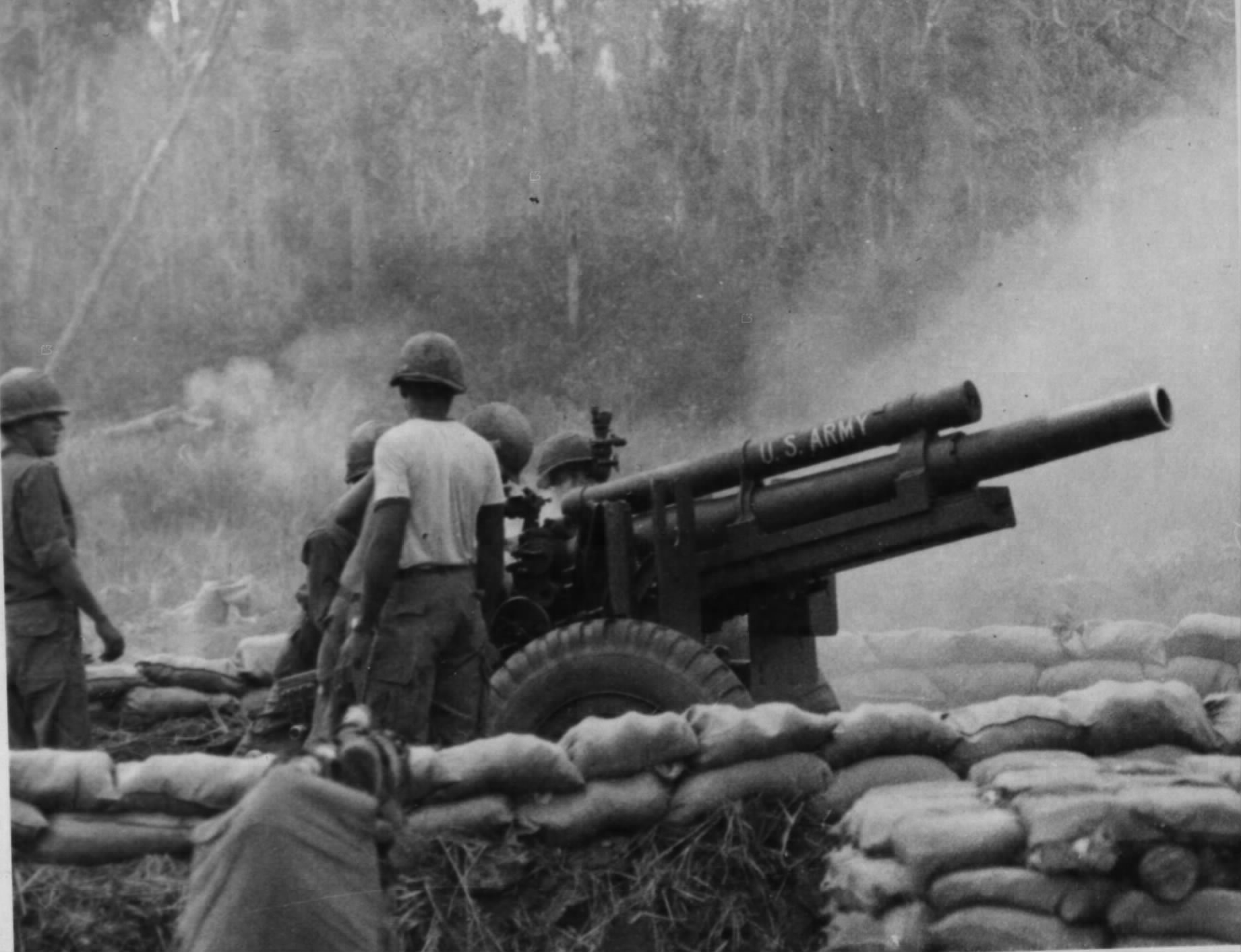
A gun crew of Battery A, 2nd Battalion, 33rd Artillery, fire a 105mm howitzer in support of the 1st Battalion, 18th Infantry, 18 November 1966

While the two commanders discussed the last phase of Attleboro, the 2nd Brigade of the 25th was searching for the 271st Regiment east of Route 4 and north of the French fort. When the change of orders from II Field Force arrived on the 14th, O'Connor instructed the brigade's commander, Colonel Thomas M. Tarpley, to terminate that operation and move north to find COSVN. The following day, 15 November, Tarpley's brigade began its advance, spearheaded by two mechanized battalions. Within a day it had established a firebase 8 km north of its starting point and had pushed reconnaissance elements north and west. Tarpley relocated his command post to the newly established firebase, but his units found few signs of the enemy until the 19th. That morning one of the mechanized companies came upon an entrenched VC platoon northwest of Katum. The company's M113 armored personnel carriers overran the position with little difficulty, killing 11 VC. Most of the VC unit involved, a battalion from the 70th Guard Regiment, stayed hidden nearby, apparently unwilling to risk a fight against armor. Later that day a second mechanized company bumped into another entrenched enemy force, an antiaircraft company attached to COSVN, armed with 12.7mm machine guns. That unit, and a second from the 271st that arrived posthaste, held the Americans at bay for several hours, despite heavy US air and artillery support. They withdrew after dark, having killed one and wounded twenty-three of Tarpley's troops. Analyzing what had happened, PAVN/VC commanders concluded: "We lacked coordination between the 1st Battalion, 271st Regiment and the anti-aircraft unit, and the 2nd Battalion, 271st Regiment did not join in the battle. If we had coordinated, the killed enemy would have been more and more numerous." Documents taken from PAVN/VC dead after the fights and information from a prisoner confirmed the presence of a major enemy force, possibly a full regiment. With that in mind, Tarpley brought all of his battalions forward but failed to make further contact. Even so, the PAVN/VC remained nearby, for on the night of 21 November 40 mortar rounds fell on the 2nd Brigade's command post, wounding one soldier. On the 22nd Tarpley closed down his firebases and began conducting feints to the east and northwest of Katum to cover the withdrawal. His last unit reached Tây Ninh on the 25th, the final day of the operation.

In the meantime, having assumed the 25th Division's original mission to search the woods northwest of the French fort, DePuy's 1st Division had stirred up a fight. On 15 November, following an intensive bombardment, Marks' 3rd Brigade moved a battalion by air into the southeastern corner of the woods. Once that battalion was safely inside, Marks ordered a second battalion into a smaller clearing 4 km to the northwest. Landing in groups of five helicopters at a time, the men began to secure the clearing. As helicopters of the third lift deposited their loads, took off from the site, and turned south over the trees, they flew into a hail of enemy bullets. Three UH-1 Hueys went down, their crews subsequently rescued. The rest of the battalion skirted the danger zone and continued to land. Having encountered a major enemy unit, Marks ordered both battalions to execute cloverleaf patrols into the jungle. Once they made contact with the enemy, he called for all available firepower. The airstrikes blew away a portion of the overgrowth, revealing a large enemy base camp. Sporadic firing continued throughout the night. The next morning, reinforced by a third battalion, Marks' men entered the base camp. There they found a number of enemy bodies, shattered emplacements, and at one location a small camp still occupied by VC. Rather than assault the fortified position, Marks pulled his men back and again called for heavy fire support. The fight was still in progress when DePuy received an electronic intelligence report locating the 273rd Regiment a few kilometers northwest of Marks' battalions. Although the PAVN unit was actually the 101st, the specific identification made little difference. When Marks reported that the PAVN facing him was trying to withdraw in that direction, DePuy requested B-52s. Since it would take twenty hours to bring in the bombers, DePuy sought to pin the PAVN in place with artillery and airstrikes. Between bomb and shell bursts that continued throughout the night, Colonel Marks' men could hear PAVN movement within the strike zone, then came the B-52s, and all was quiet. When patrols reached the target area, they found only a few bodies and several collapsed bunkers; the bulk of the PAVN had escaped. The next day the men discovered a large but vacated hospital complex nearby containing over thirty structures. The largest building, 120 feet (37 m) long, was a combination training center and mess hall with a stage and seating for 150 men. After examining several medical booklets and reports, intelligence analysts concluded that the 3rd Brigade had found the VC medical center for War Zone C.

== US forces involved ==
Source
| Phase I (14 September to 31 October) | Phase II (31 October to 5 November) | Phase III (5-10 November) | Phase IV (10-25 November) | Support Units |
|---|---|---|---|---|
| 196th Infantry Brigade (Light) (Separate): 2nd Battalion, 1st Infantry; 3rd Battalion, 21st Infantry; 4th Battalion, 31st Infantry; 3rd Battalion, 82nd Artillery; B Battery/3rd Battalion 13th Artillery | 196th Infantry Brigade (Light) (Separate): 2nd Battalion, 1st Infantry; 3rd Battalion, 21st Infantry; 4th Battalion, 31st Infantry; 1st Battalion, 27th Infantry; 3rd Battalion, 82nd Artillery; A Battery/1st Battalion, 8th Artillery (Attached 4 November); C Battery/3rd Battalion, 13th Artillery (General Support, reinforcing 2 November); Platoon/B Battery, 3rd Battalion, 13th Artillery (Attached 3 November) | 196th Infantry Brigade Task Force (attached to 1st Infantry Division): 2nd Battalion, 1st Infantry; 3rd Battalion, 21st Infantry; 4th Battalion, 31st Infantry (attached to 1st Battalion (Mechanized), 5th Infantry 8–10 November); 1st Battalion, 27th Infantry (attached to 1st Infantry Division 5–11 November); 1st Battalion (Mechanized), 5th Infantry (attached to 1st Infantry Division 6–10 November) | 2nd Brigade Task Force: 1st Battalion (Mechanized), 5th Infantry (10 November); 1st Battalion, 27th Infantry; 2nd Battalion, 27th Infantry (11 November); 2nd Battalion, 14th Infantry; 2nd Battalion, 22nd Infantry (13 November); 1st Battalion, 8th Artillery; 196th Infantry Brigade Task Force: 2nd Battalion, 1st Infantry; 3rd Battalion, 21st Infantry; 4th Battalion, 31st Infantry; 3rd Battalion, 82nd Artillery | 25th Aviation Battalion 11th Aviation Battalion 13th Aviation Battalion: 175th Aviation Company; 52nd Aviation Battalion: 117th Aviation Company; 145th Aviation Battalion: 68th Aviation Company; 71st Aviation Company; 118th Aviation Company |

== Aftermath ==
US intelligence later estimated PAVN/VC losses as 1,016 killed. The PAVN admitted losing half that number, while an unconfirmed agent report indicated that PAVN/VC losses were twice as much as the final American count. Allied losses totaled 155 killed and 494 wounded. Other estimates put the figure at 500 PAVN/VC killed, and roughly 127 guns and 19 crew-guns recovered The PAVN claim to have "killed thousands of enemy troops" during the operation.

US military spokesmen claimed that the most significant result of Operation Attleboro was the severe blow struck against the PAVN/VC supply system, however, the operation failed to eradicate VC political domination in Tay Ninh Province, as they quietly returned to the area from their sanctuaries in Cambodia just after the American withdrawal.

General DePuy saw Attleboro as a serious setback for the PAVN/VC. He believed that the 9th Division 's 272d Regiment was rendered ineffective and that the 101st and 273rd Regiments were "badly hurt." However, captured documents later revealed that only the 101st had taken heavy losses, while the 271st and 272nd had suffered moderate casualties and the 273rd had escaped unscathed.

Operation Attleboro was the first field test of the U.S. Army's new search and destroy doctrine and set a pattern that would be later exhibited other large operations including Cedar Falls and Junction City. These operations began with massive B-52 Arc Light bombing strikes followed by helicopter and ground sweeps that usually made sporadic contact with PAVN/VC forces. Americans often uncovered evidence of hasty departure (i.e. abandoned camps, vacated tunnels, caches of food and supplies) indicating that the PAVN/VC forces had been alerted by the preparations for upcoming search-and-destroy missions. However, trying to "comb" the jungles with rifles, as de Saussure had attempted, was just too expensive.

== Contemporary reporting ==
- "Attleboro battered Reds' supply system". Stars and Stripes. 28 November 1966. ISSN 0894-8542. OCLC 8777119. Archived from the original on 10 August 2022.
- "The Giant Spoiler". Time. 18 November 1966. ISSN 0040-781X. OCLC 1311479. Archived from the original on 30 September 2007.
- "Disappearing Act". Time. 25 November 1966. ISSN 0040-781X. OCLC 1311479. Archived from the original on 20 February 2008.
- "Encouraging Returns". Time. 9 December 1966. ISSN 0040-781X. OCLC 1311479. Archived from the original on 30 September 2007.
