= Tây Nam =

Tây Nam Phường Tây Nam An Tây
- Ward
- Interactive map of Tây Nam
- Coordinates: 11°05′56″N 106°32′45″E
- Country: Vietnam
- Municipality: Ho Chi Minh City
- Established: June 16, 2025

Area
  - Total: 46.26 sq mi (119.80 km^{2})

Population (2024)
  - Total: 56,784
  - Density: 1,227.6/sq mi (473.99/km^{2})
- Time zone: UTC+07:00 (Indochina Time)
- Administrative code: 25843

Tây Nam (Vietnamese: Phường Tây Nam) is a ward of Ho Chi Minh City, Vietnam. It is one of the 168 new wards, communes and special zones of the city following the reorganization in 2025.

== Geography ==
According to Official Dispatch No. 2896/BNV-CQĐP dated May 27, 2025 of the Ministry of Home Affairs, following the merger, Tây Nam has a land area of 119.80 km², the population as of December 31, 2024 is 56,784 people, the population density is 473 people/km².

== History ==
On June 16, 2025, the National Assembly Standing Committee issued Resolution No. 1685/NQ-UBTVQH15 on the arrangement of commune-level administrative units of Ho Chi Minh City in 2025 (effective from June 16, 2025). Accordingly, the entire land area and population of An Tây ward of the former Bến Cát city and part of Thanh Tuyền, An Lập communes of the former Dầu Tiếng district will be integrated into a new ward named Tây Nam (Clause 93, Article 1).
