= Philippine Civic Action Group =

Philippine military contingent sent in Vietnam War

Philippine Civic Action Group – Vietnam (PHILCAG–V)
- Active: 1966–1973
- Disbanded: 1973
- Country: Philippines
- Allegiance: Philippines; South Vietnam
- Branch: Philippine Army
- Type: 3 engineering battalions 1 artillery battalion 1 infantry security battalion
- Role: Civic-Military Operations; Engineering; Medical Mission
- Size: 2,068 (Peak Strength)
- Garrison/HQ: Tay Ninh Combat Base
- Nickname: "Fighting Filipinos"
- Engagements: Vietnam War: Operation Attleboro

Commanders
- Notable commanders: BGen. Gaudencio V. Tobias; BGen. Ceferino S. Carreon

The Philippine Civic Action Group – Vietnam (PHILCAG–V) was the Armed Forces of the Philippines contingent sent to the Republic of Vietnam or South Vietnam during the Vietnam War. This was an answer by the Philippine government to the request made by South Vietnam and the United States for combat troops. While combat troops were sent, the main mission given to PHILCAG was in the area of pacification, civic engagement, engineering, and medical missions. At its peak, the PHILCAG-V had more than 182 officers and 1,882 enlisted personnel cantoned at the Tay Ninh Combat Base. In the course of 8 years, the Philippines sent about 10,450 personnel during the Vietnam. 9 members of the contingent have died, and more than 64 have been wounded.

The motto and philosophy of PHILCAG was "To build, not to destroy, bring happiness, not sorrow, develop good will, not hatred."

== History ==
=== Operation Brotherhood ===
In the aftermath of the First Indochina War, Pres. Ramon Magsaysay gave recognition to the Republic of Vietnam on July 14, 1955. Filipino civic minded groups led by the Philippine Jaycees joined "Operation Brotherhood" to help in the refugee crisis in South Vietnam. The Jaycees also conducted relief, sanitation, and medical missions at a refugee center in Saigon. From the initial 7 doctors and nurses, their numbers ballooned to 105, treating more than 400,000 patients in the first year alone.

Pres. Ngo Dinh Diem was initially cold over the presence of Filipino medical staff and was quoted in saying that Vietnam did not need “a bunch of orators and nightclub musicians,” referring to Filipinos in general. It was Edward Lansdale who convinced Ngo that Operation Brotherhood was vital to his fight against his communist counterparts in North Vietnam. It was however disclosed that Operation Brotherhood was run by Filipino medical staff but had nominal support from the Central Intelligence Agency through Lansdale.

Lansdale also organized for the Vietnamese leadership to send military officers from the ARVN to the Philippines for them to see Magsaysay administration's success in fighting the communist HUKBALAHAP. This was to help the Vietnamese build confidence in counterinsurgency. Magsaysay's Presidential Security Guard commander, Col. Napoleon D. Valeriano, was later sent to Vietnam to help organize Diem's Presidential Guards, and remove the Binh Xuyen influence from the organization.

=== Freedom Company ===
Operation Brotherhood was succeeded by the Freedom Company in 1955, and this time the CIA had full control of its operation. The contingent was mostly composed of Filipino World War II veterans, who were involved in guerilla warfare, the training of the Presidential Guards, as well as psychological warfare. The Freedom Company would later transform itself to the Eastern Construction Company (ECoy), as the direction was to transform the activities from a non-profit to commercial. ECoy would be headed by Col. Frisco San Juan, and would receive contracts wherein Vietnamese talent pool was not able to produce the technical staff to maintain and operate American made equipment. ECoy would continue its work into the late 1960s.

The withdrawal of the French from Indochina pulled the United States into the region. As the US involvement from military advisory role became deeper, this has pushed the US Army to actual combat against North Vietnamese forces and the Viet Cong (VC). This shift began during the Battle of Ia Drang in November 1965. Pres. Lyndon B. Johnson meanwhile wanted to have multinational face to the Vietnam conflict. He wanted "more flags" as this was a "good fight" against communism. The US Government put pressure on the Philippines to join in the fight, and capitalized on the domino theory, where if South Vietnam falls, the rest of Southeast Asia will fall - including the Philippines. While South Vietnam was not a member of the Southeast Asia Treaty Organization (SEATO), Johnson wanted the military alliance to play its part in the conflict, however there was lack of cooperation by the France and United Kingdom.

=== PHILCON-I ===
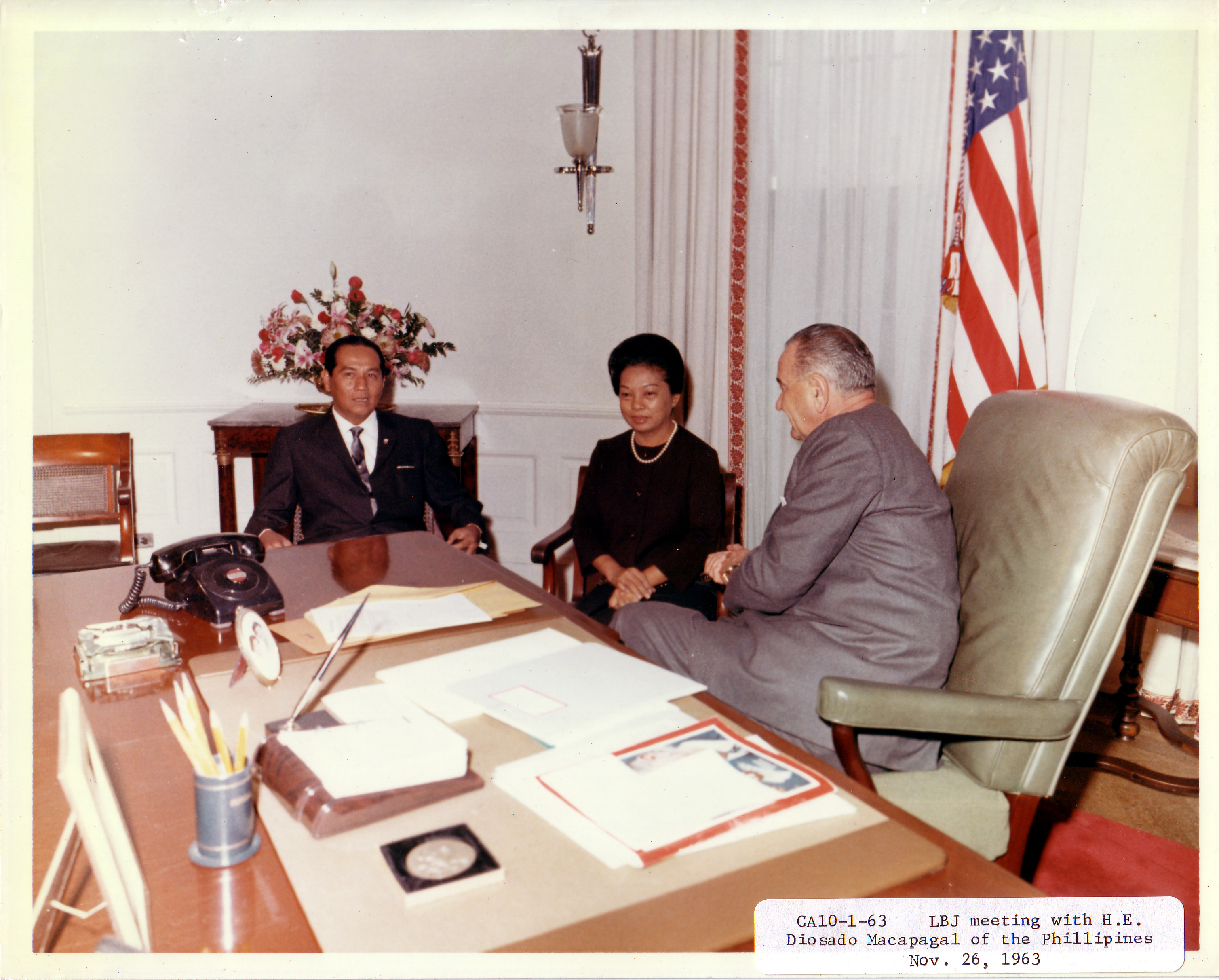
Pres. Macapagal in the Oval Office with Pres. Johnson

In July 1964, the Chairman of the Military Revolution, MGen. Nguyễn Khánh, sent a formal note to Pres. Diosdado Macapagal, requesting for military assistance in its fight against the Viet Cong. The Congress of the Philippines passed Republic Act 4162, approving the request and authorizing the President to send aid and support to South Vietnam. The act also allocated a budget of PhP 1 million. This was followed by a similar request by Prime Minister Phan Huy Quát in April 1965, requesting for 2,000 troops.

Pres. Macapagal mobilized the First Philippine Contingent (PHILCON I), which was composed of doctors, nurses, and civil military officers of the Armed Forces of the Philippines. Apart from civic military operations, the mission also included 16 Psychological Warfare Officers who arrived on August 16, 1964, were assigned to the III Corps in Binh Duong, Gia Dinh and Long An. As the officers of PHILCON I were quite effective in their assignments, the government of South Vietnam requested from the Philippines for additional personnel.

In October 1964, Macapagal was invited to a State Visit by Johnson. US military leadership wanted the Philippines to contribute technical personnel to support the Vietnamese Air Force, special forces platoons, medical company, engineering company, and Philippine Marines and Navy personnel to help the South Vietnamese Navy. US civilian leadership were more inclined in medical personnel and civic action group.

== Operations ==
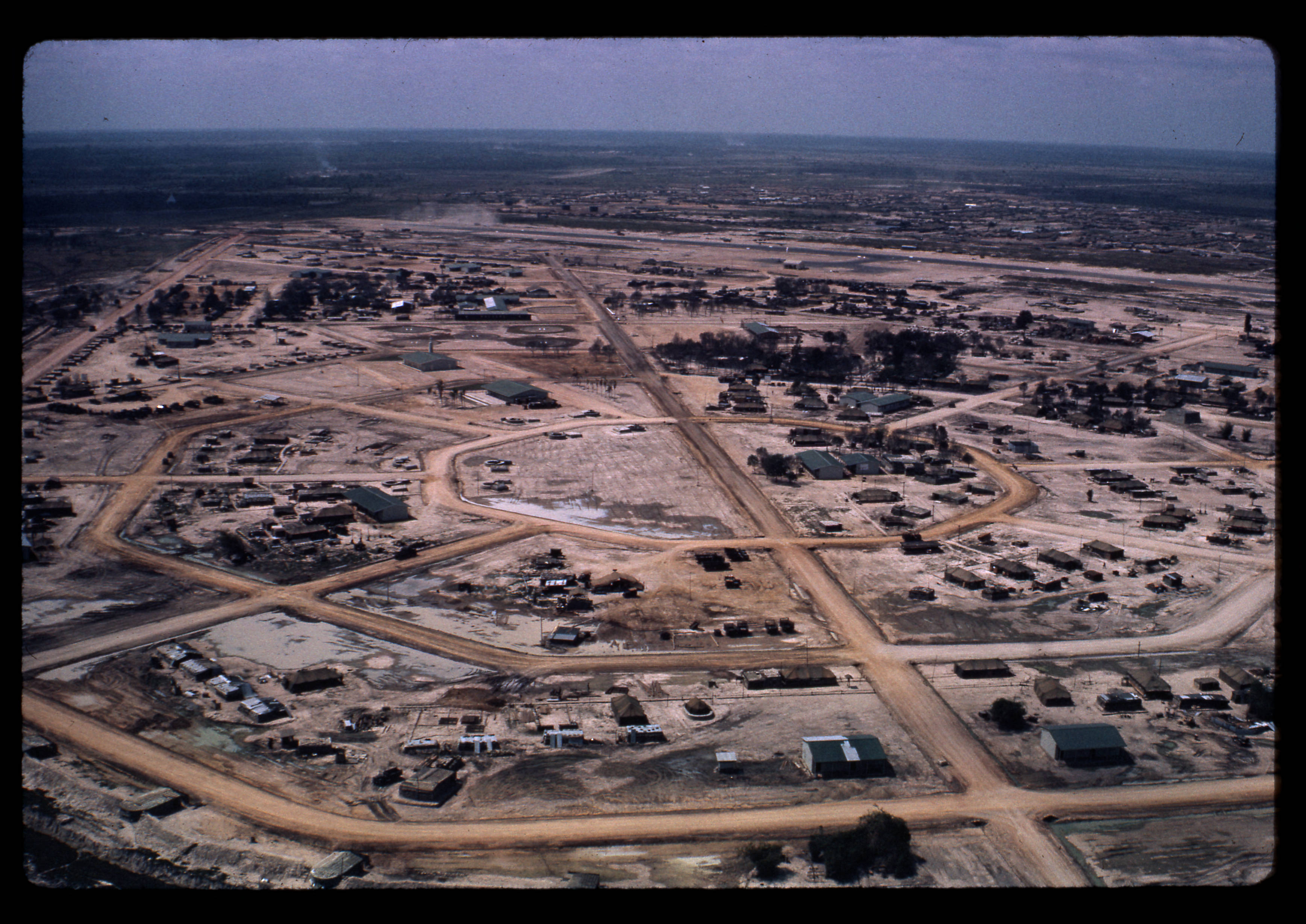
PHILCAG Cantonment east of the runway of Tay Ninh Combat Base.

On February 2, 1966, South Vietnam reiterated their request for engineering troops to help in the reconstruction efforts in the midst of the war. President Ferdinand Marcos requested from the Congress to appropriate funds for a 2nd contingent, and Republic Act 4664 was passed and signed on July 14, 1966, with an authorized budget of PhP 35 million. Johnson on the other hand pressed Marcos to send more, but Marcos was more concerned in presenting himself as an Asian leader that was out to help in bringing peace in Vietnam than fight. The other excuse was the limited budget allocated for the PHILCAG contingent. Johnson agreed to equip three engineering battalions, provide two anti-smuggling vessels for the Philippine Navy, and cover the allowances of the Filipino contingent.

In September 1966, the PHILCAG-V units established themselves west of the runway of the Tay Ninh Combat Base, under the control of the US 196th Light Infantry Brigade. The PHILCAG units immediately found themselves joining the 196th in Operation Attleboro, involving battalion sized probes in the vicinity of Tay Ninh. This operation netted a VC supply cache of 840 tons of rice in the Dầu Tiếng district. On November 3, the 9th Division of the VC and elements of the People's Army of Vietnam commenced their attack on the Tay Ninh Combat Base. The 196th and the PHILCAG encountered surprise attacks from various directions in the next two days. The PHILCAG would have four casualties during the battles.

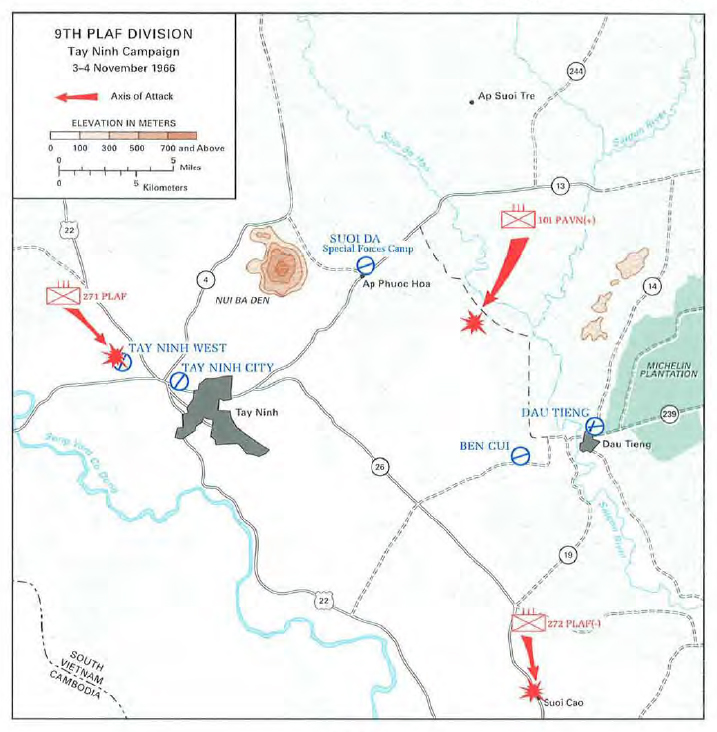
Operation Attleboro 3–4 November 1966

Marcos meanwhile was playing both sides, currying the favor of the Johnson, and on the other hand tasked General Tobias to contact the VC and explain the Philippines' position in the war. The mission was tasked to a Filipino army captain, which later on was disclosed as Jose Almonte. Three meetings were held in Tay Ninh, and three others in Cambodia. General William Westmoreland who headed the Military Assistance Command Vietnam, and Major general Frederick C. Weyand, who headed the operations in Tay Ninh, received intelligence of this PHILCAG secret mission, and were disappointed over the Philippine action to contact the VC.

On December 16, 1966, Westmoreland visited Manila and discusseed with Marcos the performance of the PHILCAG, and how this was viewed positively in Saigon and Washington. Westmoreland also raised the possibility of PHILCAG being expanded, and in return the US could supply and train a squadron of the Philippine Air Force to utilize the UH-1D Iroquois for their civic action operations in South Vietnam. Marcos was warm over this proposal, however upon review by the Secretary of State Dean Rusk and Secretary of Defense Robert McNamara, the proposal's formulation was placed in the backburner.

By January 1967, the local population at Tay Ninh saw the positive results of the projects implemented by the PHILCAG. The VC coordinated attacks in to disrupt the work on the resettlement camp at Thanh Dien, 3 km south of the PHILCAG base. In addition to the attacks, the insurgents implemented a propaganda campaign to discredit the Philippine effort in the province.

On July 16, 1967, Marcos visited Saigon and reiterated the direction of the Philippines in helping Vietnam in developing its countryside, and that PHILCAG was a "mission of peace." He and his entourage composed of Foreign Secretary, Narciso Ramos, and Defense Secretary Nestor Mata, Press Secretary Jose Aspiras were welcomed by President Nguyen Van Thieu. They visited the troops in Tay Ninh later that day, and inspected the project sites of PHILCAG.

By August 1967, the AFP began training the second batch of volunteer troops at Fort Magsaysay for the annual rotation.

== Drawdown ==
As Marcos faced another election year, the issue of having troops in Vietnam became a point of contention by the opposition. Marcos also had a hard time convincing Congress for budget allocation for the PHILCAG mission, leaving him no choice but to draw down. The Department of National Defense (DND) began reducing troop count late 1969. From a high level of 2,050 troops, the DND would send home 35 troops a week, until the force was reduced by 30% to about 1,400. The decision did not sit well with Pres. Johnson, and tasked the US Embassy in Manila to inform the Philippine government of his displeasure. This also included the suspension of the US military aid to the AFP, as well as cancelation of any procurement activities done in the Philippines by the Department of Defense for its efforts in Vietnam.

== Legacy ==
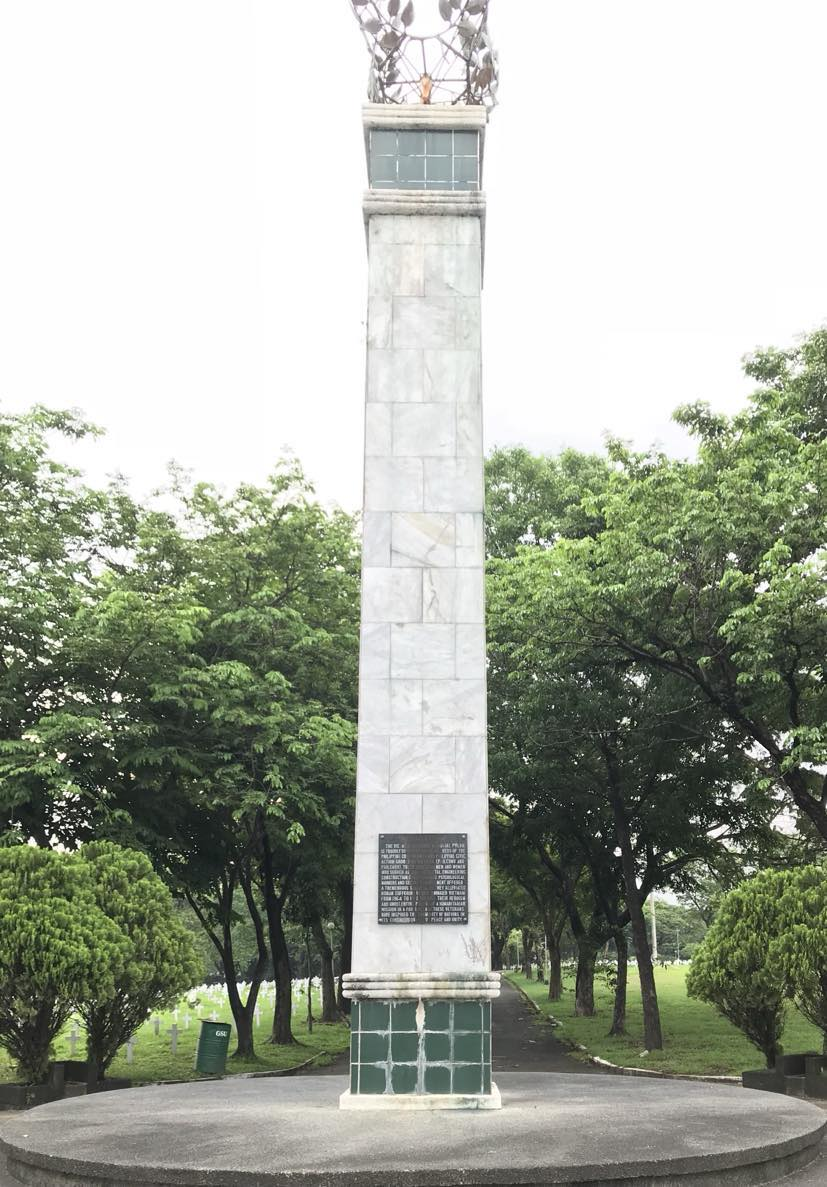
PHILCAG Column at the Libingan ng mga Bayani

The AFP Museum in Camp Aguinaldo states during its mobilization the PHILCAG in Vietnam constructed 116.4 kilometers of roads, 11 bridges, 169 buildings, 10 towers, 7 schools, 194 culverts and 54 refugee centers. The PHILCAG also cleared 7,78 hectares of forest land, converted 2,225 hectares into community projects, and transformed 10 hectares into demonstration farms. As part of the Miscellaneous Environmental Improvements Program, it rehabilitated, repaired or undertook minor construction work on 2 airstrips; 94 kilometers of roads; 47 buildings; 12 outposts; and 245 wells. The mission also trained 32 people in the use and maintenance of equipment; 138 in the field of health education; and provided professional training to 217 people. The PHILCAG also resettled 1,065 families, distributed 162,623 pounds of food boxes and sponsored 14 hamlets. Under the Medical-Civic Action Program, the PHILCAG contributed to 724,715 medical missions, 218,609 dental missions and 35,844 surgical missions.

A monument was erected in Libingan ng mga Bayani in Taguig City commemorating the efforts of the PHILCAG.

== Controversy ==
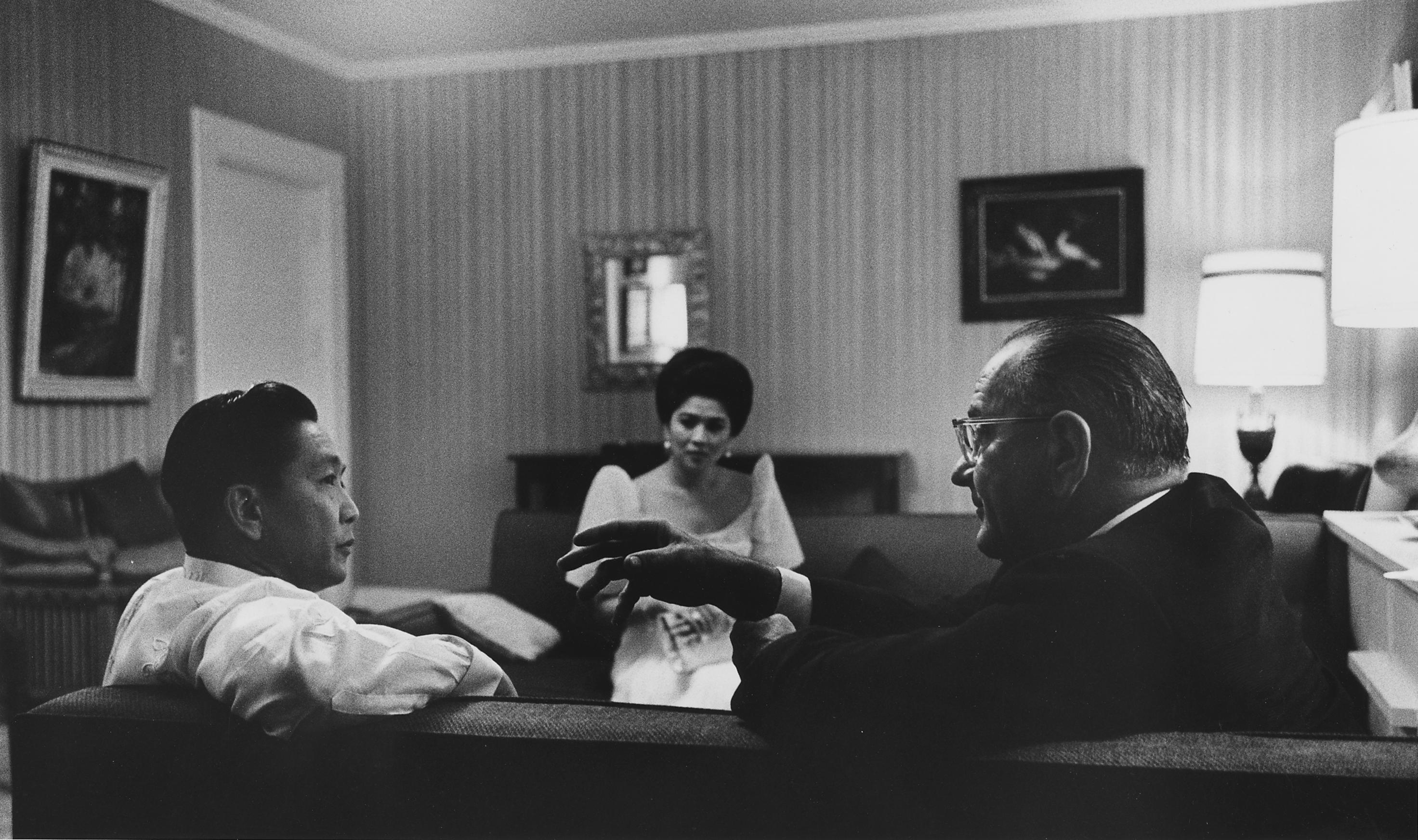
LBJ meets Ferdinand Marcos in Manila, October 23, 1966, to negotiate for more Filipino troops to Vietnam.

The Symington Subcommittee of the United States Senate investigated the arrangements made by the Johnson administration with the Marcos administration. While the United States provided the logistical requirements, transport, equipping 3 engineering battalions, as well as 2 anti-smuggling patrol ships, the scandal that rocked the administration was on the arrangement that the American taxpayers were shouldering the combat pay or per diem of Filipino soldiers who volunteered to go to South Vietnam. This information embarrassed both administrations as critics saw the arrangements as if PHILCAG was nothing more than a mercenary force contracted by the US Government. The other question raised was whether the payment of allowances were really given to the soldiers, or whether these were pocketed by Marcos.

There were also a number of cases of Filipinos becoming involved in profiteering in the black-market through US military PX Stores.

== Notable members ==
- Lt. Col. Fidel V. Ramos, future AFP Chief of Staff, Secretary of National Defense, President of the Philippines
- Lt. Col. Rafael Zagala, CO Security Battalion, future Commanding General of the Philippine Army
- Maj. Delfin Castro Intelligence Officer & Liaison Officer w/ MACV, future CO of the AFP SOUTHCOM
- Capt. Jose T. Almonte, Intelligence Officer, future National Security Advisor and head of the National Intelligence Coordinating Agency
- Capt. Eduardo Ermita
