= John F. Baker Jr. =

United States Army Medal of Honor recipient

John Franklin Baker Jr.
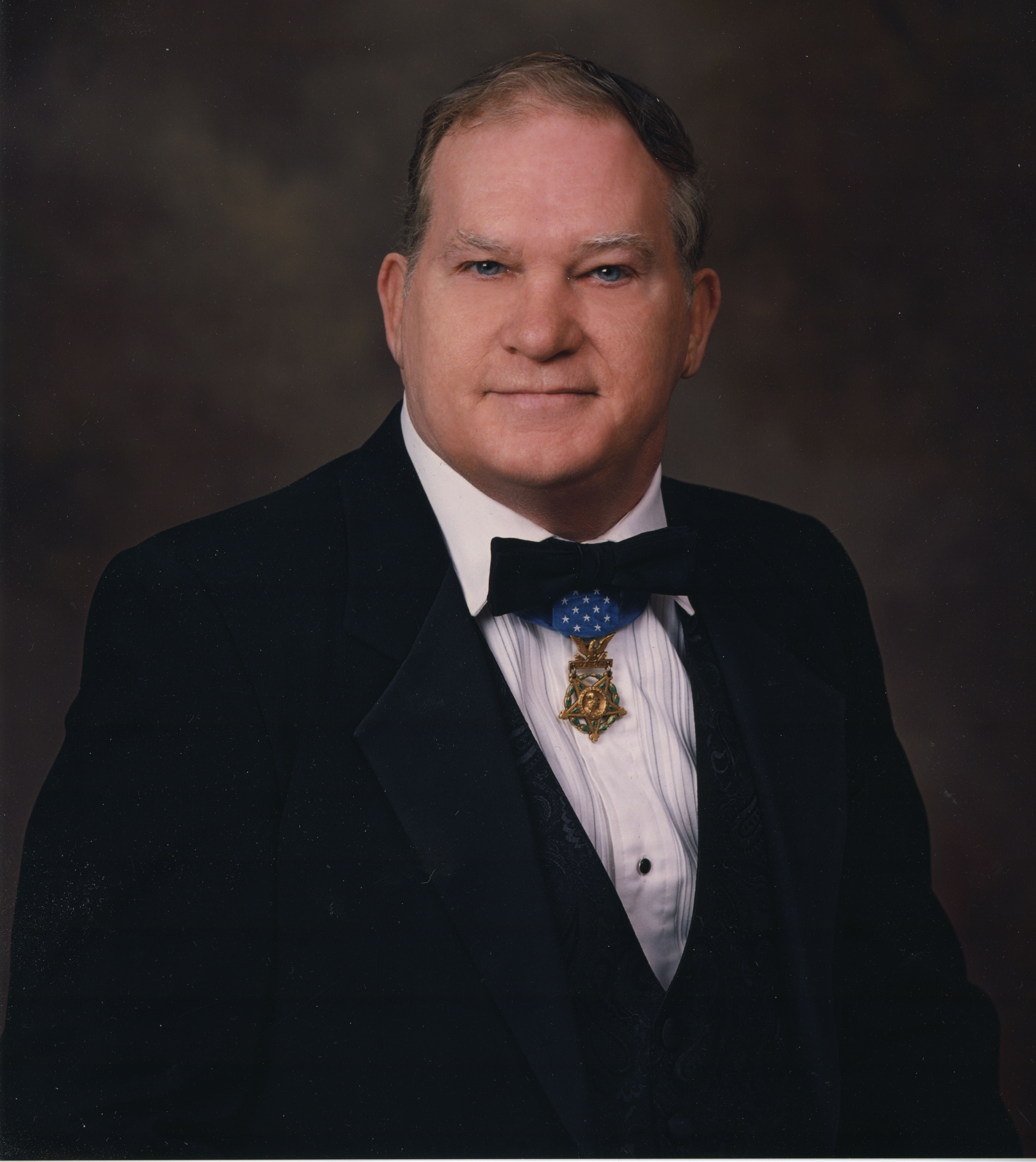
- Sgt. John F. Baker Jr.
- Born: October 30, 1945; Davenport, Iowa, U.S.
- Died: January 20, 2012 (aged 66); Columbia, South Carolina, U.S.
- Burial place: Arlington National Cemetery, Arlington, Virginia
- Military career
- Allegiance: United States
- Branch: United States Army
- Service years: 1966–1989
- Rank: Master Sergeant
- Units: 27th Infantry Regiment, 25th Infantry Division
- Conflicts: Vietnam War
- Awards: Medal of Honor; Silver Star; Legion of Merit; Bronze Star; Purple Heart; Order of St. Maurice (Primicerius)

John Franklin Baker Jr. (October 30, 1945 – January 20, 2012) was a United States Army master sergeant who served in the Vietnam War and a recipient of the Medal of Honor.

== Personal life ==
Baker was born in Davenport, Iowa, and attended Moline High School from 1963 to 1966. At 5' 1", he was a gymnast before joining the army. He became a "tunnel rat" in Vietnam, a soldier who entered Viet Cong tunnels searching out the enemy and destroying their caches of war material. Baker made the military his career, retiring in 1989. He then began working as a computer analyst at a Veterans Hospital in South Carolina. In addition to serving as the Vice-President of the Congressional Medal of Honor Society, he served as a member on the Nation's Monuments and Cemeteries Committee.

In 2008, the I-280 Bridge, connecting Davenport, Iowa with Rock Island, Illinois, was renamed the Sergeant John F. Baker Jr. Bridge in his honor.

In 2018, the Rock Island Arsenal in Rock Island, Illinois put his name on a street in its new Eagle Point Housing Area.

Baker suffered from heart problems in the last years of his life and began using oxygen in 2010. He died aged 66 on January 20, 2012, after collapsing at his Northeast Richland home.

== Career ==
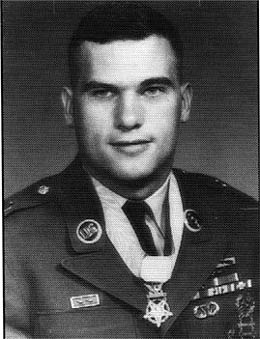
Baker in uniform

Baker entered the U.S. Army in Moline, Illinois, serving as a private in A Company, 2nd Battalion of the 27th Infantry Regiment, 25th Division. In Vietnam, he took part in Operation Attleboro which began in September 1966. On November 5, 1966, Baker and his unit were called to assist another squad who were taking enemy fire. En route, A Company began to take fire and lost their lead soldier. Together with two other soldiers, Baker took over the head of the column and assisted in destroying two enemy positions. They were moving to take two others when a hand grenade knocked Baker off his feet.

With the two other soldiers wounded, Baker "single-handedly" destroyed another bunker before recovering his comrades. Despite taking further fire from enemy bunkers and snipers, he continually fell back to replenish ammunition and take back several wounded. For these actions, he was awarded the Medal of Honor along with Captain Robert F. Foley, who also received the Medal of Honor for his actions in the battle. When awarding the medal, President Lyndon B Johnson stated:

The battlefield is the scarred and the lonely landscape of man's greatest failure. But is a place where heroes walk. Today we come here to the East Room of the White House to honor two soldiers, two soldiers who—in the same battle and at the same time—met the surpassing tests of their lives with acts of courage far beyond the call of duty. Captain Foley and Sergeant Baker fought in the same company. Now, together, they join the noblest company of them all. They fought because their Nation believed that only by honoring its commitments, and only by denying aggression its conquest, could the conditions of peace be created in Southeast Asia and the world.

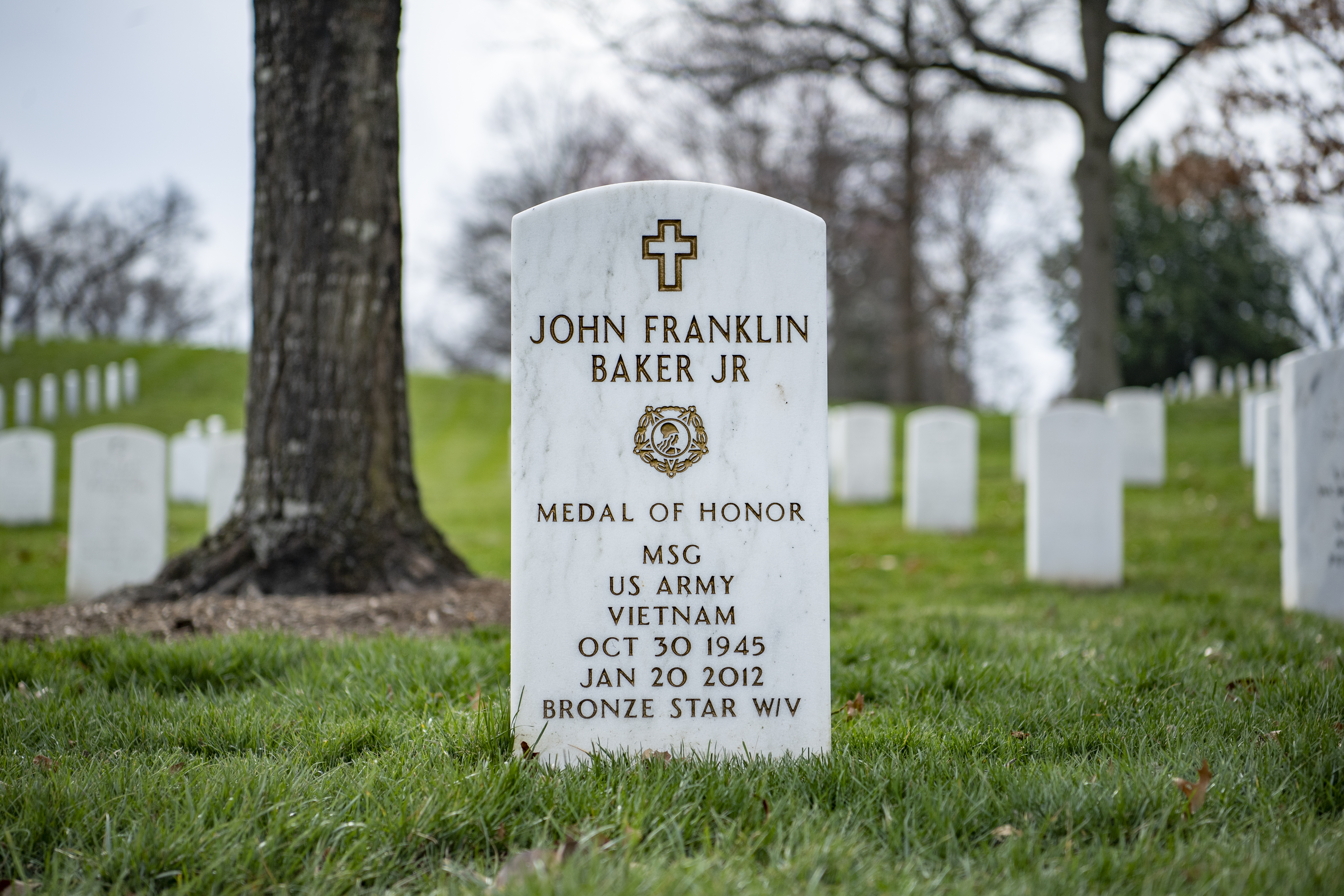
Grave at Arlington National Cemete

== Medal of Honor citation ==
Rank and organization: Sergeant (then Pfc.), U.S. Army, Company A, 2d Battalion, 27th Infantry, 25th Infantry Division. Place and date: Republic of Vietnam, November 5, 1966. Entered service at: Moline, Ill. Born: October 30, 1945, Davenport, Iowa.

Citation:

For conspicuous gallantry and intrepidity in action at the risk of his life above and beyond the call of duty. En route to assist another unit that was engaged with the enemy, Company A came under intense enemy fire and the lead man was killed instantly. Sgt. John Baker immediately moved to the head of the column and together with another soldier knocked out 2 enemy bunkers. When his comrade was mortally wounded, Sgt. John Baker, spotting 4 Viet Cong snipers, killed all of them, evacuated the fallen soldier and returned to lead repeated assaults against the enemy positions, killing several more Viet Cong. Moving to attack 2 additional enemy bunkers, he and another soldier drew intense enemy fire and Sgt. John Baker was blown from his feet by an enemy grenade. He quickly recovered and single-handedly destroyed 1 bunker before the other soldier was wounded. Seizing his fallen comrade's machine gun, Sgt. John Baker charged through the deadly fusillade to silence the other bunker. He evacuated his comrade, replenished his ammunition and returned to the forefront to brave the enemy fire and continue the fight. When the forward element was ordered to withdraw, he carried 1 wounded man to the rear. As he returned to evacuate another soldier, he was taken under fire by snipers, but raced beyond the friendly troops to attack and kill the snipers. After evacuating the wounded man, he returned to cover the deployment of the unit. His ammunition now exhausted, he dragged 2 more of his fallen comrades to the rear. Sgt. John Baker's selfless heroism, indomitable fighting spirit, and extraordinary gallantry were directly responsible for saving the lives of several of his comrades, and inflicting serious damage on the enemy. His acts were in keeping with the highest traditions of the U.S. Army and reflect great credit upon himself and the Armed Forces of his country.

== Awards and decorations ==

Badge	Combat Infantryman Badge		
1st row	Medal of Honor		Silver Star
2nd row	Legion of Merit	Bronze Star Medal with "V" Device	Purple Heart
3rd row	Air Medal	Army Commendation Medal	Army Good Conduct Medal with 7 Good Conduct Loops
4th row	National Defense Service Medal	Vietnam Service Medal with 2 Campaign stars	NCO Professional Development Ribbon with Numeral 3
5th row	Army Service Ribbon	Overseas Service Ribbon	Vietnam Campaign Medal
Badge	Parachutist Badge		
Unit awards	Presidential Unit Citation		Republic of Vietnam Gallantry Cross Unit Citation with Palm

== See also ==
- List of Medal of Honor recipients for the Vietnam War
