= Robert W. Hartsock =

Robert Willard Hartsock
- Army Medal of Honor
- Born: January 24, 1945; Cumberland, Maryland, US
- Died: February 23, 1969 (aged 24); Hậu Nghĩa Province, Republic of Vietnam
- Burial place: Rocky Gap Veterans Cemetery, Flintstone, Maryland
- Military career
- Allegiance: United States
- Branch: United States Army
- Service years: 1967–1969
- Rank: Staff Sergeant
- Unit: 25th Infantry Division
- Conflicts: Vietnam War †
- Awards: Medal of Honor; Purple Heart

Robert Willard Hartsock (January 24, 1945 – February 23, 1969) was a United States Army soldier and a recipient of the United States military's highest decoration—the Medal of Honor—for his actions in the Vietnam War.

== Biography ==
Hartsock joined the army from Fairmont, West Virginia in 1967, and by February 23, 1969, was serving as a staff sergeant in the 44th Infantry Platoon Scout Dog (IPSD), 3rd Brigade, 25th Infantry Division. During a firefight on that day, in Hậu Nghĩa Province, Republic of Vietnam during Operation Toan Thang III, Hartsock smothered an enemy satchel charge with his body to protect those around him and was mortally wounded in the explosion.

Hartsock, aged 24 at his death, was buried in Rocky Gap Veterans Cemetery, Flintstone, Maryland.

== Medal of Honor citation ==
Staff Sergeant Hartsock's official Medal of Honor citation reads:

For conspicuous gallantry and intrepidity in action at the risk of his life above and beyond the call of duty. S/Sgt. Hartsock, distinguished himself in action while serving as section leader with the 44th Infantry Platoon. When the Dầu Tiếng Base Camp came under a heavy enemy rocket and mortar attack, S/Sgt. Hartsock and his platoon commander spotted an enemy sapper squad which had infiltrated the camp undetected. Realizing the enemy squad was heading for the brigade tactical operations center and nearby prisoner compound, they concealed themselves and, although heavily outnumbered, awaited the approach of the hostile soldiers. When the enemy was almost upon them, S/Sgt. Hartsock and his platoon commander opened fire on the squad. As a wounded enemy soldier fell, he managed to detonate a satchel charge he was carrying. S/Sgt. Hartsock, with complete disregard for his life, threw himself on the charge and was gravely wounded. In spite of his wounds, S/Sgt. Hartsock crawled about 5 meters to a ditch and provided heavy suppressive fire, completely pinning down the enemy and allowing his commander to seek shelter. S/Sgt. Hartsock continued his deadly stream of fire until he succumbed to his wounds. S/Sgt. Hartsock's extraordinary heroism and profound concern for the lives of his fellow soldiers were in keeping with the highest traditions of the military service and reflect great credit on him, his unit, and the U.S. Army.

== See also ==
- List of Medal of Honor recipients
- List of Medal of Honor recipients for the Vietnam War
