= Sergeant John F. Baker Jr. Bridge =

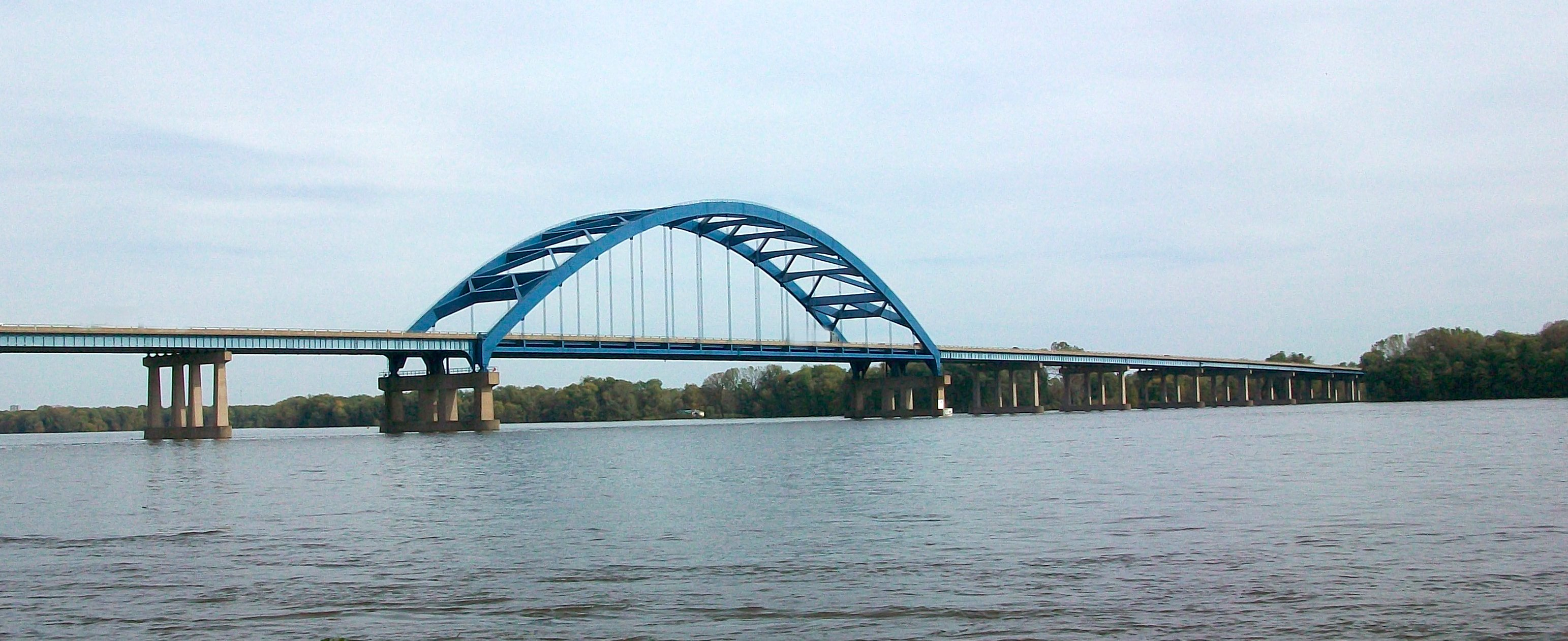
- I-280 Bridge from Davenport
- Coordinates: 41°28′45″N 90°37′56″W
- Carries: 4 lanes of I-280
- Crosses: Mississippi River
- Locale: Davenport, Iowa, and Rock Island, Illinois
- Official name: Sergeant John F. Baker Jr. Bridge
- Other name(s): I-280 Bridge
- Maintained by: Illinois Department of Transportation

Characteristics
- Design: Tied arch bridge
- Total length: 4,194 feet (1,278 m)
- Width: 82 feet, 4 lanes
- Longest span: 175 metres (574 ft)

History
- Opened: October 25, 1973; 51 years ago

Statistics
- Daily traffic: 21,200

The Sergeant John F. Baker Jr. Bridge, also known as the Baker Bridge or Interstate 280 Bridge, carries Interstate 280 (I-280) across the Mississippi River between Davenport, Iowa, and Rock Island, Illinois. The bridge opened in 1973 with a blue and yellow color scheme, thought to be unique in the state. In 2007, it was repainted all blue. On July 30, 2010, the bridge was officially named the Sergeant John F. Baker Jr. Bridge.

On May 2, 2019, the bridge, along with several other bridges in the Quad Cities area, were temporarily closed to all traffic due to severe flooding of the Mississippi River and the Rock River, and a subsequent levee breach in Davenport.

== See also ==
- List of crossings of the Upper Mississippi River
