= Dầu Tiếng Base Camp =

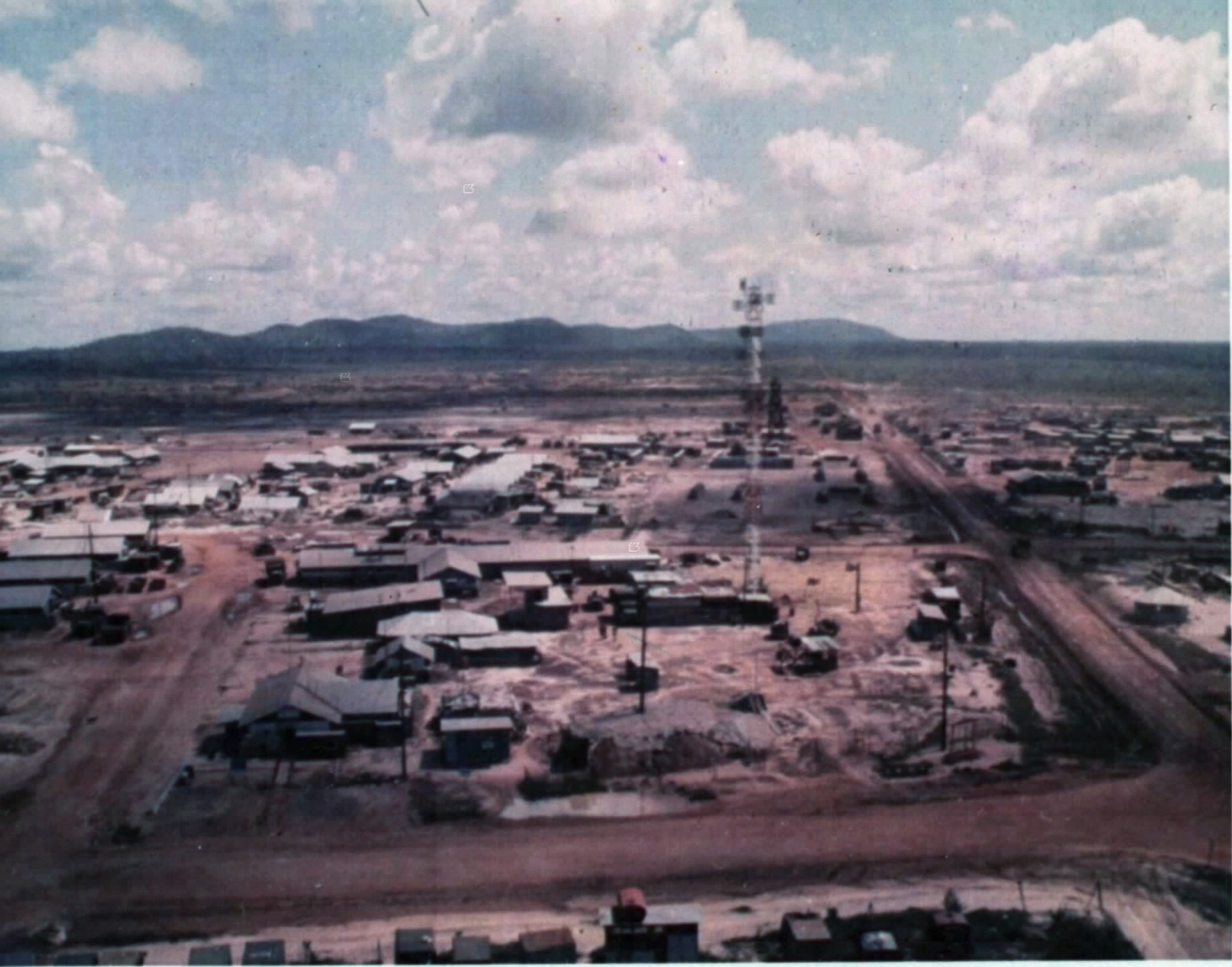
- Dầu Tiếng Base Camp, July 1970

Site information
- Type: Army Base

Location
- Coordinates: 11.283°N 106.363°E

Site history
- Built: 1966
- In use: 1966-75
- Battles/wars: Vietnam War

Garrison information
- Occupants: 3rd Brigade, 4th Infantry Division; 25th Infantry Division; 1st Brigade, 1st Infantry Division

Dầu Tiếng Airfield
- IATA: none; ICAO: none

Summary
- Elevation AMSL: 76 ft (23 m)

Runways
Direction	Length		Surface
Direction	ft	m	Surface
	2,500	762	laterite

Dầu Tiếng Base Camp (also known as LZ Dầu Tiếng or Camp Rainier) is a former U.S. Army and Army of the Republic of Vietnam (ARVN) base in the town of Dầu Tiếng in Bình Dương Province in southern Vietnam.

== History ==
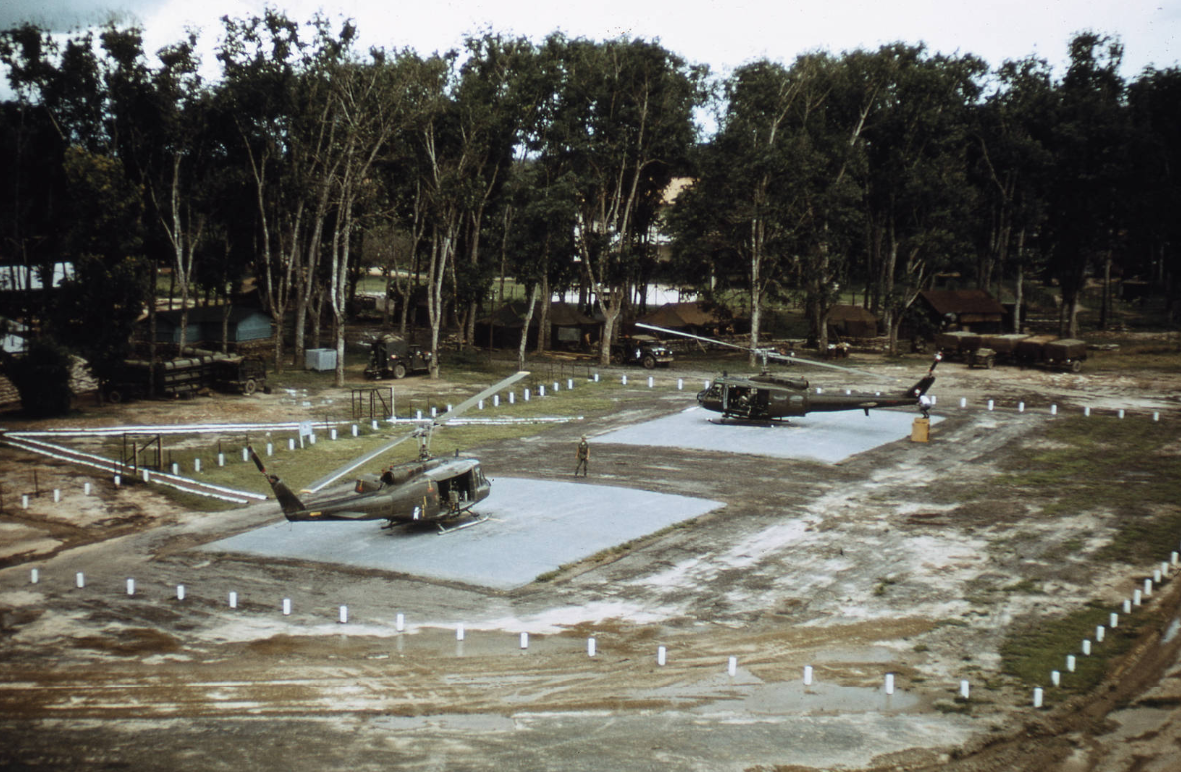
Dau Tieng helipads, 23 September 1967

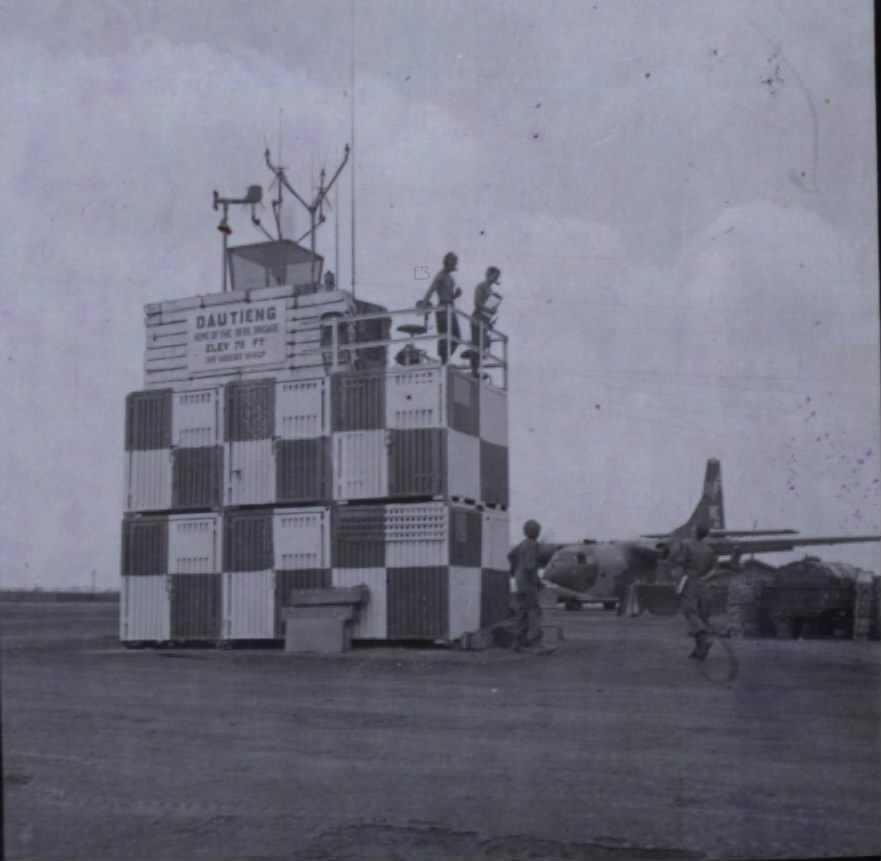
Air controllers of the 2nd Battalion, 28th Infantry calling in aircraft to lift troops for redeployment, 18 February 1970

The base was established in October 1966. The camp was located in the Dầu Tiếng District, 60 km northwest of Tan Son Nhut Air Base and 24 km east of Tây Ninh between the Saigon River and the Michelin Rubber Plantation.

The 3rd Brigade, 4th Infantry Division comprising:

- 2nd Battalion, 12th Infantry
- 2nd Battalion, 22nd Infantry
- 3rd Battalion, 22nd Infantry

was based at Dầu Tiếng from December 1966-June 1967. On 1 August 1967 the 3rd Brigade became part of the 25th Infantry Division, while the 25th Infantry Division's 3rd Brigade at Đức Phổ Base Camp became part of the 4th Infantry Division. The 3rd Brigade was based at Dầu Tiếng from March 1968-July 1969 and from August–November 1970.

On 24 June 1967 a Vietcong (VC) mortar attack on Camp Rainier disabled 29 UH-1 helicopters of the 188th Assault Helicopter Company.

On 4 July 1968 the base was subjected to a heavy People's Army of Vietnam (PAVN) rocket and mortar attack followed by probes on the base perimeter resulting in 5 U.S. and 16 PAVN killed.

On 23 February 1969 the base was attacked by PAVN sappers. SSGT Robert W. Hartsock would be posthumously awarded the Medal of Honor for his actions during the attack. 21 U.S. and 73 PAVN were killed in the attack.

The 1st Brigade, 1st Infantry Division comprising:

- 1st Battalion, 2nd Infantry
- 2nd Battalion, 2nd Infantry
- 1st Battalion, 26th Infantry

was based at Dầu Tiếng from July–November 1969 and January–February 1970.

The 1st Brigade, 25th Infantry Division comprising:

- 4th Battalion, 9th Infantry
- 4th Battalion, 23rd Infantry

was based at Dầu Tiếng in August and from October–December 1970.

Other units based at Dầu Tiếng included:

- 1st Battalion, 5th Infantry (February 1970)
- 2nd Battalion, 14th Infantry
- 2nd Battalion, 11th Artillery
- 1st Battalion, 27th Artillery (November 1967-February 1970)
- 1st Battalion, 77th Artillery
- 2nd Battalion, 77th Artillery (October 1966 – 1969)
- 2nd Battalion, 319th Artillery

== Current use ==
Part of the base appears to remain in use by the PAVN. The airfield is no longer used but remains visible on satellite images
