= Jose T. Almonte =

Filipino general

Jose Tan Almonte OS
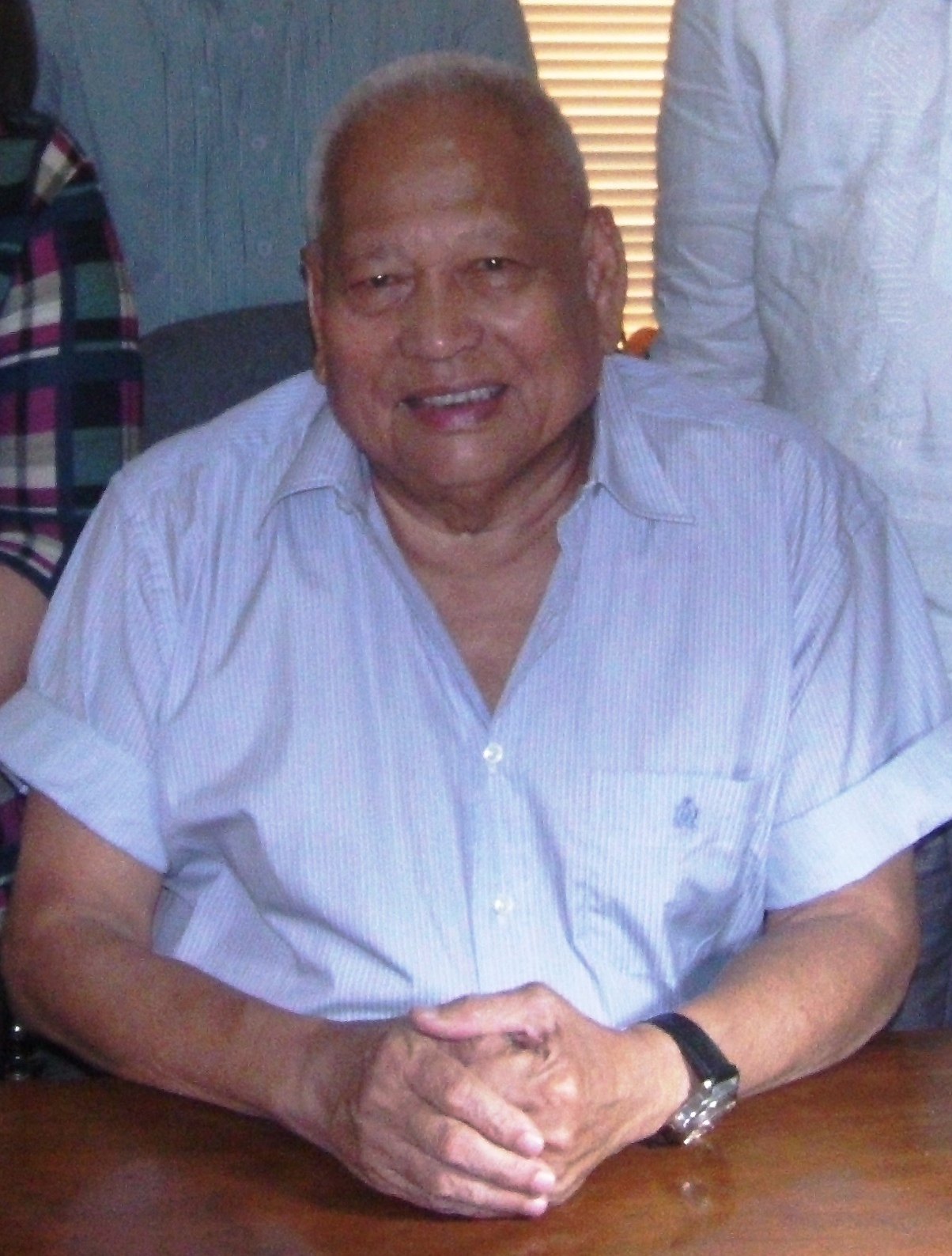
- Almonte in November 2014
- Born: November 27, 1931 (age 94); Malinao, Albay, Philippine Islands
- Military career
- Allegiance: Republic of the Philippines
- Branch: Philippine Army
- Service years: 1956–1986
- Rank: Major General
- Nicknames: Joe, JoAl, JoeAl
- Units: Presidential Security Agency; Philippine Civic Action Group (PHILCAGV)
- Commands: Armed Forces of the Philippines
- Conflicts: Vietnam War; Hukbalahap Rebellion; Insurgency in the Philippines
- Awards: Distinguished Conduct Star
- Other work: Economic Intelligence and Investigation Bureau (EIIB); National Intelligence Coordinating Agency; National Security Advisor

Jose Tan Almonte (born November 27, 1931) is a retired Filipino Army general. He was the National Security Advisor and Director-General of the National Security Council in the Cabinet of Philippine President Fidel V. Ramos. He was also the head of the National Intelligence Coordinating Agency and the Director of the Economic Intelligence and Investigation Bureau (EIIB) during the administration of President Corazon Aquino.

Prior to his retirement from the Armed Forces of the Philippines in 1986, Almonte was the Deputy Chief of Staff for Civil-Military Relations.

== Early years ==
Jose Almonte was born to a poor family in Bgy. Estancia, in Malinao, Albay on November 27, 1931 to Luis Almonte, a bus conductor, and Priscilla a school teacher. He took his primary education in Malinao town proper, and later took up his secondary education in Tabaco City. When Almonte's mother became bed-ridden, his maternal grandmother joined the household and played a significant role in his upbringing.

Almonte initially thought of taking up medicine or law, but he received a letter from a former high schoolmate, David Abundo, who was then studying at the Philippine Military Academy in Baguio. According to Almonte in his memoirs, he chose to pursue a career in the military as this was one of the options which allowed him to pursue free education.

== Military and political career ==
=== Military career ===
Almonte entered the Philippine Military Academy as a plebe on April 1, 1952, joining the Class of '56. He became the Associate Editor of the student publication The Corps.

As a young Lieutenant, he was assigned in Gitingan in the mountains of Laguna and Quezon provinces during the waning days of the HUKBALAHAP. A neighboring unit then was commanded by Korean War veteran Capt. Fidel Ramos, and it was here where Lt. Almonte forged a lifelong friendship with Capt. Ramos, who later became the President of the Philippines.

Almonte testifies that this was his only "field command" as he was confronted by his own troops about field mismanagement, that was led to a formal complaint up to the Company level. Instead of being court-martialed for command responsibility as he requested, Almonte was sent to Fort McKinley to go through a Combat Intelligence course. He said that this incident made a profound impact on his idealism on soldiery and opened his "eyes to the realities and consequences of military mismanagement in the field."

During the administration of President Diosdado Macapagal, Almonte served as the Deputy Commander of the Presidential Security Agency.

Under pressure from the American government, President Ferdinand Marcos wielded support of its campaign in the Vietnam War. Almonte was assigned in a three-man advance party along with Maj. Fidel Ramos to lay down the ground work for the arrival of the Philippine Civic Action Group (PHILCAGV).

Almonte acted as the Intelligence Officer for PHILCAGV. In this capacity, without escaping controversy and the ire of the American intelligence community in Vietnam, Almonte was able to successfully contact his counterparts in the Viet Cong. This later on built Almonte's reputation as a deep-penetration agent.

Building good relations with the local Viet Cong commander in Tay Ninh Province, in the southwestern part of South Vietnam, he assured them that the PHILCAGV was in their country to help build and provide civic services and not conduct combat operations. PHILCAGV was able to keep its casualties down. Instead of the usual one-year assignment, Almonte rotated three years in Vietnam with the PHILCAGV. For his gallantry in Vietnam from 1967 to 1969, he was awarded by Marcos the Distinguished Conduct Star.

Upon return to the Philippines, he was once more assigned to work in Malacañang Palace as aide-de-camp to Executive Secretary Alejandro Melchor Jr. It was during this career season that Almonte along with Melchor was able to establish the diplomatic ties between the Philippines and the USSR through the help of Prof. Ajit Singh Rye of the Institute of Asian Studies in the University of the Philippines. It was through Rye that Melchor andAlmonte was able to pave way for an endorsement to Prime Minister Indira Gandhi for a dialogue with Moscow. Despite the Philippines being considered as the United States' strongest ally in Southeast Asia, the Marcos government saw that the US was going to lose in Vietnam, and thus the need to establish ties with the "enemy." With one visit to New Delhi in 1975, Almonte met with the Soviet Ambassador, which led to a flight by Melchor and Almonte to Moscow where they were received as state guests. By 1976, the Philippines and the Soviet Union formally established diplomatic relations.

=== Reformed the Armed Forces Movement ===
Considered as one of the level-headed thinkers and strategist in the AFP, Almonte was approached by the leaders of the Reform the Armed Forces Movement (RAM) during its infancy, to seek counsel and have him take as an advisor to the group. Almonte worked with Lt. Col. Victor Batac in formulating long-term strategies of the group, leading him to be considered as the "Godfather of the RAM".

As the RAM leadership was planning for the overthrow of the Marcos family, Almonte was to ambush and kill BGen. Rolando Pattugalan, the Philippine Army's former Intelligence Chief, and during the early 1986 was the Commanding General of the 2nd Infantry Division in Tanay, Rizal, who was known as a Marcos supporter. The elimination of BGen. Pattugalan would create havoc, given that he was being eyed to replace the Army Chief, MGen. Josephus Ramas.

Almonte retired from the AFP in 1986 with a rank of Major General.

=== Political career ===
Right after his retirement, President Cory Aquino called on Almonte to take charge of Operation Big Bird, the government's efforts in recovering the hidden wealth of the late President Ferdinand E. Marcos in Switzerland and other offshore banking areas. When Operation Big Bird was wrapped up by the Presidential Commission on Good Government (PCGG), Almonte was tasked by Aquino to head the EIIB.

From 1992 to 1998, Almonte was a key member of the Cabinet of President Fidel V. Ramos as National Security Advisor, and Director-General of the National Security Council. Despite his position, Almonte became the cabinet's point person when it comes to demonopolization. Almonte also played a significant role in the Ramos Administration's campaign for "Philippines 2000," which brought economic reforms, liberalization, creation of the Philippine Economic Zone Authority, and attracted foreign investments into the country.

In 1995 the Polytechnic University of the Philippines awarded him an Honorary Doctorate in Public Administration.

In 1997, the Philippines became involved in a North Korean defection episode. Hwang Jang-yop, who served as the Chairman of the Supreme People's Assembly from 1972 to 1983, defected to South Korea. He initially walked into the South Korean embassy in Beijing posing as one of their diplomats. The Chinese government cordoned off the embassy, preventing the defectors from leaving, but a few weeks later a deal was brokered, and Hwang and his companion Kim Duk-hong were permitted to fly out of Beijing for a 3rd country. The Philippines was selected as a transit point before they could continue to South Korea. President Ramos tasked Almonte in ensuring the safety of the North Korean defectors. Hwang and Kim arrived in Clark Air Base, and were taken custody by the National Intelligence Coordinating Agency (NICA) and brought them to a safe house in Baguio. The media soon found out, and Baguio was the center of a media frenzy. This prompted the NICA to move Hwang and Kim to another safe house near Manila. After two weeks, Hwang and Kim were turned over to the South Korean authorities, and were flown to Seoul.

== Later Years ==
During the first 100 days of the Duterte administration, Almonte was invited among 3 private individuals to the Malacanang Press briefing. According to the Presidential Communications Office, Almonte said that the Duterte's first 100 days was "exceptional" in terms of the insurgency, broken politics, and monopolies. Almonte also added that Duterte at least should make "less colorful statements." He also commented on the Duterte foreign policy, and agreed that we should be friendly to all nations, but the withdrawal from Enhanced Defense Cooperation Agreement (EDCA) could have a "negative impact on the surface."

In 2018, amid the intensified political feud between President Rodrigo Duterte and Senator Antonio Trillanes, Almonte publicly criticized Duterte's decision to revoke the amnesty previously granted to Trillanes by President Benigno Aquino III.

== Controversies ==
On February 25, 2015, Almonte launched a book entitled Endless Journey: A Memoir as told to veteran journalist Marites Dañguilan-Vitug.

In the book, he recalled the late years of the regime led by Marcos and the birth of the Reform the Armed Forces Movement.

Leaders of the RAM, however, including Sen. Gregorio Honasan, then a colonel, belied Almonte's narrative in the book, which they called "dishonest and irresponsible", and "were directly in conflict with the reality at the time."

== Awards and citations ==
- Distinguished Conduct Star
- Order of Sikatuna, Rank of Datu

== Bibliography ==
- Toward one Southeast Asia : collected speeches; Quezon City : Institute for Strategic and Development Studies, 2004. xvi, 318 p. : port.; 23 cm. ISBN 971891613X
- My part in the 1986 people power revolution; Quezon City : Institute for Strategic and Development Studies, 2006. 80 p. : facsims; 19 cm.
- We Must Level the Playing Field; Metro Manila, Philippines : Foundation for Economic Freedom, 2007. xvi, 273 p.; 26 cm. ISBN 9789718310014

== See also ==
- Fidel Ramos
