= Robert F. Foley =

United States Army general

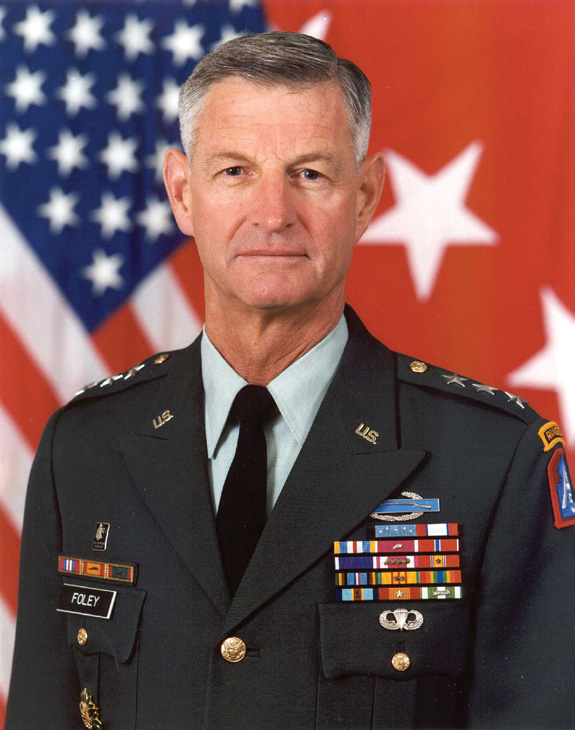
- Born: May 30, 1941 (age 85); Newton, Massachusetts, U.S.
- Military career
- Allegiance: United States
- Branch: United States Army
- Service years: 1963–2000
- Rank: Lieutenant General
- Commands: Fifth United States Army; United States Army Military District of Washington; 2nd Brigade, 3rd Infantry Division; 1st Battalion, 4th Infantry Regiment
- Conflicts: Vietnam War; Operation Attleboro
- Awards: Medal of Honor; Army Distinguished Service Medal (2); Defense Superior Service Medal; Legion of Merit (6); Bronze Star Medal; Purple Heart; Meritorious Service Medal (5)
- Other work: President of Marion Military Institute

Robert Franklin Foley (born May 30, 1941) is a retired United States Army officer who served in the Vietnam War. He received the Medal of Honor for leading his unit in an assault on a strong enemy position on November 5, 1966, during Operation Attleboro.

== Military career ==
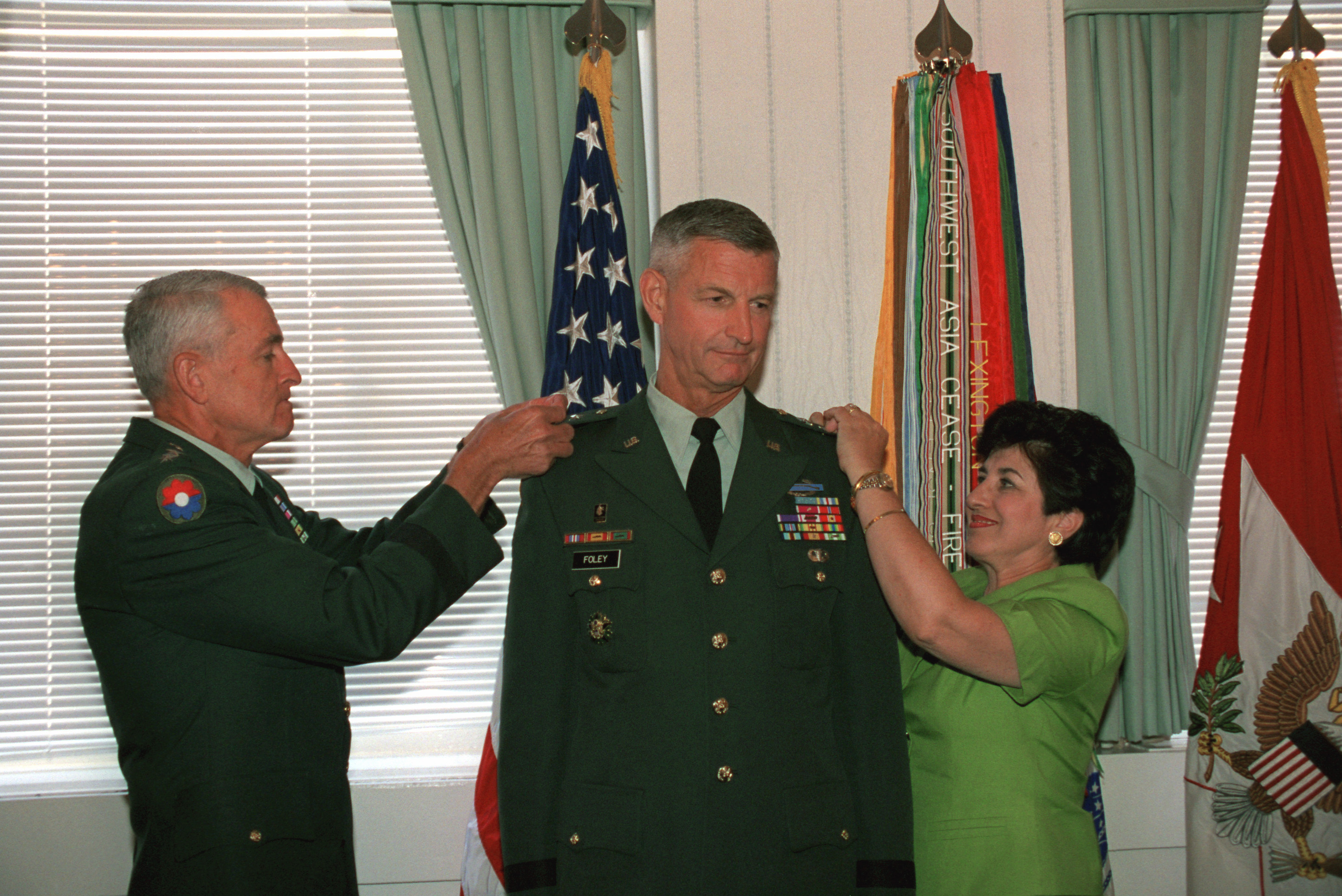
Foley's promotion to lieutenant general on August 5, 1998.

Foley is a 1963 graduate of the United States Military Academy at West Point and was commissioned an infantry officer. He has held numerous command and staff positions throughout 37 years of active service. He has a Master of Business Administration from Fairleigh Dickinson University.

Foley's command positions include Company A, 2nd Battalion, 27th Infantry Regiment, 25th Infantry Division in South Vietnam and battalion and brigade command with the 3rd Infantry Division in West Germany. He served as chief of staff for the 7th Infantry Division (Light), Fort Ord, California; executive officer to the assistant secretary of the army for manpower and reserve affairs; assistant division commander, 2nd Infantry Division, Commandant of Cadets, United States Military Academy, West Point, New York; deputy commanding general, Second United States Army, Fort Gillem, Georgia; commanding general, United States Army Military District of Washington; and commanding general, Fifth United States Army, Fort Sam Houston, Texas.

== Awards and decorations ==
Foley's awards for peacetime and combat include the Medal of Honor, two Army Distinguished Service Medals, the Defense Superior Service Medal, six Legions of Merit, the Bronze Star Medal, the Purple Heart, five Meritorious Service Medals and the Combat Infantryman's Badge. He was also awarded the Parachutist Badge and the Ranger Tab.

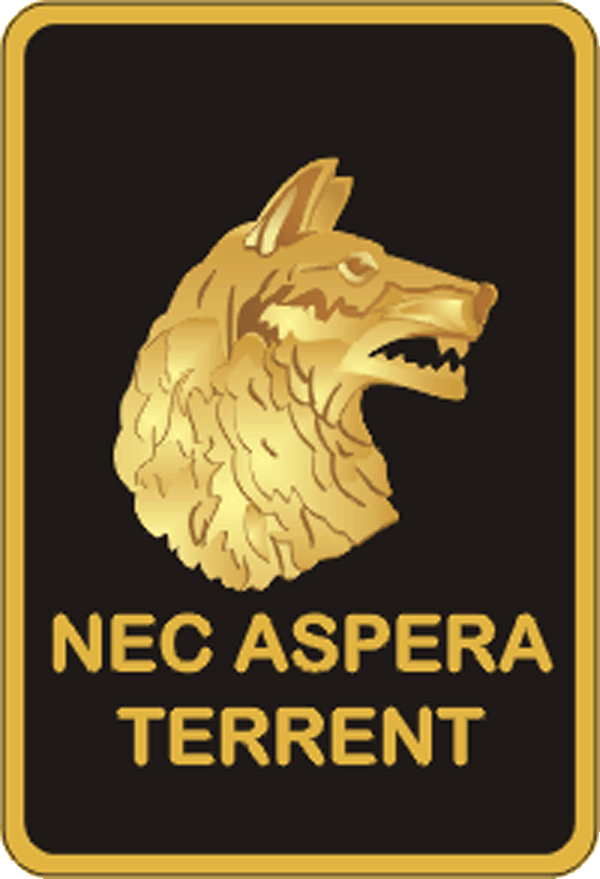

== Later life ==
After his retirement in 2000, Foley served as president of Marion Military Institute (MMI) in Marion, Alabama, until his resignation at the end of academic year 2003–2004. During his tenure at MMI, the school saw tremendous growth and recognition in Alabama, and across the United States. On October 1, 2005, Foley became the eighth director of Army Emergency Relief.

== Medal of Honor citation ==
Medal of Honor

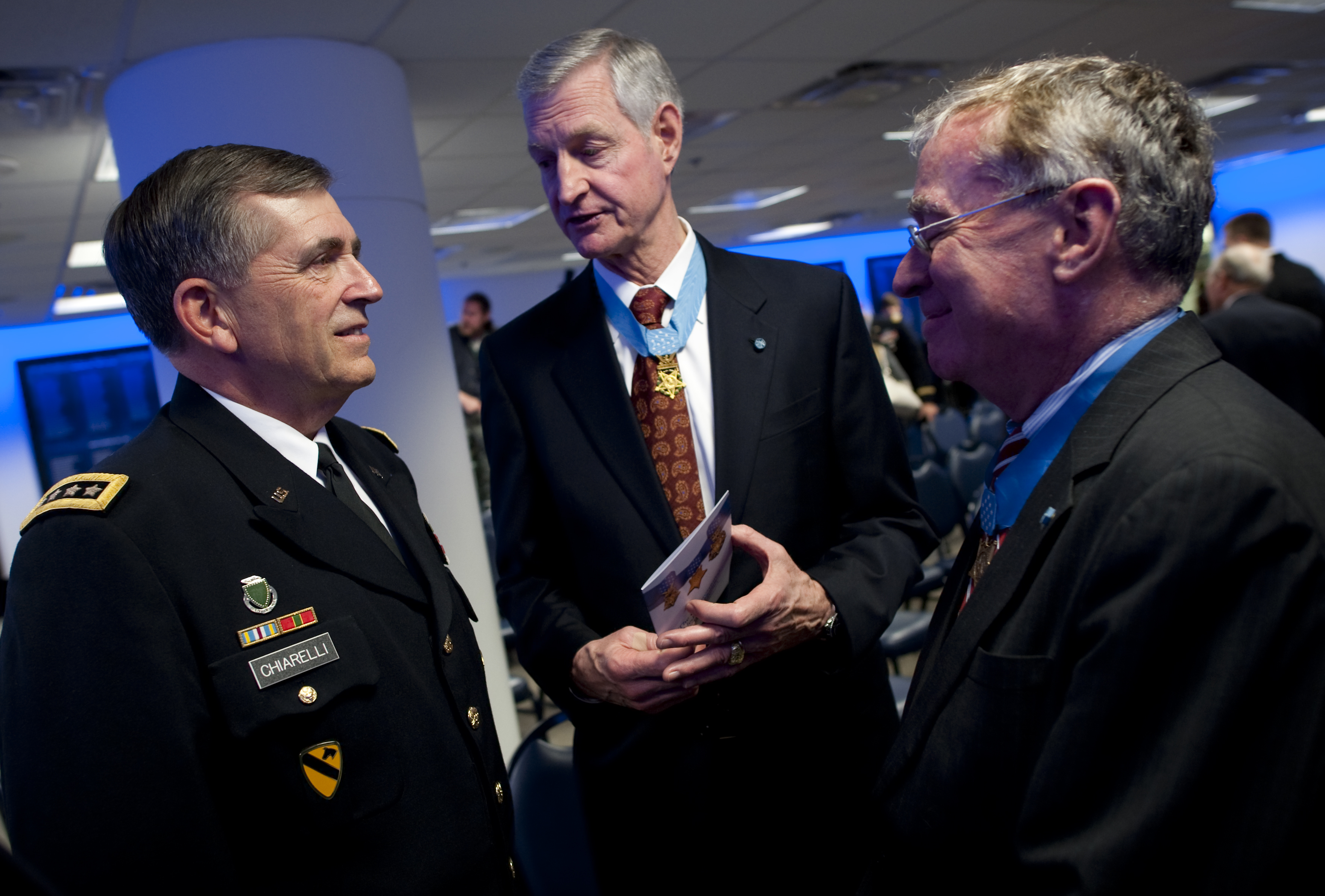
Foley in 2011, speaking with Lieutenant General Peter W. Chiarelli and fellow Medal of Honor recipient Thomas G. Kelley

Captain Foley's Medal of Honor citation reads:

For conspicuous gallantry and intrepidity in action at the risk of his life above and beyond the call of duty. Capt. Foley's company was ordered to extricate another company of the battalion. Moving through the dense jungle to aid the besieged unit, Company A encountered a strong enemy force occupying well concealed, defensive positions, and the company's leading element quickly sustained several casualties. Capt. Foley immediately ran forward to the scene of the most intense action to direct the company's efforts. Deploying 1 platoon on the flank, he led the other 2 platoons in an attack on the enemy in the face of intense fire. During this action both radio operators accompanying him were wounded. At grave risk to himself he defied the enemy's murderous fire, and helped the wounded operators to a position where they could receive medical care. As he moved forward again 1 of his machine gun crews was wounded. Seizing the weapon, he charged forward firing the machine gun, shouting orders and rallying his men, thus maintaining the momentum of the attack. Under increasingly heavy enemy fire he ordered his assistant to take cover and, alone, Capt. Foley continued to advance firing the machine gun until the wounded had been evacuated and the attack in this area could be resumed. When movement on the other flank was halted by the enemy's fanatical defense, Capt. Foley moved to personally direct this critical phase of the battle. Leading the renewed effort he was blown off his feet and wounded by an enemy grenade. Despite his painful wounds he refused medical aid and persevered in the forefront of the attack on the enemy redoubt. He led the assault on several enemy gun emplacements and, single-handedly, destroyed 3 such positions. His outstanding personal leadership under intense enemy fire during the fierce battle which lasted for several hours, inspired his men to heroic efforts and was instrumental in the ultimate success of the operation. Capt. Foley's magnificent courage, selfless concern for his men and professional skill reflect the utmost credit upon himself and the U.S. Army.

== See also ==
- List of Medal of Honor recipients for the Vietnam War
