= Dầu Tiếng district =

Dầu Tiếng District Huyện Dầu Tiếng
- District
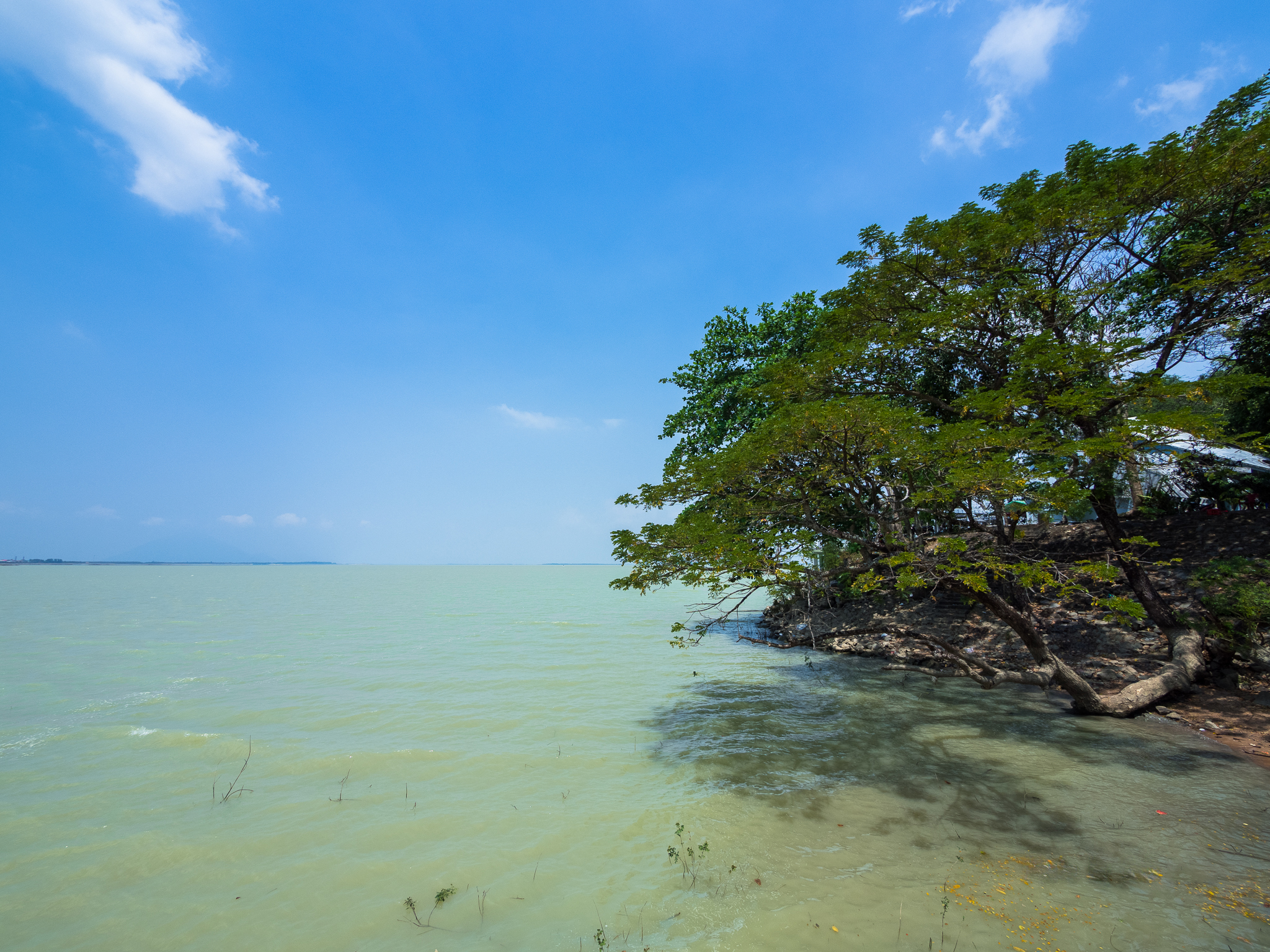
- Dầu Tiếng Reservoir
- Interactive map of Dầu Tiếng District
- Country: Vietnam
- Region: South East
- Province: Bình Dương
- Capital: Dầu Tiếng

Area
  - Total: 280 sq mi (720 km^{2})

Population (2003)
  - Total: 92,592
- Time zone: UTC+7 (Indochina Time)

Dầu Tiếng is a former rural district of Bình Dương province in the Southeast region of Vietnam. As of 2003, the district had a population of 92,592. The district covers an area of 720 km^{2}. The district capital lies at Dầu Tiếng township.

The district had a base with the same name during the war in Vietnam. Dầu Tiếng Base Camp played a prominent role in the fighting around northern III Corps. On 23 February 1969, the NVA launched a large scale attack on the base to coincide with their Tet 1969 campaign.
