= Dầu Tiếng, Ho Chi Minh City =

Dầu Tiếng Xã Dầu Tiếng Định Thành
- Commune
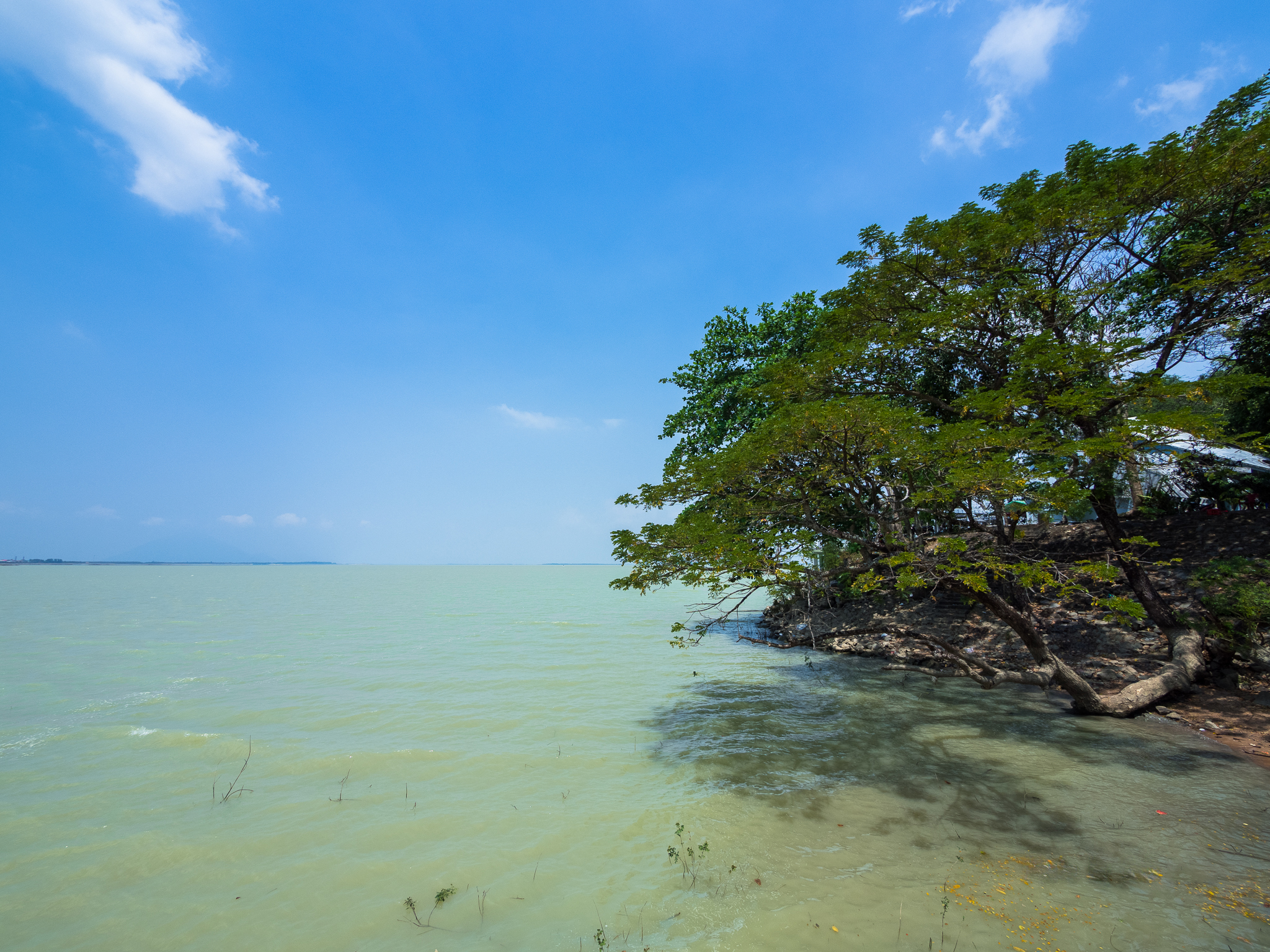
- Dầu Tiếng Reservoir
- Interactive map of Dầu Tiếng
- Coordinates: 11°16′00″N 106°22′00″E
- Country: Vietnam
- Municipality: Ho Chi Minh City
- Established: June 16, 2025

Area
  - Total: 70.54 sq mi (182.69 km^{2})

Population (2024)
  - Total: 39,056
  - Density: 553.70/sq mi (213.78/km^{2})
- Time zone: UTC+07:00 (Indochina Time)
- Administrative code: 25777

Dầu Tiếng (Vietnamese: Xã Dầu Tiếng) is a commune of Ho Chi Minh City, Vietnam. It is one of the 168 new wards, communes and special zones of the city following the reorganization in 2025.

== History ==
On June 16, 2025, the National Assembly Standing Committee issued Resolution No. 1685/NQ-UBTVQH15 on the arrangement of commune-level administrative units of Ho Chi Minh City in 2025 (effective from June 16, 2025). Accordingly, the entire land area and population of Dầu Tiếng township, Định An, Định Thành communes and part of Định Hiệp commune of the former Dầu Tiếng district will be integrated into a new commune named Dầu Tiếng (Clause 146, Article 1).
