= Bình Minh, Tây Ninh =

Bình Minh Phường Bình Minh
- Ward
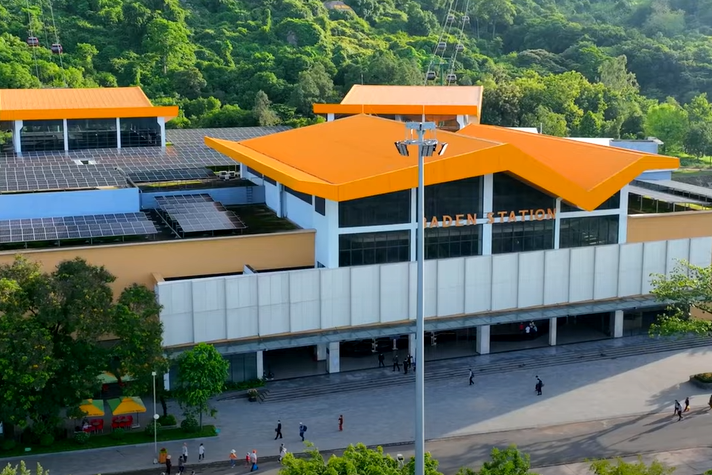
- Bà Đen cable-car station in Sun World Ba Den Mountain complex
- Interactive map of Bình Minh
- Country: Vietnam
- Province: Tây Ninh
- Establish: June 16, 2025

Area
  - Total: 105.35 km^{2} (40.68 sq mi)

Population
  - Total: 55,010 people
  - Density: 522.2/km^{2} (1,352/sq mi)
- Time zone: UTC+07:00

Bình Minh is a ward in Tây Ninh province, Vietnam. It is one of 96 wards and communes in the province following the 2025 Vietnamese administrative reform.

== Geography ==
Bình Minh is a ward in Tây Ninh province, located approximately 115km north of Long An ward. The ward has a geographical location:

- To the north, it borders Tân Phú commune and Trà Vong commune.
- To the east, it borders Dương Minh Châu commune.
- To the south, it borders Tân Ninh ward and Ninh Thạnh ward.
- To the west, it borders Châu Thành commune.

The Black Virgin Mountain, the highest mountain of Southern Vietnam, is located in the ward

== History ==
Before 2025, Bình Minh ward was formerly Ninh Sơn ward and the communes of Tân Bình, Bình Minh, Thạnh Tân (belonging to Tây Ninh provincial city) and parts of Phan commune and Suối Đá commune (belonging to Dương Minh Châu district) all belonged to Tây Ninh province.

On June 12, 2025, the National Assembly of Vietnam issued Resolution No. 202/2025/QH15 on the reorganization of provincial-level administrative units. Accordingly:

- Tây Ninh province was established by merging the entire area and population of Long An province and Tây Ninh province.

On June 16, 2025, the Standing Committee of the National Assembly of Vietnam issued Resolution No. 1682/NQ-UBTVQH15 on the reorganization of commune-level administrative units in Tây Ninh province. Accordingly:

- Bình Minh ward was established by merging the entire area and population of Ninh Sơn ward, Bình Minh commune, Tân Bình commune, and Thạnh Tân commune (formerly part of Tây Ninh provincial city) and the remaining parts of Suối Đá commune, Phan commune (formerly part of Dương Minh Châu district; excerpt from Clause 88, Article 1).
