= Châu Thành =

Châu Thành could be:

- Châu Thành: ward in Đồng Tháp province.
- Châu Thành: commune in Vĩnh Long province.
- Châu Thành: commune in Tây Ninh province.
- Châu Thành: commune in Cần Thơ municipality.
- Châu Thành: commune in An Giang province.

== Former places same name ==
=== Former district in Vietnam: ===
- Châu Thành: district in An Giang province
- Châu Thành: district in Bến Tre province
- Châu Thành: district in Đồng Tháp province
- Châu Thành: district in Hậu Giang province
- Châu Thành: district in Kiên Giang province
- Châu Thành: district in Long An province
- Châu Thành: district in Sóc Trăng province
- Châu Thành: district in Tây Ninh province
- Châu Thành: district in Tiền Giang province
- Châu Thành: district in Trà Vinh province.

=== Former commune-level town in Vietnam: ===
- Châu Thành: commune-level town in Châu Thành district, Bến Tre province (today part of Phú Túc commune, Vĩnh Long province).
- Châu Thành: commune-level town in Châu Thành district, Sóc Trăng province (today part of Phú Tâm commune, Cần Thơ municipality).
- Châu Thành: commune-level town in Châu Thành district, Tây Ninh province (today part of Châu Thành commune, Tây Ninh province).

=== Former commune in Vietnam: ===
- Châu Thành: commune in Quỳ Hợp district, Nghệ An province (today part of Châu Hồng commune, Nghệ An province).
