= Tân Biên (disambiguation) =

Tân Biên may refer to several places in Vietnam, including:

- Tân Biên, a commune of Tây Ninh province
- Tân Biên district, a former district of Tây Ninh province
- Tân Biên, Biên Hòa, a former ward of Biên Hòa
