= Dau Tieng Solar Power Project =

Group of photovoltaic power stations in Vietnam

Coordinates: 11.447089°N 106.235243°E

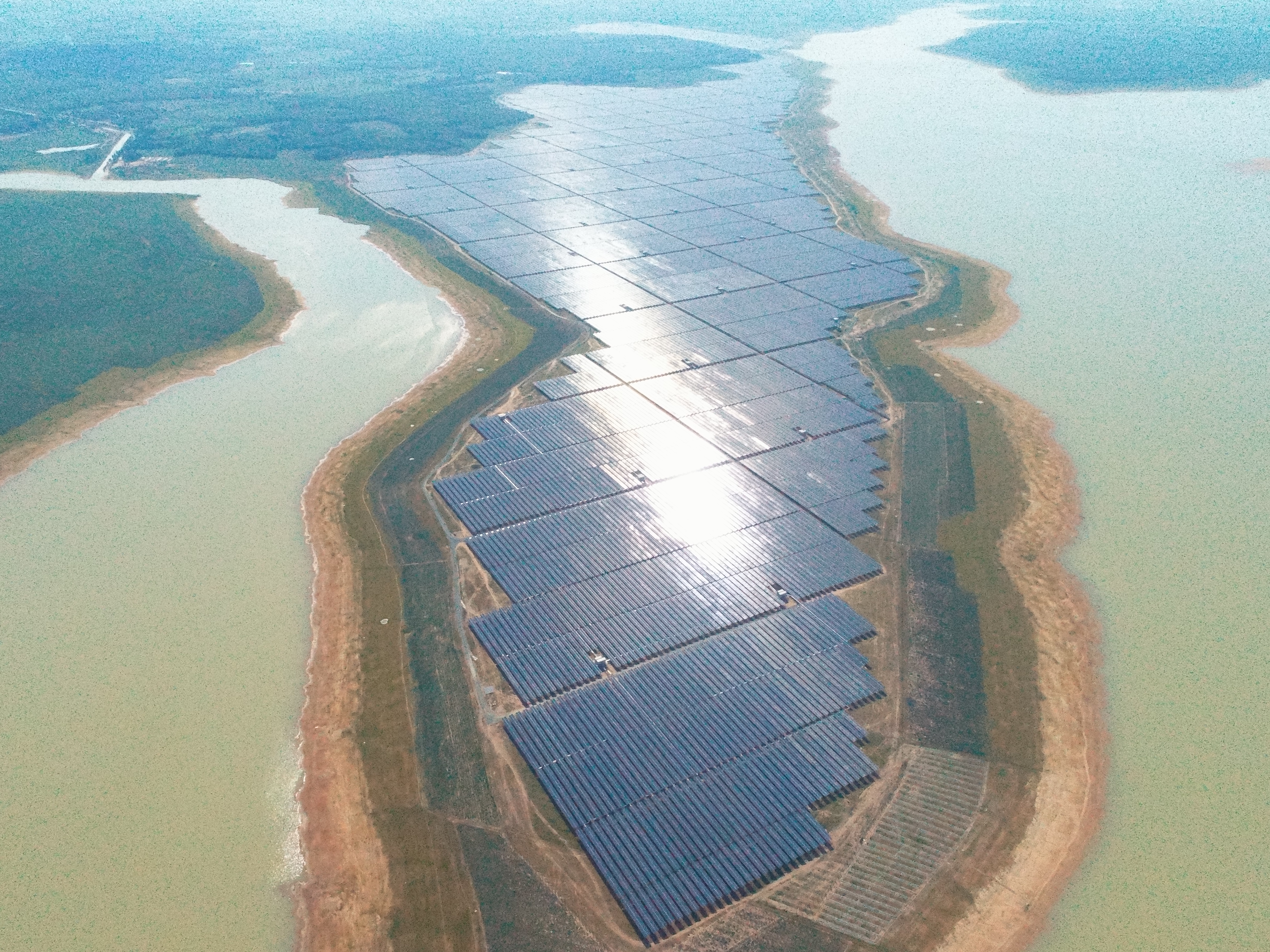
Bird's eye view of Dau Tieng Project

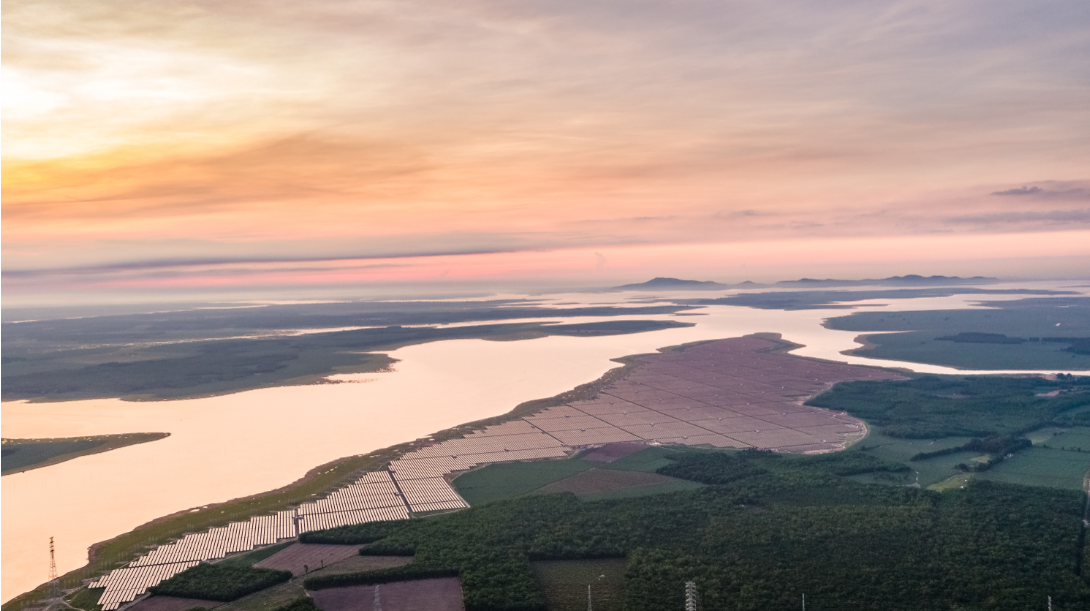
Bird's eye view of Dau Tieng Project after completion

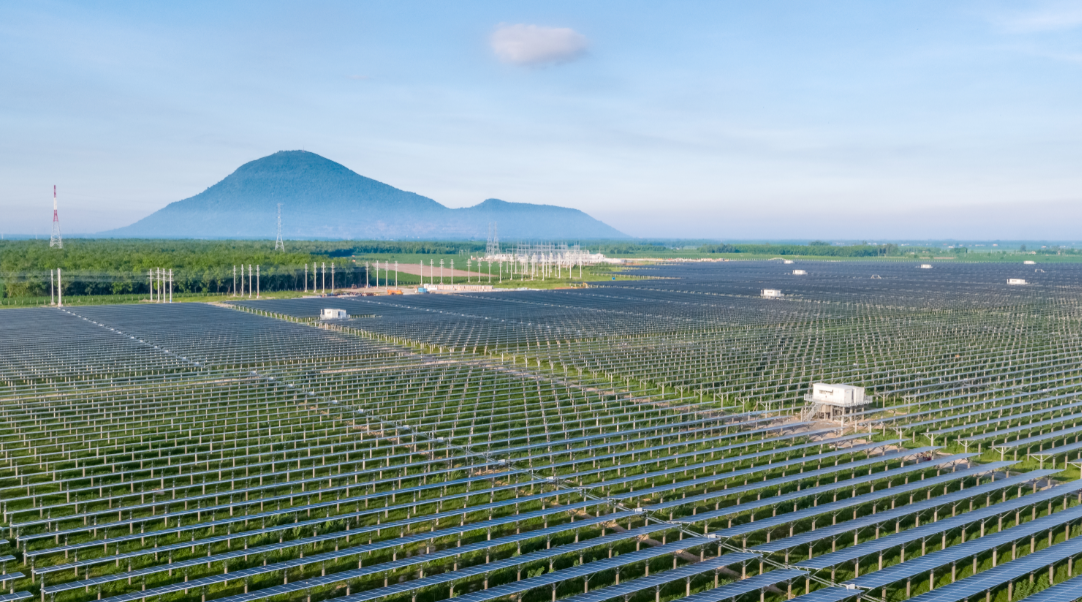
Bird's eye view of installation works at PV Arrays

Dau Tieng Solar Power Project is a photovoltaic power farm spread over a total area of 500 hectares (1,200 acres) which is located right next to Dau Tieng Lake, one of the largest shallow lakes in Vietnam, in Tan Chau and Duong Minh Chau Districts, Tan Hung, Tay Ninh Province, 100 km from Ho Chi Minh City, in the south of Vietnam.

== Project finance ==
Dau Tieng Project composes 3 projects which are Dau Tieng 1, Dau Tieng 2 and Dau Tieng 3 with a total generating capacity of 600 MWp / 500 MWac, which is the largest solar plant project in South East Asia. Dau Tieng 1, Dau Tieng 2 and part of Dau Tieng 3 have officially achieved Commercial Operation Date in June 2019. The project has the total amount of investment up to US$560 million by Dau Tieng Tay Ninh Energy JSC, a joint venture of B Grimm Power Company and Xuan Cau Corporation Limited. The project is implemented by Sinohydro Corporation Limited and Powerchina Huadong Engineering Corporation Limited, both of them are subsidiaries of POWERCHINA GROUP - an authorized technical consultant for administration of wind power and solar power generation projects in China.

== Overview on plant design ==
Dau Tieng Solar Power Plant is designed with solar photovoltaic technology which includes the main components of PV Panel array, Inverter, Monitoring/ Control System, Booster station system and Transmission system. The general layout of the Dau Tieng Solar Power Plant, specifically the distance between equipment rows, angle and configuration of equipment, direction of equipment installation, is designed and calculated efficiently to reduce the cost and maximum the productivity from the plant. The solar plant utilizes over 1.4 million PV modules, 220,000 pile foundations, 750 km of steel mounting structures, and almost 190 km of cables and 2,400 km of wires. Construction of the structures needs to mount the solar panels required 41,000 tonnes of galvanised steel. The entire solar park is also connected to a 220 kV Substation of Dau Tieng Tay Ninh Energy JSC. This project is supposed to give a solar resource of around 17.5 TWh of electricity totally during 25 years, which is sufficient to meet virtually the entire electricity demand of Tay Ninh City. It means an annual generation of 694000 MWh/yr may be possible.

== See also ==
- Renewable energy in Vietnam
- Solar power
