= Mỹ Quý =

Mỹ Quý Mỹ Quí
- Commune
- Interactive map of Mỹ Quý
- Country: Vietnam
- Province: Tây Ninh
- Establish: June 16, 2025

Area
  - Total: 132.98 km^{2} (51.34 sq mi)

Population (2025)
  - Total: 28,537 people
  - Density: 214.60/km^{2} (555.80/sq mi)
- Time zone: UTC+07:00

Mỹ Quý (also write is Mỹ Quí); is a commune in Tây Ninh province, Vietnam. It is one of 102 communes and wards in the province following the 2025 reorganization.

== Geography ==
Mỹ Quý commune is a commune located in the middle part of Tây Ninh province, approximately 50 km south of Tân Ninh ward and 70 km north of Long An ward. The commune has the following geographical location:

- To the north, it borders Phước Chỉ commune.
- To the west, it borders the Kingdom of Cambodia.
- To the south, it borders Đông Thành commune.
- To the east, it borders An Ninh commune and Hiệp Hòa commune (the boundary is the Vàm Cỏ Đông river).

== History ==
Prior to 2025, Mỹ Quý commune was formerly Mỹ Quý Đông, Mỹ Quý Tây, and Mỹ Thạnh Bắc communes belonging to Đức Huệ district, Long An province.

On June 12, 2025, the National Assembly of Vietnam issued Resolution No. 202/2025/QH15 on the reorganization of provincial-level administrative units. Accordingly:

- Tây Ninh province was established by merging the entire area and population of Long An province and Tây Ninh province.

On June 16, 2025, the Standing Committee of the National Assembly of Vietnam issued Resolution No. 1682/NQ-UBTVQH15 on the reorganization of commune-level administrative units in Tây Ninh province. Accordingly:

- Mỹ Quý commune was established by merging the entire area and population of Mỹ Quý Đông, Mỹ Quý Tây, and Mỹ Thạnh Bắc communes (formerly part of Đức Huệ district).
