= Châu Thành district, Tây Ninh =

Coordinates: 11°20′N 106°00′E

Châu Thành is a former district in the west of Tây Ninh province in the Southeast Vietnam.

The eastern side of the province borders Hòa Thành district and Tây Ninh City. The west borders Cambodia, the north abuts Tân Biên and the south adjoins Bến Cầu.

The Vàm Cỏ Đông River flows through the district. There is only one national highway passing through the edge of the district, which has the worst transport infrastructure of the province. National Road 22B runs through the commune of Đồng Khởi.

There is a sizable minority of Khmer people living in the area, and they now interact with the ethnic Vietnamese majority more than in the past, when communities were more segregated. The Khmers are mostly farmers who live on the western edge of the district near the Cambodian border.

There are many predominantly Catholic refugees from northern Vietnam who moved south in Operation Passage to Freedom in 1954–55 after the partition of Vietnam. They are mostly concentrated in the commune of Thái Bình—whole villages were often transplanted en masse into the south.

There are many unexploited farming plains in the area, more so than in the rest of the province, due to a lack of irrigation infrastructure.

Apart from the district seat itself, the district comprises the following communes.

- Phước Vinh
- Hảo Đước
- Đồng Khởi
- Biên Giới
- Hòa Thạnh
- Hòa Hội
- Trí Bình
- Thái Bình
- Thành Long
- Ninh Điền
- Thanh Điền
- Long Vĩnh
- An Cơ
- An Bình
