= Dương Minh Châu =

Dương Minh Châu (1912–1947) is a Vietnamese martyr who served as Chairman of the Resistance’s Administrative Committee of the Tây Ninh province. Several places in Vietnam are named after him, including:

- Dương Minh Châu, Tây Ninh: a commune and previously a township of Tây Ninh province
- Dương Minh Châu district: a former district, dissolved in 2025 as part of the 2025 Vietnamese administrative reform
- Duong Minh Chau War Zone, a geographic area of Tây Ninh province during the First Indochina War and the Vietnam War
