= Lò Gò–Xa Mát National Park =

National park in Vietnam

- Vườn quốc gia Lò Gò–Xa Mát
- IUCN category II (national park)
- Location within Vietnam
- Location: Tân Biên, Tây Ninh, Vietnam
- Nearest city: Ho Chi Minh City, Vietnam
- Coordinates: 11°24′30″N 106°00′30″E
- Area: 300.22 km^{2} (115.92 sq mi)
- Established: 2002
- Governing body: People's Committee Tây Ninh Province

Lò Gò–Xa Mát National Park (Vietnamese: Vườn quốc gia Lò Gò–Xa Mát) is a national park in the Southeast region of Vietnam, approximately 30 kilometres (19 mi) from the ward of Tân Ninh. It was established by upgrading the status of the former Lò Gò–Xa Mát Nature Reserve. After receiving national park status in 2002, the park was expanded in 2020 to cover an area of 30,022 hectares (115.92 sq mi).

It is the largest single forested area in Tây Ninh province, and 177 species of birds and ten mammal species have been confirmed to live in the park boundaries. Biomes include broadleaf tropical forests, and seasonally flooded grasslands.
