= Tân Biên =

- Ward
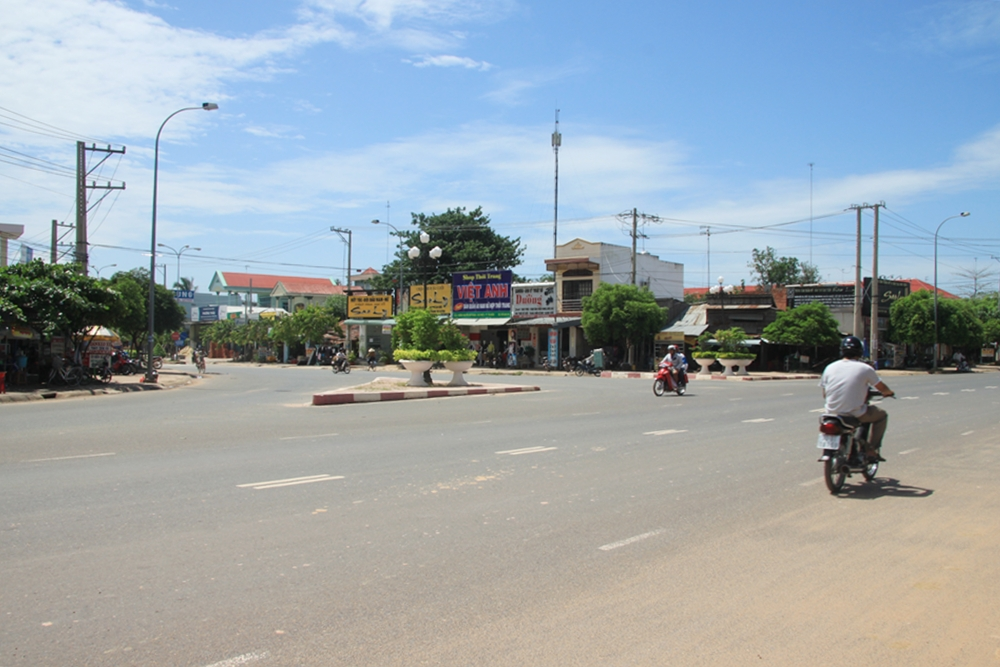
- Interactive map of Tân Biên
- Coordinates: 11.54455061473376°N 106.01229184110134°E
- Country: Vietnam
- Province: Tây Ninh
- Region: Southeast
- Established: 1992 (Tân Biên township); 2025 (Tân Biên commune)
- Seat: 99 Nguyễn Chí Thanh, Ấp Tân Biên

Area
  - Total: 242.31 km^{2} (93.56 sq mi)

Population (2025)
  - Total: 36,744
  - Density: 151/km^{2} (390/sq mi)
- Website: tanbien.tayninh.gov.vn

Tân Biên is a ward in Tây Ninh province, Vietnam. The ward inherited its name from the former Tân Biên district.

On 12 June 2025, the National Assembly of Vietnam adopted Resolution No. 202/2025/QH15 on the reorganization of provincial-level administrative units. Under the resolution, the entire area and population of Long An province and Tây Ninh province were reorganized into a new province named Tây Ninh.

On 16 June 2025, the Standing Committee of the National Assembly of Vietnam adopted Resolution No. 1682/NQ-UBTVQH15 on the reorganization of commune-level administrative units in Tây Ninh province in 2025. Under the resolution, the entire area and population of Tân Biên township, Thạnh Tây commune, and Tân Bình commune in the former Tân Biên district were consolidated to form a new commune named Tân Biên.
