= Lộc Ninh, Tây Ninh =

Commune in Tây Ninh Province, Vietnam

Coordinates: 11.2631°N 106.3339°E

Lộc Ninh is a commune of Tây Ninh Province, Vietnam. The area of the commune is 34,26 km^{2}, and the population in 1999 was 4,802 people.

On 12 June 2025, the 15th National Assembly adopted Resolution No. 202/2025/QH15 on the reorganization of provincial-level administrative units. Under the resolution, the entire area and population of Long An province and Tây Ninh province were merged to form a new province named Tây Ninh.

On 16 June 2025, the Standing Committee of the National Assembly of Vietnam issued Resolution No. 1682/NQ-UBTVQH15 on the arrangement of commune-level administrative units in Tây Ninh province in 2025. Under the resolution, the entire area and population of Bến Củi and Lộc Ninh communes, together with part of Phước Minh commune, formerly part of Dương Minh Châu district, were merged to form a new commune named Lộc Ninh.

== Vietnam War ==
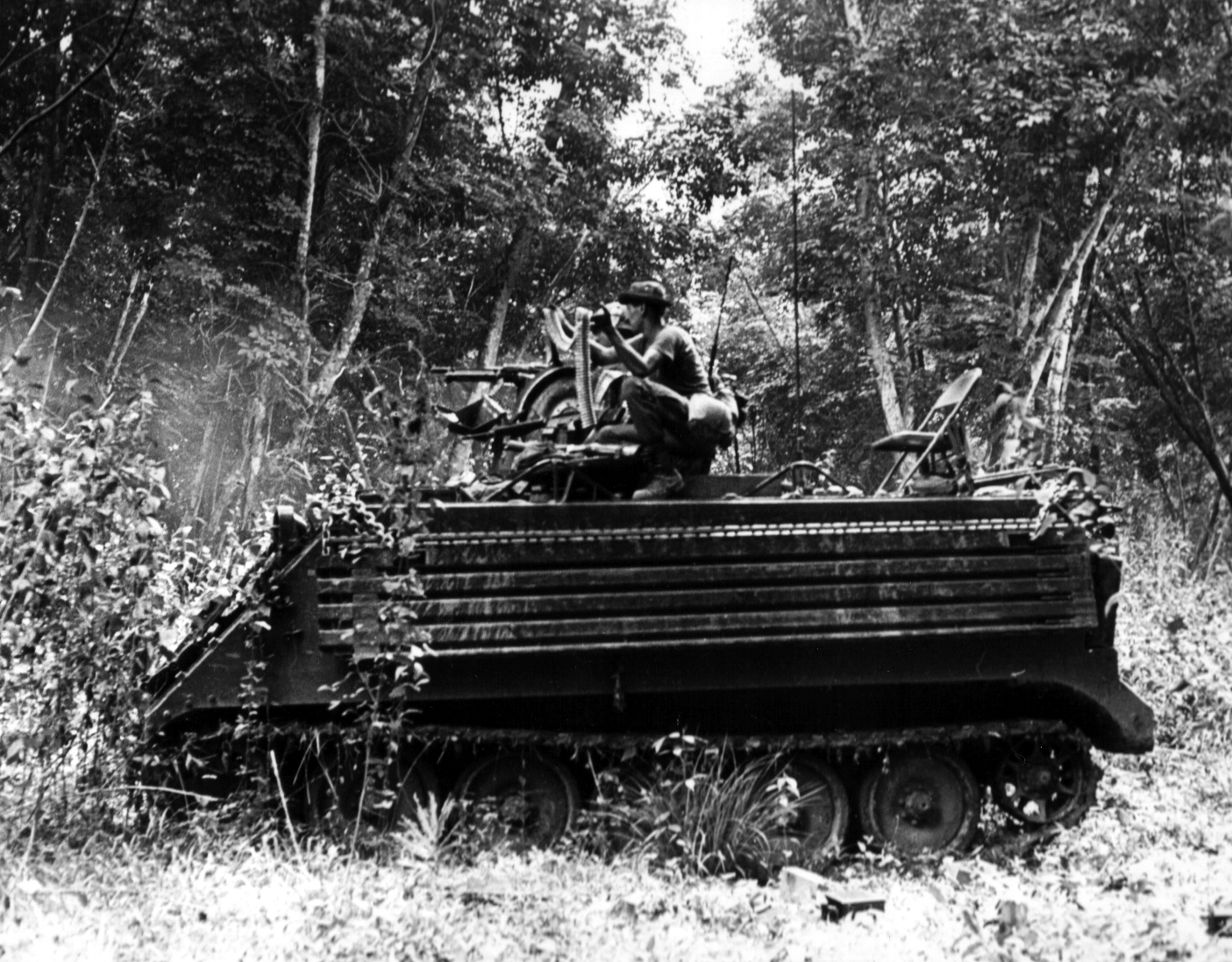
An American M113 armoured personnel carrier in action at Bến Củi rubber plantation.

Bến Củi was the site of a rubber plantation (Nông trường cao su Bến Củi) that was part of the Michelin Rubber Plantation near Dầu Tiếng, Republic of Vietnam. During the Vietnam War, Ben Cui and other sections of the Michelin rubber plantation were the scene of intense fighting between United States forces and the North Vietnamese Army (NVA) and Viet Cong forces.

Staff Sergeant Marvin "Rex" Young, Company C, 1st Battalion (Mechanized), 5th Infantry Regiment, 25th Infantry Division posthumously received the Medal of Honor, in recognition of the repeated efforts he made to save the lives of his comrades near Ben Cui on August 21, 1968. The 1st Battalion, 5th Infantry Regiment earned the Presidential Unit Citation for the actions from August 18 to September 20, 1968.

The fighting in the Bến Củi rubber plantation is sometimes referred to as the Third Offensive, in reference to the third wave of massed North Vietnamese troops after the Tet Offensive. The Tet and subsequent offensives marked a major shift from the small hit-and-run sniper and ambush that dominated during the Vietnam War to a more massive display of force and higher numbers of casualties.

Some of the veterans of the combat in the Bến Củi and other segments of the Michelin rubber plantation believe that heavier U.S. casualties were sustained because the U.S. Army had an informal agreement with the French Government to not use artillery or air strikes in the rubber plantations, to avoid costly damage to the rubber trees. However, the Combat After Action Reports from the Bến Củi engagement of 21 August 1968 indicate that both artillery and air support were used.
