= Tân Đông =

Tân Đông may refer to one of the commune-level administrative units in Vietnam:

- Tân Đông, Đồng Tháp, commune in Đồng Tháp province
- Tân Đông, Tây Ninh, commune in Tây Ninh province
- Tân Đông Hiệp, ward in Hồ Chí Minh city
