= Tân Châu district =

Coordinates: 11.5492°N 106.1731°E

Tân Châu district Huyện Tân Châu
- District
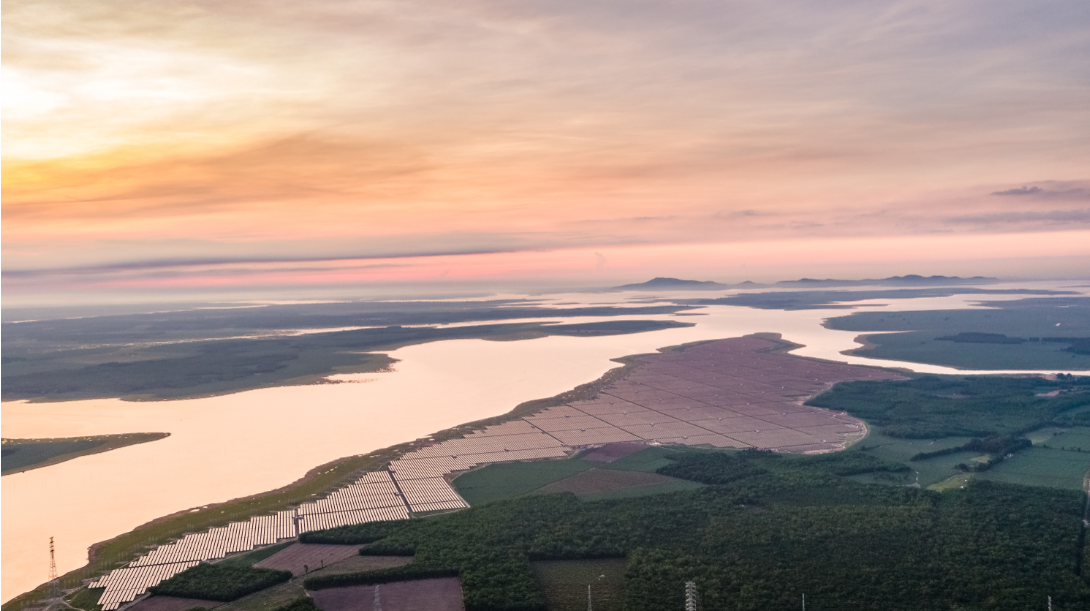
- Dau Tieng Solar Power Project
- Interactive map of Tân Châu district
- Country: Vietnam
- Region: South East
- Province: Tây Ninh
- Capital: Tân Châu
- Time zone: UTC+07:00 (Indochina Time)

Tân Châu is a former rural district (huyện) in the northern part of Tây Ninh province in the Southeast region of Vietnam. As of 2003 the district had a population of 106,264. The district covers an area of 1,099 km^{2}. The district capital lies at Tân Châu. It is the largest district in the province, accounting for around 25% of the area.

The predominant soil in the area is grey. This type of soil is prone to erosion and being swept away by water, and cannot be used in dykes, but it is suitable for rubber plantations.

The district has a climate typical of southern Vietnam, with no winter, and a distinct dry and monsoon season. The average maximum temperature in the district is 27 Celsius and the minimum around 4 Celsius.

The Saigon River runs along the eastern boundary of the district, and is also the division between Tay Ninh and the provinces of Bình Dương and Bình Phước to the east. Several waterfalls and springs, the Ngô, Dây among others, are in the district and flow into the Saigon River.

The district has several types of minerals suitable for use as building materials in cements and bricks.

The district consists of the township of Tân Châu and the communes of Tân Hà, Tân Đông, Tân Hội, Tân Hòa, Suối Ngô, Suối Dây, Tân Hiệp, Thạnh Đông, Tân Thành, Tân Phú and Tân Hưng.

Tân Châu borders Tân Biên district to the west, Tây Ninh city to the southwest, Dương Minh Châu district to the south, and Hớn Quản district to the east.

The district was formed by splitting out parts of Dương Minh Châu District and Tân Biên District.

The main economic activities in the province are the production of rubber, sugarcane and noodles. The Nước Trong (lit Clear Water) sugar processing plant is one of the biggest in the province, and processes around 1,000 tons of sugarcane. Forestry is also seen as a potentially lucrative activity in the district.
