= Tân Ninh =

- Ward
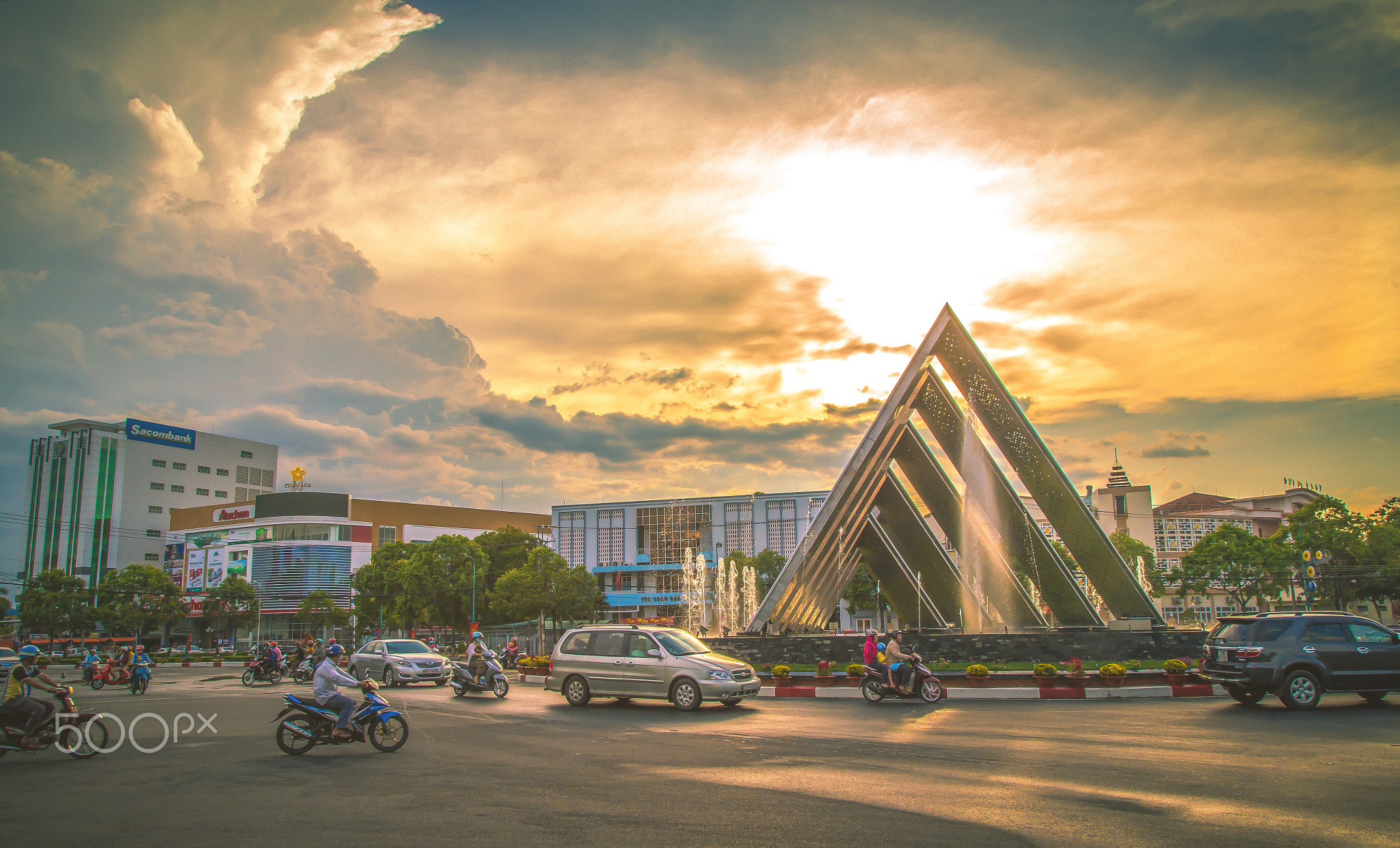
- Tây Ninh Central Roundabout
- Interactive map of Tân Ninh
- Country: Vietnam
- Province: Tây Ninh
- Establish: June 16, 2025

Area
  - Total: 21.35 km^{2} (8.24 sq mi)

Population (2025)
  - Total: 89,360
  - Density: 4,185/km^{2} (10,840/sq mi)
- Time zone: UTC+07:00

Tân Ninh is a ward in Tây Ninh province, Vietnam. It is one of 96 communes and wards in the province following the 2025 reorganization.

== Geography ==
Tân Ninh is a ward located in the northern of Tây Ninh province, it is about 115 km away to the north of Long An ward, and about 100 km away to the northwest of Saigon, Ho Chi Minh City.

The ward is the commercial and cultural center of Northern Tây Ninh, it was part of the central Tây Ninh City and part of Châu Thành district formerly, Tân Ninh ward has a geographical location:

- To the east, it borders Ninh Thạnh ward and Long Hoa ward.
- To the west, it borders Châu Thành commune.
- To the south, it borders Thanh Điền ward.
- To the north, it borders Bình Minh ward.

== History ==
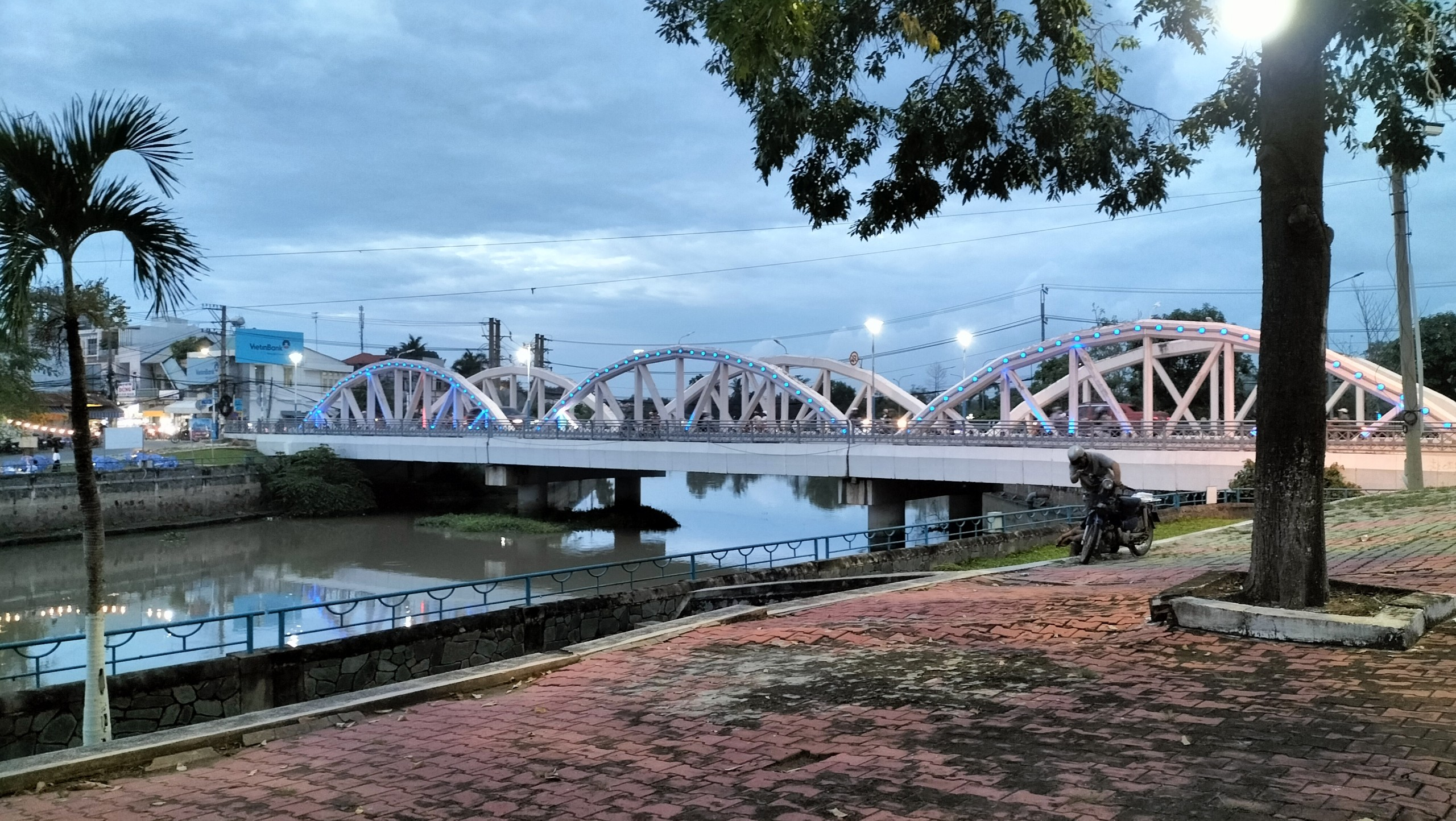
Quan Bridge across Tây Ninh Canal, on the main east–west axis of the ward

Prior to 2025, Tân Ninh ward comprised wards 1, 2, 3, IV, and Hiệp Ninh (belonging to Tây Ninh provincial city) and a part of Thái Bình commune (belonging to Châu Thành district), all belonging to Tây Ninh province.

On June 12, 2025, the National Assembly of Vietnam issued Resolution No. 202/2025/QH15 on the reorganization of provincial-level administrative units. Accordingly:

- Tây Ninh province was established by merging the entire area and population of Long An province and Tây Ninh province.

On June 16, 2025, the Standing Committee of the National Assembly of Vietnam issued Resolution No. 1682/NQ-UBTVQH15 on the reorganization of commune-level administrative units in Tây Ninh province. Accordingly:

- Tân Ninh ward was established by merging the entire area and population of wards 1, 2, 3, IV, and Hiệp Ninh (formerly part of Tây Ninh provincial city) and a part of Thái Bình commune (formerly part of Châu Thành district).
