= Tân Châu, Tây Ninh =

Tân Châu Phường Tân Châu Prek Klok
- Ward
- Interactive map of Tân Châu
- Coordinates: 11°33′13″N 106°09′42″E
- Country: Vietnam
- Province: Tây Ninh province
- Established: June 16, 2025

Area
  - Total: 21.15 sq mi (54.77 km^{2})

Population (2024)
  - Total: 24,072
  - Density: 1,138/sq mi (439.5/km^{2})
- Time zone: UTC+07:00 (Indochina Time)
- Administrative code: 25516

Tân Châu (Vietnamese: Phường Tân Châu) is a ward of Tây Ninh province, Vietnam. It is one of the 96 new wards, communes and special zones of the province following the reorganization in 2025.

During the Vietnam War, Tân Châu was known as Prek Klok and was the site of the Battles of Prek Klok I and Prek Klok II during Operation Junction City in 1967.

== History ==
On June 16, 2025, the National Assembly Standing Committee issued Resolution No. 1682/NQ-UBTVQH15 on the arrangement of commune-level administrative units of Tây Ninh province in 2025 (effective from June 16, 2025). Accordingly, the entire land area and population of Tân Châu township, Thạnh Đông commune and part of Tân Phú, Suối Dây communes of the former Tân Châu district will be integrated into a new commune named Tân Châu (Clause 66, Article 1).
