= Dương Minh Châu district =

Coordinates: 11.367°N 106.250°E

Dương Minh Châu district Huyện Dương Minh Châu
- District
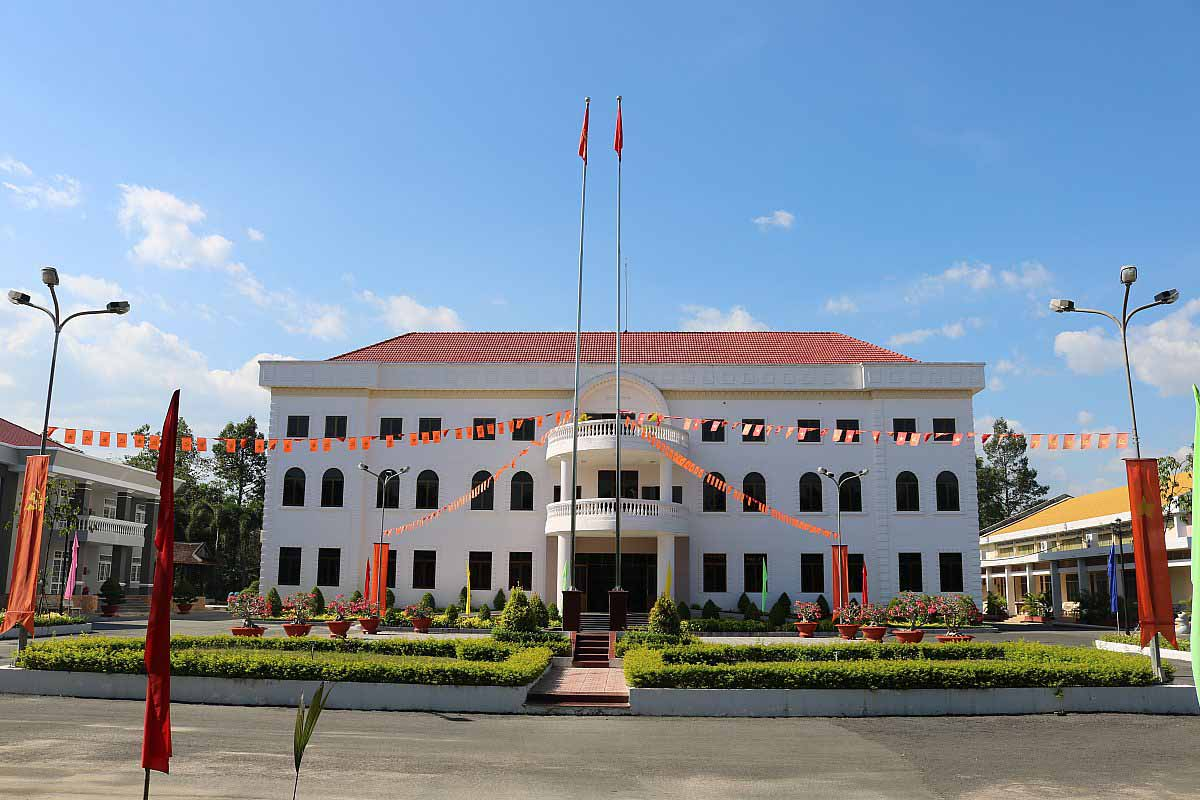
- People's committee office in Dương Minh Châu
- Interactive map of Dương Minh Châu district
- Country: Vietnam
- Region: Southeast
- Province: Tây Ninh
- Capital: Dương Minh Châu

Area
  - Total: 157 sq mi (407 km^{2})

Population (2018)
  - Total: 128,061
- Time zone: UTC+7 (UTC + 7)

Dương Minh Châu is a former rural district of Tây Ninh province in the Southeast region of Vietnam. As of 2003 the district had a population of 99,230. The district covers an area of 407 km^{2} (157 sq mi). The district capital lies at Dương Minh Châu. It is the third largest district in the province after Tân Biên and Tân Châu districts. The majority of the population are ethnic Vietnamese.

== Geography ==
The district is bordered to the west by Tây Ninh City, to the north by Tân Châu, to the south by Gò Dầu and to the east by the provinces of Bình Dương and Bình Phước.

== Tourism ==
A tourist attraction in the area is the Dầu Tiếng Lake, an artificial body of water. It is the largest freshwater lake in the country and was built in the 1980s. It lies on the border of the district with Tân Châu, Bình Phước and Bình Dương, with most of the area being in Dương Minh Châu.

== Divisions ==
Apart from the district seat of the same name, the district comprises the following communes:

- Bàu Năng
- Phước Minh
- Phước Ninh
- Chà Là
- Truông Mít
- Cầu Khởi
- Phan
- Suối Đá
- Lộc Ninh
- Bến Củi
