= Tân Đông, Tây Ninh =

Village in Tây Ninh Province, Vietnam

Tân Đông Xã Tân Đông Katum
- Commune
- Interactive map of Tân Đông
- Coordinates: 11°40′46″N 106°14′34″E
- Country: Vietnam
- Province: Tây Ninh province
- Established: June 16, 2025

Area
  - Total: 51.86 sq mi (134.32 km^{2})

Population (2024)
  - Total: 27,582
  - Density: 531.84/sq mi (205.35/km^{2})
- Time zone: UTC+07:00 (Indochina Time)
- Administrative code: 25522

Tân Đông (Vietnamese: Xã Tân Đông) is a commune of Tây Ninh province, Vietnam. It is one of the 96 new wards, communes and special zones of the province following the reorganization in 2025.

Tân Đông is in northern Tây Ninh province, right next to the Cambodia–Vietnam border. The commune's administrative center is located at the village of Katum (Vietnamese: Kà Tum).

== History ==
During the Vietnam War, the U.S. Army and Army of the Republic of Vietnam operated an air base at Katum Camp. Katum was also later included in reports on re-education camps following the war.

On June 16, 2025, the National Assembly Standing Committee issued Resolution No. 1682/NQ-UBTVQH15 on the arrangement of commune-level administrative units of Tây Ninh province in 2025 (effective from June 16, 2025). Accordingly, the entire land area and population of Tân Đông and Tân Hà communes of the former Tân Châu district will be integrated into a new commune named Tân Đông (Clause 65, Article 1).
