= Bến Cầu =

Bến Cầu Phường Bến Cầu
- Ward
- Location within Vietnam
- Coordinates: 11°6′39″N 106°10′46″E
- Country: Vietnam
- Region: Southeast
- Province: Tây Ninh
- Time zone: UTC+7 (UTC + 7)

Bến Cầu is a ward (phường) of Tây Ninh Province, Vietnam.
