= Thủ Thừa =

Thủ Thừa Xã Thủ Thừa
- Commune
- Thủ Thừa commune
- Location within Vietnam
- Coordinates: 10°36′11″N 106°24′17″E
- Country: Vietnam
- Region: Mekong Delta
- Province: Tây Ninh
- Time zone: UTC+7 (UTC + 7)

Thủ Thừa is a commune (xã) of Tây Ninh Province, Vietnam.
