= Tân Biên district =

Coordinates: 11.583°N 106.000°E

Tân Biên District Huyện Tân Biên
- District
- Interactive map of Tân Biên District
- Country: Vietnam
- Region: Southeast
- Province: Tây Ninh
- Capital: Tân Biên
- Time zone: UTC+07:00 (Indochina Time)

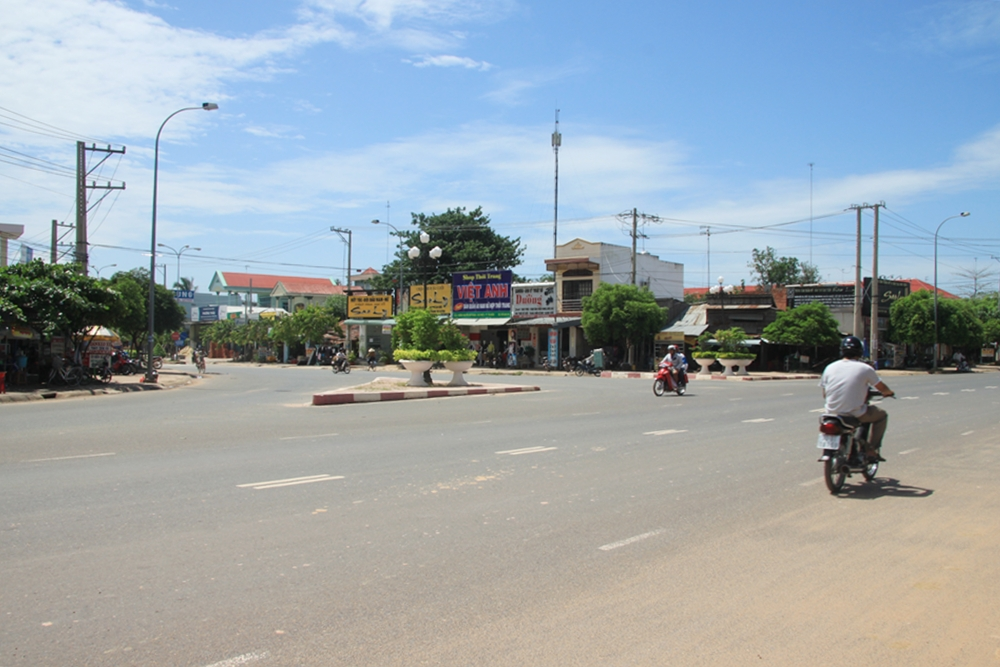
Intersection at Cần Đăng in Tân Biên town, Tây Ninh province, Vietnam

Tân Biên is a former rural district of Tây Ninh province in the Southeast region of Vietnam.

As of 2003 the district had a population of 82,641. The district covers an area of 853 km^{2} (329 sq mi). The district capital lies at Tân Biên. Aside from the Vietnamese majority, there are sizable minorities of ethnic Khmer and Cham people.

The name of the district literally means New Border; the area was part of the Khmer Empire until the 17th and 18th century when the southwards expansion of Vietnam under the Nguyễn lords brought it under the control of the Vietnamese people.

The district is bordered to the east by Tân Châu, to the west and north by Cambodia, to the north by Châu Thành and Tây Ninh city.

Production of rubber and sugarcane are the main economic activities in the district. Forestry is also a growing industry in the district, as it is in the entire province.

The area is impoverished and the GDP per capita is under 500USD.

Currently there is a concerted drive to encourage economic development in the district seat, in the hope that it will become an economic hub.

Tourist sites include the war history site Tua Hai, the Lò Gò–Xa Mát National Park. The Ministry of Culture and Information has declared parts of the district and neighbouring Tan Chau as historic sites of interest, claiming that the COSVN was located there during the Vietnam War.

The district consists of the township of Tân Biên and the following communes

- Tân Bình
- Tân Lập
- Thạnh Tây
- Hòa Hiệp
- Mỏ Công
- Tân Phong
- Trà Vong
- Thạnh Bình
- Thạnh Bắc
