= Châu Thành district, Sóc Trăng =

Châu Thành district Huyện Châu Thành
- District
- Interactive map of Châu Thành district
- Country: Vietnam
- Region: Mekong Delta
- Province: Sóc Trăng
- Capital: Châu Thành town

Area
  - Total: 91.245 sq mi (236.324 km^{2})

Population (2008)
  - Total: 103,518
- Time zone: UTC+7 (UTC + 7)

Châu Thành is a rural district (huyện) of Sóc Trăng province in the Mekong River Delta region of Vietnam. It's a new district and established in 2008. Many district in other southern Vietnam province also named "Châu Thành". As of 2008 the district had a population of 236,324. The district covers an area of 103.518 km^{2} (39.969 sq mi). The district capital is Châu Thành Town.

== Towns and communes ==
Chau Thanh district has 7 commune-level administrative units. Including 1 town and 6 communes.

- Châu Thành Town
- An Hiệp
- An Ninh
- Hồ Đắc Kiện
- Phú Tâm
- Phú Tân
- Thiện Mỹ
- Thuận Hoà
