= Black Virgin Mountain =

Mountain in Vietnam

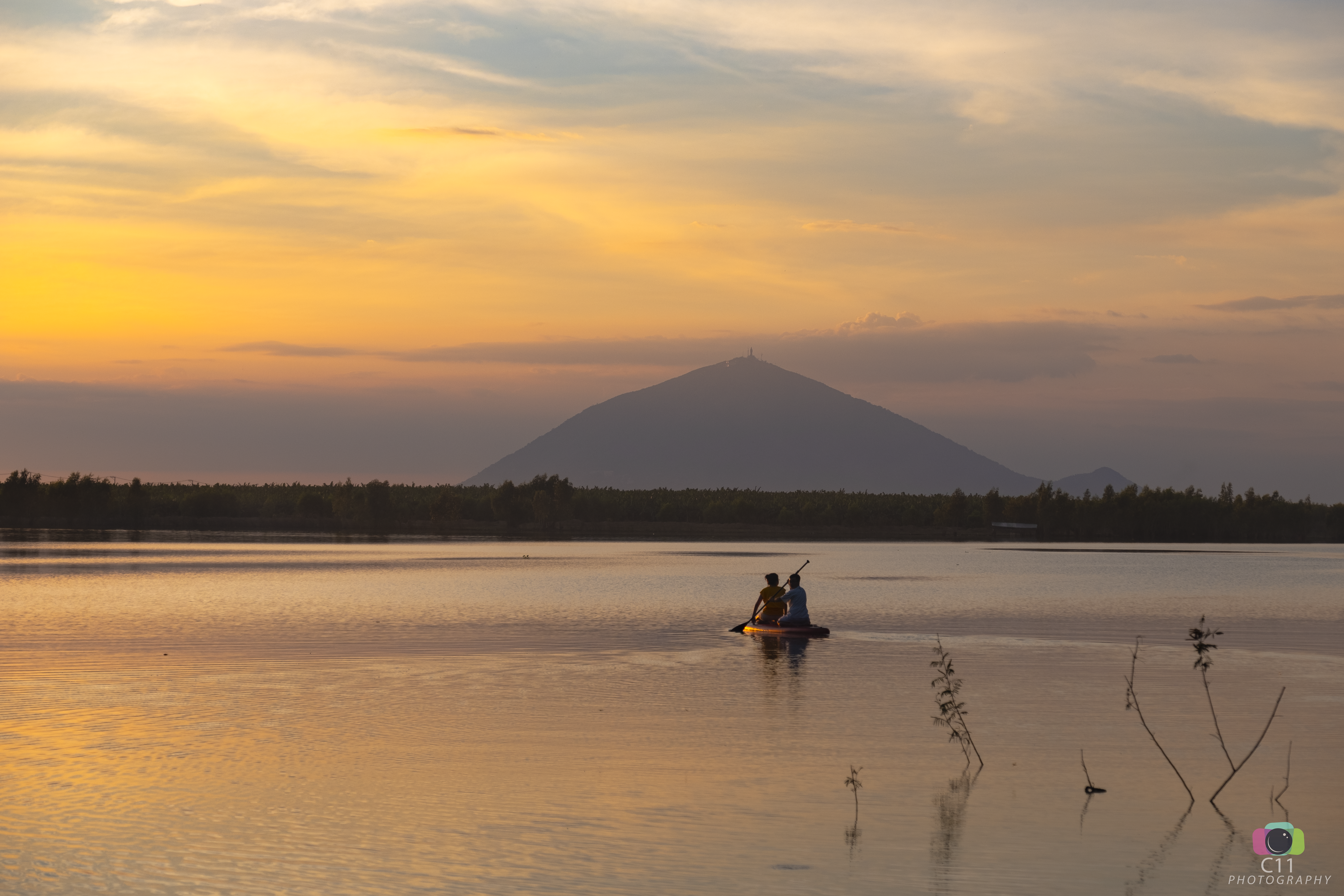
- Black Virgin Mountain viewed from Dầu Tiếng Reservoir

Highest point
- Elevation: 996 m (3,268 ft)
- Coordinates: 11°22′N 106°10′E

Naming
- Native name: Núi Bà Đen (Vietnamese)

Geography
- Location within Vietnam
- Location: Tây Ninh City, Tây Ninh Province, Vietnam

Geology
- Mountain type: Extinct volcano

Climbing
- Easiest route: Hiking and aerial tramway

Black Virgin Mountain (Vietnamese: Núi Bà Đen, lit. 'Black Lady Mountain') is an extinct volcano in Tây Ninh province, Vietnam.

According to Gia Định Thành Thông Chí, the original name of Bà Đen Mountain was Bà Dinh. However, local elders believe the original name was Một Mountain. Around the mid-18th century, the name Bà Đênh Mountain began to appear, which over time was gradually altered to Bà Đen Mountain. Some people also call it Điện Bà Mountain. During the Vietnam War, the area surrounding the mountain was a hotspot, as it marked the end point of the Ho Chi Minh Trail and was located just a few kilometers west of the Cambodian border.

This area is actually a cluster of three adjacent mountains: Bà Đen Mountain (also known simply as Bà Mountain), Heo Mountain, and Phụng Mountain, covering a total area of 24 km². The Ba Den Mountain complex was recognized by the Ministry of Culture (now the Ministry of Culture, Sports, and Tourism) as a national historical and scenic relic on January 21, 1989.

== Geography and fauna ==
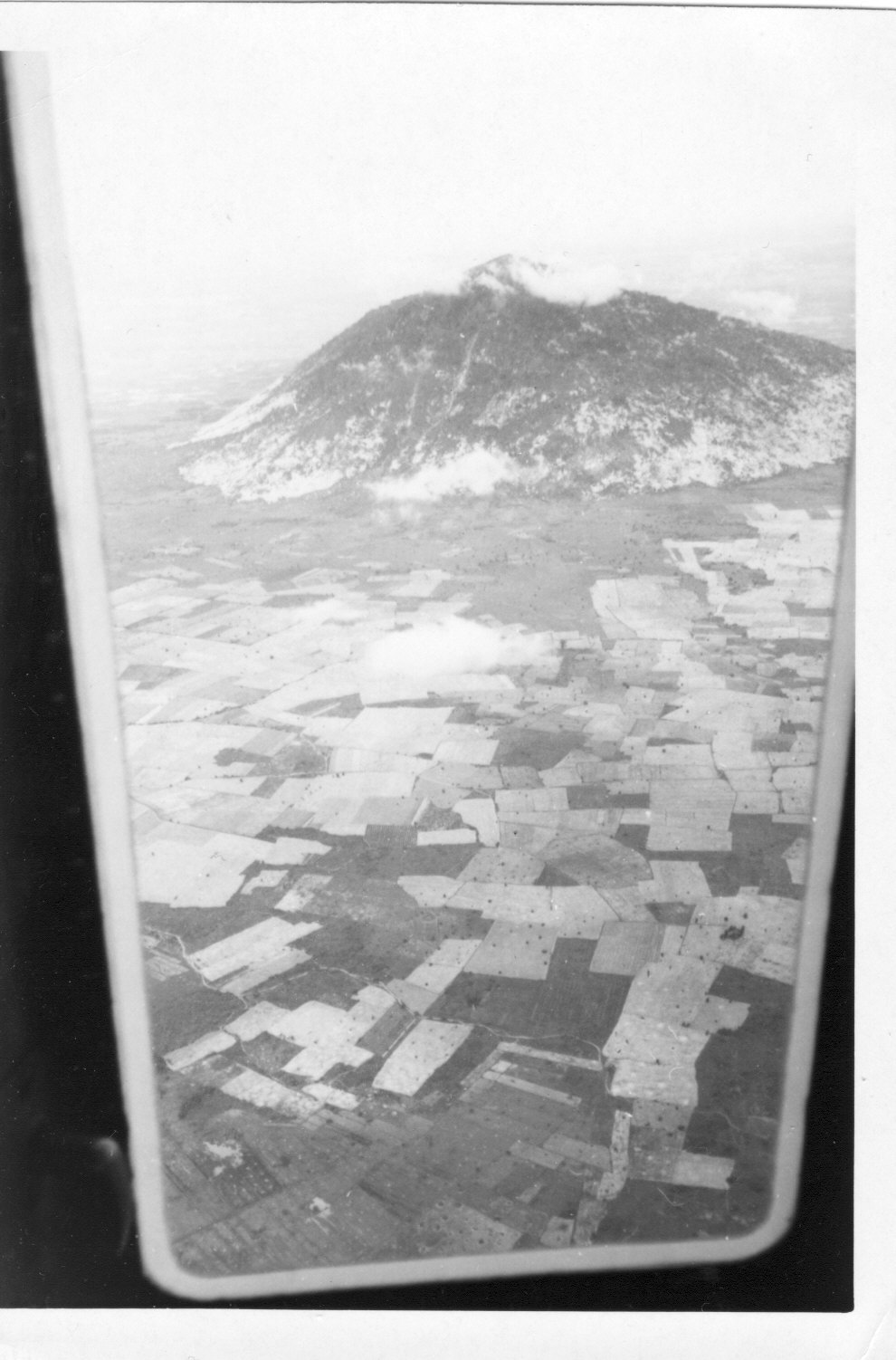
Núi Bà Đen aerial view, 1971

At 996 metres (3,268 ft), the extinct volcano rises from the flat Mekong Delta jungle and farmland. The mountain is almost a perfect cinder cone with a saddle and a slight bulge on her northwest side. The mountain is honeycombed with caves and is covered in many large basalt boulders. The mountain is located approximately 10 km northeast of Tây Ninh and 96 km northwest of Ho Chi Minh City.

A species of gecko, Gekko badenii, is named for the mountain and is endemic to the mountain.

== History ==
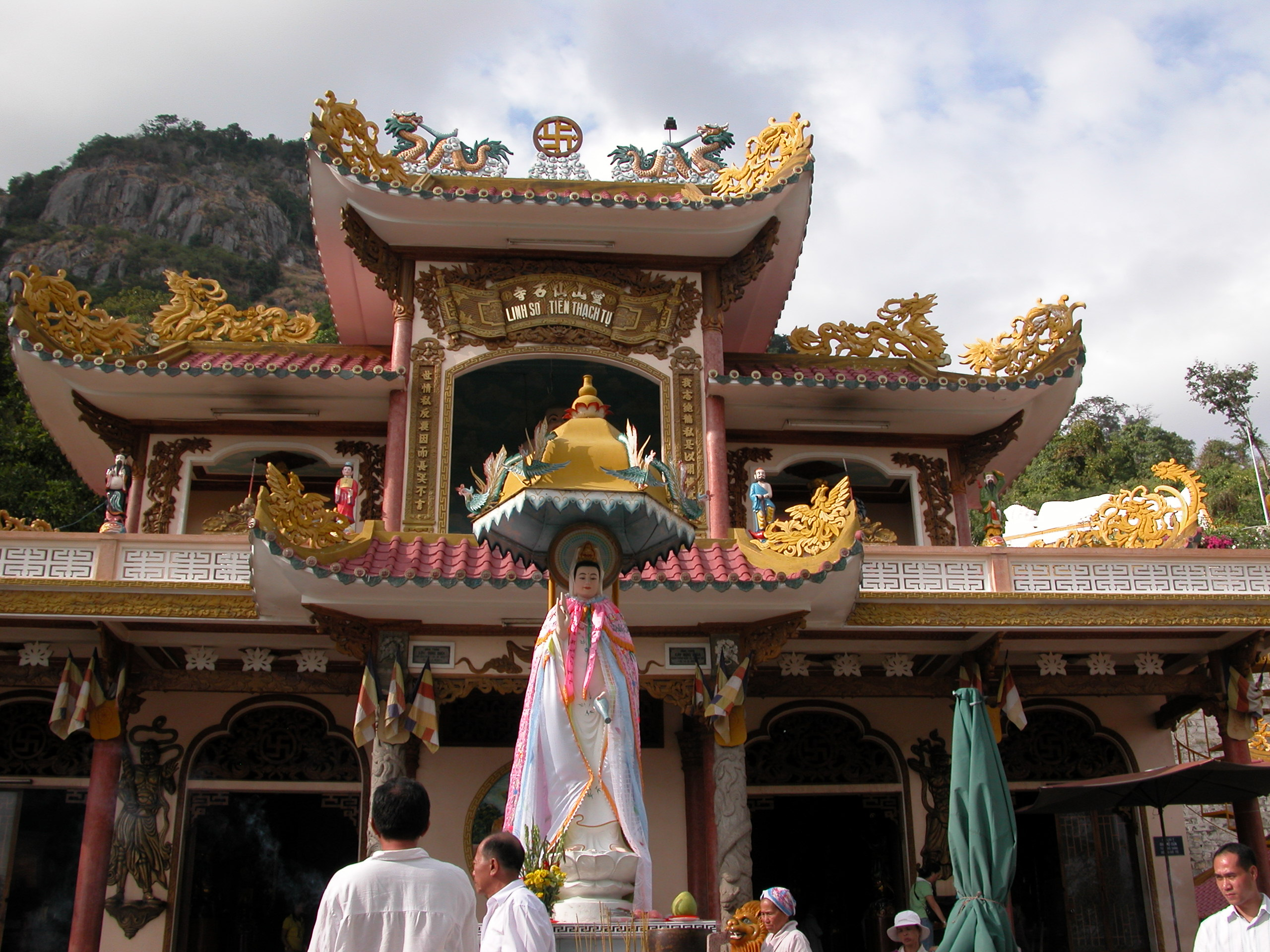
Linh Sơn Thiên Thạch Temple on the Bà Đen mountain, Tây Ninh province, Vietnam.

=== Pre-Vietnam War ===
Variations of the legend of Núi Bà Đen exist. The oldest Khmer myth involves a female deity, "Neang Khmau" who left her footprints on the mountain rocks. The Vietnamese myth centers around a woman, Bà Đen, falling in love with a soldier and then through betrayal or suicide Bà Đen dies on the mountain. It has special significance to the Vietnamese Buddhist population and has a famous shrine about two thirds of the way up the mountain. Also, to the Cao Dai sect the mountain has special religious significance and its temple, the Tay Ninh Holy See, is close to the mountain.

During World War II the mountain was occupied by the Japanese, and later it was controlled by the Viet Minh, the French and the Vietcong.

=== Vietnam War ===
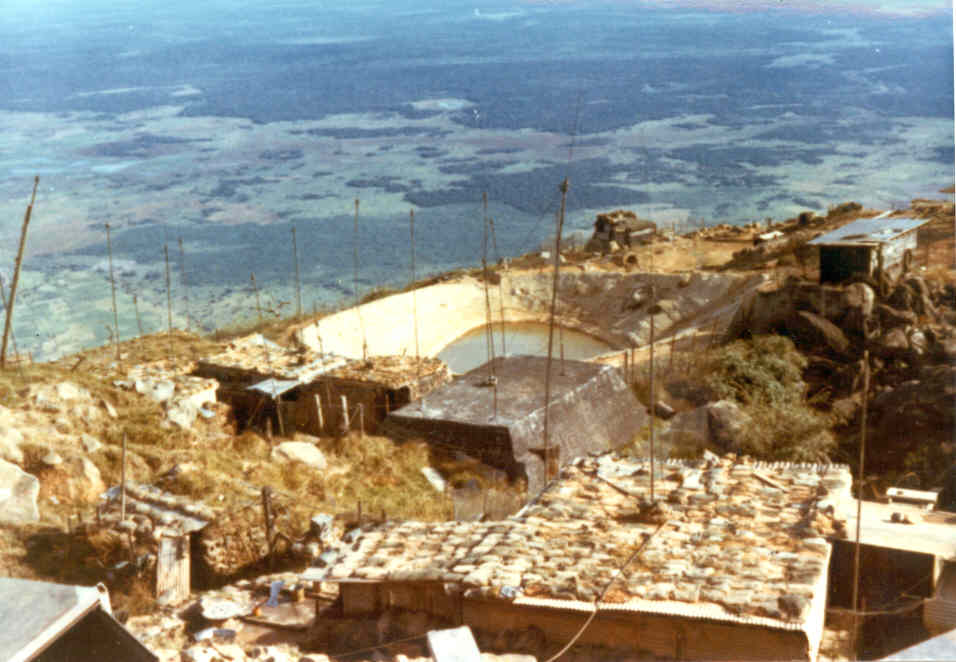
View from the top of the mountain c. 1967 or 1968

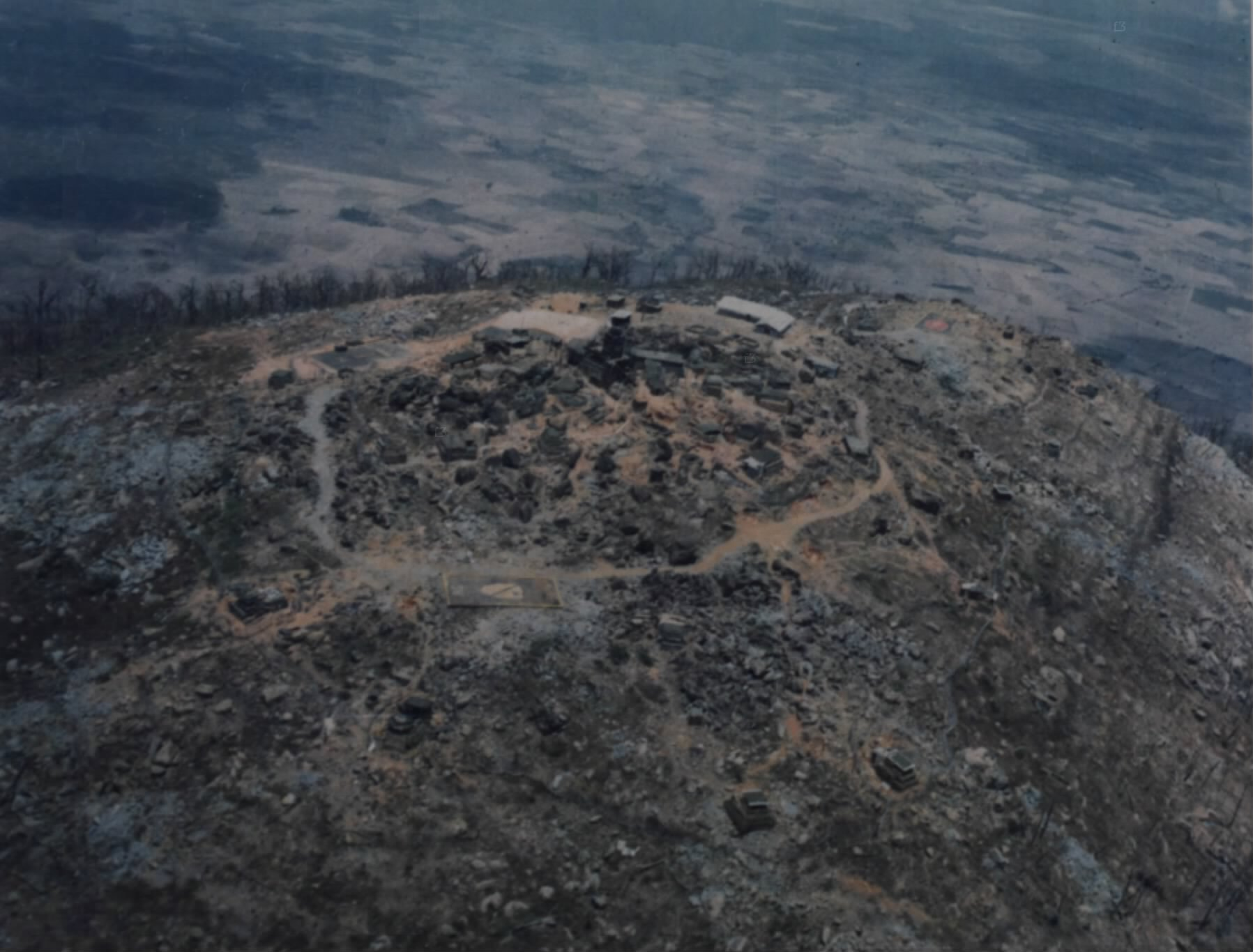
Nui Ba Den radio relay site, 21 March 1970

The Mekong Delta is generally a flat region with the exception of the Black Virgin Mountain. The mountain commands everything in its sight and was therefore a strategic location for both sides during the war.

Colonel Donald Cook was the first Marine captured in the Vietnam war. For a time he was held near Black Virgin mountain.

In May 1964 the mountain top was assaulted by the Special Forces 3rd MIKE Force and the peak was held by American forces with the 121st Signal Battalion establishing a radio relay station, callsign Granite Romeo Tango, there in February 1966. Supplied by helicopter for much of the war the Americans controlled the top and the Vietcong (VC) controlled the bottom and surrounding foothills.

The base was occupied by over 140 Americans when on the night of 13 May 1968 the base was attacked and overrun by the VC. By 02:30 on 14 May the VC had been driven off by gunship and artillery fire. The results of the attack were 24 U.S. killed, two U.S. missing and 25 VC killed.

On 4 January 1970 U.S. forces launched Operation Cliff Dweller IV, a sweep of the mountain’s rugged northeastern slope. The 3rd Battalion, 22nd Infantry, conducted the sweep, with Company A, 2nd Battalion, 34th Armor and part of the 4th Battalion, 23rd Infantry, waiting at the bottom of the slope as a blocking force. Before dawn tanks and infantry took up positions at the foot of Nui Ba Den. At 08:00, helicopters began delivering the 3rd Battalion’s Companies B and C to the summit. Soon afterward, other helicopters deposited the battalion’s reconnaissance platoon on the mountain’s northern shoulder, from which they could observe the progress of Companies B and C and block any attempts by the VC to escape in that direction. Descending the precipitous slope was slow work, and both companies had to stop for the night less than halfway down. Rain during the night soaked the rocks, further impeding the infantry’s movement the next morning, but the troops reached the foot of the mountain unscathed. Continued searches the following day uncovered some caches, but contact with the VC remained light. On the morning of 8 January, however, the VC opened fire from concealed positions, leading to steady contact until the operation terminated on 11 January. The Americans had killed 159 VC at a loss of three killed and 55 wounded.

In early December 1974 heavy combat in Tây Ninh began, with People's Army of Vietnam (PAVN) rockets falling on the province capital and on adjacent military installations. The 80-man 3rd Company, 314th Regional Force Battalion guarding the radio relay station on the summit of Nui Ba Den began receiving attacks of increasing intensity and frequency. Helicopter resupply and evacuation had become impossible, and although the company commander reported sufficient food and ammunition, water was running very short and several severely wounded men required evacuation. PAVN assaults on Nui Ba Den continued throughout December 1974, but the RF Company held on. RVNAF efforts to resupply the troops on Nui Ba Den were largely unsuccessful. Helicopters were driven off by heavy fire, and fighter-bombers were forced to excessive altitudes by SA-7 missiles and antiaircraft artillery. One F-5A fighter-bomber was shot down by an SA-7 on 14 December. Finally on 6 January 1975, without food and water and with nearly all ammunition expended, the company picked up its wounded and withdrew down the mountain to friendly lines.

== Landslide ==
On the afternoon of November 14, 2021, a landslide occurred in several areas of Mount Bà Đen, with rocks and soil sliding down from the summit. The initial cause was attributed to heavy localized rainfall over a two-week period in Tây Ninh. The following day, authorities from the Management Board of Bà Đen National Tourism Area and the Forest Protection Department inspected the site and determined that the main cause was the displacement of a mass of rocks and soil that had been accumulated for construction purposes on the mountain peak, resulting in a long stretch of flowing mud. No casualties were reported as a result of the incident.

== Bà Đen Mountain Spring Festival ==
The Bà Đen Mountain Spring Festival takes place annually from the 4th to the end of January, with the key three days being the 4th, 5th, and 6th. During this event, pilgrims visit Bà Đen Mountain and often present red envelopes containing rice or small amounts of money as a gesture to seek blessings from Bà at the beginning of the year, with hopes for prosperity and wealth.

In 2022, the Bà Đen Mountain Spring Festival attracted the highest number of visitors in the Southeast region. On August 14, 2019, the Ministry of Culture, Sports and Tourism recognized the ceremony honoring the Linh Sơn Thánh Mẫu (Holy Mother Linh Sơn) on Bà Đen Mountain as a national intangible cultural heritage. It is regarded as a significant folk festival in Tây Ninh province and the wider Southeast region.

== Tourist attraction ==
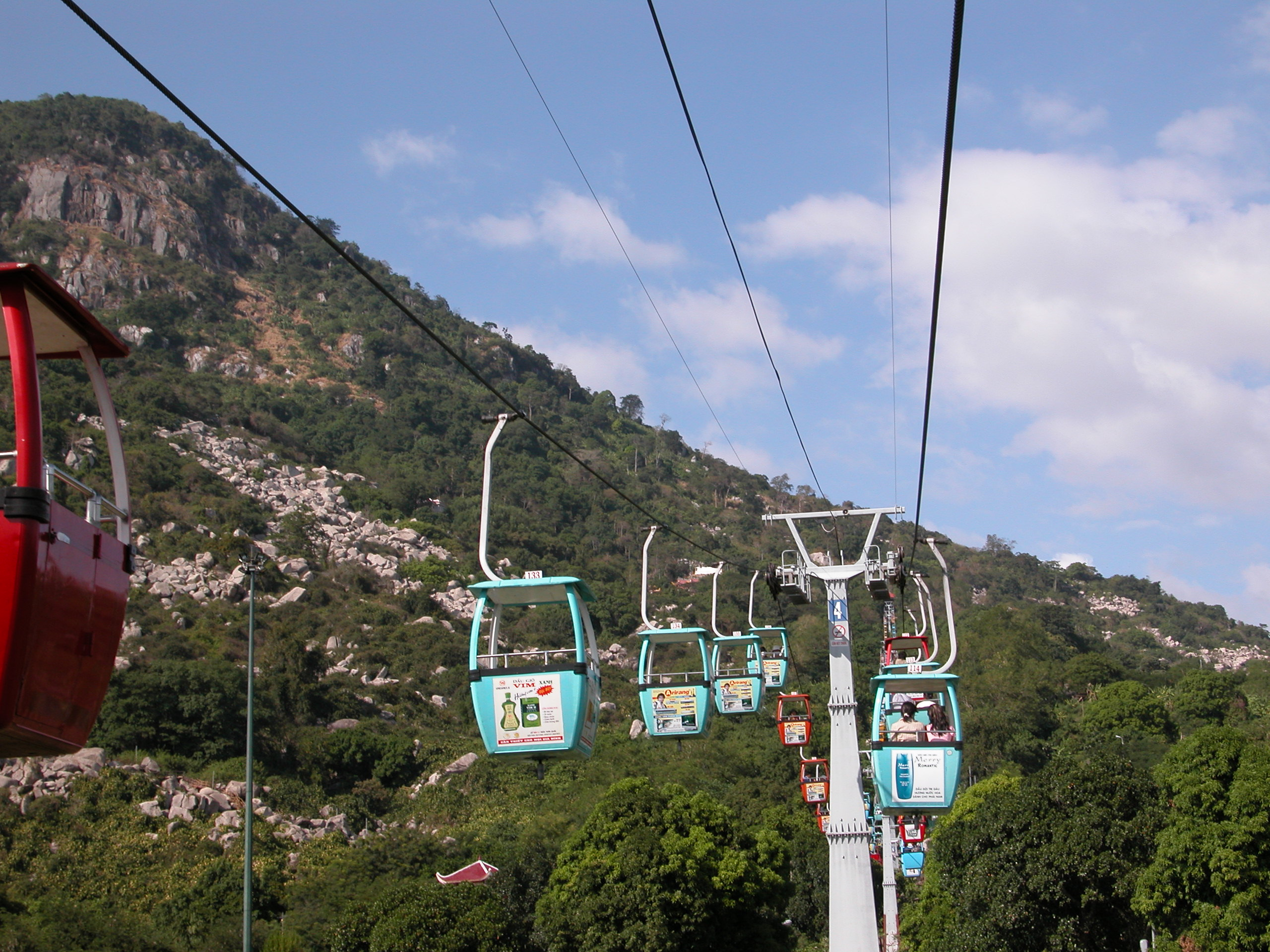
Cableway to pagodas atop Bà Đen mountain, Tây Ninh province, Vietnam

In 2014, representing the Government Office, Deputy Prime Minister Vũ Đức Đam signed the decision "Overall Planning for the development of Ba Den Mountain National Tourist Area, Tay Ninh Province until 2020, with a vision to 2030." In subsequent years, the tourism development planning project has been continuously supplemented, including decisions on planning a tourist area of 2,903.79 hectares and conducting development research in conjunction with the Tay Ninh Holy See and Dau Tieng Lake.

In 2017–2018, Sun Group began collaborating with the Tay Ninh Provincial People's Committee to plan and develop the Ba Den Mountain National Tourist Area, named "Sun World Ba Den Mountain," with a total investment of over 2,000 billion VND for the first phase. In 2022, the Ba Den Mountain National Tourist Area became one of the top 5 most visited destinations in the country.

== Climbing ==
Visitors have two routes to climb to the summit of Bà Đen Mountain. One trail, located behind Bà Pagoda, is considered quite steep and short, but it presents numerous hazards, including rockslides, slippery surfaces, and venomous snakes. This route features four food and supply stations. The alternative trail begins at the Martyrs' Monument and follows the power lines to the summit. While easier to navigate, this route is considerably longer, exposed to sunlight, and lacks supply stations.

However, on May 14, 2021, Phạm Văn Hải, Deputy Head of the Bà Đen Mountain National Tourist Area Management Board, under the Tay Ninh Provincial People's Committee, issued a notice temporarily suspending all land routes to the summit of Bà Đen Mountain. This includes the trail from Bà Pagoda, the power line route, and the trails in the Ma Thiên Lãnh area. The Management Board cited reasons such as the impact of the rainy season, which causes erosion and landslides, posing significant dangers to hikers, and the ongoing construction of a road to the summit by an investor.

== See also ==
- Dong Ap Bia
- 25th Infantry Division - the US 25th was stationed near and on the mountain.
