= Long An =

Ward and capital of Tây Ninh province, Vietnam

- Ward
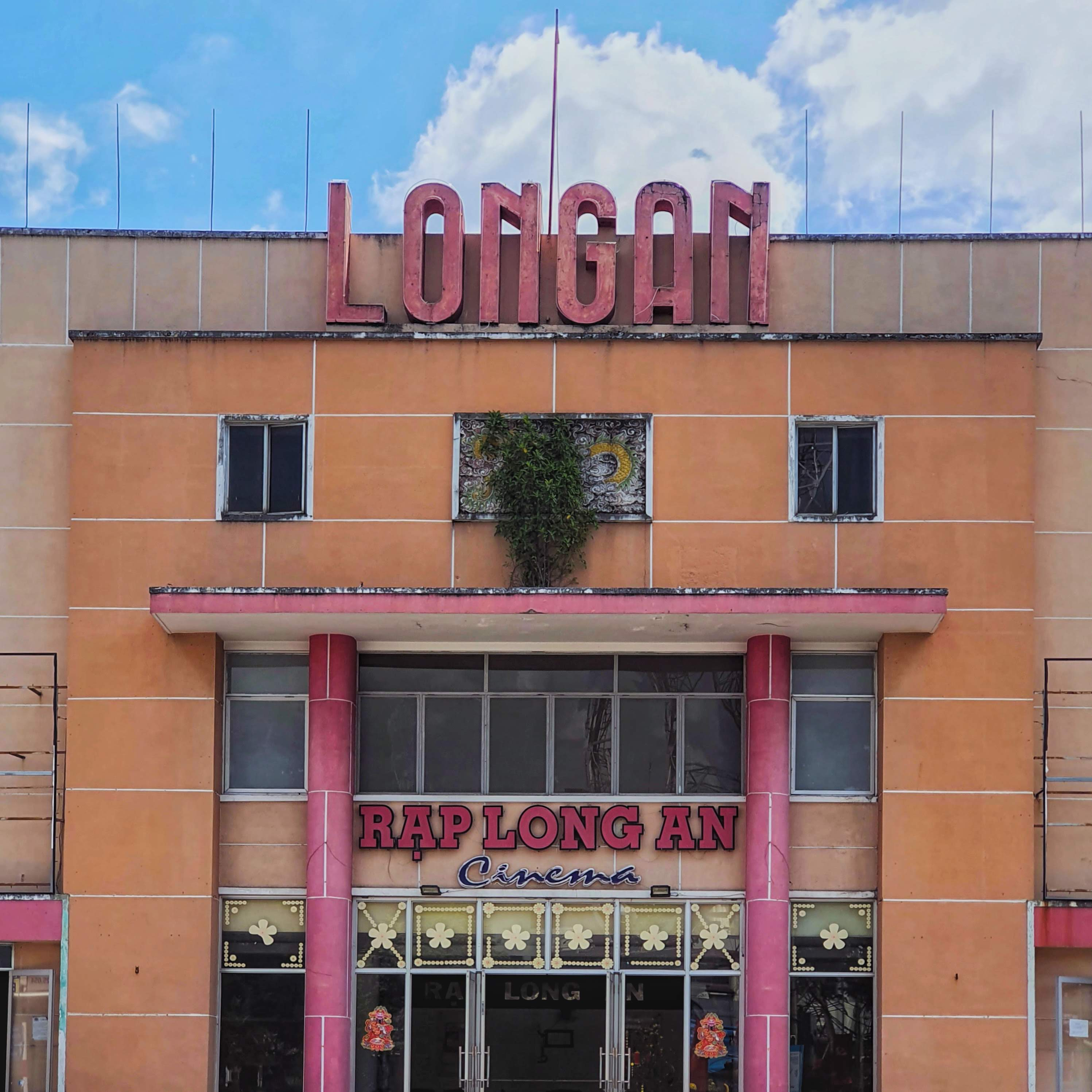
- Long An cinema in Long An ward
- Interactive map of Long An
- Country: Vietnam
- Region: Southeast
- Province: Tây Ninh
- Establish: June 16, 2025
- Headquarters of the People's Committee: 76, Hùng Vương street, Long An ward

Government
  - Type: Ward
  - Body: Long An Party Committee

Area
  - Total: 34.9 km^{2} (13.5 sq mi)

Population (2025)
  - Total: 106,667 people
  - Density: 3,060/km^{2} (7,920/sq mi)
- Time zone: UTC+07:00

Long An is a ward in Tây Ninh province, Vietnam. It is also the location of the administrative center of Tây Ninh province. The ward is one of 96 communes and wards in the province after the 2025 reorganization.

== Geography ==
Long An is a ward located in the southern part of Tây Ninh province, 115km south of Tân Ninh ward. Long An ward has a geographical location:

- To the east, it borders Tân An ward.
- To the west, it borders Mỹ An commune.
- To the south, it borders Khánh Hậu ward.
- To the north, it borders Thủ Thừa commune and Nhựt Tảo commune.

== History ==
Prior to 2025, Long An ward comprised wards 1, 2, 3, 4, 5, 6, Hướng Thọ Phú commune of Tân An provincial city, and part of Bình Thạnh, Thủ Thừa district, all belonging to Long An province.

On June 12, 2025, the National Assembly of Vietnam issued Resolution No. 202/2025/QH15 on the reorganization of provincial-level administrative units. Accordingly:

- Tây Ninh province was established by merging the entire area and population of Long An province and Tây Ninh province.

On June 16, 2025, the Standing Committee of the National Assembly of Vietnam issued Resolution No. 1682/NQ-UBTVQH15 on the reorganization of commune-level administrative units in Tây Ninh province. Accordingly:

- Long An ward was established by merging the entire area and population of wards 1, 2, 3, 4, 5, 6, and Hướng Thọ Phú commune (formerly part of Tân An provincial city) and the remaining part of Bình Thạnh commune after reorganization (According to the provisions of Clause 20, Article 1; formerly belonging to Thủ Thừa district); (Excerpt from Clause 84, Article 1).
