= Vàm Cỏ Đông River =

River in Vietnam

The Vàm Cỏ Đông River (Vietnamese: Sông Vàm Cỏ Đông) is a river of Vietnam. It originates in Cambodia, flows through the provinces of Tây Ninh, Long An and is 220 kilometres long. It is part of the Đồng Nai River system.
