= Dương Minh Châu, Tây Ninh =

Dương Minh Châu Phường Dương Minh Châu
- Ward
- Location within Vietnam
- Coordinates: 11°23′01″N 106°13′44″E
- Country: Vietnam
- Region: Southeast
- Province: Tây Ninh
- Time zone: UTC+7 (UTC + 7)
- Website: http://duongminhchau.tayninh.gov.vn/

Dương Minh Châu is a ward (phường) of Tây Ninh province, Vietnam.
