= Tây Ninh (city) =

Tây Ninh Thành phố Tây Ninh Thái Hiệp Thạnh
- Provincial city (Class-2)
- Tây Ninh City
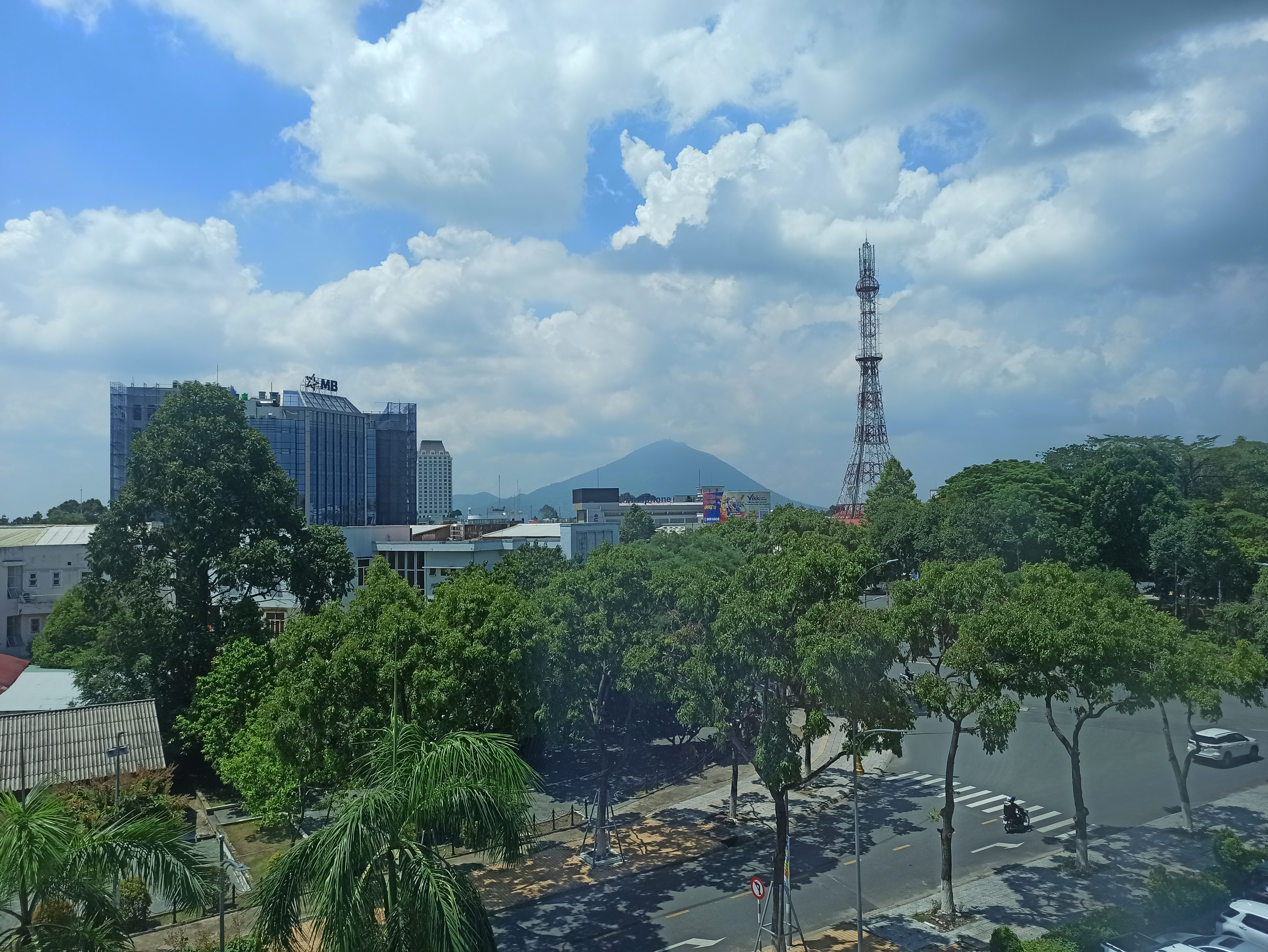
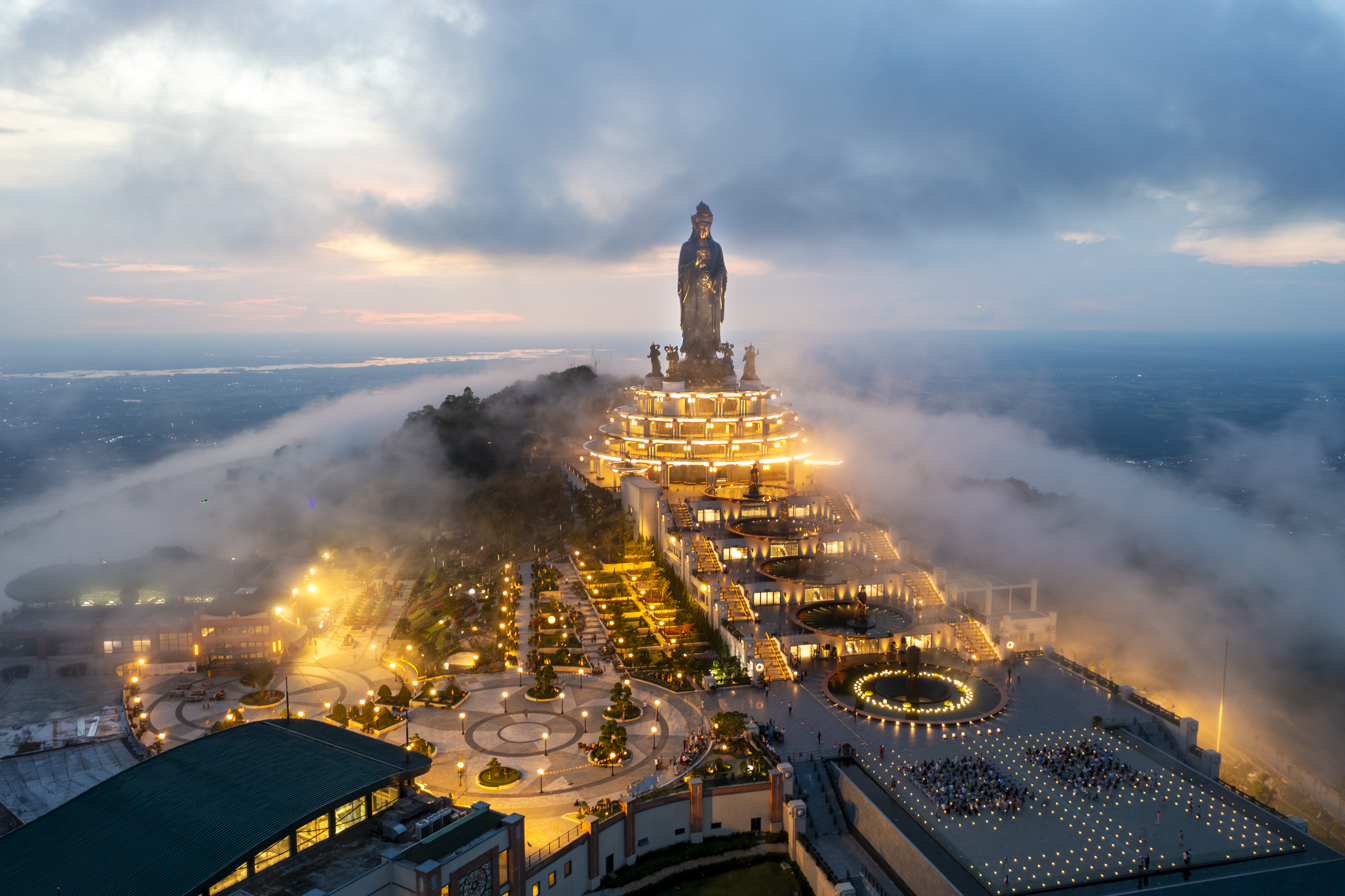
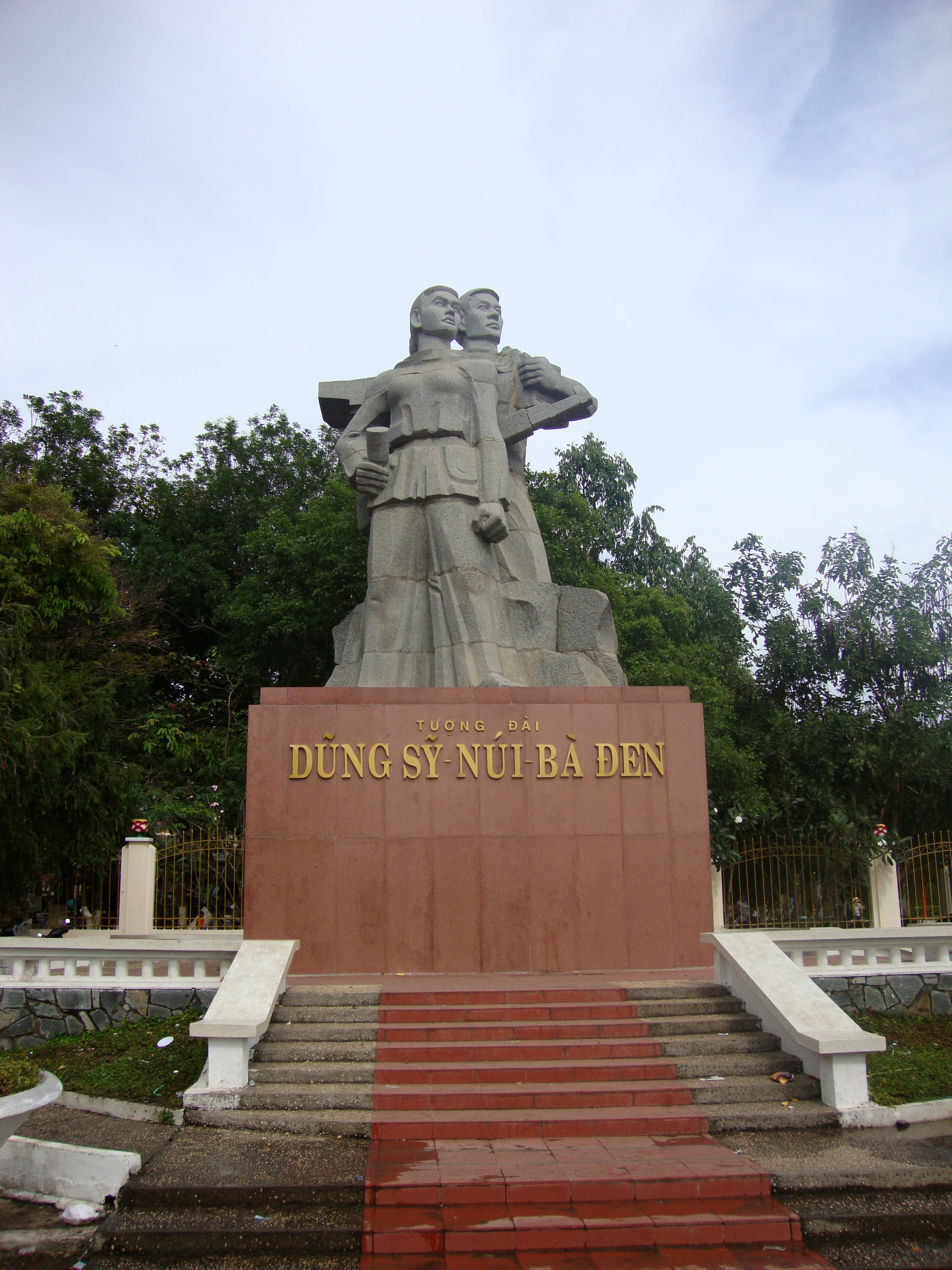
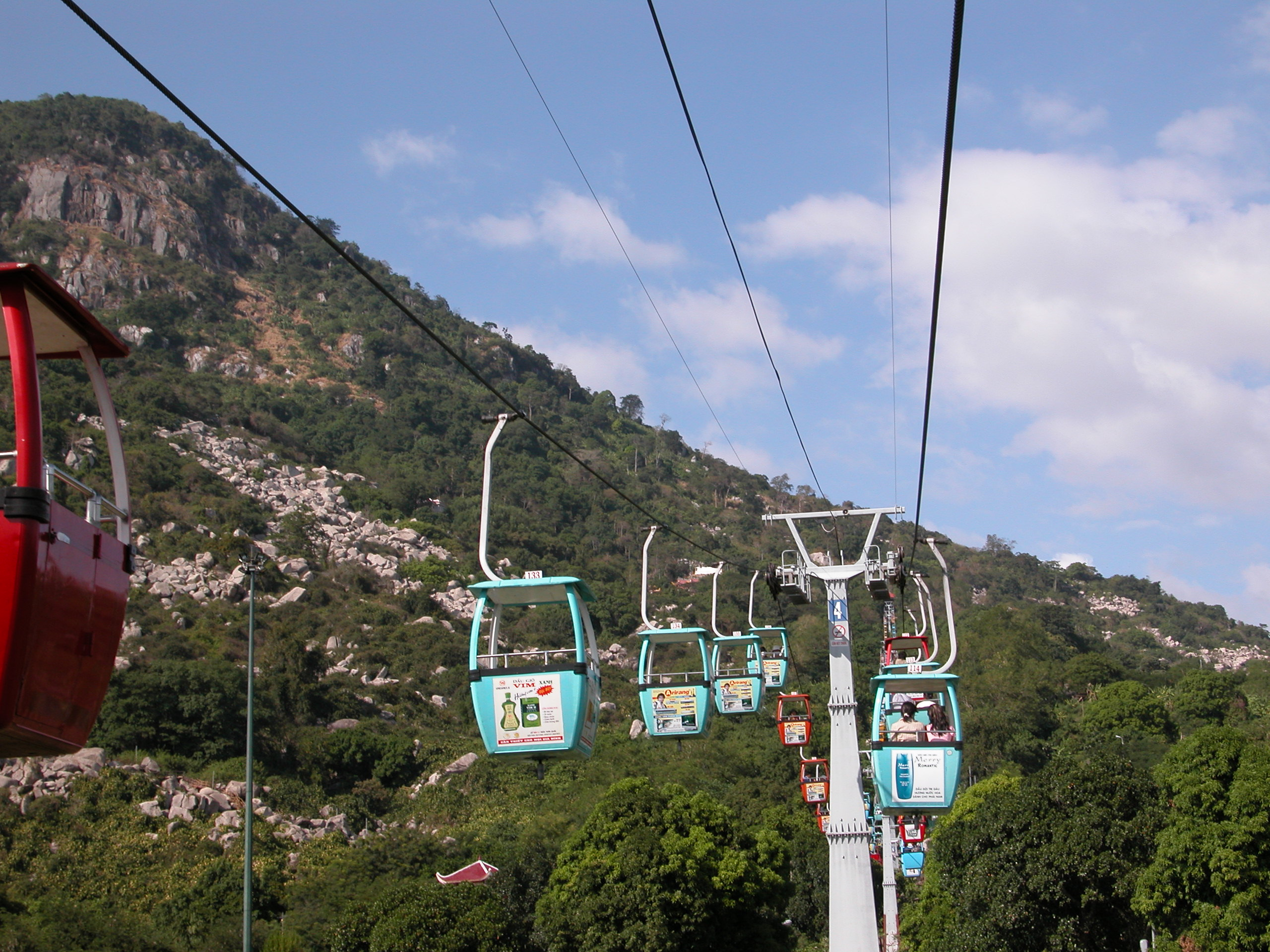
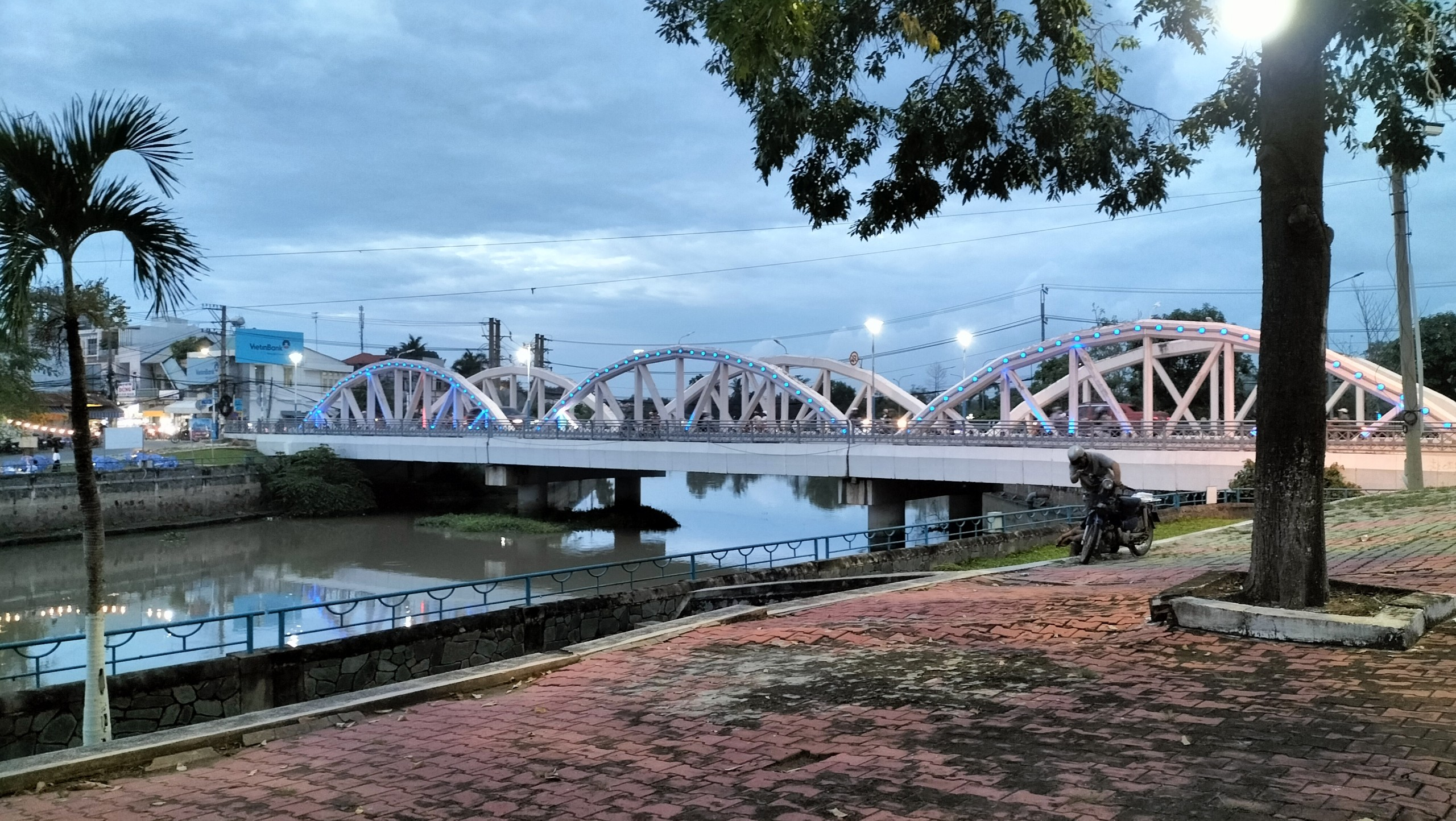
- From left to right: Tây Ninh City Centre, Bà Đen Mountain with Lady Buddha Statue (Tượng Phật Bà Tây Bổ Đà Sơn) on the top, Monument to the Heroes of Bà Đen Mountain, Bà Đen Mountain Cable Car, Quan Bridge crosses Tây Ninh Canal
- Interactive map of Tây Ninh
- Location within Vietnam
- Coordinates: 11°22′4″N 106°07′8″E
- Country: Vietnam
- Province: Tây Ninh

Area
  - Total: 140 km^{2} (54 sq mi)

Population (2023)
  - Total: 269,320
  - Density: 1,900/km^{2} (5,000/sq mi)
- Time zone: UTC+7 (Indochina Time)

Tây Ninh is a former provincial city and former capital of Tây Ninh province in Southeastern Vietnam. It is one of the cities in the Southern Key Economic Region (Ho Chi Minh City metropolitan area). Tây Ninh is approximately 90 km (55 miles) northwest of Ho Chi Minh City, the largest city of Vietnam, and 182 km (113 miles) to Phnom Penh, capital of Cambodia; all by National Route 22. As of 2019, the city had a population of 135,254 over the provincial population of 1,169,165 on a total area of 140 km^{2} (54 sq mi).

== Tourist attractions ==
The city is known for being the home of the Cao Dai religion, a syncretic Vietnamese faith that includes the teachings and practices of the major world religions. The Cao Dai religion's Holy Tower, built between 1933 and 1955, is located in Hòa Thành, around five kilometres (3.1 mi) to the east of Tây Ninh city centre.

Besides the Cao Đàai Holy See, other tourist attractions include:

- Black Virgin Mountain, the tallest mountain in southern Vietnam
- Dau Tieng Lake, one of the largest man-made lakes in Vietnam and Southeast Asia.
- Lò Gò–Xa Mát National Park
- Thiền Lâm or Go Kén Pagoda
- Càang Rệec Forest
- Mộc Bài International Border Gate
- Long Hoa market
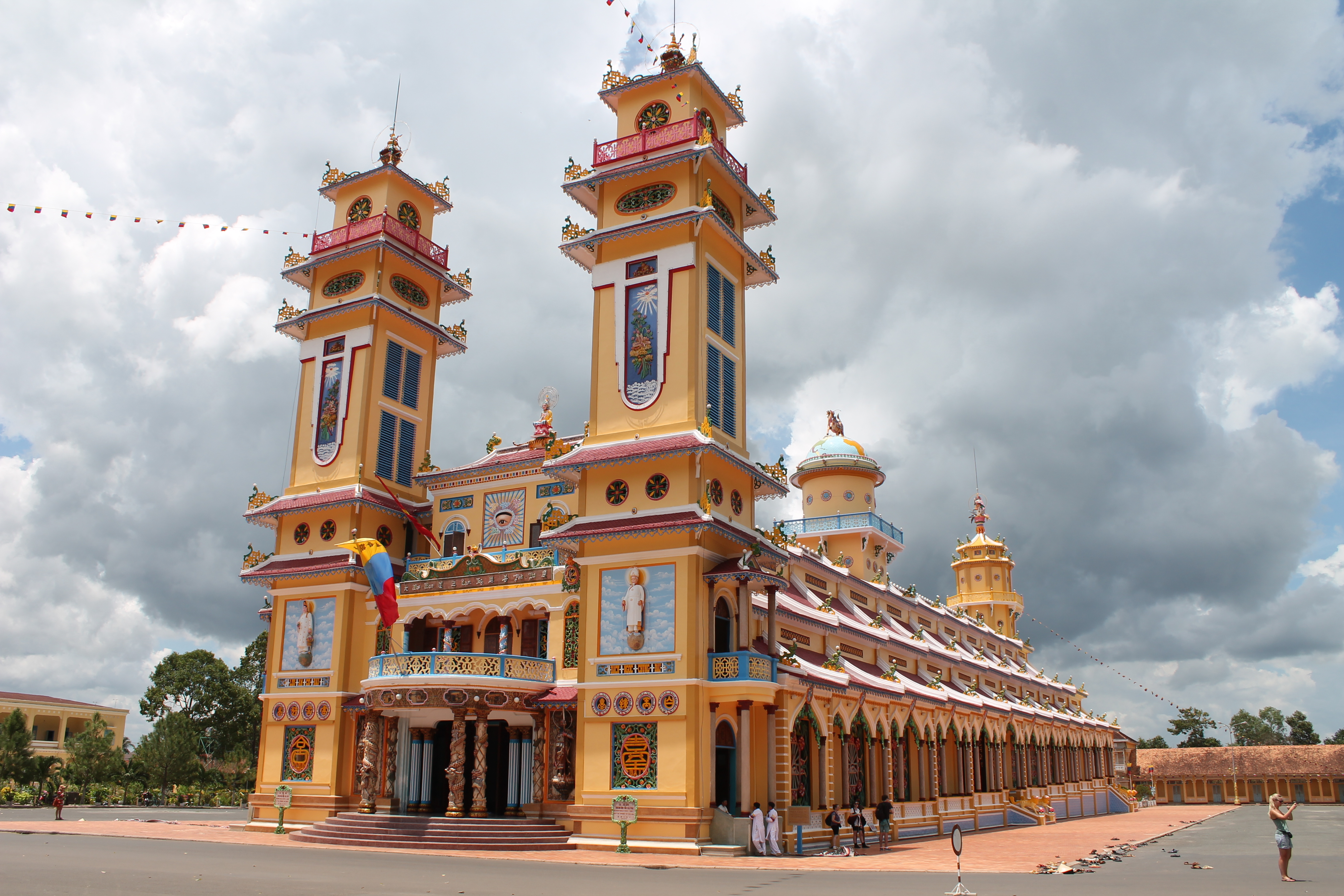
This is the Holy See Temple (Thánh Thất Cao Đàii), completed in 1947, features unique architecture & a colorful interior

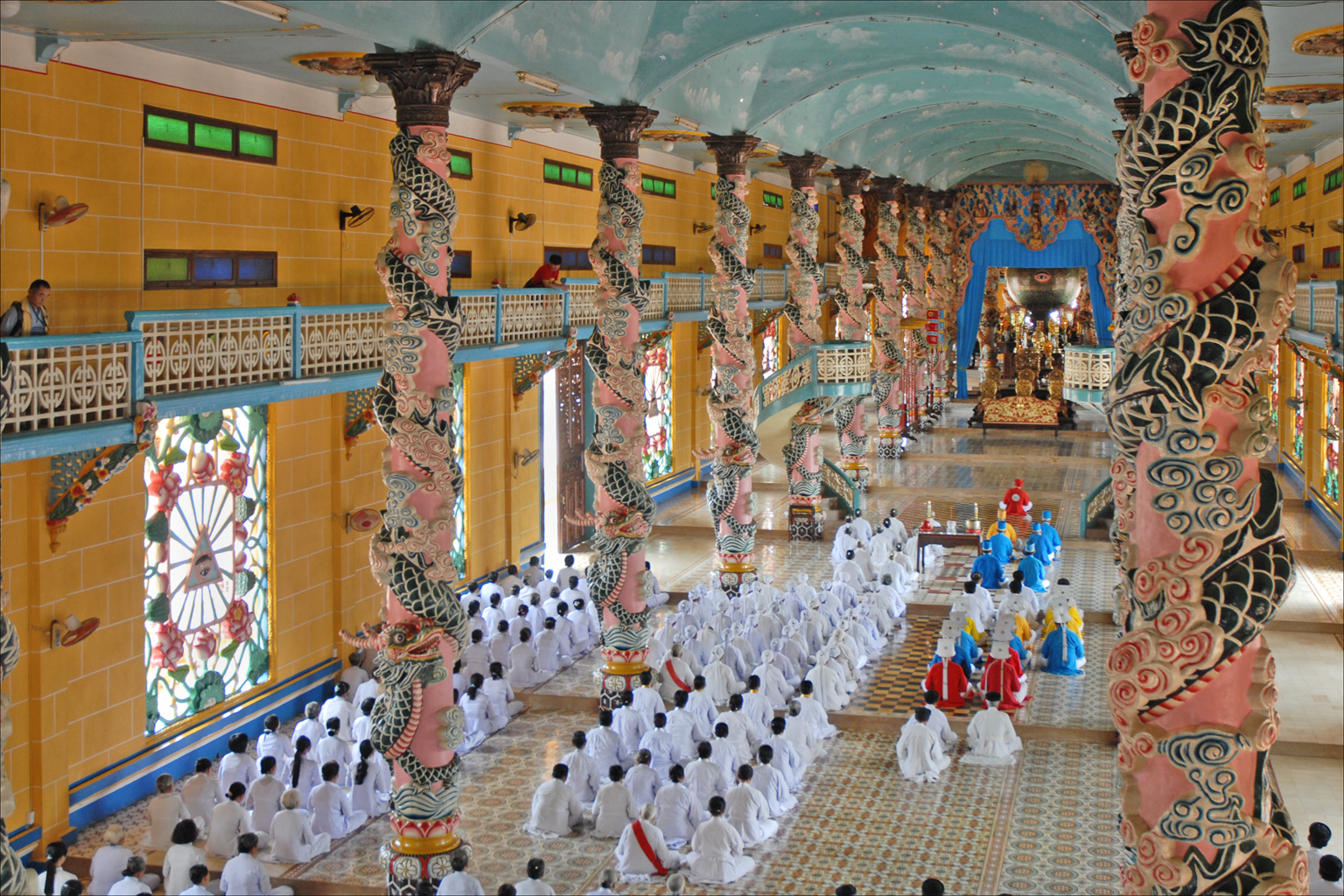
CaĐà Dai followers doing worship in the Holy See Temple

== Economics ==
=== Agriculture ===
With its vast agricultural land covering over 85% of the natural land area (equivalent to 370,000 ha), hot and humid climate all year round, relatively flat terrain, and the presence of the Vàm Cỏ Đông River and Dầu Tiếng Reservoir bed irrigation system, the City of Tây Ninh has relatively favourable natural and climate conditions. These factors result in a consistent water supply for hundreds of thousands of hectares of agricultural land, making it an ideal location for cultivating a wide range of tropical agricultural product such as Rubber, Sugarcane, and cassava, which are the most commonly grown crops in Tây Ninh nowadays.

=== Industry ===
Phước Đồng Industrial Park, one of the largest industrial zone in Vietnam and Southeast Asia, is situated 24 miles away from the city. The park covers an area of 2,190 ha and is part of a larger complex spanning 3,285 ha, which includes Go Dau and Trang Bang districts. The strategic location of Phuoc Dong complex provides easy access to the Ho Chi Minh City - Moc Bai Expressway, Thanh Phuoc transshipment port, and Moc Bai international border gate.

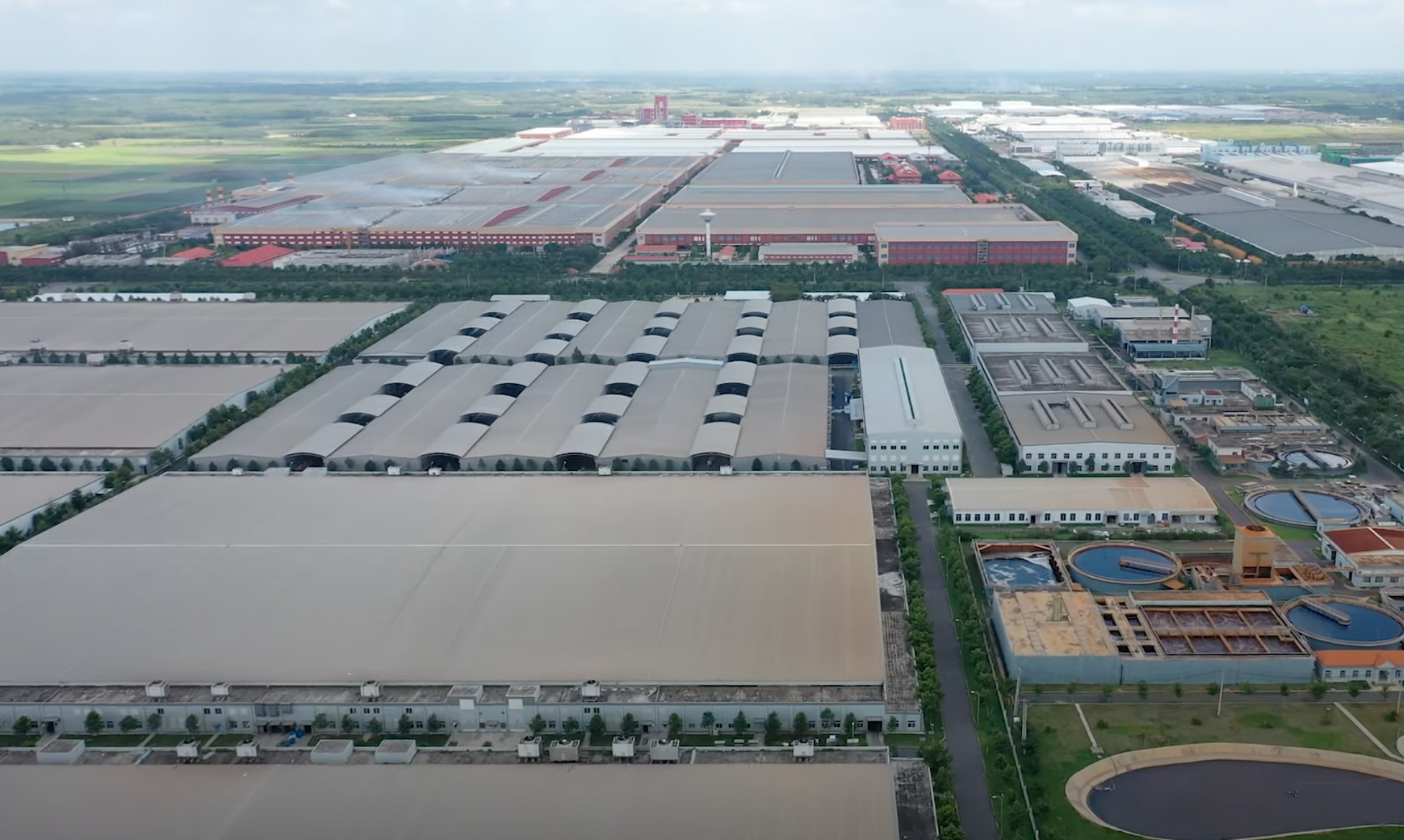
Phước Đồng Industrial Park

== Notable people ==
- Nguyễn Thị Ngọc Châu - Miss Universe Vietnam 2022
- Nguyễn Văn Nên - Secretary of the Ho Chi Minh City Party Committee
- Vũ Mạnh Cường - MC and journalist grew up in Tây Ninh.

== Education ==
- Hoàng Lê Kha High School for the Gifted
- Tây Ninh High School
- Ly Thường Kiệt High School
- Trần Đại Nghĩa High School
- IGC Tây Ninh (escalator school)
- Tây Ninh College of Education
- Lộc Hưng High School

== History ==
In 1874, with the Giáp Tuất Treaty, the six provinces of Cochinchina, including Tây Ninh, officially became a French colony. By 1876, the French colonial authorities divided Cochinchina into four administrative regions, and Tây Ninh at that time belonged to Saigon.

Moving into the 20th century, in 1942, the provincial head of Tây Ninh submitted a proposal to establish a township in Thái Hiệp Thạnh commune. This proposal was approved by the French colonial government, marking the first step in the urban development of Tây Ninh.

After the August Revolution in 1945, Tây Ninh maintained its administrative boundaries. By 1950, Tây Ninh township was established, but due to unfavorable conditions, it was later dissolved. After the 1954 Geneva Accords, Tây Ninh township was re-established in the old area, including a part of Thái Hiệp Thạnh commune and surrounding areas. After 1975, Tây Ninh township consisted of three inner-city wards.

In 2001, Tây Ninh township was expanded, incorporating more communes and establishing new wards. In 2012, Tây Ninh township was recognized as a grade-III urban area. And on December 29, 2013, Tây Ninh city was officially established. On March 14, 2025, Tây Ninh city was recognized as a grade-II urban area directly under Tây Ninh province.

== Climate ==
Climate data for Tây Ninh
Month	Jan	Feb	Mar	Apr	May	Jun	Jul	Aug	Sep	Oct	Nov	Dec	Year
Record high °C (°F)	36.2 (97.2)	37.2 (99.0)	38.5 (101.3)	39.9 (103.8)	39.5 (103.1)	37.6 (99.7)	37.3 (99.1)	36.0 (96.8)	35.6 (96.1)	34.5 (94.1)	35.7 (96.3)	36.5 (97.7)	39.9 (103.8)
Mean daily maximum °C (°F)	32.2 (90.0)	33.4 (92.1)	34.8 (94.6)	35.2 (95.4)	34.2 (93.6)	32.8 (91.0)	32.2 (90.0)	32.0 (89.6)	31.6 (88.9)	31.5 (88.7)	31.6 (88.9)	31.5 (88.7)	32.7 (90.9)
Daily mean °C (°F)	25.8 (78.4)	26.7 (80.1)	28.0 (82.4)	29.0 (84.2)	28.5 (83.3)	27.6 (81.7)	27.2 (81.0)	27.2 (81.0)	26.9 (80.4)	26.7 (80.1)	26.4 (79.5)	25.7 (78.3)	27.2 (81.0)
Mean daily minimum °C (°F)	21.3 (70.3)	22.1 (71.8)	23.6 (74.5)	25.0 (77.0)	25.2 (77.4)	24.6 (76.3)	24.3 (75.7)	24.4 (75.9)	24.3 (75.7)	23.9 (75.0)	23.1 (73.6)	21.6 (70.9)	23.6 (74.5)
Record low °C (°F)	15.3 (59.5)	17.6 (63.7)	16.8 (62.2)	21.4 (70.5)	21.1 (70.0)	19.3 (66.7)	20.8 (69.4)	21.2 (70.2)	20.3 (68.5)	18.5 (65.3)	16.9 (62.4)	13.9 (57.0)	13.9 (57.0)
Average rainfall mm (inches)	11.6 (0.46)	9.4 (0.37)	27.8 (1.09)	106.2 (4.18)	193.3 (7.61)	250.6 (9.87)	256.5 (10.10)	240.2 (9.46)	334.5 (13.17)	321.7 (12.67)	132.9 (5.23)	49.4 (1.94)	1,934.1 (76.15)
Average rainy days	1.7	1.7	3.1	7.8	15.6	19.7	20.9	20.8	22.5	21.6	11.9	4.2	151.3
Average relative humidity (%)	72.3	72.5	72.2	74.7	80.6	84.1	84.1	85.0	86.4	85.5	80.3	74.8	79.4
Mean monthly sunshine hours	248.0	239.8	265.2	242.8	233.4	196.2	198.6	188.4	175.3	194.5	210.5	230.8	2,613.3
Source: Vietnam Institute for Building Science and Technology

== Administrative division ==
The City of Tây Ninh, Vietnam comprises 7 wards (phường) and 3 communes (xã):

- Ward 1
- Ward 2
- Ward 3
- Ward IV
- Hiệp Ninh Ward
- Ninh Sơn Ward
- Ninh Thạnh Ward
- Bình Minh Commune
- Tân Bình Commune
- Thạnh Tân Commune

The ward is further divided into quarters (khu phố). The commune is further divided into hamlets (ấp).

After the merger in 2025, the City of Tây Ninh is divided into 3 wards that directly under Tây Ninh province are: Tân Ninh (Ward 1, 2, 3 , IV and Hiệp Ninh), Ninh Thạnh and Bình Minh (Bình Minh, Thạnh Tân, Tân Bình and Ninh Sơn). All of them are divided into quarters.
