= Châu Thành, Tây Ninh =

Châu Thành Xã Châu Thành
- Commune
- Châu Thành commune
- Location within Vietnam
- Coordinates: 11°18′43″N 106°01′41″E
- Country: Vietnam
- Region: Southeast
- Province: Tây Ninh
- Time zone: UTC+7 (UTC + 7)

Châu Thành is a commune (xã) of Tây Ninh Province, Vietnam.
