= Tây Ninh province =

Province of Vietnam

Tây Ninh
- Province
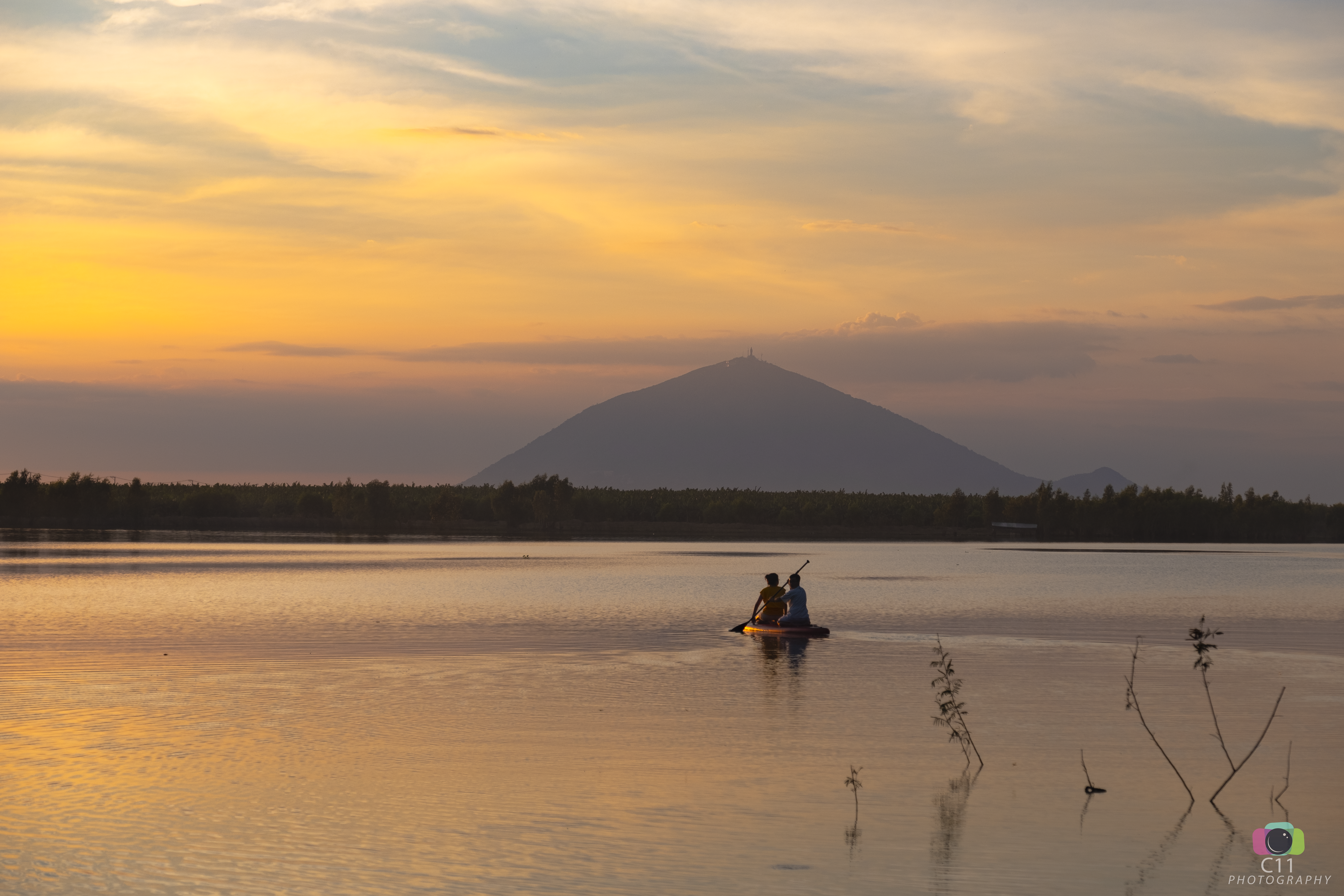
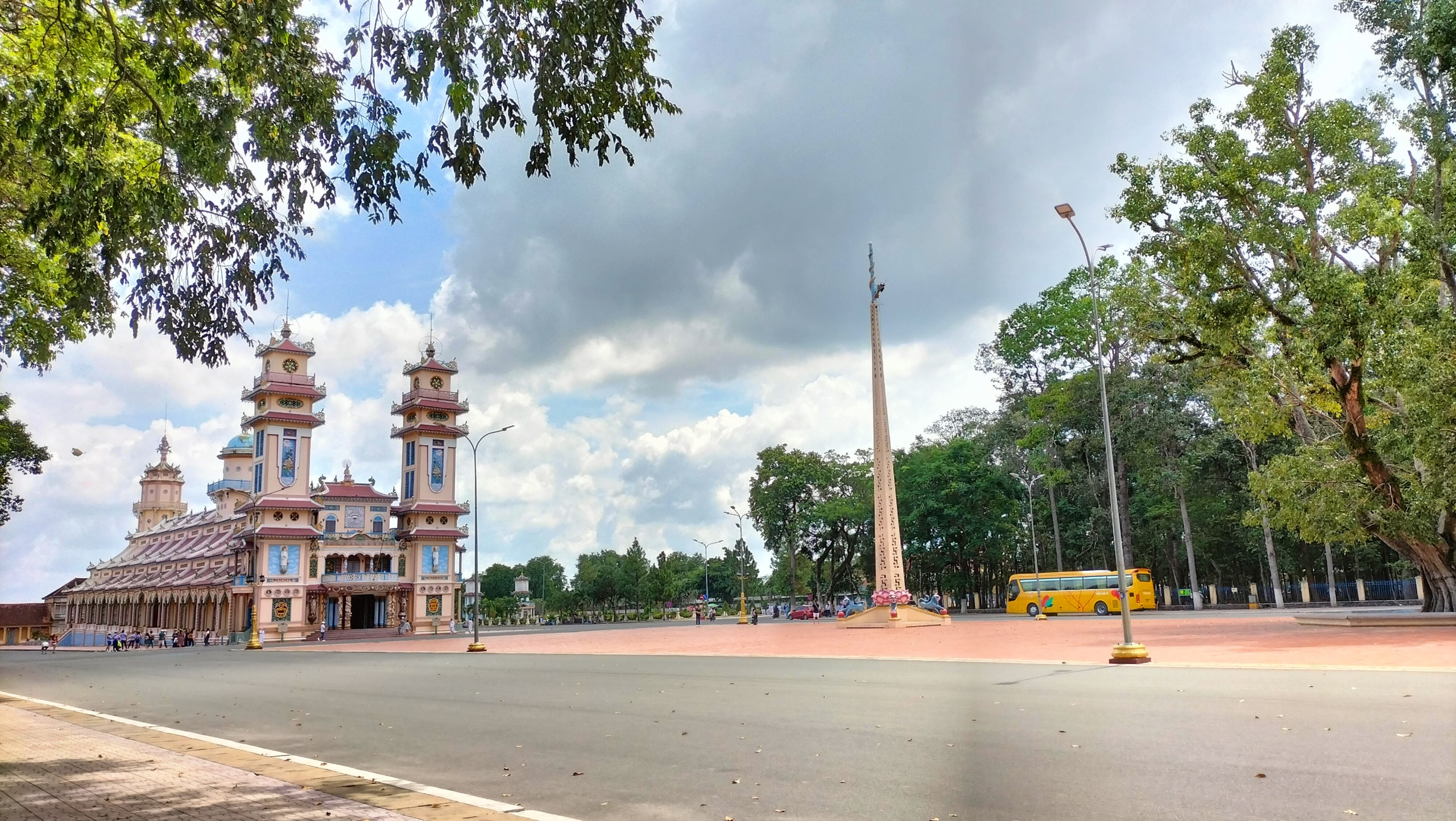
- Clockwise from top: Black Virgin Mountain; Dầu Tiếng Lake; Tây Ninh Holy See

- Seal
- Nickname: Western Security
- Location in Vietnam
- Interactive map of Tây Ninh
- Coordinates: 11°20′N 106°10′E
- Country: Vietnam
- Region: Southeast
- Metropolitan area: Ho Chi Minh City metropolitan area
- Capital: Long An ward

Government
  - People's Council Chair: Nguyễn Mạnh Hùng
  - People's Committee Chair: Lê Văn Hẳn
  - Secretary of Tây Ninh Party Committee: Nguyễn Văn Quyết

Area
  - Total: 8,536.44 km^{2} (3,295.94 sq mi)

Population (2025)
  - Total: 3,480,300
  - Density: 407.70/km^{2} (1,055.9/sq mi)

Demographics
  - Ethnicities: Vietnamese, Chăm, Khmer, Hoa

GDP
  - Total: VND 108.971 trillion US$4.572 billion (2023)
- Time zone: UTC+7 (ICT)
- Calling code: 66
- ISO 3166 code: VN-37
- HDI (2020): ▲0.703 (36th)
- Website: www.tayninh.gov.vn

Tây Ninh is a province in the Southeast region of Vietnam. It is located between Ho Chi Minh City and Phnom Penh, as part of Vietnam’s Southern Key Economic Zone. Tây Ninh City is 99 km away from Hồ Chí Minh City following National Route 22 and 40 km away from the border with Cambodia to the northwest.

The province has a population of 1,169,165 (in 2019) and an area of 4,041.65 km^{2} (1,560.49 mi^{2}). Followers of the Cao Dai, who dominate the area, have built a Holy See in Tây Ninh. The region also has concentrations of the Hòa Hảo, a rival Buddhist sect. The area is noted for its large rubber and sugar plantations; rice and coconuts are also harvested.

== History ==
Because of the once-vaunted political and military power of the Cao Dai, this region was the scene of fighting during the First Indochina War. Tây Ninh province served as a terminus of the Ho Chi Minh trail during the Vietnam War, and in 1969 the Viet Cong captured Tây Ninh town and held it for days. During the period of conflict between Cambodia and Vietnam in the 1970s, the Khmer Rouge launched a number of cross-border raids into Tây Ninh province and committed atrocities against civilians. Cemeteries around Tây Ninh are reminders of these events.

On June 12, 2025, the National Assembly passed Resolution No. 202/2025/QH15, which took effect the same day, merging Long An Province into Tây Ninh Province.

== Administrative divisions ==
Tây Ninh province is divided into 96 commune-level administrative units, including 14 wards and 82 communes:

- 14 wards: An Tịnh, Bình Minh, Gia Lộc, Gò Dầu, Hòa Thành, Khánh Hậu, Kiến Tường, Long An (provincial capital), Long Hoa, Ninh Thạnh, Tân An, Tân Ninh, Thanh Điền, Trảng Bàng.
- 82 communes: An Lục Long, An Ninh, Bến Cầu, Bến Lức, Bình Đức, Bình Hiệp, Bình Hòa, Bình Thành, Cần Đước, Cần Giuộc, Cầu Khởi, Châu Thành, Dương Minh Châu, Đông Thành, Đức Hòa, Đức Huệ, Đức Lập, Hảo Đước, Hậu Nghĩa, Hậu Thạnh, Hiệp Hòa, Hòa Hội, Hòa Khánh, Hưng Điền, Hưng Thuận, Khánh Hưng, Long Cang, Long Chữ, Long Hựu, Long Thuận, Lộc Ninh, Lương Hòa, Mộc Hóa, Mỹ An, Mỹ Hạnh, Mỹ Lệ, Mỹ Quý, Mỹ Thạnh, Mỹ Yên, Nhơn Hòa Lập, Nhơn Ninh, Nhựt Tảo, Ninh Điền, Phước Chỉ, Phước Lý, Phước Thạnh, Phước Vinh, Phước Vĩnh Tây, Rạch Kiến, Tân Biên, Tân Châu, Tân Đông, Tân Hòa, Tân Hội, Tân Hưng, Tân Lân, Tân Lập, Tân Long, Tân Phú, Tân Tập, Tân Tây, Tân Thành, Tân Thạnh, Tân Trụ, Tầm Vu, Thạnh Bình, Thạnh Đức, Thạnh Hóa, Thạnh Lợi, Thạnh Phước, Thuận Mỹ, Thủ Thừa, Trà Vong, Truông Mít, Tuyên Bình, Tuyên Thạnh, Vàm Cỏ, Vĩnh Châu, Vĩnh Công, Vĩnh Hưng, Vĩnh Thạnh.

== Climate ==
Climate data of Tây Ninh Province (1953–2019)
	January	February	March	April	May	June	July	August	September	October	November	December
Daytime	30.5 °C	32.2 °C	34 °C	35 °C	34.6	33.4 °C	32 °C	32 °C	32 °C	31.7 °C	31.2 °C	31 °C
Nighttime	20.5 °C	21.7 °C	23 °C	24.5 °C	24 °C	24 °C	24.3 °C	24 °C	23.5 °C	22.8 °C	22.4 °C	21.2 °C
Rainfall	13 mm	11 mm	24 mm	104 mm	203 mm	265 mm	257 mm	234 mm	353 mm	314 mm	139 mm	48 mm

Tây Ninh has a tropical monsoon climate with two seasons: a dry season from December to April and a rainy season from May to November. There are cooler and drier conditions in the dry season and warmer, more humid weather in the rainy season. Daytime temperatures range from 30–34 °C during the wet season and can exceed 38 °C in the dry season, with nighttime temperatures between 23–26 °C. Annual rainfall averages 1800 to 2200 mm. The region is less affected by typhoons from June to August due to its inland location and elevation behind the Trường Sơn Range. This climate is favorable for agricultural activities, including fruit cultivation, industrial crops, medicinal plants, and livestock farming.

== Economy ==
In 2016–18, the province reduced its rice and cassava growing areas and increased the cultivation of high-value fruits, according to the province's Department of Agriculture and Rural Development. The fruits include longan, grapefruit, durian, mango and soursop. During the period, the province's fruit growing area had a growth rate of 9.1% a year, taking the province's total fruit area to 20,212ha by the end of 2018. The province has about 1,300ha of fruits, including soursop, grapefruit, pineapple, banana and dragon fruit, which are grown under VietGAP standards.

Chairwoman of the National Assembly Nguyễn Thị Kim Ngân lauded Tây Ninh for its efforts in socioeconomic development, with the gross regional domestic product (GRDP) growing 8.5% in 2018 and the provincial competitiveness index ranked 14th out of the 63 cities and provinces, up 5 places from 2017. Alongside economic development, the province should pay attention to sustainable environmental protection, especially sewage and forest environment issues. Urging the locality to pay due attention to the fight against smuggling, trade fraud, and counterfeit goods through border gates, Prime Minister Nguyễn Xuân Phúc stressed the need to combine socioeconomic development with ensuring defense and security in border areas.

Tây Ninh province owns 9 industrial parks included the list of Vietnam industrial zone until 2015 and the vision of 2020, with a total natural land area of 4,485 ha. 5 IPs have been established including: Trang Bang IP (190ha), Linh Trung industrial and processing zone No. III (203ha); Bourbon An Hoa IP (760 ha), Phuoc Đong IP (2,190 ha), Cha La IP – phase I (42 ha), with a total natural land area of 3,385 ha, the industrial land area for lease to construct workshop is 2,162 ha.

In 2019, the Ministry of Transport, the Ho Chi Minh City People's Committee and the Tây Ninh provincial People's Committee held a conference in Ho Chi Minh City on October 26 to sign a coordination plan on the construction of the Ho Chi Minh City-Moc Bai highway. The highway, which is being implemented under a public-private partnership, will connect the city with Moc Bai International Border Gate in the southern province of Tay Ninh. The Moc Bai International Border Gate in Tây Ninh province has international exchanges with Cambodia and Thailand. National Road 22 is the only road linking HCM City with Mộc Bài. A survey conducted in 2017 showed that 39,700 vehicles traveled on the road each day, and that its designed loading capacity was 40,000 per day. Construction of the HCM City-Moc Bai Expressway is slated to be completed by 2025 with at least 4 lanes and expanded to 6 or 8 lanes by 2045.

== Demographics ==
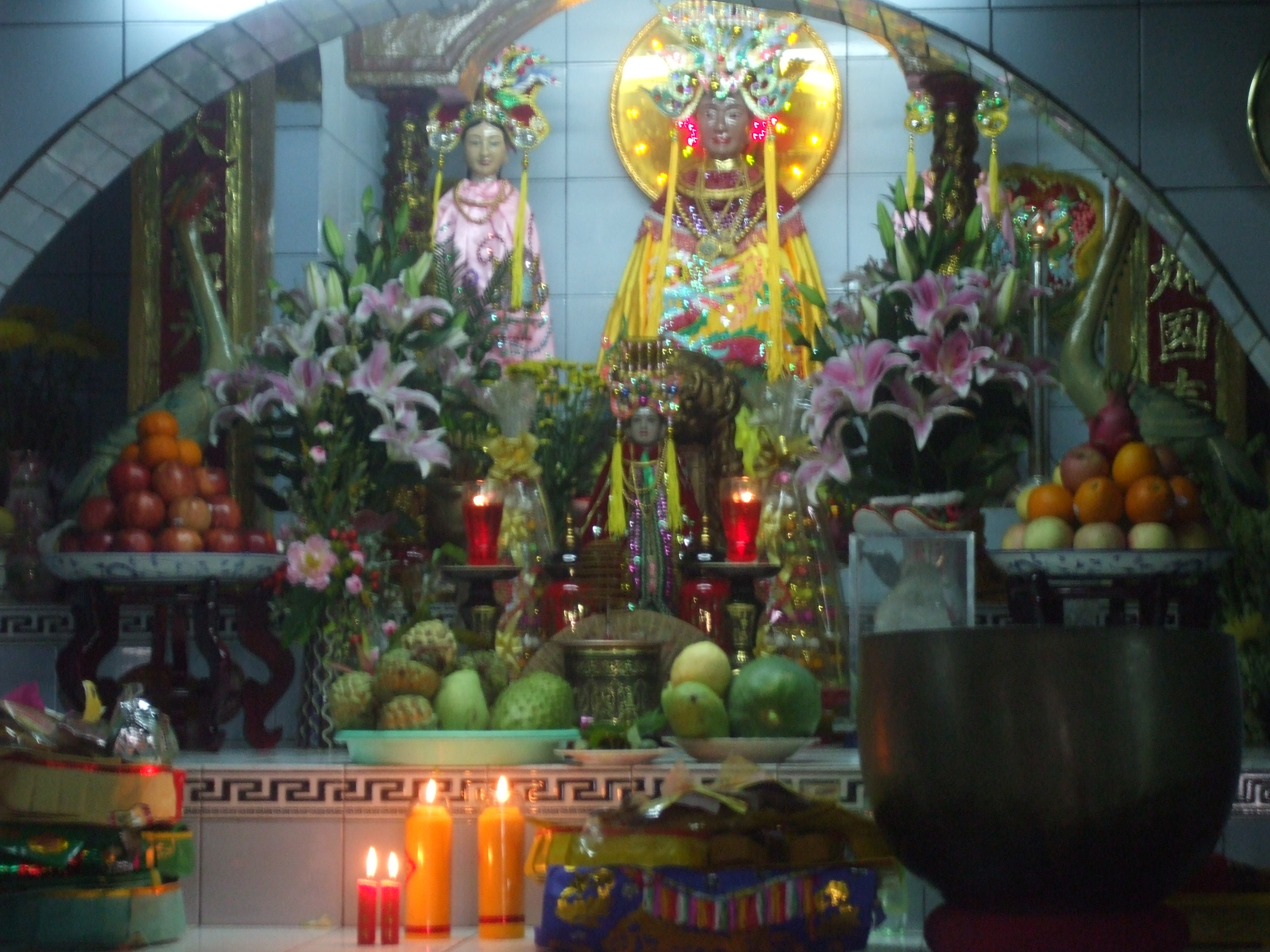
Altar of Ba Den Mountain

As of April 1, 2019, the total population of Tây Ninh province was 1,169,165 people, with a population density of 268 people per square kilometer. The urban population accounted for 207,569 people, representing 17.8% of the province's total population, while the rural population was 961,596 people, comprising 82.2% of the population. There were 584,180 males and 584,985 females. The natural population growth rate by locality was 0.92%.

As of April 1, 2019, Tây Ninh province had 9 different religious affiliations. The largest religious group was Caodaism with 415,920 followers, followed by Catholicism with 45,992 followers, and Buddhism with 38,336 followers. Other religions included Islam with 3,337 followers, Protestantism with 684 followers, Hoa Hao Buddhism with 236 followers, Minh Su Dao with 4 followers, Tinh do cu si Phat hoi Viet Nam with 2 followers, and Baháʼí with 1 follower.

According to the General Statistics Office of Vietnam, as of April 1, 2009, Tây Ninh province was home to 29 ethnic groups and foreign residents. Among them, the majority were the Kinh (Vietnamese) with 1,050,376 people, followed by the Khmer with 7,578 people, the Cham with 3,250 people, the Xtieng with 1,654 people, and the Hoa (ethnic Chinese) with 2,495 people. The remaining population consisted of other ethnic groups such as the Muong, Thai, Tay, and more.

== Festival ==
- Black Virgin Mountain Festival (from the 15th to the 18th day of the first lunar month; Via Ba Festival lasting from the 5th to the 6th day of the fifth lunar month)
- Hội Yến Diêu Trì (annually held in Tây Ninh Holy See or Cao Dai Holy See on the 15th of the eighth lunar month)
