= Sông Bé =

Sông Bé may refer to:

- Bé River, a river of southern Vietnam
- Sông Bé Bridge, a destroyed road bridge on the Bé, in Bình Dương province
- Sông Bé province, a former Vietnamese province named after the river
- Sông Bé Base Camp, a former U.S. Army and Army of the Republic of Vietnam (ARVN) base
  - Battle of Sông Bé, a major action between the Viet Cong and ARVN in May 1965
