= Hàm Thuận – Đa Mi hydroelectric power stations =

Dam in Hàm Thuận Bắc, Vietnam

Hàm Thuận
- Location within Vietnam
- Country: Vietnam
- Location: Hàm Thuận Bắc
- Coordinates: 11°19′34″N 107°56′01″E
- Status: Operational
- Construction began: 1997
- Opening date: 2001
- Owner: Vietnam Electricity

Dam and spillways
- Type of dam: Rockfill, center impervious core
- Impounds: La Ngà River
- Height: 93.5 m (307 ft)
- Length: 686 m (2,251 ft)

Reservoir
- Creates: Hàm Thuận Reservoir
- Total capacity: 695,000,000 m^{3} (563,000 acre⋅ft)
- Surface area: 25.2 km^{2} (9.7 sq mi)

Power Station
- Operator: Da Nhim – Ham Thuan – Da Mi Hydropower Joint Stock Co.
- Commission date: 2001
- Type: Conventional
- Turbines: 2 X 150 MW
- Installed capacity: 300 MW (Hàm Thuận)

Đa Mi
- Interactive map of Đa Mi
- Country: Vietnam
- Location: Hàm Thuận Bắc
- Coordinates: 11°14′22″N 107°50′17″E
- Status: Operational
- Construction began: 1997
- Opening date: 2001
- Owner: Vietnam Electricity

Dam and spillways
- Type of dam: Rockfill
- Impounds: Đa Mi River
- Height: 72 m (236 ft)

Reservoir
- Creates: Đa Mi Reservoir
- Total capacity: 141,000,000 m^{3} (114,000 acre⋅ft)

Power Station
- Operator: Da Nhim – Ham Thuan – Da Mi Hydropower Joint Stock Co.
- Commission date: 2001
- Type: Conventional
- Turbines: 2
- Installed capacity: 175 MW

The Hàm Thuận – Đa Mi Hydroelectric Power Complex is a cascade of two hydroelectric power stations in Hàm Thuận Bắc District of the central region of Vietnam. It is operated by Da Nhim – Ham Thuan – Da Mi Hydropower Joint Stock Co., a subsidiary of Vietnam Electricity. The same company also operates the older Đa Nhim Hydroelectric Power Station.

== History ==
A feasibility study of the project was conducted by the Vietnamese government in 1991. Construction began in 1997 and both stations were opened in 2001. The main contractors of the project were Tomen Corporation, Ansaldo Energia, Fuji Electric, Hitachi Zosen Corporation, SsangYong, Hyundai Corporation, Maeda Corporation, Kumagai Gumi, Astaldi, Kukdong Engineering & Construction Co Ltd., and Nissho Iwai Corporation. Consulting services were provided by Electric Power Development Company and Nippon Koei. The project cost ¥70.145 million, of which 59.623 million was borrowed from the Japan Bank for International Cooperation.

== Hàm Thuận ==
The Hàm Thuận dams are located on the La Ngà River and consist of one main dam and four auxiliary dams. The main dam is a rockfill, center impervious core type of dam. Its height is 93.5 metres (307 ft) and length is 686 metres (2,251 ft). Auxiliary dams are of the earthfill homogeneous type. The Hàm Thuận dams create the Hàm Thuận reservoir with a surface area of 25.2 square kilometres (9.7 sq mi) and active capacity of 523,000,000 cubic metres (424,000 acre⋅ft). The maximum capacity is 695,000,000 cubic metres (563,000 acre⋅ft). The main dam is located at 11°19′34″N 107°56′1″E and the power station is located at 11°17′18″N 107°52′19″E.

The Hàm Thuận power station has an installed capacity of 300 MW. It consists of two units with a capacity of 150 MW each.

== Đa Mi ==
The Đa Mi Dam impounds the La Nga River approximately 2 km south of the Đa Mi lake. The main dam is a 72-metre (236 ft) high rockfill dam and it creates the Đa Mi Reservoir with a maximum capacity of 141,000,000 cubic metres (114,000 acre⋅ft). The reservoir is daily regulated from the Hàm Thuận Reservoir, approximately 6 km further North-East. The main dam is located at 11°14′22″N 107°50′17″E.

The Đa Mi power station is located 10 kilometres (6.2 mi) downstream from Hàm Thuận station at 11°13′9″N 107°50′1″E. The power station has an installed capacity of 175 MW, consisting of two units each with a capacity of 87.5 MW.

The complex also provides water to the Trị An Hydroelectric Power Station downstream of the Đa Mi power station along the La Nga River: near to where it originally joined the Đồng Nai river.
