= Dầu Tiếng Reservoir =

Artificial lake in the Southeast region, Vietnam

Coordinates: 11°25′18″N 106°18′48″E

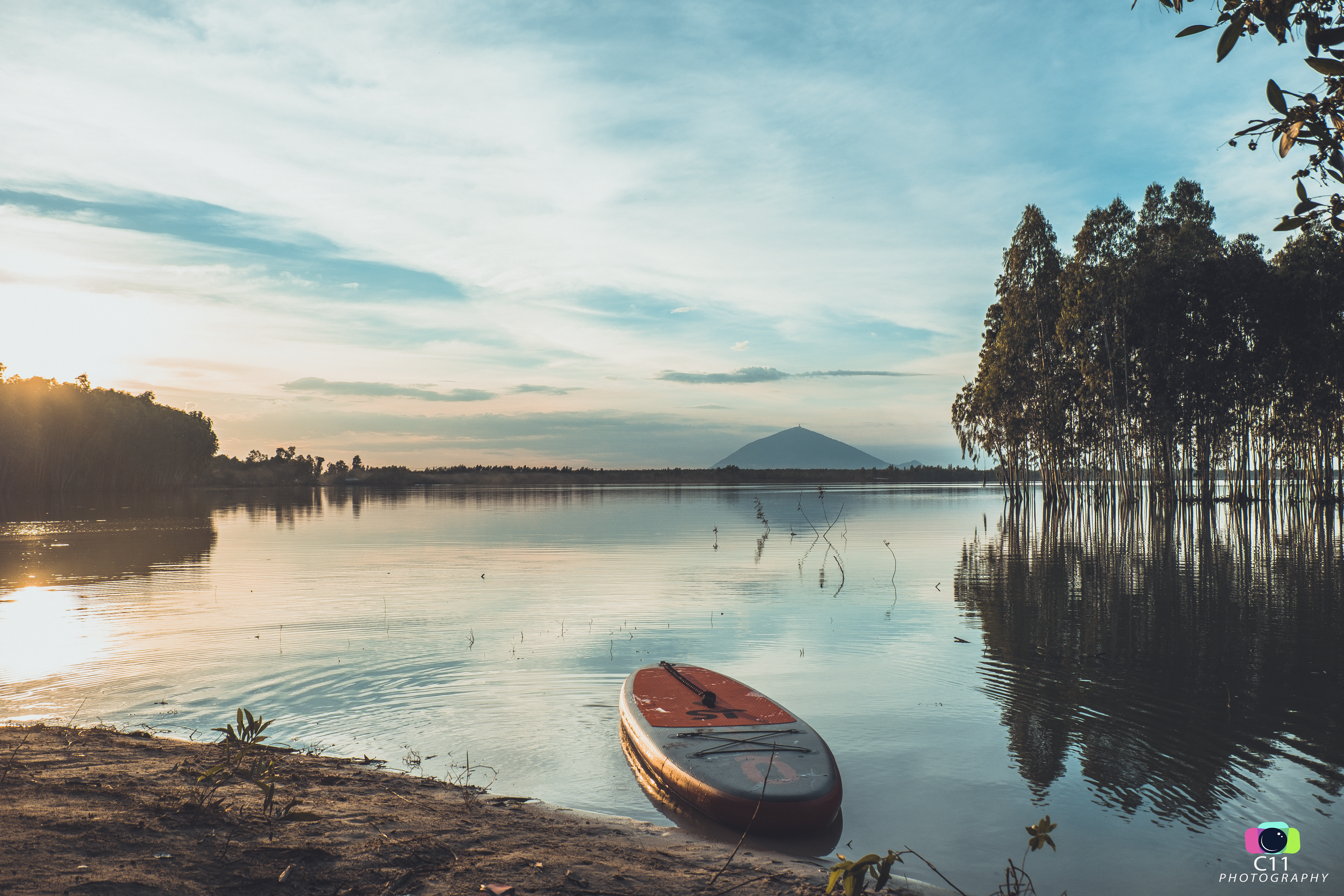
A corner of Dầu Tiếng Reservoir

Satellite image of Dầu Tiếng Reservoir

Dầu Tiếng Reservoir is a reservoir located among three provinces / muninicpality of Tây Ninh province, Ho Chi Minh City (formerly Bình Dương province), and Đồng Nai province (previous Bình Phước province previously) in the Southeast region of Vietnam. The lake was formed by damming the upper reaches of the Saigon River, making it the largest irrigation reservoir in Vietnam and Southeast Asia. Construction of the lake began in 1981 after surveys were conducted starting in 1976. The project was completed with over 100 million USD in funding, which the Vietnamese government borrowed from the World Bank, making it the first project in Vietnam to be built using US dollars since the Reunification of Vietnam on April 30, 1975.

Before construction, the lake's development sparked considerable debate among the leaders of Tây Ninh province regarding the choice of the lake's name and the project's feasibility. Nevertheless, the construction proceeded. Since 2017, Dầu Tiếng Reservoir has been classified as a project of national security importance due to concerns that a dam breach would affect the Ho Chi Minh City metropolitan area. As of 2022, Dầu Tiếng Reservoir is managed by the Southern Irrigation Exploitation One Member Limited Liability Company (Note: Formerly known as Dầu Tiếng – Phước Hòa Irrigation Exploitation One Member Limited Liability Company, headquartered at Hamlet B2, Phước Minh Commune, Dầu Tiếng District, Tây Ninh Province. However, after the name change, the company's headquarters moved to 178 Nguyễn Văn Thương, Ward 25, Bình Thạnh, Ho Chi Minh City.) under the management of the Ministry of Agriculture and Rural Development.

In 2005, along with Black Virgin Mountain, Dầu Tiếng Reservoir was selected to appear in the central part of the logo of Tây Ninh province.

== Overview ==
Dầu Tiếng Reservoir spans across four districts: Dầu Tiếng (Bình Dương Province; also where the lake was named after), Dương Minh Châu, Tân Châu (Tây Ninh Province), and Hớn Quản (Bình Phước Province) with a surface area of up to 270 km² and a total capacity of 1.58 billion m³ of water. The lake is located 20 km northeast of Tây Ninh City and 70 km north of Ho Chi Minh City. Formed by damming the upper reaches of the Saigon River, its main purpose is to regulate water flow into the Saigon River and provide irrigation for over 100,000 hectares of agricultural land in Tây Ninh and neighboring provinces such as Bình Dương, Bình Phước, Long An and Ho Chi Minh City. The Dầu Tiếng irrigation system consists of three main canals: East Canal (Kênh chính Đông), West Canal (Kênh chính Tây), and Tân Hưng Canal (Kênh chính Tân Hưng), which distribute water through over 1,550 km of branch canals in various localities. Additionally, the lake is used by local residents for aquaculture.

The project is regulating water to serve 93,000 hectares of land in Tây Ninh, including the districts of Tân Biên, Châu Thành, Bến Cầu, Dương Minh Châu, Gò Dầu, the town of Hòa Thành, Trảng Bàng, and the city of Tây Ninh; in Củ Chi district, Ho Chi Minh City; and in Đức Hòa district, Long An province.

== History ==
=== Survey ===
After the unification of Vietnam in 1975, the government of the Socialist Republic of Vietnam decided to establish the Southern Irrigation Design Survey Team. Initial maps of the land for planning were adapted from the 1:100,000 maps of the Republic of Vietnam government. In 1976, Phạm Hùng, the Deputy Prime Minister of Vietnam, launched the movement "The entire population and army to undertake irrigation works" with the philosophy that "Irrigation is the foremost measure to rejuvenate the country." During this period, many officials from the North were sent to the South to survey and construct the lake, including Nguyễn Xuân Hùng from the Survey Design Institute (Ministry of Water Resources), who was the chief designer of the project. During the survey, seven officials died after stepping on mines in what is now the lake area. Before the official construction, some rubber plantation owners had intended to build a lake in the area for recreational purposes.

Before the official construction, many auxiliary dams were built by the Vietnamese military starting in 1977.

=== Construction ===
The Dầu Tiếng irrigation project was approved by the Prime Minister in 1979 and commenced construction on April 29, 1981, with a total investment of 110 million USD at Thuận Bình hamlet, Truông Mít commune, Dương Minh Châu district, Tây Ninh province, in the presence of Deputy Prime Minister Huỳnh Tấn Phát. At that time, the project faced opposition from Tây Ninh province leaders due to land concerns, as two-thirds of the lake's area was in Tây Ninh, but it was named after Dầu Tiếng, a location in Bình Dương. The opposition was so strong that Nguyễn Văn Tốt, the then-Secretary of Tây Ninh province, instructed all provincial agencies not to receive the Ministry of Water Resources or discuss the Dầu Tiếng project, including the Chairman of the Provincial People's Committee. According to Nông nghiệp newspaper, Minister of Water Resources Nguyễn Thanh Bình was even accused by Tốt to the Central Secretariat of fearing sabotage by the CIA. To placate Tây Ninh, Prime Minister Phạm Hùng named the lake Dầu Tiếng – Tây Ninh. However, Đặng Văn Thượng, the Deputy Secretary of the Provincial Party Committee and Chairman of the Provincial People's Committee of Tây Ninh, supported the project. At its peak, the construction involved up to 36,300 workers, with a minimum of 7,200 workers. Despite the initial opposition from the province, the project saw "significant contributions from the youth and people of Tây Ninh" after Thượng and his officials mobilized the public to dig canals and build the lake.

The capital for constructing the reservoir is said to have come from a preferential loan of over US$100 million from the World Bank, which was chaired at the time by Robert Strange McNamara. McNamara was a former United States Secretary of Defense and considered the "chief architect" of the Vietnam War. This was also the first loan successfully secured by the State of the Socialist Republic of Vietnam, making this project the first to be constructed with US dollars after 1975. The construction workforce at that time consisted of young people, with the number reaching tens of thousands at its peak. According to statistics from the Tay Ninh provincial youth union, by the time the project was put into operation, Tay Ninh and neighboring provinces and cities had mobilized over 450,000 youth members, completed nearly 15 million workdays, excavated more than 11.6 million cubic meters of earth, and constructed nearly 54,000 cubic meters of concrete and masonry, building thousands of kilometers of canals and thousands of structures along the canals. The reservoir was also built in the context of Vietnam being Khmer Rouge attacked on its border by Cambodia.

To obtain the vast area in 1982, thousands of households in Lộc Ninh commune, Dương Minh Châu district, gave up their land and moved to new residences in the Truông Mít and Bến Củi communes. On July 2, 1984, the reservoir began storing water, and on January 10, 1985, the Dầu Tiếng irrigation system with its two main canals, East and West, officially started operation. In 1985, right at the construction site, Thân Công Khởi, a former operator of a self-propelled scraper who participated in building the main dam and later the West canal (one of the two main arteries of the Dầu Tiếng reservoir), was awarded the title of Hero of Labor by the Chairman of the State Council Trường Chinh. He was the only person among the half a million workers to receive this title. During the 1985–1986 period, the reservoir was substantially completed to deliver water to Củ Chi district, with an annual flow of about 135 million cubic meters of water. From 1996 to 1999, the Tân Hưng canal was constructed to direct water from the Dầu Tiếng reservoir to irrigate the southern communes of the two districts Tân Châu and Tân Biên. In 2012, the Phước Hòa irrigation reservoir and canal system became operational, transferring water from the Bé River to the Sài Gòn River, thereby supplementing the water for the Dầu Tiếng Reservoir. Thus, this is an irrigation project that transfers water from one river to another, with one reservoir replenishing another.

=== Activities ===
Since June 6, 2017, the Prime Minister and the Ministry of Public Security have deployed officials to Tay Ninh to decide to include the Dau Tieng water reservoir project in the list of important projects related to national security. By June 2019, the first solar power plant was established on the submerged area within the Dau Tieng reservoir. Upon completion, the plant became the largest clean energy project in Southeast Asia. In 2021, the Ministry of Agriculture and Rural Development assigned the reservoir's management company to implement a project to invest in, repair, and enhance the safety of the dam and water reservoir, with a budget of 157 billion dong, completed in 2022 after detecting cracks. The company also proposed an investment of 1,500 billion dong for repair and upgrade from 2021 to 2025. During the second phase of repairs, the Southern Water Irrigation Company cut off water for 90 days to the West main canal with the approval of the Tay Ninh People's Committee, extending from April 5, 2023, and resumed water flow on January 10, 2024, to serve the new agricultural season.

In 2024, Prime Minister Phạm Minh Chính assigned Tây Ninh to leverage the functions provided by the Dau Tieng reservoir. Previously, the province was tasked with developing the comprehensive multi-objective project "Dau Tieng Development Master Plan Phase 2022–2030, Vision 2050," which was later cancelled due to exceeding the province's authority in various laws, sectors, and planning aspects.

== Exploitation ==
=== Tourism ===
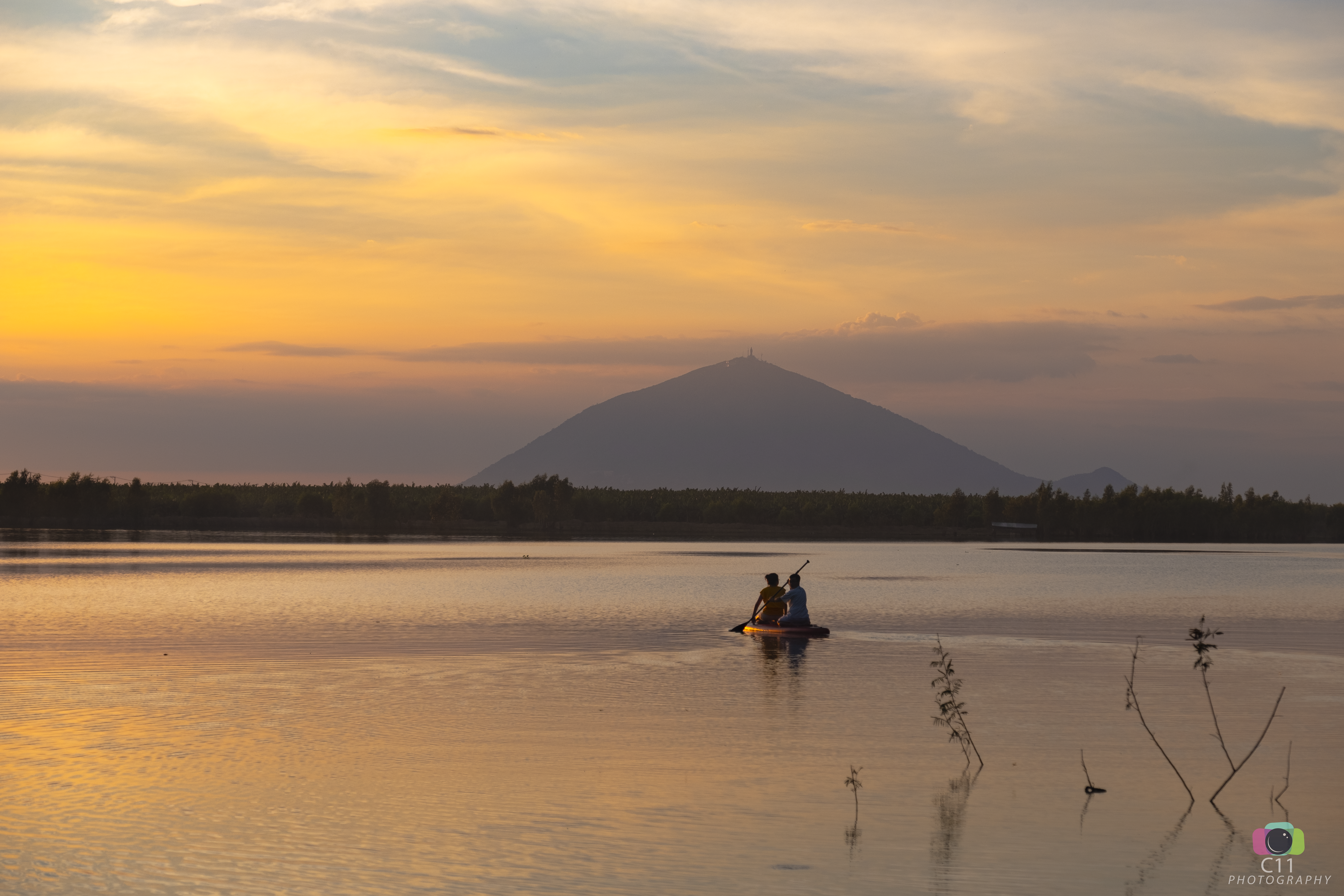
Dầu Tiếng Reservoir in the evening with Bà Đen Mountain in the background.

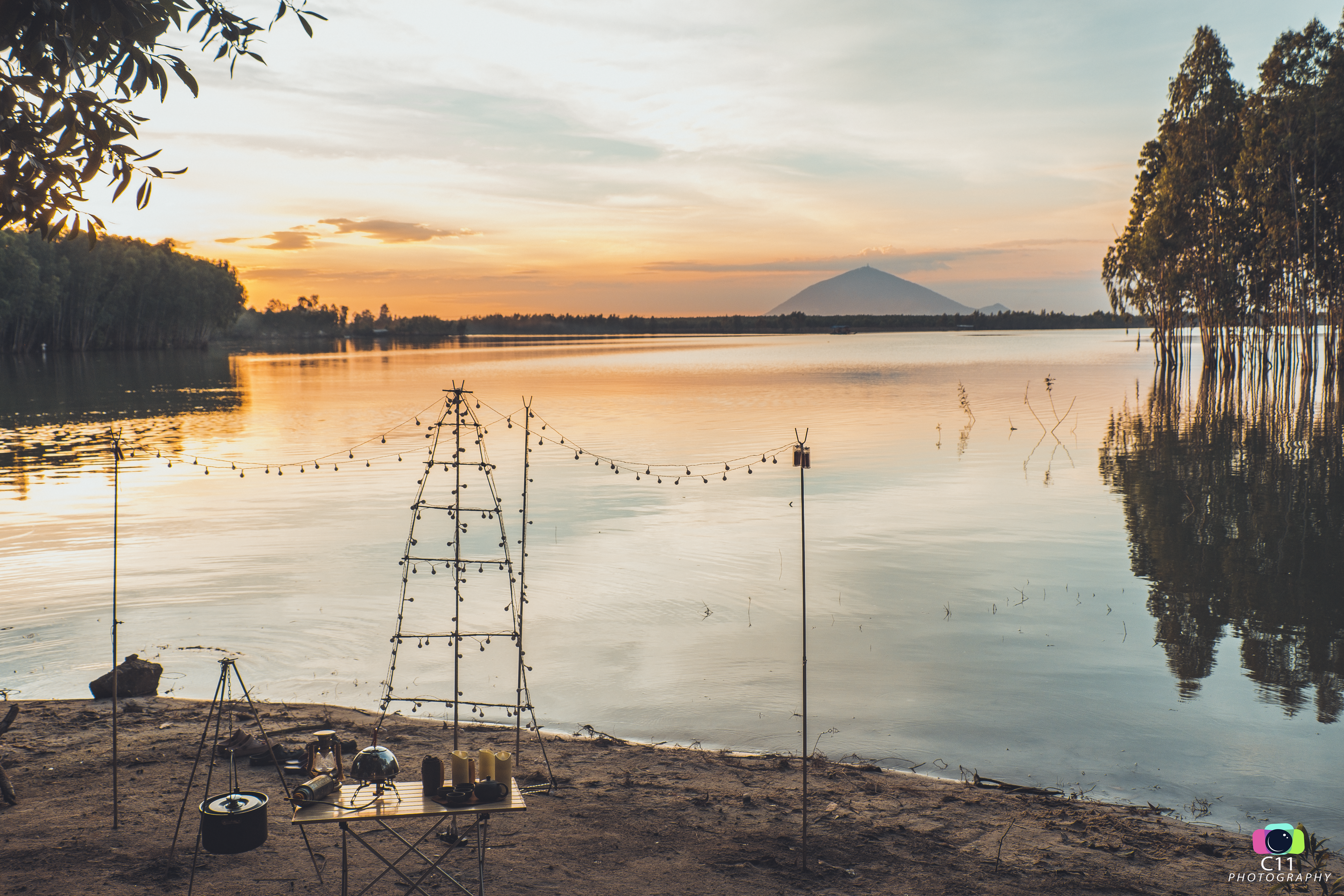
The shore of Dầu Tiếng Reservoir.

In 2008, the Tây Ninh Provincial People's Committee called for investment in tourism areas within the lake, including Nhím Island, Sỉn Islet, Tân Thiết Islet, Tân Hòa Islet, Bà Chiêm Islet, Tà Dơ Islet, Đồng Kèn Islet, and along the southern shore of the lake. In 2022, the Bình Dương Provincial People's Committee held a meeting to hear the consulting unit's report on the Ecotourism, Resort, and Recreation Project for the Núi Cậu (Cậu Mount) – Dầu Tiếng Protective Forest for the period 2021 – 2030, envisioning it as a "miniature Đà Lạt."

In 2016, many residents discovered an impromptu beach area in the Dầu Tiếng Reservoir area. Shortly thereafter, local authorities requested that residents dismantle and move out of the lake area as it was unregulated, posing potential security and drowning risks. By the end of May of the same year, the Tây Ninh Provincial People's Committee assigned relevant units to invest in infrastructure and transform the area into a natural beach named "Tây Ninh Sea.".

In 2022, under the management of the Tây Ninh Provincial Department of Culture, Sports, and Tourism, the Paragliding and Kite Flying Sports Federation was established. The launch event and paragliding performance were held at the Dầu Tiếng Reservoir area in Dương Minh Châu District, Tây Ninh province, over two days, April 30 and May 1. As part of Tây Ninh province's urban development plan, Dương Minh Châu has been approved to become a tourism service development area surrounding Bà Đen Mountain and Dầu Tiếng Reservoir.

=== Fisheries ===
According to a survey conducted by the Livestock and Veterinary Bureau under the Tây Ninh Department of Agriculture and Rural Development, Dầu Tiếng Reservoir is home to more than 50 fish species, including 10 economically valuable species such as featherback fish, catfish, snakehead fish, and anchovy. However, according to statistics from the Institute of Fisheries II under the Ministry of Agriculture and Rural Development, the lake hosts around 60 fish species and numerous other aquatic species, with 15 species providing economic value such as carp, climbing perch, mystus fish, and catfish. Species belonging to the carp family are reported to account for about 33.33%, catfish family 30%, goby family 23.33%, and various other fish species. Since its construction, the number of fish species in the lake has increased by 14 compared to the upstream Saigon River, with 33 new species appearing and 19 species disappearing. The vanished aquatic species include climbing perch, fire snakehead, gourami, barred mystus, herring, giant gourami, and notably, giant freshwater prawn. The appearance of many other fish species is attributed to local residents farming various economically valuable fish in cages and pens. From 2005 to 2013, 7.8 million fish were released into the lake by local authorities to replenish the aquatic resources.

According to the Tây Ninh newspaper, the province annually allocates a budget of 500–700 million VND to release tens of millions of fish fry into Dau Tieng Lake to replenish aquatic resources. However, local authorities report that many fishermen in the lake have been using prohibited fishing gear such as stacked cages, gillnets, electrofishing, and light-attracting devices, causing severe damage to the lake's ecosystem. On March 25, 2024, the Southern Irrigation Exploitation One Member Limited Liability Company established a "Plan for coordinated inspection of activities within the protection scope of Dau Tieng irrigation works", which includes inspecting fishing gear and cage fish farming around the lake to protect the ecosystem and aquatic resources.

=== Irrigation ===
The Dau Tieng – Phuoc Hoa irrigation system, under the management of the Southern Irrigation Exploitation One Member Limited Liability Company, serves to provide water, control floods, repel salinity, and improve the environment for the downstream areas of the Saigon and Vam Co Dong river basins. The reservoir is currently the direct source of water for production for 116,953 hectares in the provinces and cities of Tay Ninh (92,953 ha), Ho Chi Minh City (12,000 ha), and Long An (12,000 ha); it also provides irrigation for 93,954 hectares along the Saigon and Vam Co Dong rivers. In 2017, Dinh La Thang proposed restarting the pipeline project connecting Dau Tieng Lake to the water plant in Ho Chi Minh City by calling for socialized investment. In 2018, the Tay Ninh government commenced construction of a project to bring water from Dau Tieng Lake to the west of the Vam Co Dong River to supply water to communes in Chau Thanh and Ben Cau districts of Tay Ninh province with a total investment of 1,246 billion VND. The project includes a steel pipe crossing the river with a span of 30 meters and a static clearance height of about 6 meters.

During the 2024 heatwave in Vietnam, Long An province requested the Southern Irrigation Exploitation One Member Limited Liability Company to release water from Dau Tieng Lake into the Vam Co Dong River to push back saltwater intrusion after the province declared a level 4 drought and salinity disaster on April 17. The company agreed and committed to releasing 7 million cubic meters of water through the Vam Co Dong River to support Long An. However, the Department of Agriculture and Rural Development of Long An province later requested the reservoir to increase the discharge rate to further assist the province. Previously, the reservoir had also released water to prevent saltwater intrusion in the Saigon River and the Dong Nai river system.

=== Minerals ===
In 2010, the People's Committee of Tay Ninh province agreed with Binh Phuoc province in Official Letter No. 1968 to hand over the licensing of mineral exploitation in the 16 km upstream area of the Saigon River, which is co-managed by the two provinces, to the People's Committee of Binh Phuoc province. Upon handing it over to Binh Phuoc, Tay Ninh stated that it would only coordinate management when necessary. Two months after the official letter took effect, Binh Phuoc granted the sole license to Thai Thinh Private Enterprise for sand exploitation for a period of 10 years. However, in 2017, this license was transferred to Phu Tho Production and Trading One Member Limited Liability Company. Subsequently, residents of Tan Hoa, Tan Chau reported to Tay Ninh province about serious erosion on the Tay Ninh side. Upon inspection, Thai Thinh Company had caused 150 meters of erosion into Tan Hoa territory without deploying buoys or mining signs. According to Tay Ninh provincial authorities, due to the vast area of the lake and the absence of residents in many areas, detecting illegal mineral exploitation within the lake is extremely difficult.

== Sources ==
- Ban Chấp hành Trung ương Đảng (1985). Tạp chí cộng sản 5 (tháng 5 năm 1985) (in Vietnamese). Vietnam: Đảng cộng sản Việt Nam.
- Trần Mạnh Thường (2005). Việt Nam - Văn hóa và du lịch (in Vietnamese). Vietnam: Nhà xuất bản Thông Tấn. OCLC 951290475.
