= Saigon River =

River in Southern Vietnam

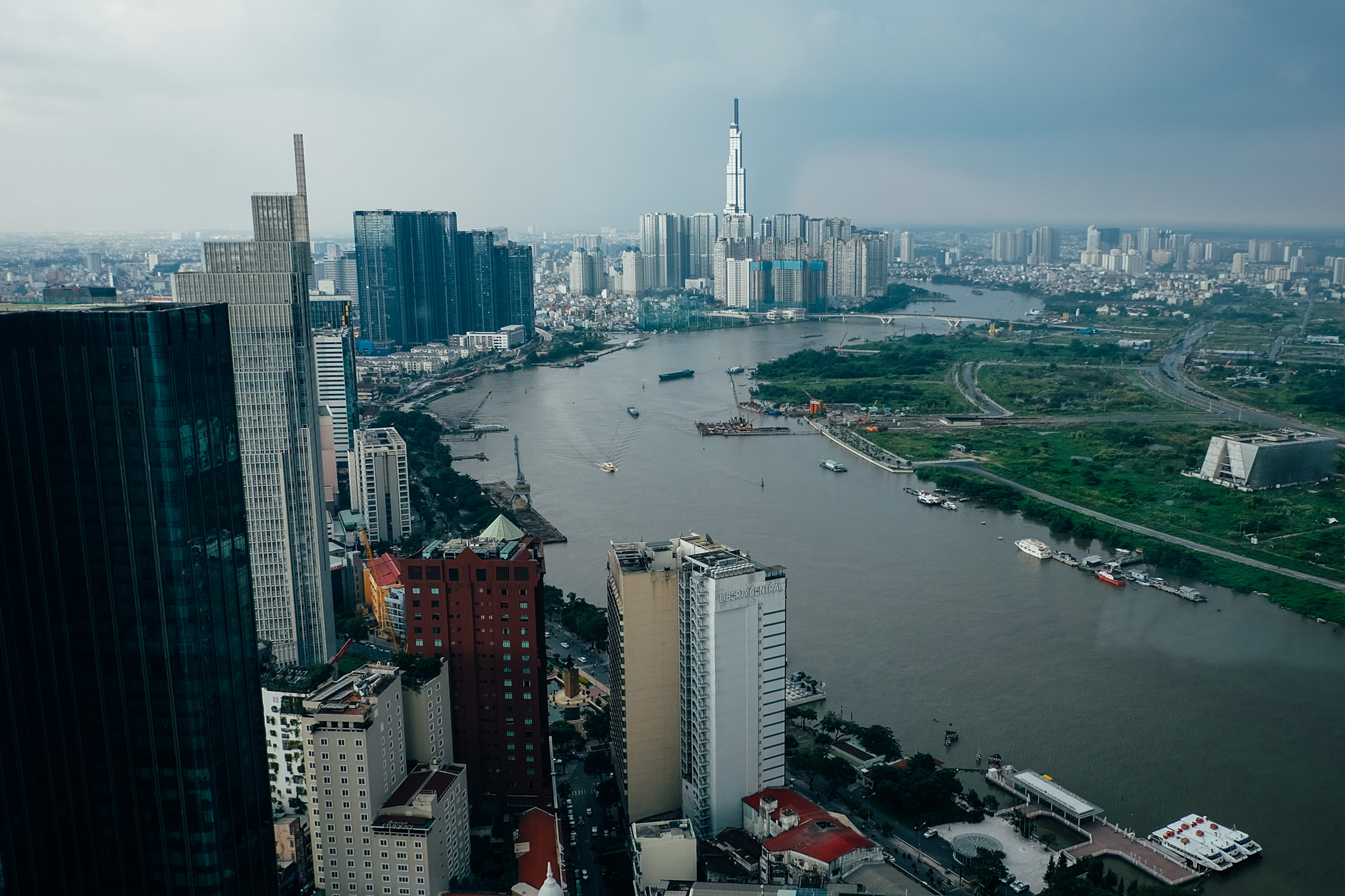
- View of the Saigon River in Ho Chi Minh City

- Location within Vietnam
- Native name: Sông Sài Gòn (Vietnamese)

Location
- Country: Vietnam
- Province: Đồng Nai, Tây Ninh, Ho Chi Minh City

Physical characteristics
- Source: Tonlé Chàm
  - location: Lộc Ninh district
- Mouth: Nhà Bè River
  - location: Red Light Cape, District 7, Ho Chi Minh City
  - coordinates: 10°44′38″N 106°45′33″E
- Length: 251 km (156 mi)
- Basin size: 4,788 square kilometres (1,849 sq mi)

The Saigon River (Vietnamese: Sông Sài Gòn) is a river located in southern Vietnam that rises near Phum Daung in southeastern Cambodia, flows south and southeast for about 230 km (140 mi) and empties into the Nhà Bè River, which in turn empties into the South China Sea some 20 km (12 mi) northeast of the Mekong Delta.

During 1981–1985, a dam was constructed across the river, just north of the town of Dầu Tiếng, to form the Dầu Tiếng Reservoir for irrigation purposes. Saigon River is joined, southeast of downtown Ho Chi Minh City (Saigon) by the Đồng Nai River. The river is important to Ho Chi Minh City as its main water supply as well as the host of Saigon Port, with a total cargo volume loaded and outloaded of more than 35 million metric tons in 2006.

The Bình Quới Tourist Village is located on the Thanh Đa peninsula on the Saigon River, in the Bình Thạnh District of Ho Chi Minh City.

The Saigon River Tunnel running under the river, connecting District 1 in the west to the Thủ Thiêm new urban area in the east, was opened to traffic on November 20, 2011. Since its completion, it has been the longest cross-river tunnel in Southeast Asia. The river is also crossed by bridges, some notable ones are the Thu Thiem Bridge, Ba Son Bridge, and Phu My Bridge.

The Saigon Waterbus service launched in 2017, connecting District 1 with Thu Duc District.

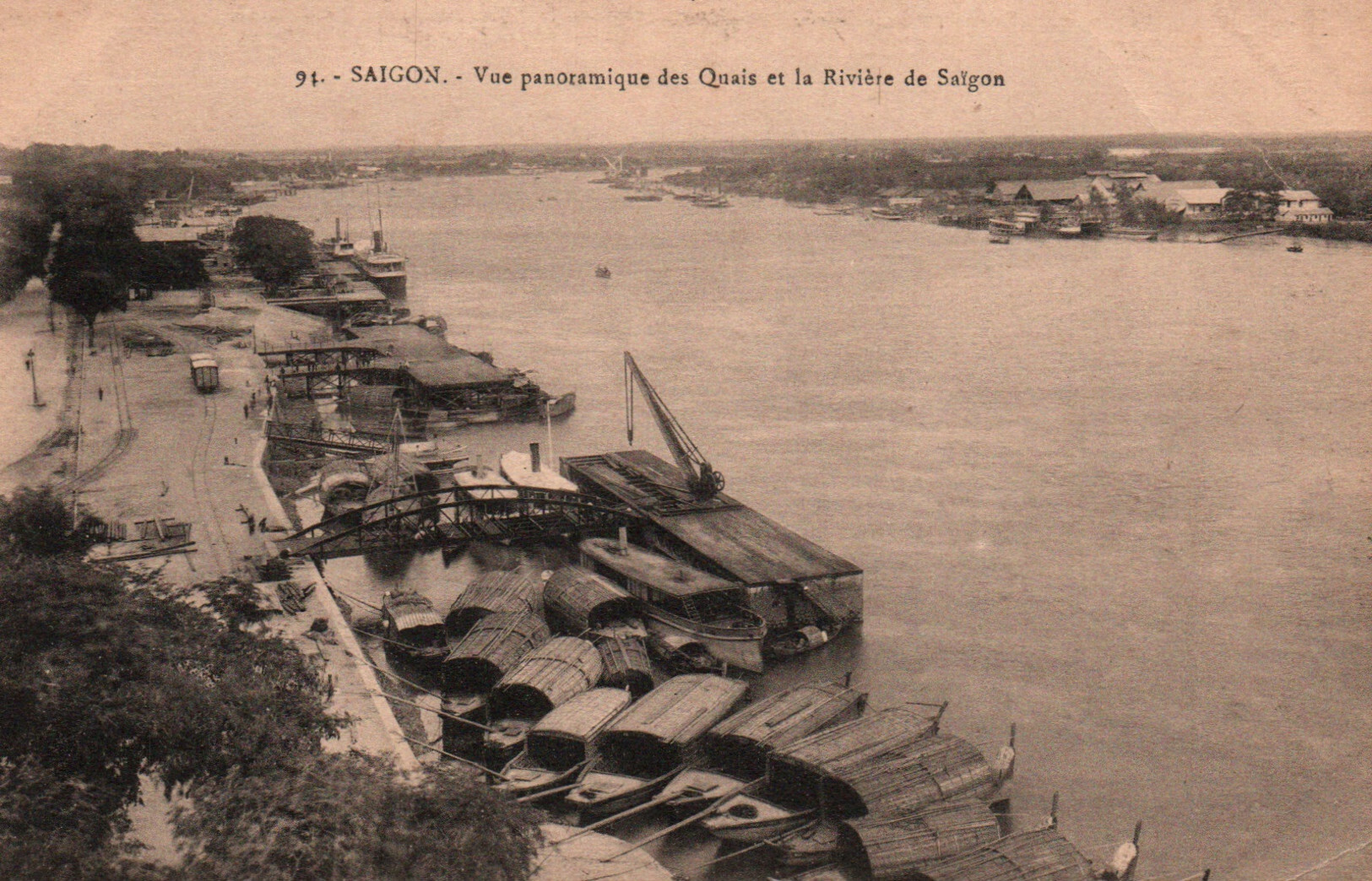
View of the river in early 20th century

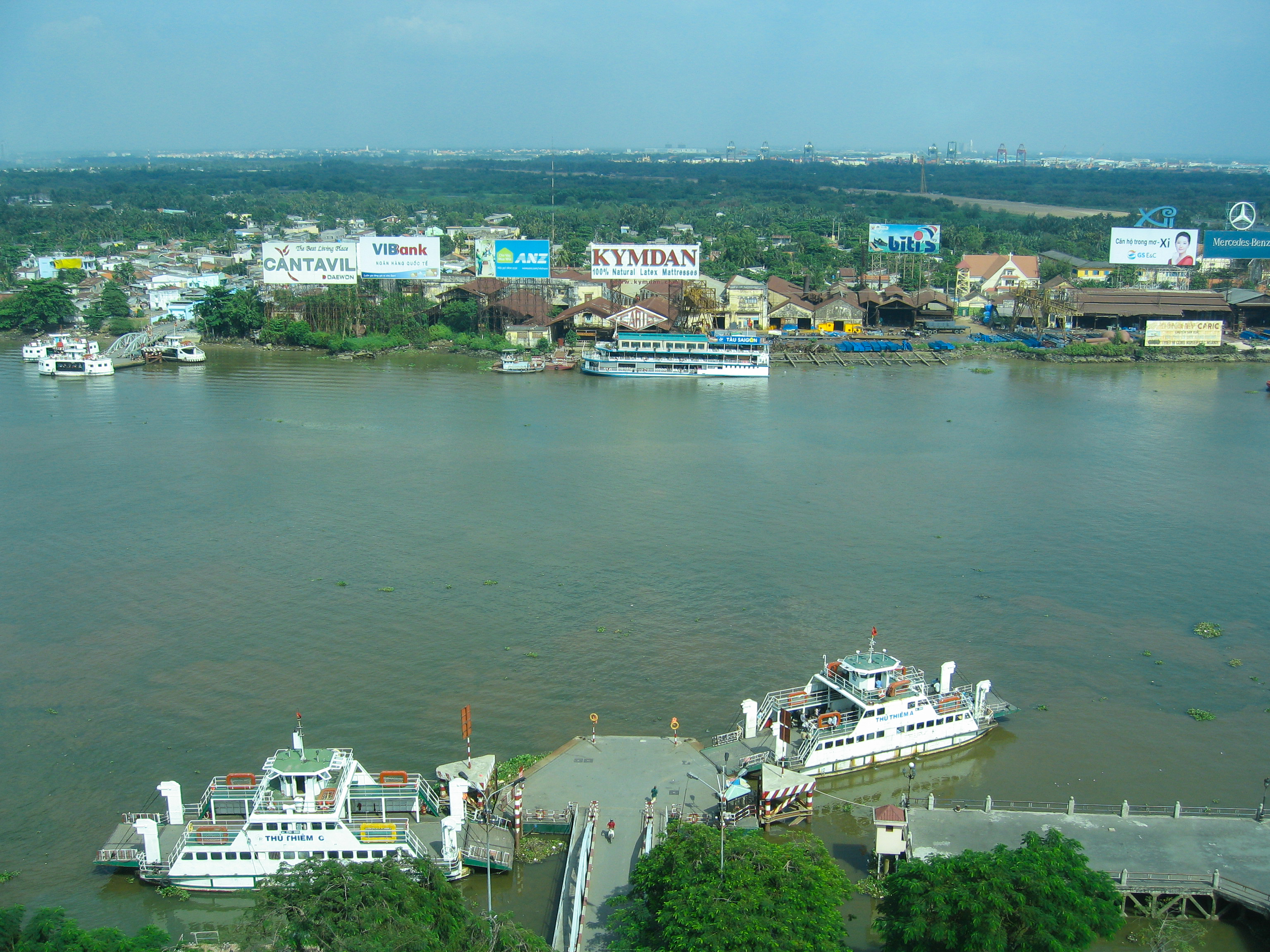
The Thủ Thiêm ferry crossing on Saigon river, which stopped operating in 2012 and now is Thủ Thiêm Pier of Saigon Waterbus

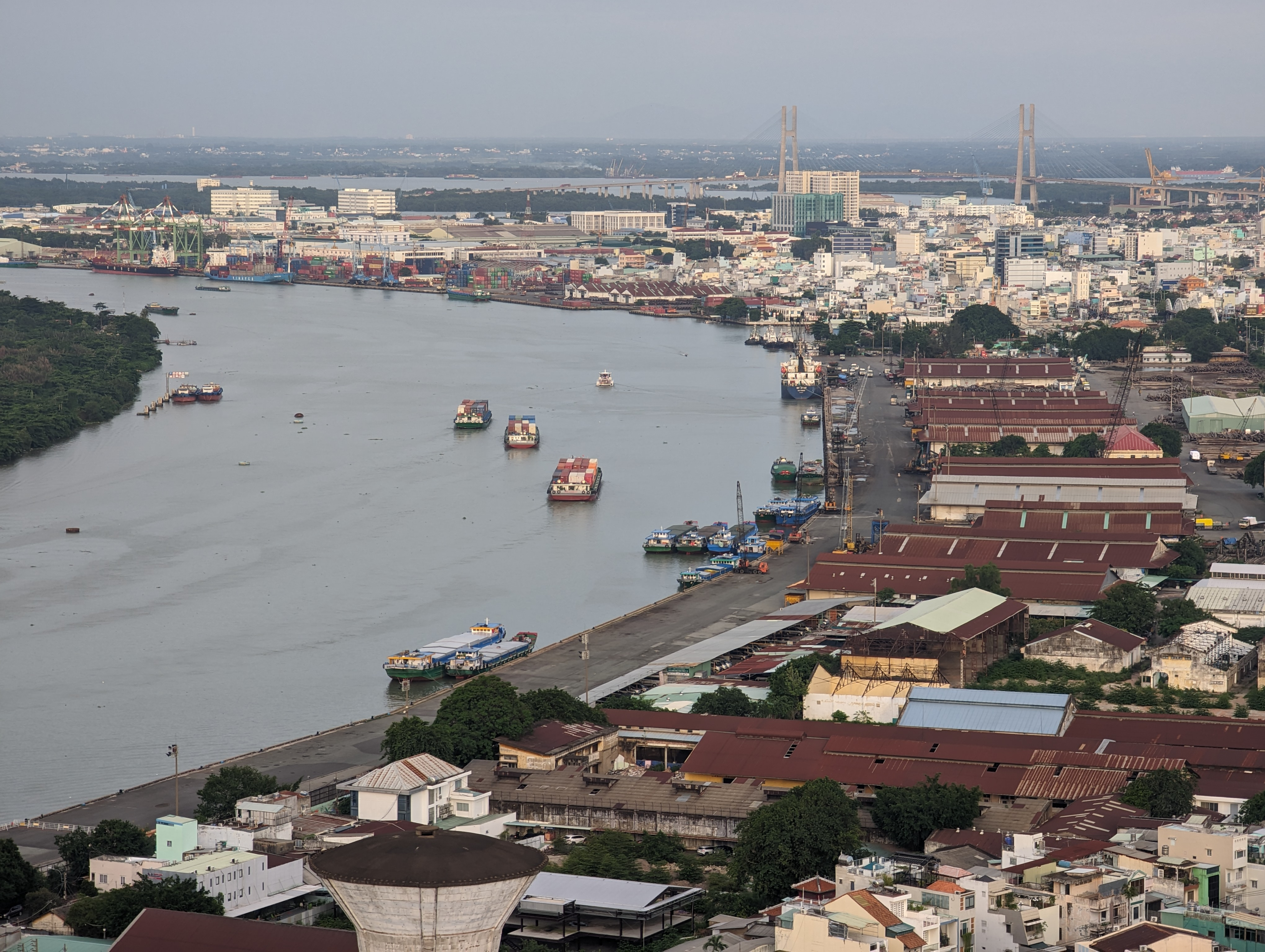
Port of Saigon in District 4, Ho Chi Minh City

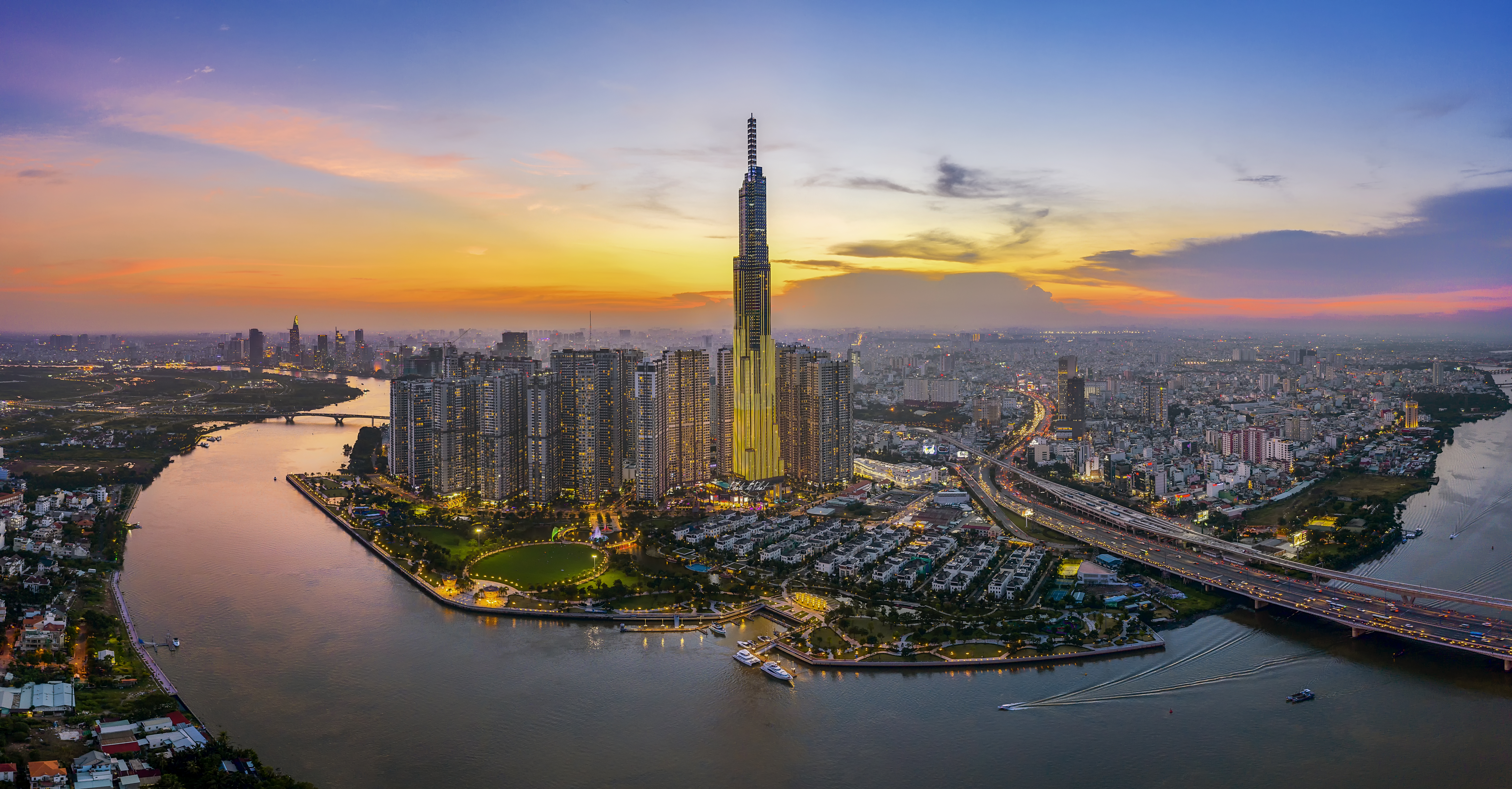
View of the river in Bình Thạnh district, with the Landmark 81 in the center

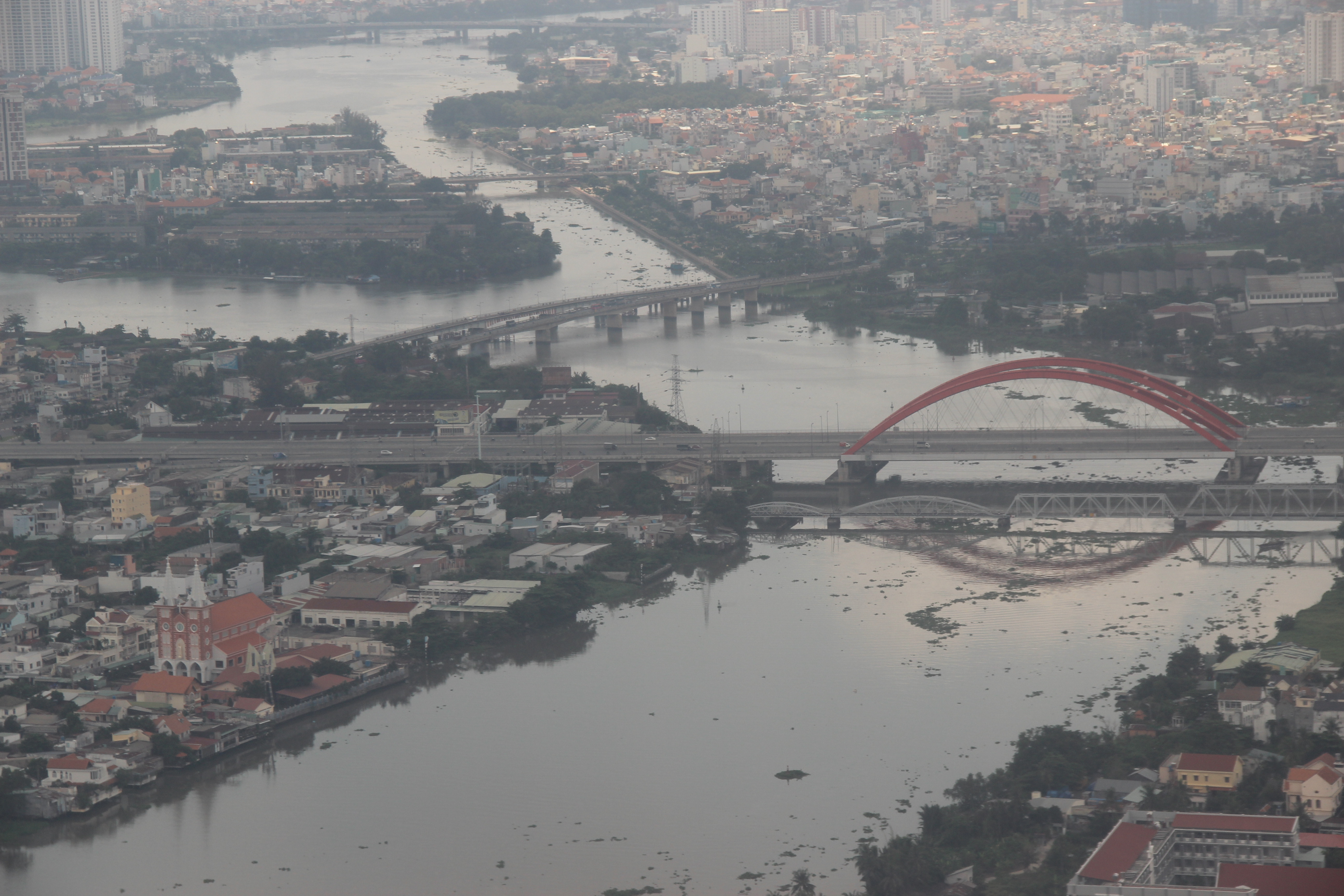
Saigon River and the Thanh Đa Canal

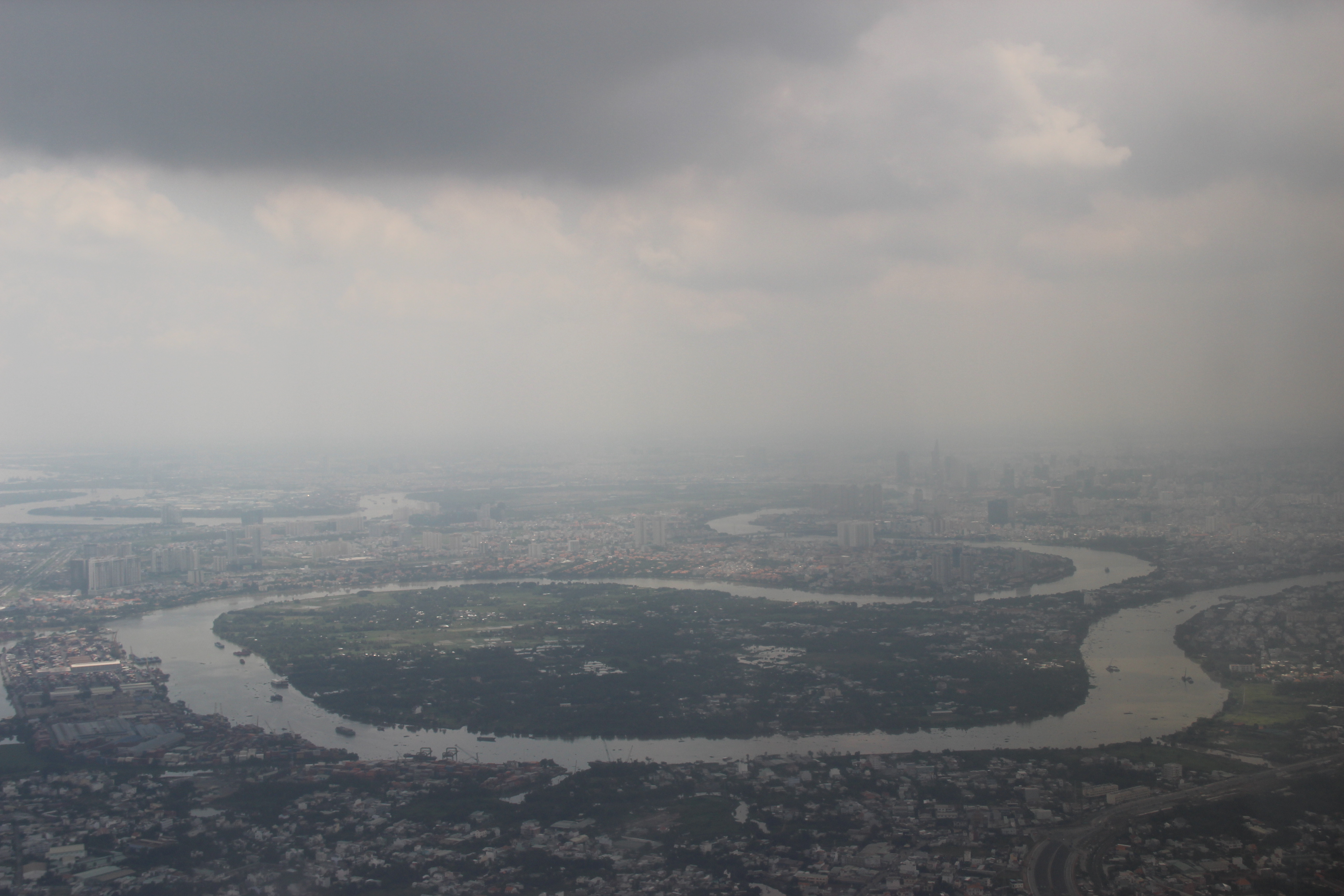
View of the river at the northern area of Bình Quới Peninsula of Ho Chi Minh City, adjacent to Thảo Điền, Trường Thọ, An Phú, Thủ Đức and the former place of Saigon Water Park next to Gò Dưa Canal

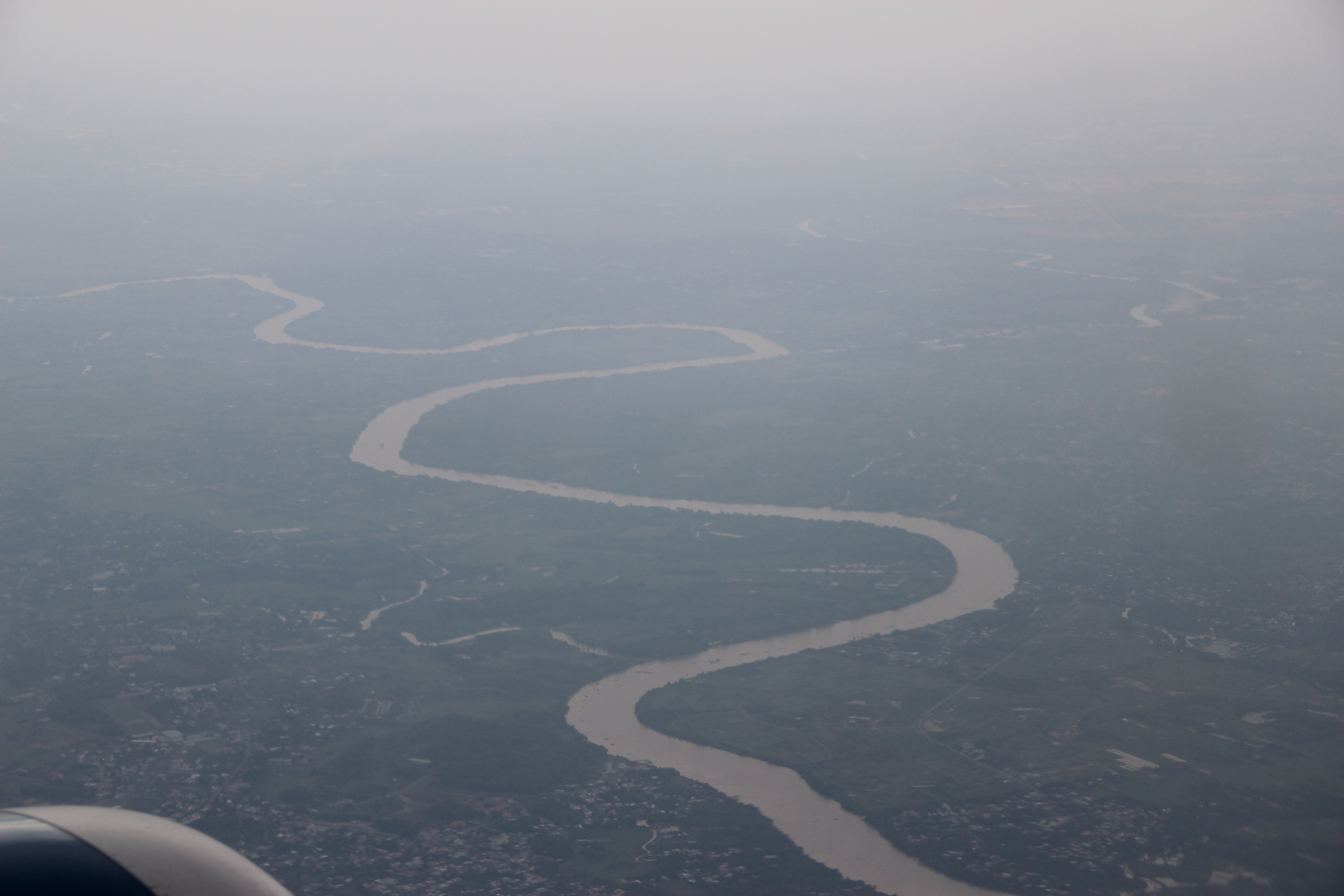
View of the river at the border of Thủ Dầu Một and Củ Chi district

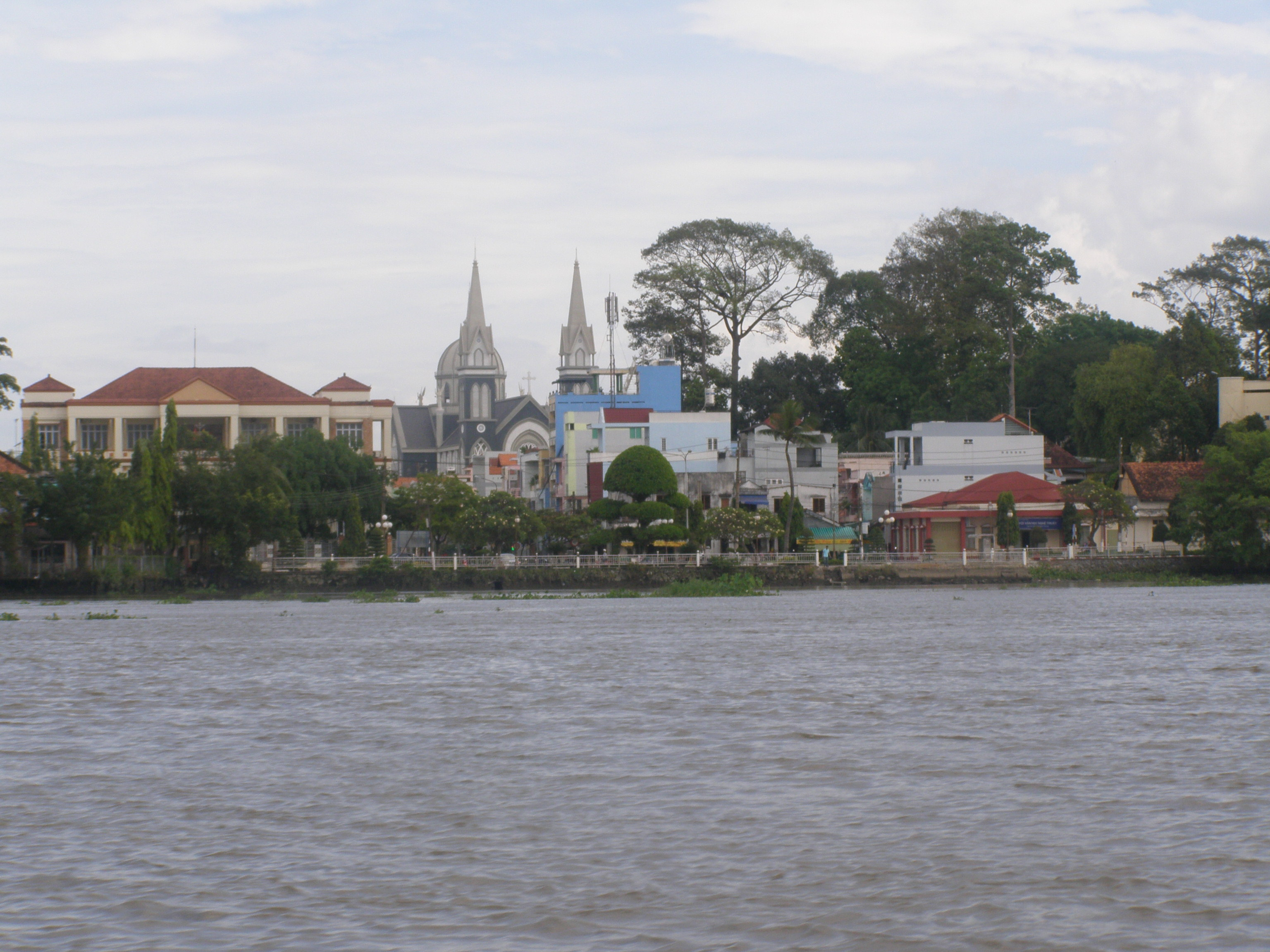
Downtown Thủ Dầu Một seen from the river

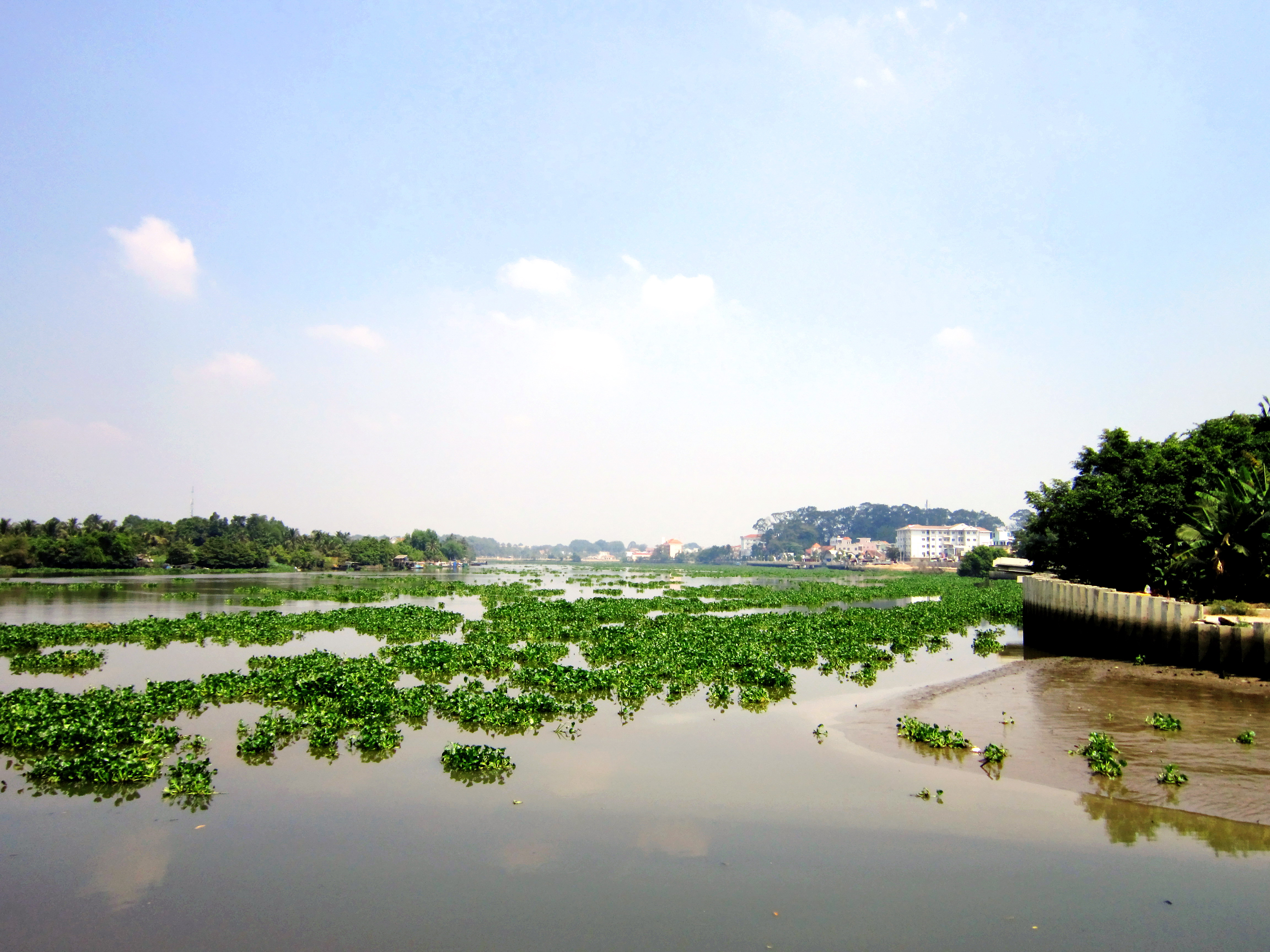
The river in Thủ Dầu Một

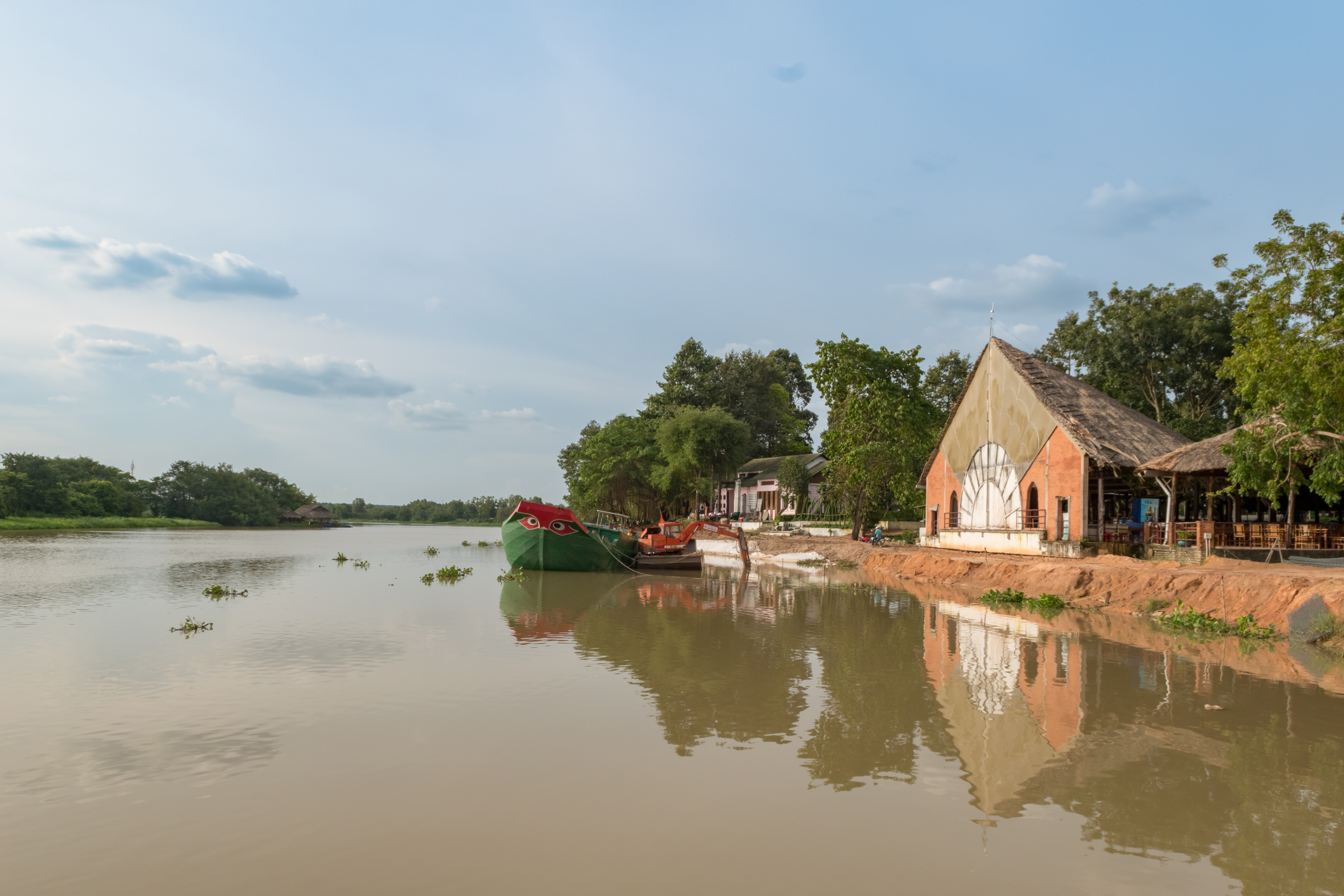
The river in Củ Chi district, next to the site of the Bến Dược Memorial Temple

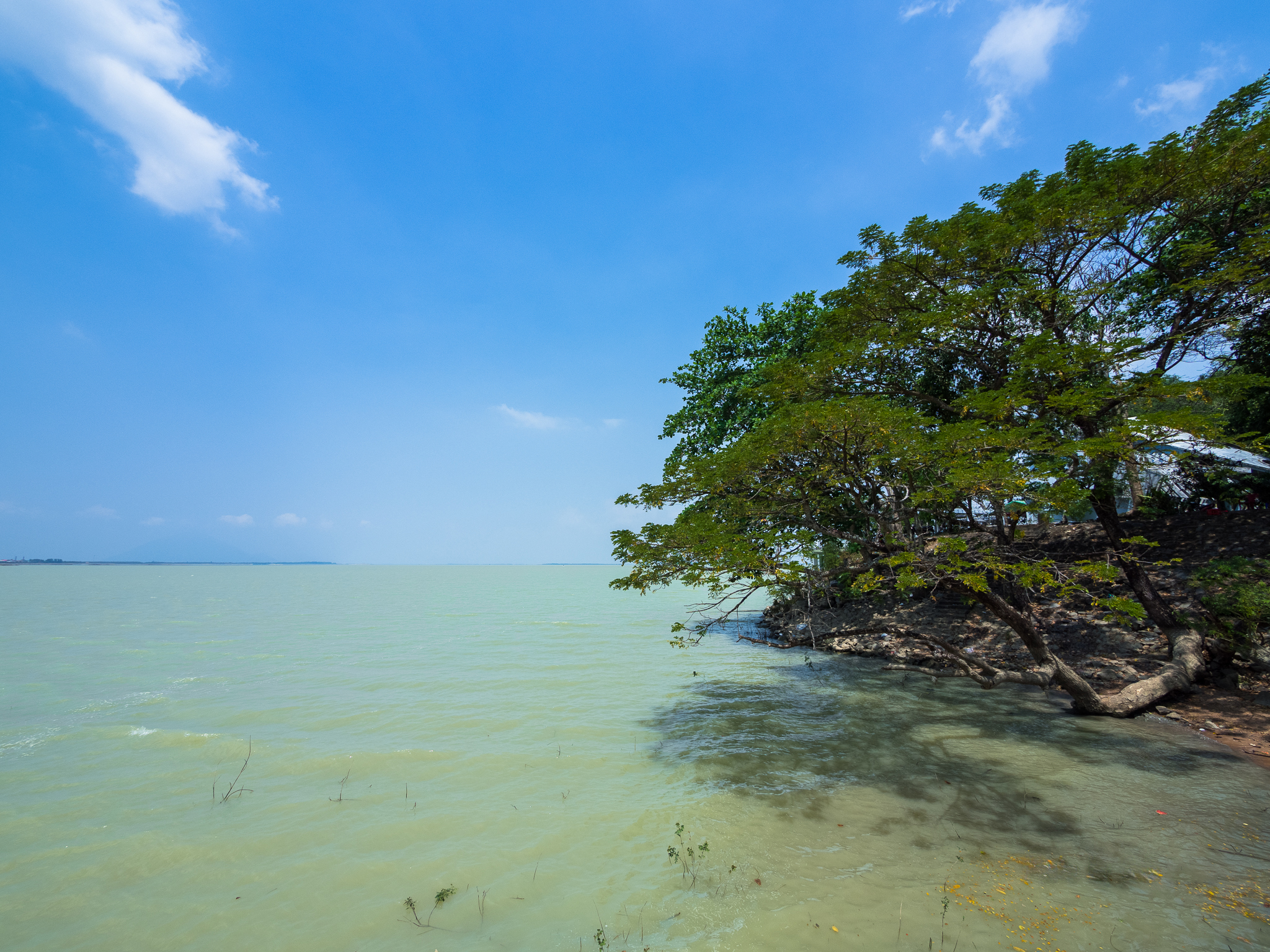
View of the Dầu Tiếng Reservoir

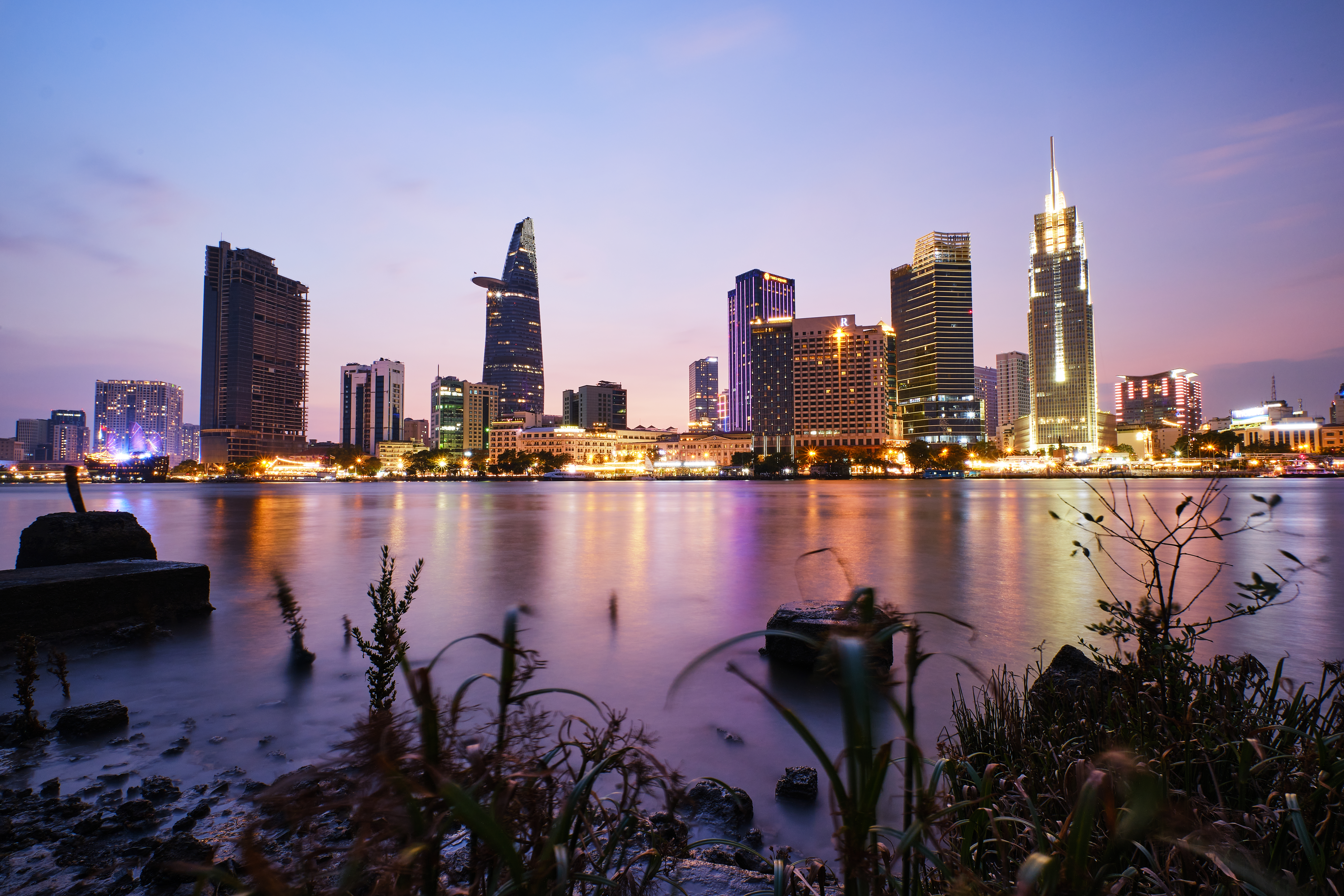
Bạch Đằng Quay on Saigon River viewed from Saigon River Park, Thủ Thiêm

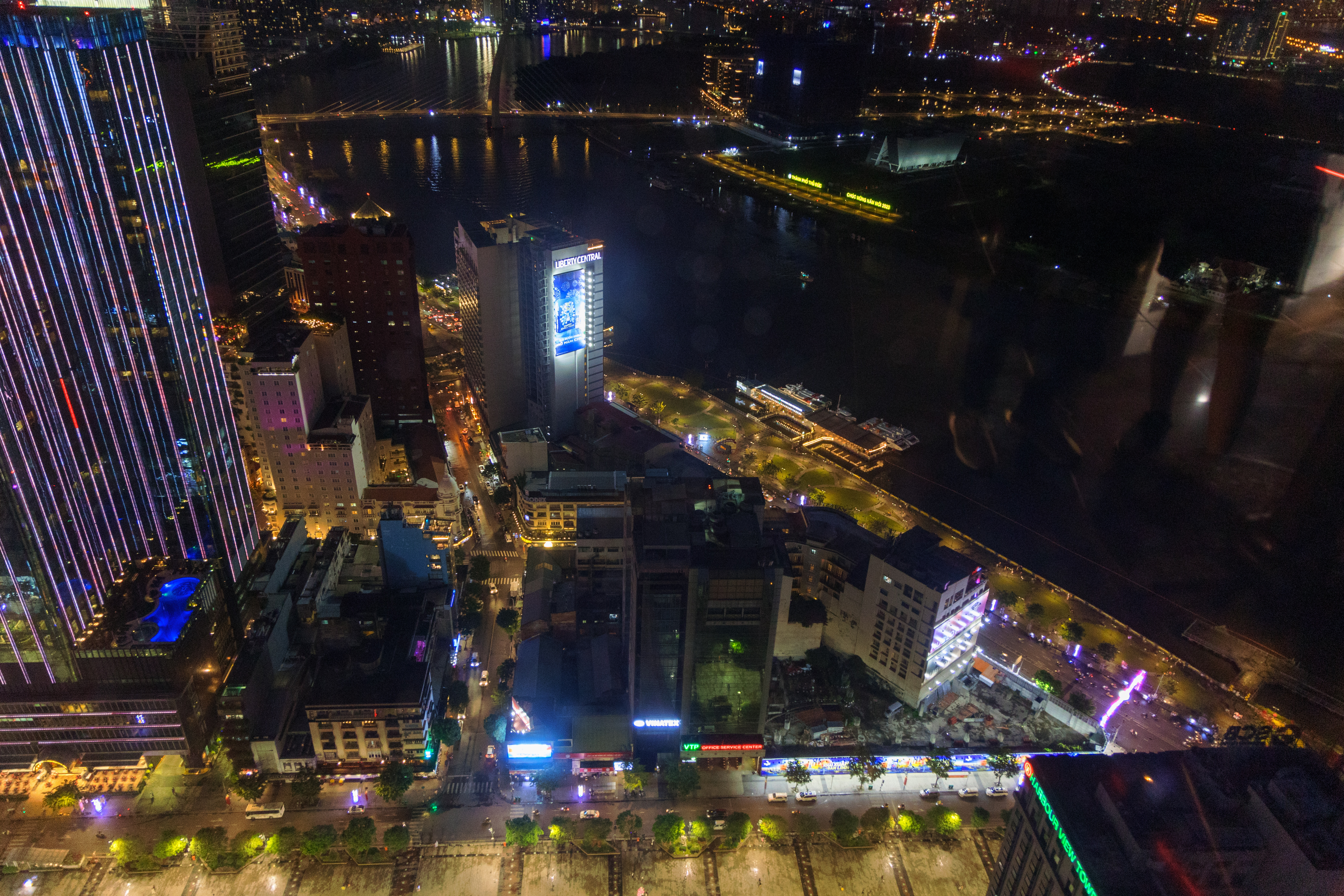
At night in downtown Ho Chi Minh City (2023)

== See also ==
- Bé River
- Đồng Nai River
- Dầu Tiếng Reservoir
- Nhà Bè River
