= Hàm Thuận Bắc district =

Coordinates: 11.167°N 108.083°E

Hàm Thuận Bắc District Huyện Hàm Thuận Bắc
- District
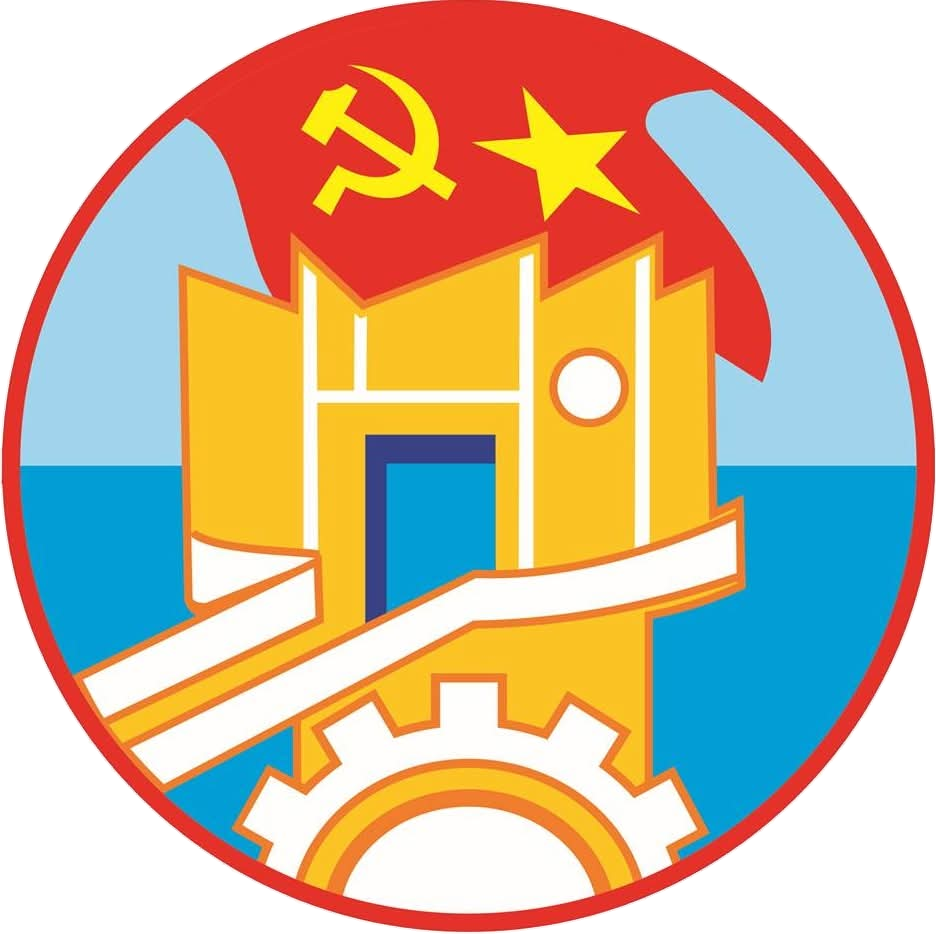
- Seal
- Interactive map of Hàm Thuận Bắc District
- Country: Vietnam
- Region: Southeast
- Province: Bình Thuận
- Capital: Ma Lâm

Area
  - Total: 493 sq mi (1,277 km^{2})

Population (2003)
  - Total: 156,535
- Time zone: UTC+07:00 (Indochina Time)

Hàm Thuận Bắc is a former rural district of Bình Thuận province in the Southeast region of Vietnam. In 2003 the district had a population of 156,535. The district covers an area of 1,277 square kilometres (493 square miles). The district capital lies at Ma Lâm.

It is the site of the Hàm Thuận – Đa Mi hydroelectric power stations.

== Communes ==
The district has two town-level (thị trấn) administrative units, Ma Lâm (population 13,391) and Phú Long (population 14,042), and 15 rural communes (xã): Đa Mi where the first dam is located, Đông Tiến, La Dạ, Đông Giang, Thuận Hòa, Hàm Phú, Thuận Minh, Hàm Liêm, Hàm Hiệp, Hàm Chính, Hàm Trí, Hồng Liêm, Hồng Sơn, Hàm Thắng and Hàm Đức.

== History ==
Finds belonging to the Sa Huỳnh culture have been found in the district. Hàm Thuận was established as an administrative area (phủ) in 1832 in the reign of Minh Mạng, and separated into North and South districts in 1983.
