= Trị An =

- Ward
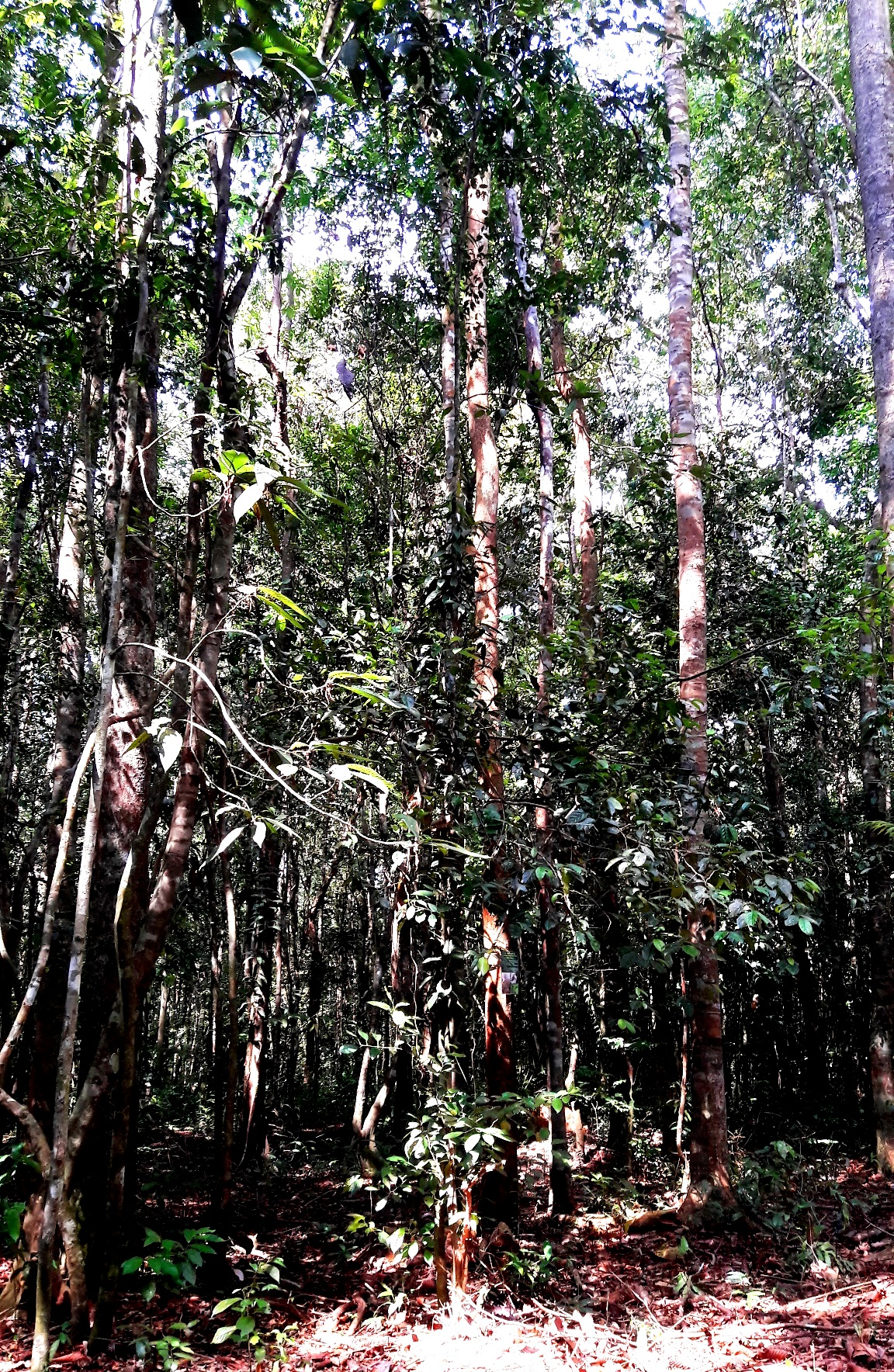
- Mã Đà Forest in the area of Zone D

- Location within Vietnam
- Coordinates: 11.089410030849143°N 107.03565579821311°E
- Country: Vietnam
- Region: Southeast Vietnam
- City: Đồng Nai
- Established: 30 April 2026
- Administrative headquarters: Trị An Quarter

Area
  - Total: 660.5 km^{2} (255.0 sq mi)

Population (31 December 2025)
  - Total: 51,832
  - Density: 78/km^{2} (200/sq mi)
- Website: trian.dongnai.gov.vn

Trị An is a ward (phường) of Đồng Nai, in Southeast Vietnam.

Trị An ward was reformed from the same name commune (xã) of Đồng Nai province in 2026, which was formed from the former Vĩnh An Town with communes of Mã Đà and Trị An, Vĩnh Cửu district, Đồng Nai province in 2025 before. The ward is mostly known for the Trị An Reservoir with Mã Đà Forest.
