= Sông Bé Bridge =

Coordinates: 11°15′11″N 106°45′35″E

The Sông Bé Bridge (Vietnamese: Cầu Sông Bé) is a former road bridge spanning the Bé River in Bình Dương province, Southern Vietnam.

== History ==
The bridge was built in 1925–1926 during the French colonial era during the expansion of rubber plantations in the area. It was established at the same time as Phuoc Hoa Rubber Company. The old Sông Bé Bridge was destroyed by the American military in 1969. In 1967, the US Air Force dropped 750- and 3000-pound bombs that impacted on the center and northeast sections of the bridge.

A newer bridge was rebuilt over the river and named the Phuoc Hoa Bridge. However, the old bridge is retained as a reminder of the "harrowing and heroic feats" involving "French colonialism and American imperialism".

== Technical Details ==
According to the provincial relic management board, the destroyed bridge has a width over 4.5m, the length of each remaining side is about 50m long (including three steel beam) with two concrete pillars measuring to the highest point and 3.5 m to the lowest point. The bridge is 30m high overall.
