= La Dạ =

Coordinates: 11°18′12″N 107°52′37″E

- Interactive map of La Dạ
- Country: Vietnam
- Province: Lâm Đồng

La Dạ is a rural commune in Lâm Đồng Province, Vietnam. The area is 145,38 km², and in 2001 the population was 2,774. It is mainly notable as the site of the first of the dams and hydroelectric power stations of the Hàm Thuận - Đa Mi Hydroelectric Power Complex.
