= Đa Nhim River =

River in Vietnam

Coordinates: 11°42′N 108°15′E

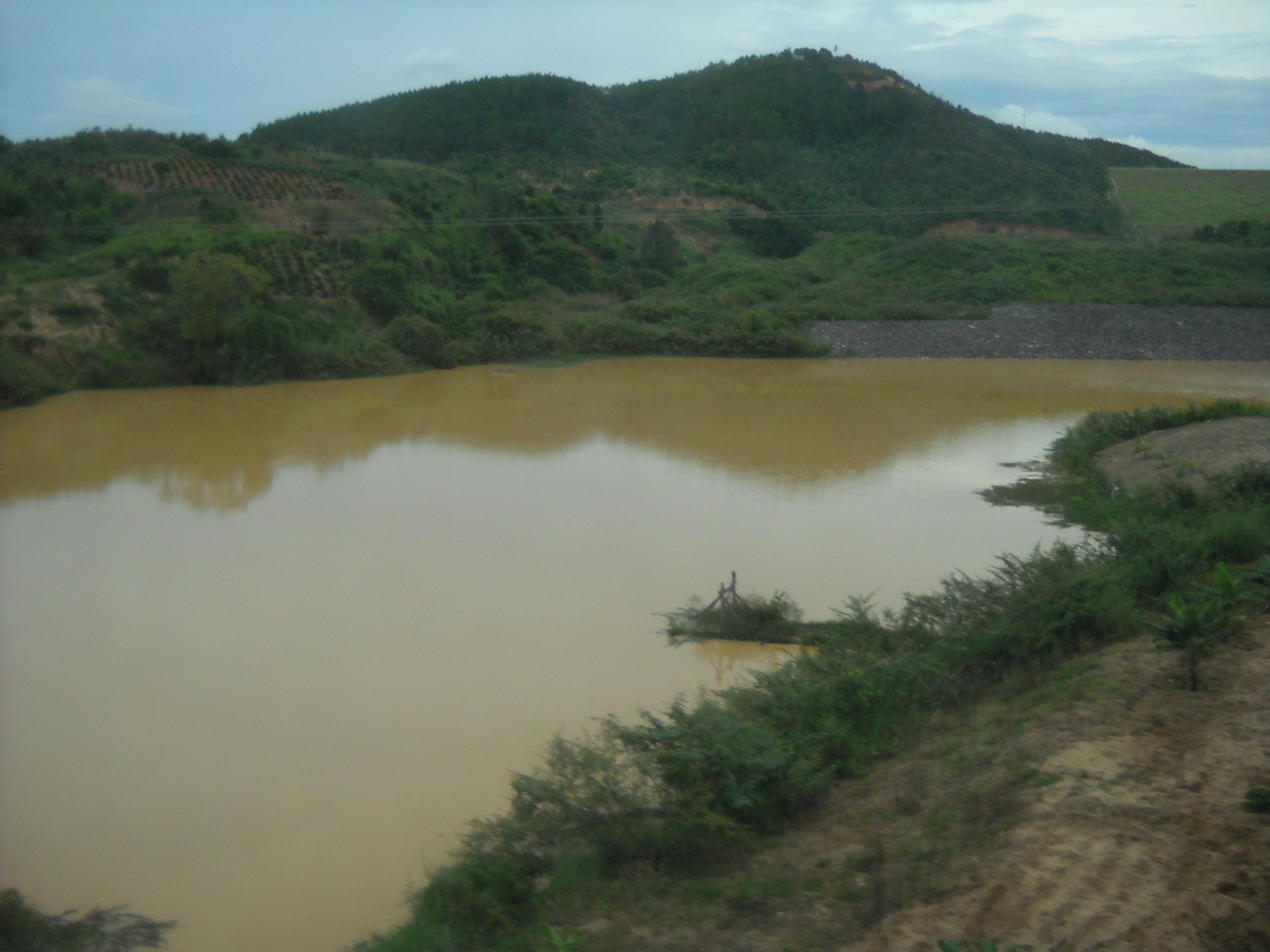

Đa Nhim River (Rhade language: Daàm Bri / "the stream from the forest") is a tributary of the Đa Dâng River (Đồng Nai River) in Lâm Đồng province, Vietnam.

== History ==
The Đa Nhim Hydroelectric Power Plant was built on the river during the 1960s to supply electricity to Saigon.
