= Đồng Nai River =

River in southern Vietnam

Coordinates: 10.9303°N 106.824°E

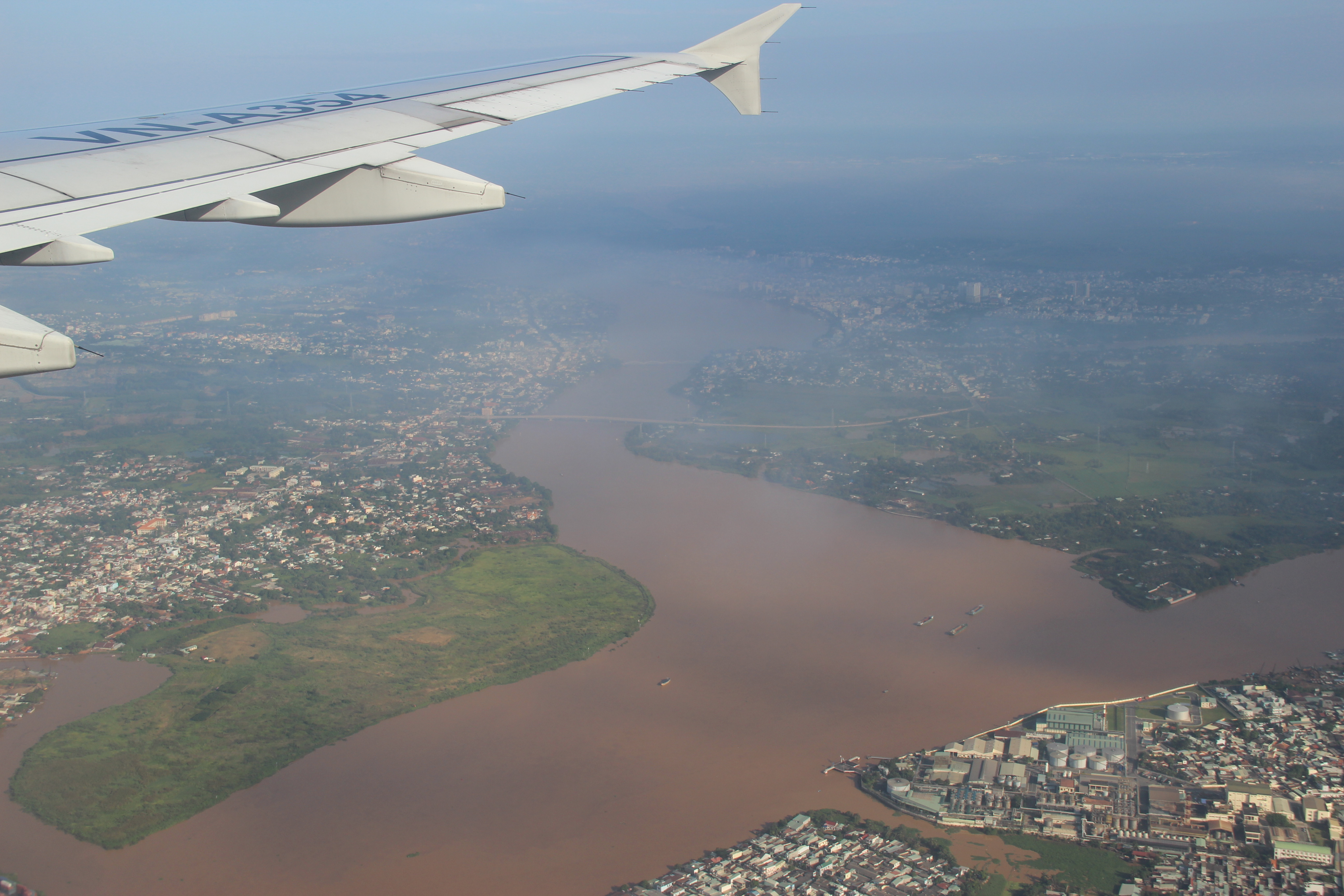
- Đồng Nai River at Thủ Đức, Dĩ An (west bank) and Biên Hòa (east bank)

- Location within Vietnam Location within Southeast Asia Location within Asia
- Native name: Sông Đồng Nai (Vietnamese)

Physical characteristics
- Mouth: South China Sea
  - location: Cần Giờ Mangrove Forest
  - elevation: 0 m (0 ft)
- Length: 568 km (353 mi)
- Basin size: 38.600 km
- Width
  - maximum: 2.6 km

Basin features
- Tributaries
  - left: Đa Nhim River, La Ngà River
  - right: Bé River, Saigon River, Vàm Cỏ River
- Waterbodies: Trị An Reservoir
- Bridges: Đồng Nai Bridge
- Inland ports: Saigon Port

The Đồng Nai River (Vietnamese: sông Đồng Nai) is a river in Vietnam that originates in the Central Highlands region of the southern portion of the country. It is approximately 586 km in length, making it the longest river to be entirely located in Vietnam. It gives its name to Đồng Nai Municipality.

== Geography ==
The Dong Nai River flows through the provinces of Lam Dong, Dak Nong, Binh Phuoc, Dong Nai, Binh Duong and Ho Chi Minh City with a length of over 586 km and a basin of 38,600 km^{2}, if calculated from the source of the Đa Dâng River, it is 586 km long. From the confluence with the Đa Nhim River below the Pongour waterfall, it measures 487 km. The Dong Nai River flows into the East Sea in Cần Giờ District.

The main stream of upper Dong Nai river is also known as the Đa Đang river: the name used by the minority Maa and Koho people. The river originates from Lam Vien plateau, meandering along the northeast-southwest direction from the mountains to the plateau in Ta Lai (Tan Phu district, Dong Nai province). The river forms the natural boundary between Đăk R'Lấp District (Dak Nong) and Bảo Lâm District, Lâm Đồng Province, Cát Tiên District, between Cát Tiên and Bù Đăng District, Tan Phu District, Dong Nai and between Tan Phu and Đạ Tẻh District.

After meeting the Bé River, the Dong Nai River forms a natural boundary between Dong Nai on the east and Bình Dương Province on the west bank.

Between the confluence with the Saigon River and where it splits into the Soài Rạp and Lòng Tàu distributaries, the river is commonly known as the Nhà Bè river.

The river flows through Bien Hoa City, then flows along the boundary between Dong Nai and Ho Chi Minh City, between Ba Ria - Vung Tau and Ho Chi Minh City.

== Hydropower ==
Major hydropower dams in the Dong Nai river basin:

- On the main Dong Nai river: Trị An Dam, Dong Nai 2, Dong Nai 3, Dong Nai 4, Dong Nai 5, Dong Nai 6 (in development) and Dong Nai 6A (in development). The Dong Nai 6 and 6A projects are controversial as they are likely to have a significant impact on the biodiversity of Cat Tien National Park.
- Bé River: Thac Mo dam, Cần Đơn dam
- Saigon River: Dau Tieng Lake
- Da Nhim River: Da Nhim (or Dai Ninh) dam
- La Nga River: Hàm Thuận – Đa Mi hydroelectric power stations

== Gallery ==
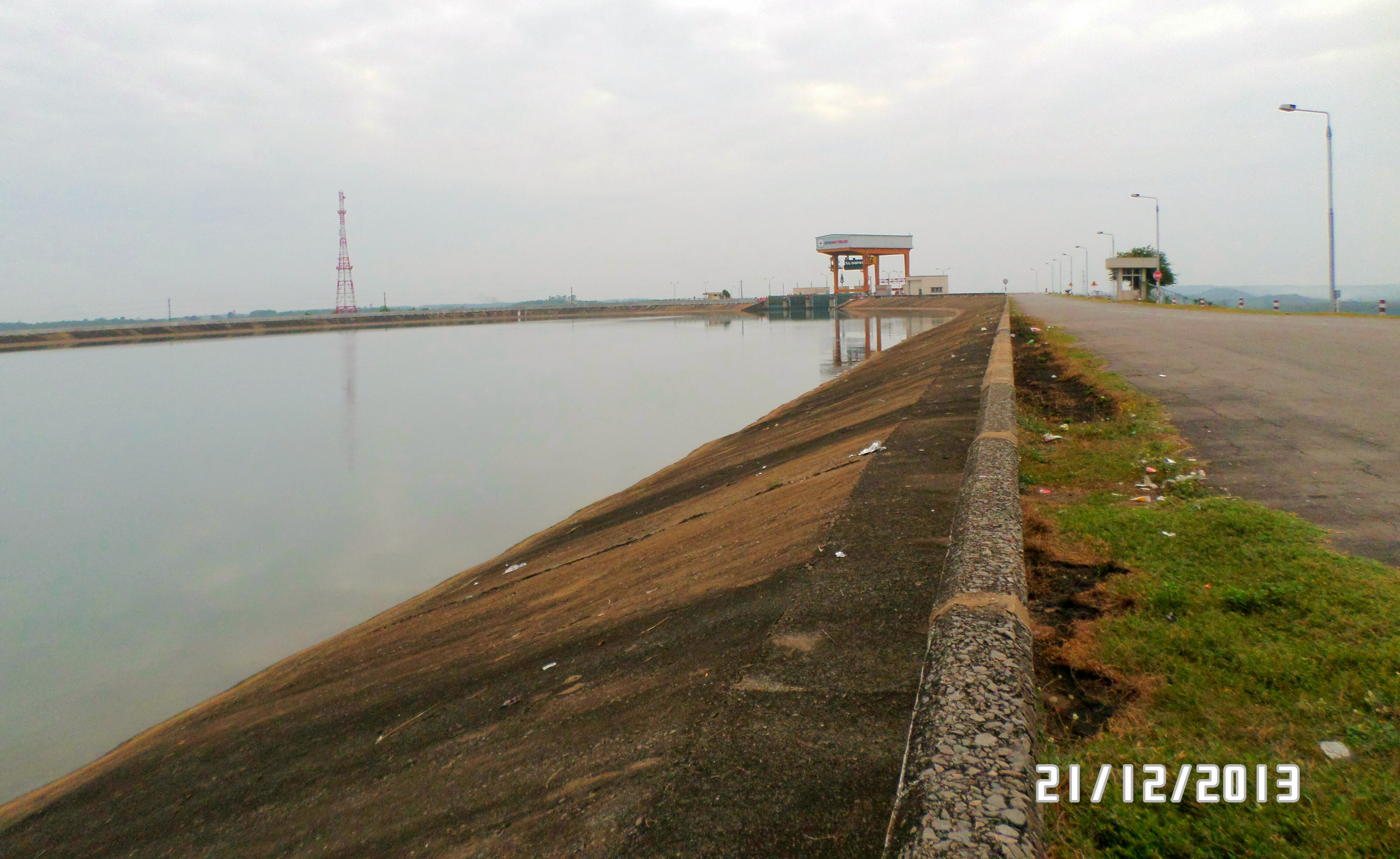
Trị An Dam

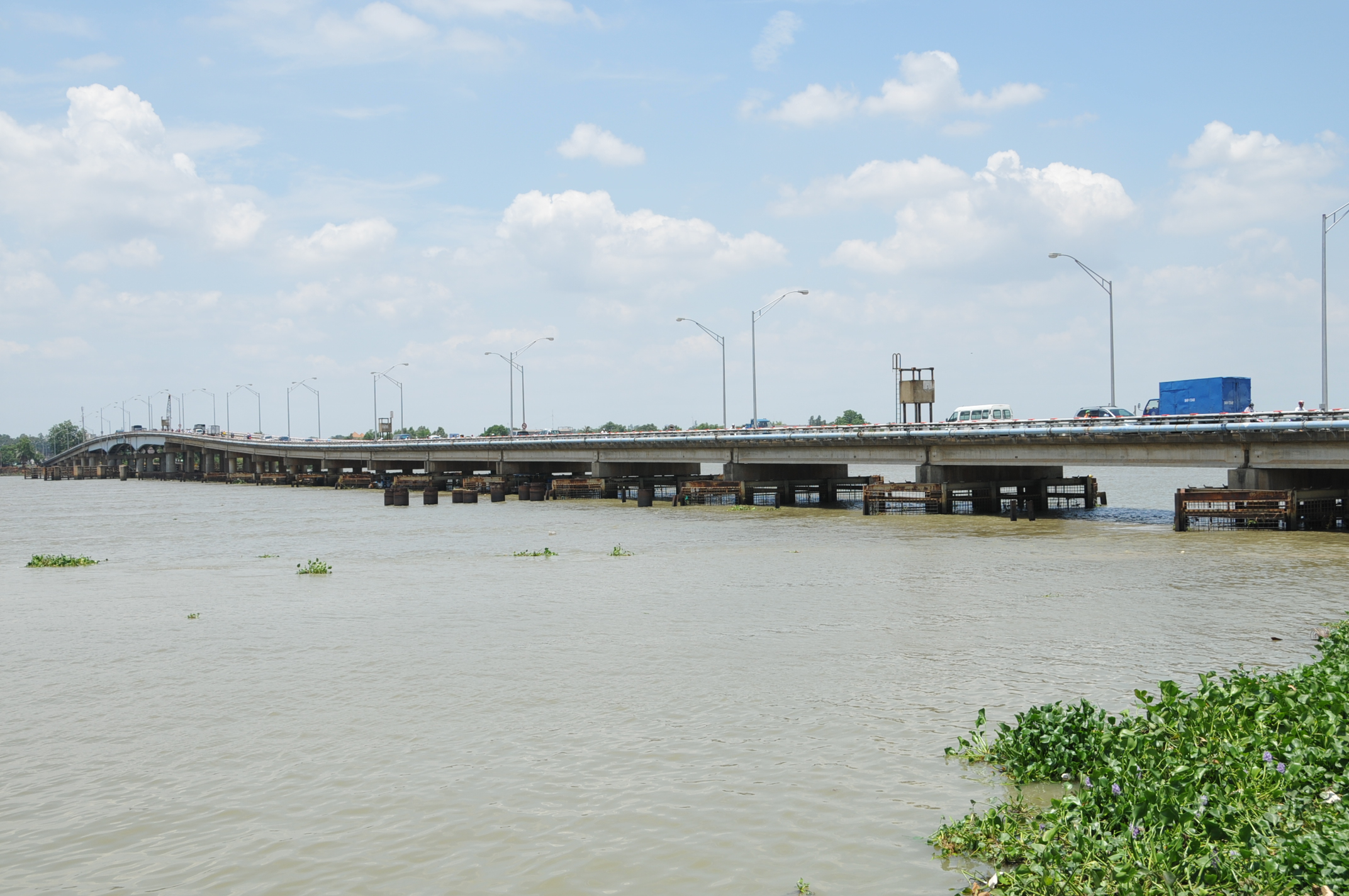
Near Bien Hoa

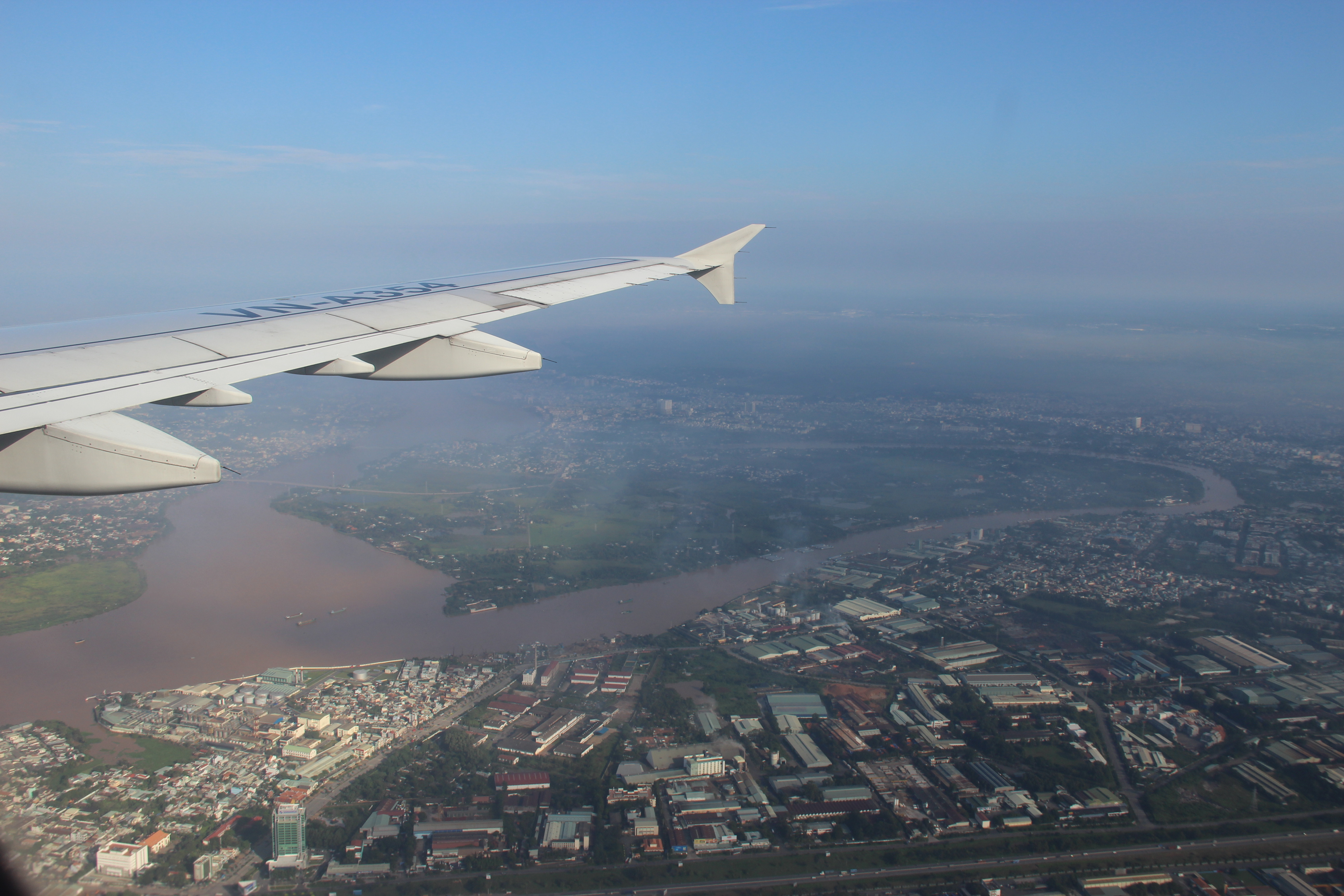
Aerial view of the river in Biên Hòa
