= Trị An Reservoir =

- Trị An Lake
- Hồ Trị An (Vietnamese)
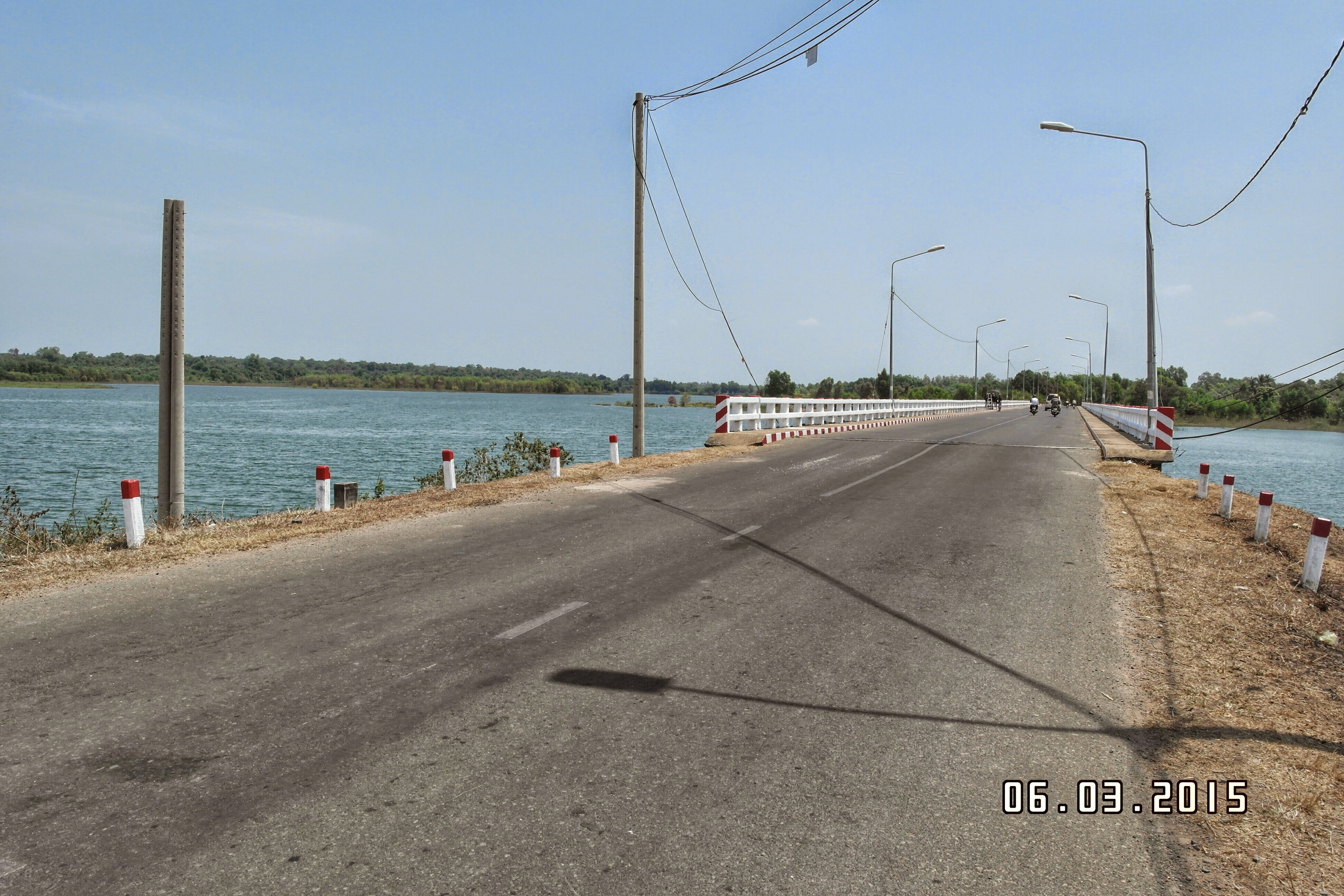
- A bridge across the reservoir in Vĩnh Cửu district

- Location within Vietnam
- Location: Đồng Nai province
- Coordinates: 11°11′09″N 107°09′04″E
- Type: Reservoir
- River sources: Đồng Nai River, La Ngà River
- Basin countries: Vietnam
- Built: 1984
- First flooded: 1987
- Surface area: 323 square kilometres (125 sq mi)
- Water volume: ~ 2.8 billion cubic metres (99×10^{9} cu ft)

Trị An Reservoir, also known as Trị An Lake (Vietnamese: Hồ Trị An), is an artificial lake situated on the Dong Nai River. It encompasses areas within the Vĩnh Cửu, Định Quán, Thống Nhất and Trảng Bom districts of Đồng Nai province. The reservoir stores water and supplies it to Trị An Dam.

The reservoir spans an area of 323 square kilometers (80,000 acres) and has a capacity of 2.7 billion cubic metres (95×10^{9} ft^{3}). Cát Tiên National Park is located in the northern part of the lake. The lake contains 76 small islands, some of which are inhabited. Today, it is also a popular picnic spot in Đồng Nai Province.
