= Hàm Thuận Bắc =

- Commune
- Interactive map of Hàm Thuận Bắc
- Coordinates: 11.108349143984956°N 108.13245867255081°E
- Country: Vietnam
- Region: South Central Coast and Central Highlands
- Province: Lâm Đồng
- Established: 1 July 2025
- Administrative headquarters: Km 20, National Route 28, Phú Hòa Hamlet

Area
  - Total: 292.9 km^{2} (113.1 sq mi)

Population (1 July 2026)
  - Total: 29,995
  - Density: 102/km^{2} (260/sq mi)
- Website: hamthuanbac.lamdong.gov.vn

Hàm Thuận Bắc is a commune in Lâm Đồng province, Vietnam.

On 16 June 2025, the Standing Committee of the National Assembly of Vietnam issued Resolution No. 1671/NQ-UBTVQH15 on the arrangement of commune-level administrative units in Lâm Đồng province in 2025. Under the resolution, the entire area and population of Thuận Hòa, Hàm Trí, and Hàm Phú communes, formerly part of Hàm Thuận Bắc district, Bình Thuận province, were merged to form a new commune named Hàm Thuận Bắc.
