= Trị An Dam =

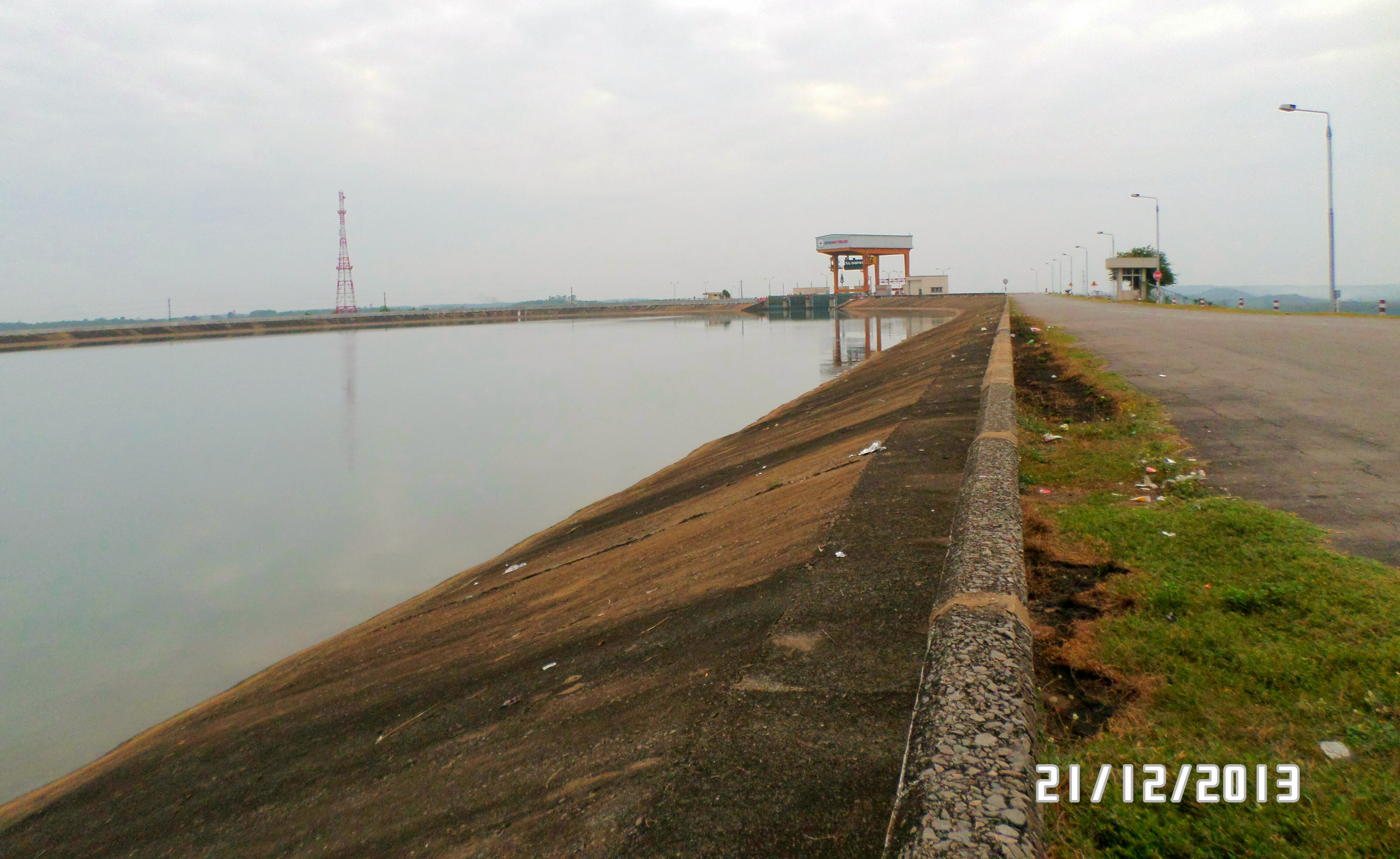

- Location within Vietnam
- Country: Vietnam
- Location: Trị An village, Vĩnh Cửu Đồng Nai Province
- Coordinates: 11°6′19″N 106°59′2″E
- Purpose: Hydroelectric
- Status: Operational
- Construction began: 1984
- Opening date: 1986
- Owner: EVN

Dam and spillways
- Impounds: Đồng Nai River

Reservoir
- Creates: Trị An Reservoir

Power Station
- Operator: Trị An Hydropower Company
- Commission date: 1988
- Installed capacity: 400 MW
- Annual generation: 1.76 TWh

Trị An is a hydroelectric dam and lake on the Đồng Nai River in Vĩnh Cửu, Đồng Nai, Vietnam. The power plant has an installed electric capacity of 400 MW and produces around 1.76 TWh of electricity per year. The plant is operated by Trị An Hydropower Company, a subsidiary of Vietnam Electricity.

The dam was built in 1984–1986 with the assistance of the Soviet Union. The power plant became operational in 1988. The dam forms a man-made reservoir lake known as Trị An Lake. La Ngà village on the La Ngà River was created as a result of population displacement.

The dam appears on the 5000 Vietnamese đồng note released in 1993.
