= Đa Nhim Hydroelectric Power Station =

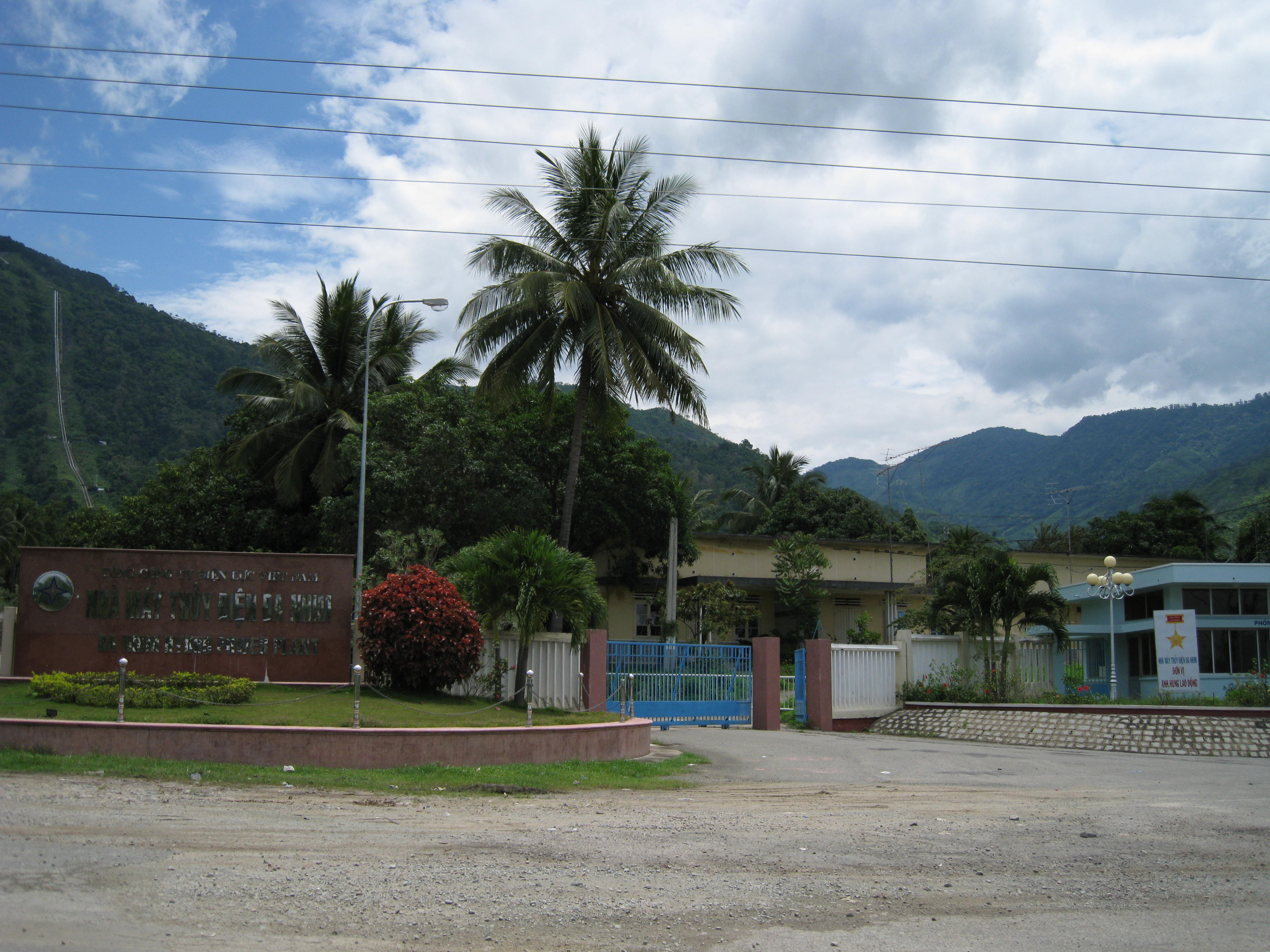
- The power station at Đa Nhim

- Location within Vietnam
- Coordinates: 11°51′11″N 108°36′21″E
- Construction began: April 1961
- Opening date: January 1964
- Owner: EVN

Power Station
- Operator: Da Nhim – Ham Thuan – Da Mi Hydropower Joint Stock Co.
- Turbines: 4 X 40 MW Pelton turbines (Toshiba replaced by GE in 2013)
- Installed capacity: 160 MW

The Đa Nhim Hydroelectric Power Station is a power station on the Đa Nhim River in Vietnam. Phase 1 construction started in April 1961 and was finished in January 1964. It has installed capacity of 160 MW. Đa Nhim Lake is at an altitude of 1,042 metres (3,419 ft).

It was the first hydroelectric power station in South Vietnam. Electricity produced here supplied the central region of Vietnam but was unable to reach the large industrial centres in Saigon and Biên Hòa, which had to rely on oil for electricity generation. Two large pipes, crossing the road, carrying water from a height of 1,000 metres to Đa Nhim lake, drive the turbines of the hydropower plant.

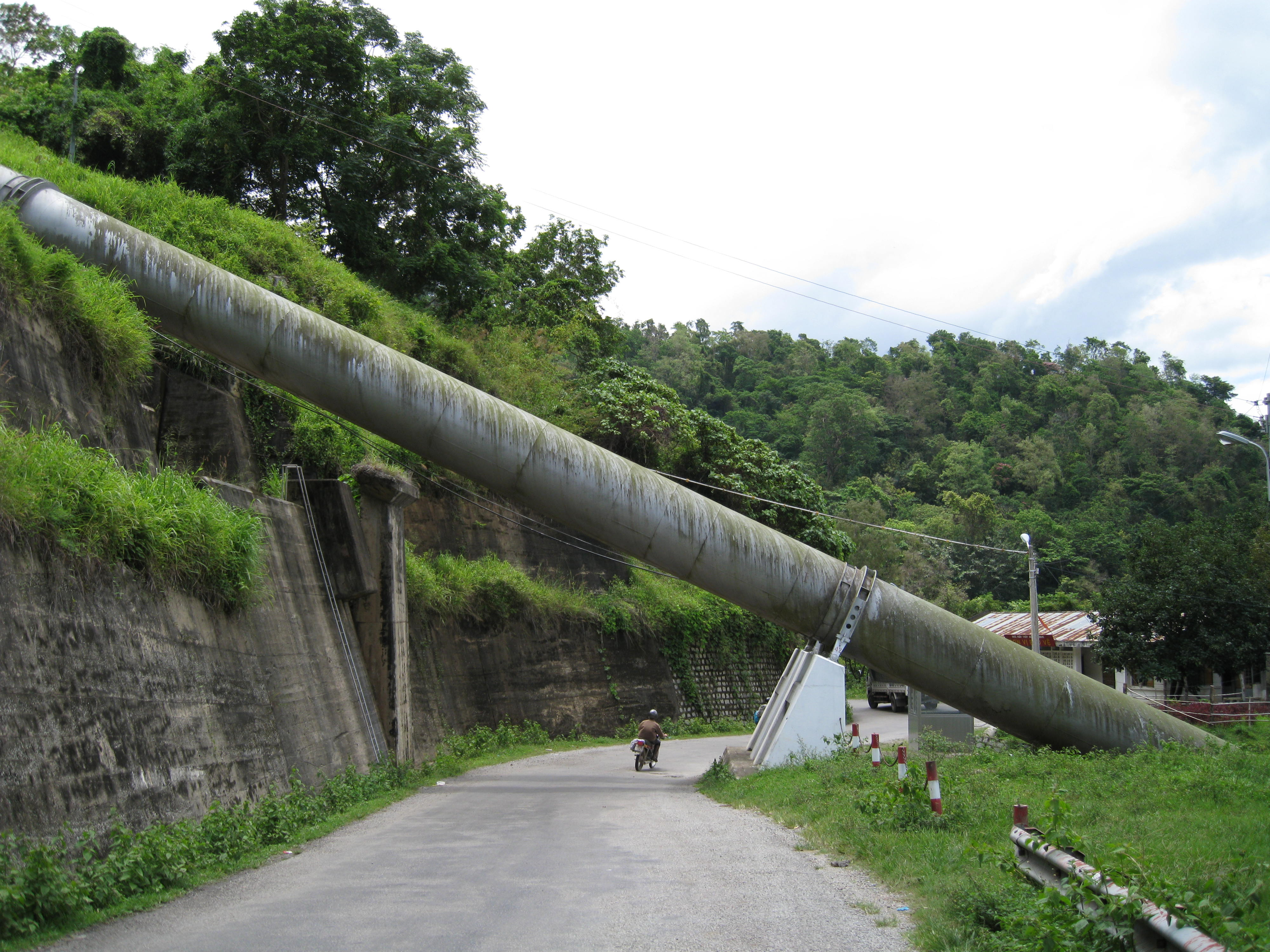
Water down pipe

The Da Nhim Hydropower Plant Expansion Project installed an additional 80 MW turbine, increasing the total installed capacity to 240 MW. The project commenced in December 2015, and successfully connected to the grid in December 2018, with an estimated annual output of 99 million kWh.
