= Hàm Thuận =

Hàm Thuận Xã Hàm Thuận
- Commune
- Hàm Thuận commune
- Location within Vietnam
- Coordinates: 11°04′06″N 108°07′48″E
- Country: Vietnam
- Region: South Central Coast
- Province: Lâm Đồng
- Time zone: UTC+7 (UTC + 7)

Hàm Thuận is a commune (xã) of Lâm Đồng Province, Vietnam.
