= Vĩnh Cửu district =

District in Southeast Vietnam

Coordinates: 11.333°N 107.083°E

Vĩnh Cửu district Huyện Vĩnh Cửu
- District
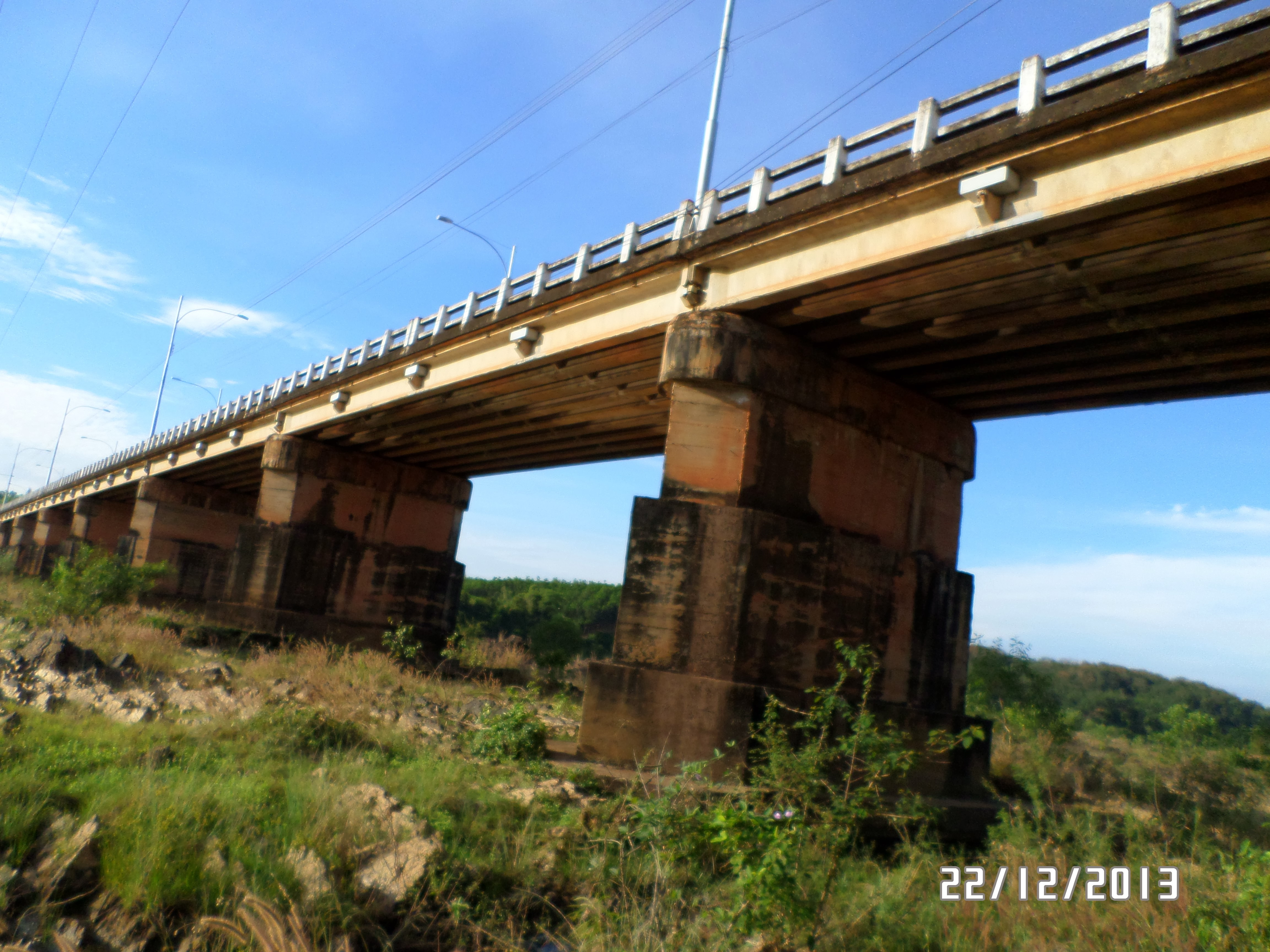
- Foot of Đồng Nai Bridge

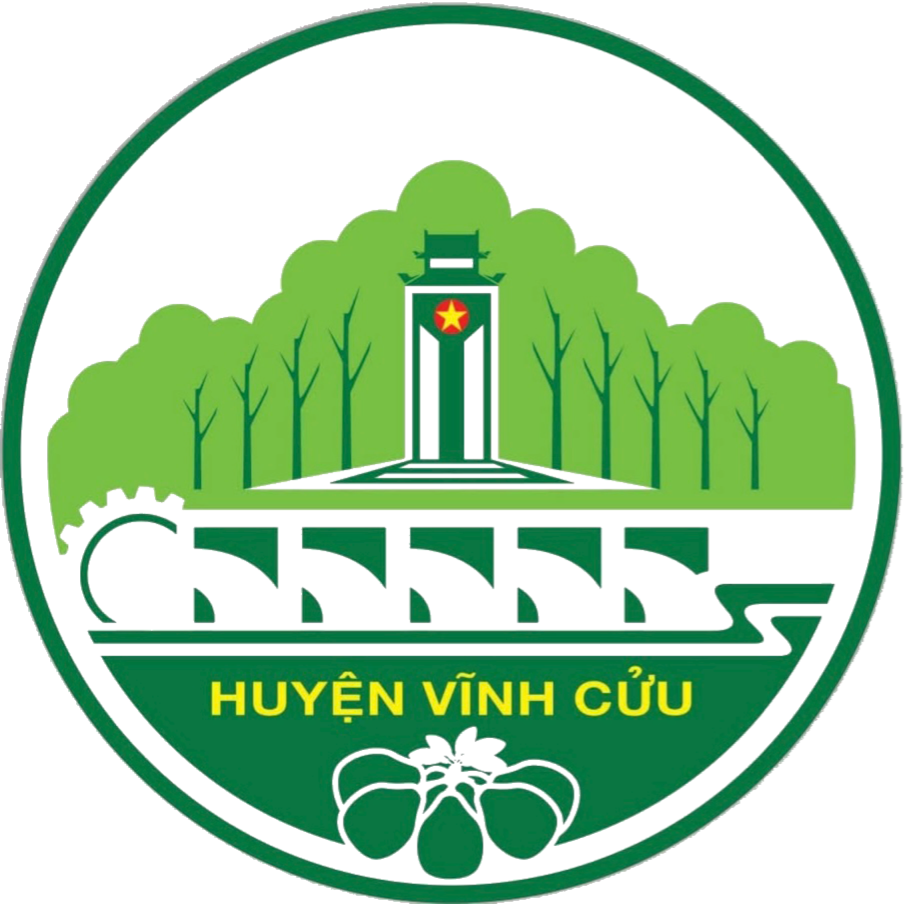
- Seal
- Interactive map of Vĩnh Cửu district
- Country: Vietnam
- Region: Southeast
- Province: Đồng Nai
- Capital: Vĩnh An

Area
  - Total: 433 sq mi (1,122 km^{2})

Population (2019)
  - Total: 367,377
- Time zone: UTC+7 (Indochina Time)

Vĩnh Cửu is a former rural district of Đồng Nai province in the Southeast region of Vietnam. As of 2003 the district had a population of 106,067. The district covers an area of 1,122 km^{2} (433 sq mi). The district capital lies at Vĩnh An.

The Vĩnh Cửu nature reserve is an area of (mostly secondary) seasonal tropical forest and links directly with Cát Tiên National Park; together they provide contiguous habitat for a number of endangered species including yellow-cheeked gibbons, gaur and Asian elephants. The Trị An lake (hồ) and dam form a substantial part of this district.

== Administrative subdivisions ==
The district is subdivide to a township and 11 rural communes, including:

- Vĩnh An township
- Bình Hòa commune
- Bình Lợi commune
- Hiếu Liêm commune
- Mã Đà commune
- Phú Lý commune
- Tân An commune
- Tân Bình commune
- Thạnh Phú commune
- Thiện Tân commune
- Trị An commune
- Vĩnh Tân commune
