= La Ngà River =

River in Vietnam

The La Ngà River (Vietnamese: Sông La Ngà) is a river of southern Vietnam. It originates in Lâm Đồng Province and flows through Bình Thuận Province and Đồng Nai Province for 272 kilometres (169 mi). The river has a catchment area of 4,710 km^{2} (1,820 sq mi). It is a major tributary of the Đồng Nai River, which it joins at Trị An Lake, and therefore part of one of the largest river systems in Vietnam. One of its tributaries in Bình Thuận Province supports a hydro-power plant: the Hàm Thuận – Đa Mi Hydroelectric Power Complex.

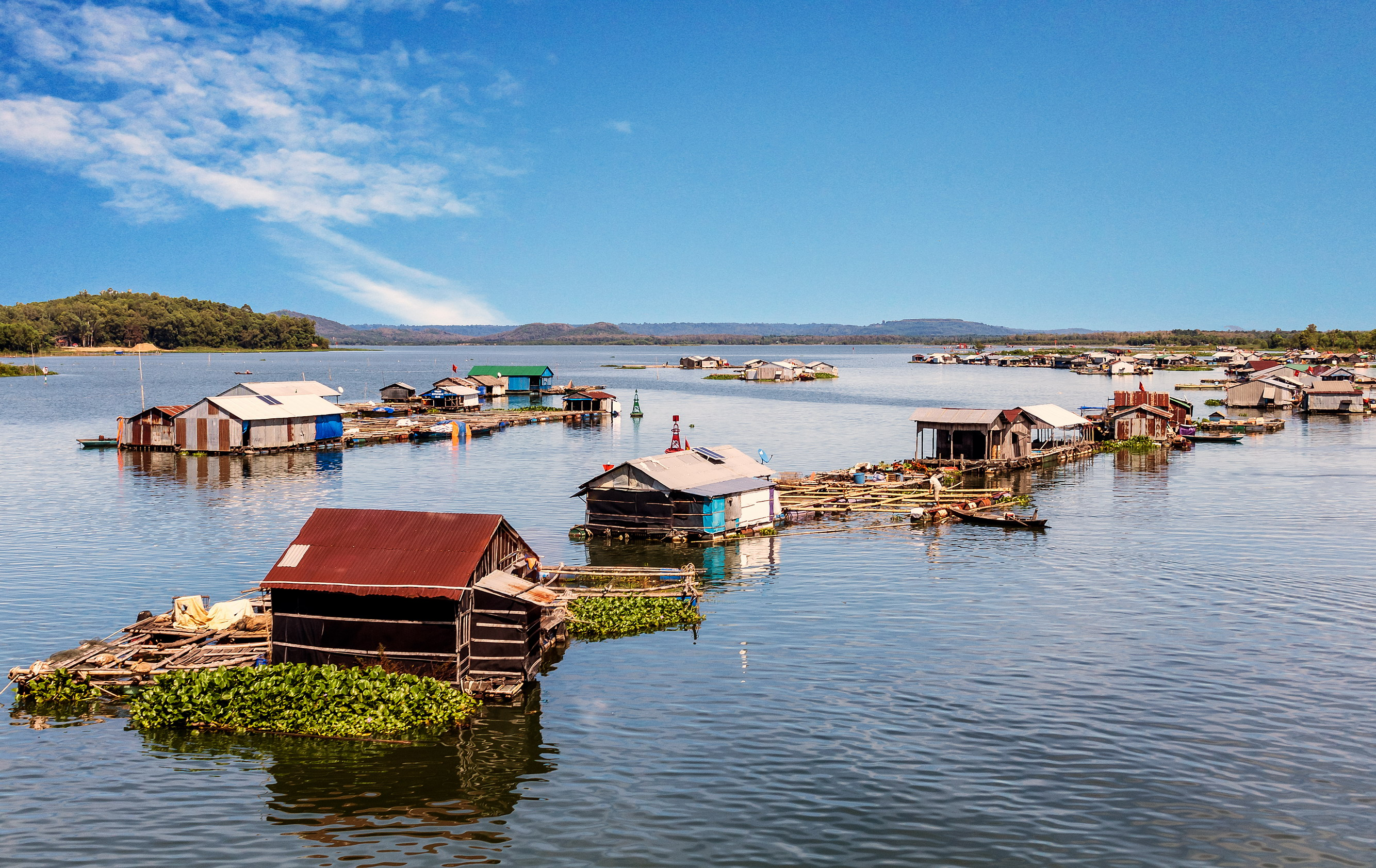
Floating dwellings on the Trị An Lake at the confluence with the Đồng Nai River
