= Bé River =

River in Vietnam

Coordinates: 11°7′24.1″N 106°57′24.2″E

The Bé River (Vietnamese: Sông Bé) is a river of southern Vietnam. It flows through Bình Phước Province, Bình Dương Province and Đồng Nai Province for approximately 350 kilometres. It starts from Thác Mơ lake in Phước Long town of Bình Phước Province and empties to Đồng Nai River near Trị An Dam.
