= Ted Nace =

American writer

- Born: California, United States
- Education: Phillips Academy
- Alma mater: Stanford University
- Occupations: Environmental activist Publisher; Author
- Years active: 20 years (activist); 10 years (publishing)
- Notable work: Climate Hope (book); Gangs of America

Ted Nace (born 1956) is an American writer, publisher, and environmentalist, known for his criticisms of corporate personhood and his support of a fossil fuel phase out. In 2009, he was described as "one of the amazing brains and strategists behind the anti-coal movement."

He is the co-founder of Peachpit Press and the founder of Global Energy Monitor.

== Early life ==
Ted Nace was born in California and grew up in Dickinson, North Dakota. In 1974, he graduated from Phillips Academy in Andover, Massachusetts. He received his B.A. from Stanford University, and attended graduate school at University of California Berkeley.

== Early career ==
In the 1970s, Nace worked for the Environmental Defense Fund and analyzed how to replace coal–fired power plants with alternative energy programs through computer simulations. He spent several years working in North Dakota at the Dakota Resource Council, a citizens' group concerned about the impacts of energy development on agriculture and rural communities.

=== Computer publishing ===
In the 1980s, Nace began working as an editor for the computer magazine PC World and as a columnist for Publish! and Computer Currents magazine.

In 1985, he founded Peachpit Press with Michael Gardner, initially working out of his apartment in the San Francisco Bay Area. He wrote numerous how–to books on computer–related subjects. At the time, Elaine Weinmann, the computer writer, described his publishing approach as user-friendly and innovative.

As the company grew in size and sales, it published books about Mac computers and became a leader in books about digital graphics, with a MacBible series, Real World series, and Visual QuickStart (VQS) series. Peachpit published most of the popular manuals of style by writer Robin Williams, such as The Mac is Not a Typewriter and the Little Mac Book.

In 1994, Nace sold Peachpit to Pearson plc and he left the company in 1996.

== Writing ==
In the 1980s, Nace began writing freelance essays, including regular contributions to Orion Magazine.

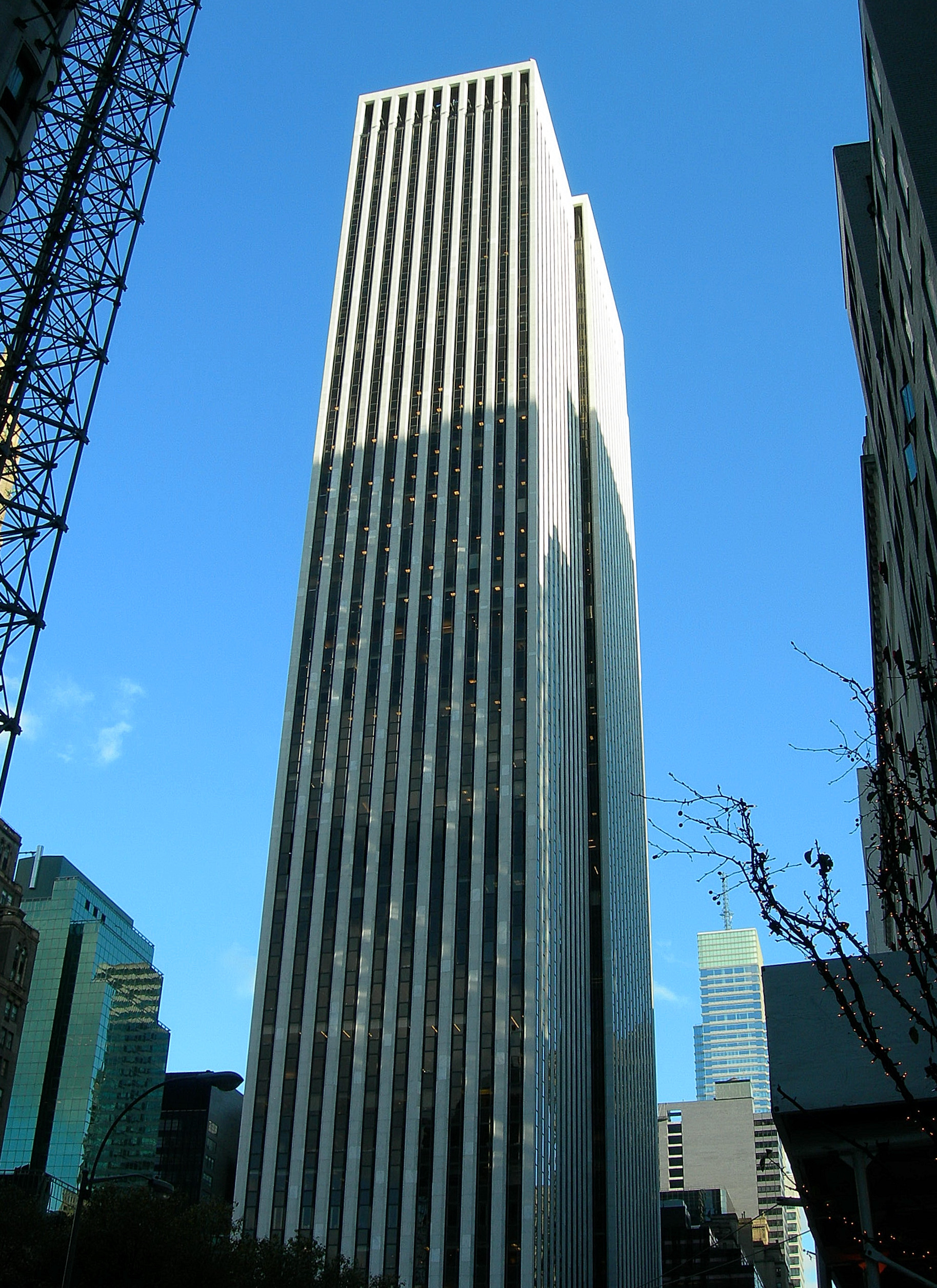
Nace has criticized corporations such as General Motors for having too much political influence. GM headquarters in New York City.

After he left Peachpit, his work increasingly focused on the relation between corporations and democracy in America. He reflected on his own career as a business owner:

Something complex and even alive has come into existence, but it is no longer governed by intuitively familiar human motives and values. Instead, it is a sophisticated, complex, adaptive, continually evolving system––a sort of mindless yet intelligent being––governed by an array of internal and external programming.

=== Gangs of America ===
His book Gangs of America: The Rise of Corporate Power and the Disabling of Democracy (2003) argued that corporations have deleterious effects on society and the economy. According to Nace, the specious character of corporation's quasi-legal enablements undermine American democracy. He used about his own experiences watching a coal mine develop in North Dakota to explain his concerns with corporate power:

Business does tend to get its way, acting by means of a nebulous force known as "corporate power" that drives much of what happens in both the public and private spheres ... But, of course, the entity planning the mine wasn't a someone but a something––a corporation. Although people in the company may well have cared, the corporation itself didn't. ... Nothing you may feel or do really matters, because in the end there is no getting around the fact that you are not fighting a normal opponent––your opponent is simply nobody.

Nace writes that as the corporate institution developed it got "too much power" in the United States. In an interview, he explained that the modern corporation was a structure that "gelled about a century ago", and that it is a "sort of life form" which has "persistence, metabolism, reproduction, adaptation". He has claimed that the 1886 Supreme Court decision of Santa Clara County v. Southern Pacific Railroad was an example of the "most well known" bad decisions that has granted corporations the same rights as people.

He has criticized the role that business plays in shaping political policy in the last few decades.

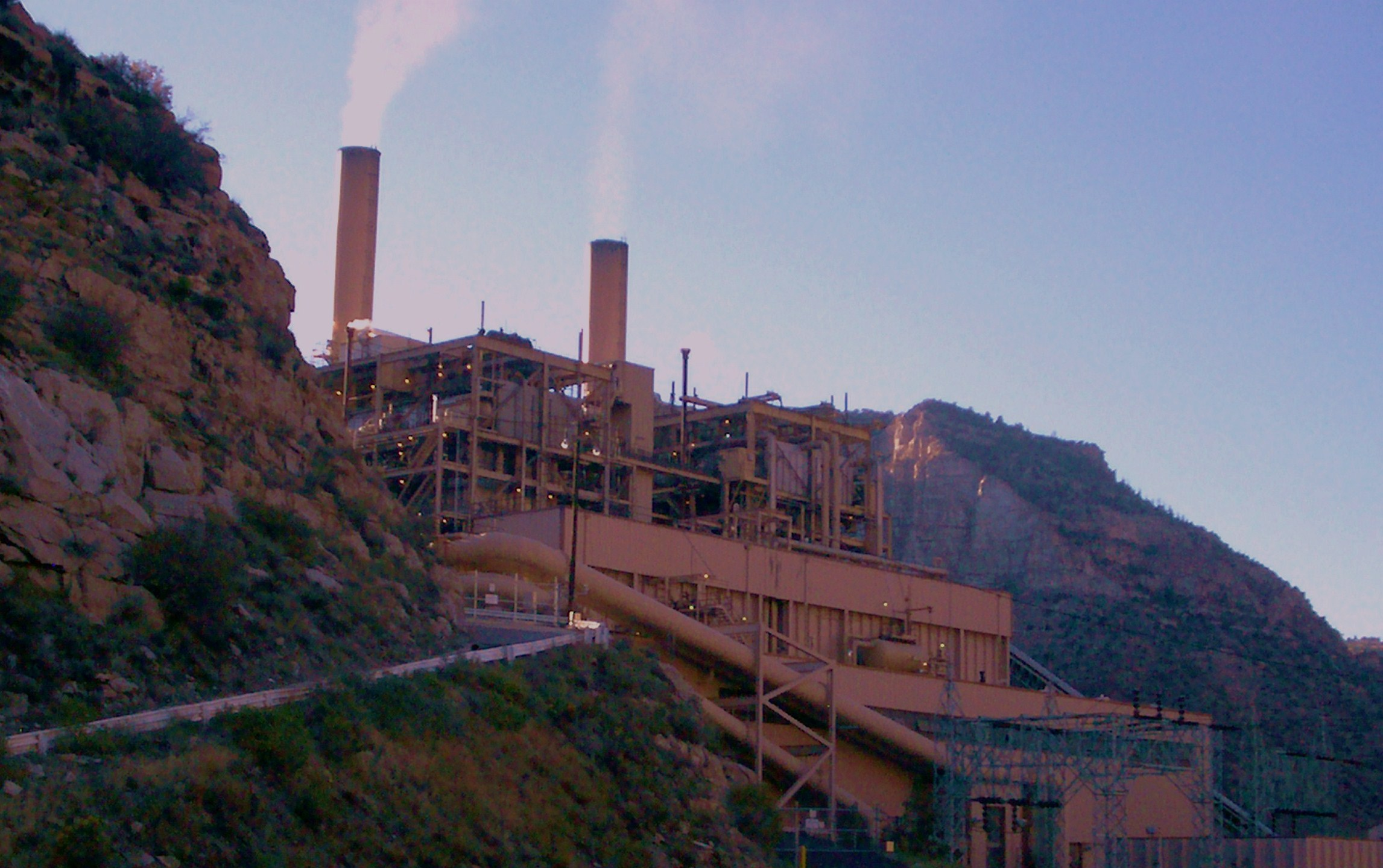
Castle Gate Power Plant in Utah.

A New York Times critic found Nace's Gangs of America to be well-researched and made a compelling case that corporations have too much political power, but the reviewer faulted Nace for ignoring the benefit to American shareholders and for slighting "the contributions the corporate form has made to average Americans' prosperity." Alan T. Saracevic, a reviewer at the San Francisco Chronicle, writes that Gangs of America makes a case that corporations have evolved to an "abusive state of being."

=== Climate Hope ===
Nace's second book, Climate Hope: On the Front Lines of the Fight Against Coal (2010) is a first-person chronicle of the anti–coal movement. Tina Gerhardt, the environmental journalist, lauded the book and described its climate agenda as "do-able".

== Environmental activism ==
In the mid-2000s, Nace turned his focus to anti-coal activism. He became active in efforts to block the development and use of coal power plants in the United States through sit–ins at coal mines and banks. At the time, he argued that coal usage was creating a "clear planetary crisis" but that implementing a solution is being blocked by "well-financed lobbying and PR sponsored by the coal and utility companies."

From a climate perspective, coal is far and away our worst problem because the remaining reserves are so much larger than those of other fossil sources like conventional oil and gas. NASA climate chief James Hansen says that phasing out coal emissions is "80% of the solution to the global warming crisis." In other words, phasing out coal is really the "silver bullet" for stopping global warming. – Ted Nace

He was described in the Huffington Post as "one of the amazing brains and strategists behind the anti-coal movement."

=== Global Energy Monitor ===
In 2007, Nace founded CoalSwarm, a website affiliated with Earth Island Institute, to share information similar to Wikipedia and Citizendium, but focused on coal. In 2009, Coalswarm started a tracker database of global coal-fired power stations that became "widely respected" by academic researchers, media outlets, and governments. In 2018, Coalswarm changed its name to Global Energy Monitor and became an independent organization, expanding coverage to include natural gas pipelines, steel plants, coal mines, and other energy infrastructures.

== Publications ==
=== Books ===
- Climate Hope: On the Front Lines of the Fight Against Coal, by Ted Nace, 2010. ISBN 978-0615314389, 288 pages, paperback.
- Gangs of America: The Rise of Corporate Power and the Disabling of Democracy by Ted Nace, 2003.

=== Computer publishing ===
- LaserJet Unlimited, by Ted Nace and Michael Gardner, 1996.
- Desktop Publishing Secrets by Robert C. Eckhardt, Ted Nace, Bob Weibel, October 1991, Peachpit Press
- Ventura Tips and Tricks, 3rd edition, by Ted Nace, Daniel Will-Harris, September 1990, Peachpit Press
- Desktop publishing skills: a primer for typesetting with computer and laser printer, by James Felici, Ted Nace, May 1987, Addison-Wesley Longman Publishing Co., Inc.
