= Life-cycle greenhouse gas emissions of energy sources =

Calculations of the global-warming potential of energy sources

Greenhouse gas emissions are one of the environmental impacts of electricity generation. Measurement of life-cycle greenhouse gas emissions involves calculating the global warming potential (GWP) of energy sources through life-cycle assessment. These are usually sources of only electrical energy but sometimes sources of heat are evaluated. The findings are presented in units of global warming potential per unit of electrical energy generated by that source. The scale uses the global warming potential unit, the carbon dioxide equivalent (CO_{2}e), and the unit of electrical energy, the kilowatt hour (kWh). The goal of such assessments is to cover the full life of the source, from material and fuel mining through construction to operation and waste management.

In 2014, the Intergovernmental Panel on Climate Change harmonized the carbon dioxide equivalent (CO_{2}e) findings of the major electricity generating sources in use worldwide. This was done by analyzing the findings of hundreds of individual scientific papers assessing each energy source. Coal is by far the worst emitter, followed by natural gas, with solar, wind and nuclear all low-carbon. Hydropower, biomass, geothermal and ocean power may generally be low-carbon, but poor design or other factors could result in higher emissions from individual power stations.

For all technologies, advances in efficiency, and therefore reductions in CO_{2}e since the time of publication, have not been included. For example, the total life cycle emissions from wind power may have lessened since publication. Similarly, due to the time frame over which the studies were conducted, nuclear Generation II reactor's CO_{2}e results are presented and not the global warming potential of Generation III reactors. Other limitations of the data include: a) missing life cycle phases, and, b) uncertainty as to where to define the cut-off point in the global warming potential of an energy source. The latter is important in assessing a combined electrical grid in the real world, rather than the established practice of simply assessing the energy source in isolation.

== Global warming potential of selected electricity sources ==
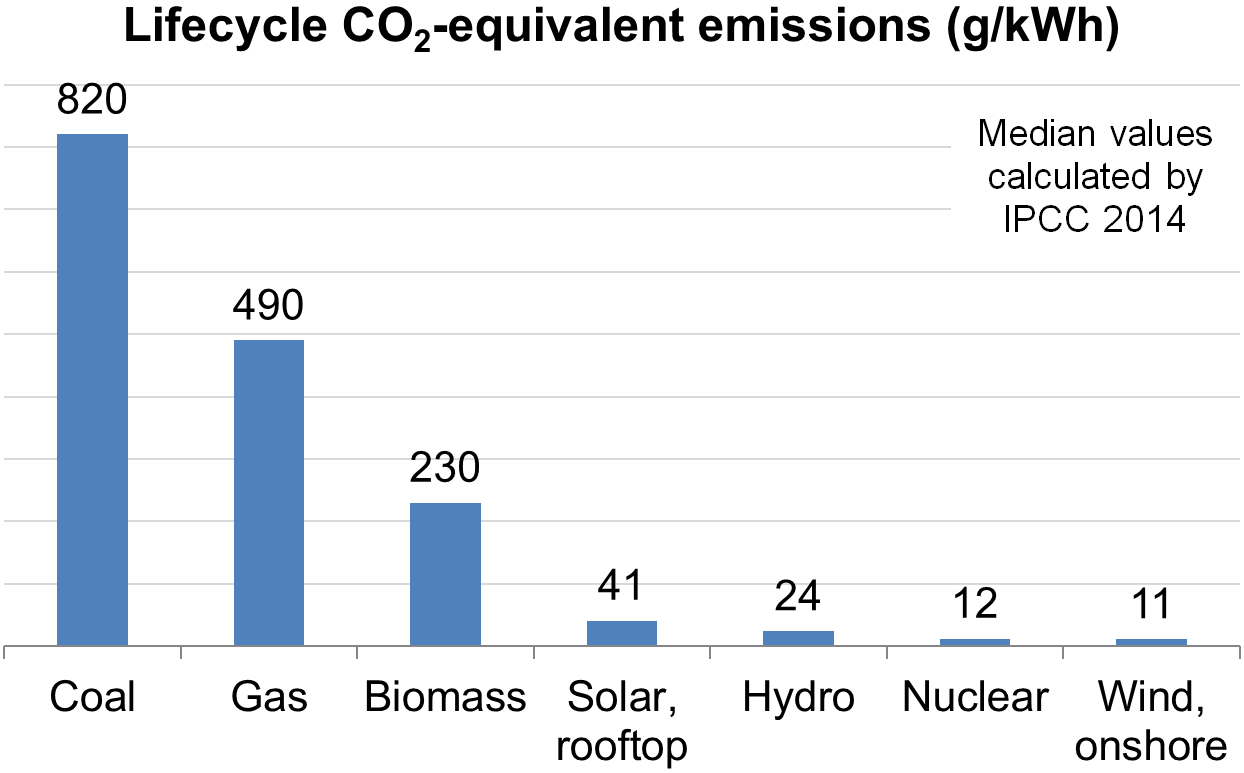
Life-cycle greenhouse gas emissions of electricity supply technologies, median values calculated by IPCC

Life cycle CO_{2} equivalent (including albedo effect) from selected electricity supply technologies according to IPCC 2014. Arranged by decreasing median (g/kWh CO_{2}eq) values.
Technology	Min.	Median	Max.
Currently commercially available technologies
Coal – PC	740	820	910
Gas – combined cycle	410	490	650
Biomass – Dedicated	130	230	420
Solar PV – Utility scale	18	48	180
Solar PV – rooftop	26	41	60
Geothermal	6.0	38	79
Concentrated solar power	8.8	27	63
Hydropower	1.0	24	2200^{1}
Wind Offshore	8.0	12	35
Nuclear	3.7	12	110
Wind Onshore	7.0	11	56
Pre‐commercial technologies
Ocean (Tidal and wave)	5.6	17	28

^{1} see also environmental impact of reservoirs#Greenhouse gases.

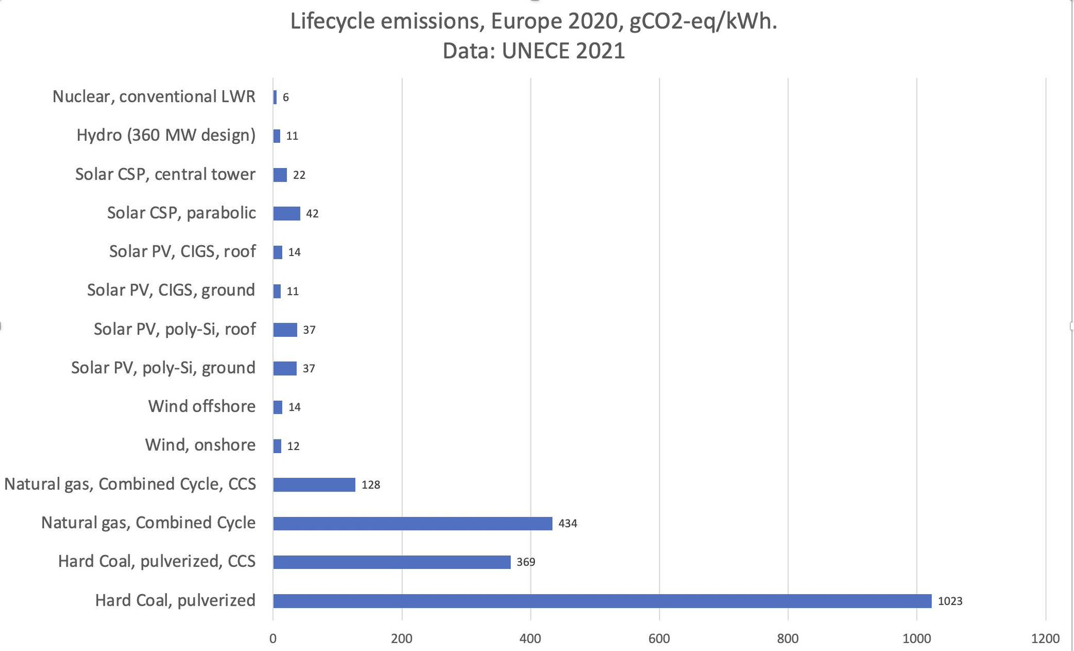
Lifecycle GHG emissions, in g CO_{2} eq. per kWh, UNECE 2020

Lifecycle CO_{2} emissions per kWh, EU28 countries, according to UNECE 2020.
Technology		g/kWh CO_{2}eq
Hard coal	PC, without CCS	1000
Hard coal	IGCC, without CCS	850
Hard coal	SC, without CCS	950
Hard coal	PC, with CCS	370
Hard coal	IGCC, with CCS	280
Hard coal	SC, with CCS	330
Natural gas	NGCC, without CCS	430
Natural gas	NGCC, with CCS	130
Hydro	660 MW	150
Hydro	360 MW	11
Nuclear	average	5.1
CSP	tower	22
CSP	trough	42
PV	poly-Si, ground-mounted	37
PV	poly-Si, roof-mounted	37
PV	CdTe, ground-mounted	12
PV	CdTe, roof-mounted	15
PV	CIGS, ground-mounted	11
PV	CIGS, roof-mounted	14
Wind	onshore	12
Wind	offshore, concrete foundation	14
Wind	offshore, steel foundation	13

List of acronyms:

- PC — pulverized coal
- CCS — carbon capture and storage
- IGCC — integrated gasification combined cycle
- SC — supercritical
- NGCC — natural gas combined cycle
- CSP — concentrated solar power
- PV — photovoltaic power

== Bioenergy with carbon capture and storage ==
As of 2020 whether bioenergy with carbon capture and storage can be carbon neutral or carbon negative is being researched and is controversial.

== Studies after the 2014 IPCC report ==
Individual studies show a wide range of estimates for fuel sources arising from the different methodologies used. Those on the low end tend to leave parts of the life cycle out of their analysis, while those on the high end often make unrealistic assumptions about the amount of energy used in some parts of the life cycle.

Since the 2014 IPCC study some geothermal has been found to emit CO_{2} such as some geothermal power in Italy: further research is ongoing in the 2020s.

Ocean energy technologies (tidal and wave) are relatively new, and few studies have been conducted on them. A major issue of the available studies is that they seem to underestimate the impacts of maintenance, which could be significant. An assessment of around 180 ocean technologies found that the GWP of ocean technologies varies between 15 and 105 g/kWh of CO_{2}eq, with an average of 53 g/kWh CO_{2}eq. In a tentative preliminary study, published in 2020, the environmental impact of subsea tidal kite technologies the GWP varied between 15 and 37, with a median value of 23.8 g/kWh), which is slightly higher than that reported in the 2014 IPCC GWP study mentioned earlier (5.6 to 28, with a mean value of 17 g/kWh CO_{2}eq).

In 2021 UNECE published a lifecycle analysis of environmental impact of electricity generation technologies, accounting for the following impacts: resource use (minerals, metals); land use; resource use (fossils); water use; particulate matter; photochemical ozone formation; ozone depletion; human toxicity (non-cancer); ionising radiation; human toxicity (cancer); eutrophication (terrestrial, marine, freshwater); ecotoxicity (freshwater); acidification; climate change, with the latter summarized in the table above.

In June 2022, Électricité de France publishes a detailed Life-cycle assessment study, following the norm ISO 14040, showing the 2019 French nuclear infrastructure produces less than 4 g/kWh CO_{2}eq.

== Cutoff points of calculations and estimates of how long plants last ==
Because most emissions from wind, solar and nuclear are not during operation, if they are operated for longer and generate more electricity over their lifetime then emissions per unit energy will be less. Therefore, their lifetimes are relevant.

Wind farms are estimated to last 30 years: after that the carbon emissions from repowering would need to be taken into account. Solar panels from the 2010s may have a similar lifetime: however how long 2020s solar panels (such as perovskite) will last is not yet known. Some nuclear plants can be used for 80 years, but others may have to be retired earlier for safety reasons. As of 2020 more than half the world's nuclear plants are expected to request license extensions, and there have been calls for these extensions to be better scrutinised under the Convention on Environmental Impact Assessment in a Transboundary Context.

Some coal-fired power stations may operate for 50 years but others may be shut down after 20 years, or less. According to one 2019 study considering the time value of GHG emissions with techno-economic assessment considerably increases the life cycle emissions from carbon intensive fuels such as coal.

== Lifecycle emissions from heating ==
For residential heating in almost all countries emissions from natural gas furnaces are more than from heat pumps. But in some countries, such as the UK, there is an ongoing debate in the 2020s about whether it is better to replace the natural gas used in residential central heating with hydrogen, or whether to use heat pumps or in some cases more district heating.

== Fossil gas as bridge fuel ==
A bridge fuel, bridge technology or transition fuel is a metaphor and policy framework for justifying investments in further use of natural gas as part of the energy transition.

Despite clear science that natural gas infrastructure would not be compatible with global emissions reductions the talking point was advanced by lobbyists for fossil fuel companies starting in the early 2010s. The strategy is compared to similar techno-fixes such as terms like "clean coal" or policy frameworks that overpromise the potential of technologies like carbon capture and storage.

Early climate and energy transition science from 1990s and 2000s often included natural gas power generation in modeling to help with reducing overall emissions; subsequent research has shown that it is neither compatible with zero emissions or economically viable after advances in renewable energy commercialization. The 2023 IPCC Sixth Assessment report concluded that natural gas power plants only make sense under very specific conditions with carbon capture and fugitive gas prevention technologies.

The first use of the "bridge fuel" language is documented in North America, but has been used in other contexts such as Europe and Asia. The use of "natural gas" as a bridge or transitional fuel is in policy in multiple countries, such as Vietnam and Indonesia.

== Missing life cycle phases ==
Although the life cycle assessments of each energy source should attempt to cover the full life cycle of the source from cradle-to-grave, they are generally limited to the construction and operation phase. The most rigorously studied phases are those of material and fuel mining, construction, operation, and waste management. However, missing life cycle phases exist for a number of energy sources. At times, assessments variably and sometimes inconsistently include the global warming potential that results from decommissioning the energy supplying facility, once it has reached its designed life-span. This includes the global warming potential of the process to return the power-supply site to greenfield status. For example, the process of hydroelectric dam removal is usually excluded as it is a rare practice with little practical data available. Dam removal however is becoming increasingly common as dams age. Larger dams, such as the Hoover Dam and the Three Gorges Dam, are intended to last "forever" with the aid of maintenance, a period that is not quantified. Therefore, decommissioning estimates are generally omitted for some energy sources, while other energy sources include a decommissioning phase in their assessments.

Along with the other prominent values of the paper, the median value presented of 12 g CO_{2}-eq/kWhe for nuclear fission, found in the 2012 Yale University nuclear power review, a paper which also serves as the origin of the 2014 IPCC's nuclear value, does however include the contribution of facility decommissioning with an "Added facility decommissioning" global warming potential in the full nuclear life cycle assessment.

Thermal power plants, even if low carbon power biomass, nuclear or geothermal energy stations, directly add heat energy to the earth's global energy balance. As for wind turbines, they may change both horizontal and vertical atmospheric circulation. But, although both these may slightly change the local temperature, any difference they might make to the global temperature is undetectable against the far larger temperature change caused by greenhouse gases.

== See also ==
- Bioenergy with carbon capture and storage
- Carbon capture and storage
- Carbon footprint
- Climate change mitigation
- Efficient energy use
- Low-carbon economy
- Nuclear power proposed as renewable energy
