= Malcolm Grear =

American graphic designer

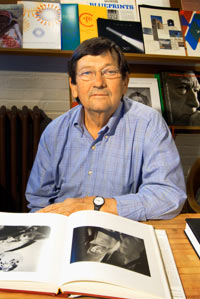
- Malcolm Grear in his studio
- Born: June 12, 1931; Mill Springs, Kentucky, U.S.
- Died: January 24, 2016 (aged 84)
- Occupation: Graphic Designer

Malcolm Grear (June 12, 1931 – January 24, 2016) was an American graphic designer whose work encompassed visual identity programs, print publications, environmental design, packaging, and website design. His visual identity work included logos for the Department of Health and Human Services, the Veterans Administration, the Presbyterian Church USA, and Vanderbilt University. He was the CEO of Malcolm Grear Designers, a design studio in Providence, Rhode Island.

== Early life and education ==
Grear was born in Mill Springs, Kentucky on June 12, 1931, to Carl and Elizabeth (Canada) Grear. After high school Grear joined the Navy, where he trained as an aviation metalsmith, a skill that would subsequently gain him entry to the Art Academy of Cincinnati. There, Grear attended several art and design courses.

== Career ==
Grear started his teaching career at the University of Louisville, before moving on to the Rhode Island School of Design’s graphic design faculty from 1960 to 1998, serving as its chairman from 1965 through 1969. He has received five honorary doctorates. His teaching style emphasized rigor within design thinking framework.

Grear established Malcolm Grear Designers (MGD) in 1960. He has done visual identity programs for a range of clients, including Sonesta International Hotels, Emory University, Colby College Museum of Art, and the New Bedford Whaling Museum. MGD has produced print design work for Scientific American Library, the Guggenheim Museum, the Metropolitan Museum of Art, The RISD Museum, The National Gallery, Harvard University, and the Hallmark Photographic Collection. In the realm of environmental graphics, the studio has designed communication and sign systems for Mayo Clinic, Boston Museum of Fine Arts, Brown University, King Khalid City and the MBTA, along with exhibitions for museums, including MIT's 150th Anniversary exhibition. His design of the Presbyterian Church USA's logo marked the organization's shift to unify and support for abortion rights.

In 1996, MGD was selected to design the "Look of the Games" for the Centennial Olympics in Atlanta, Georgia. The studio was also chosen to design the 31 sports pictograms, the Olympic torch, safety lantern, traveling cauldron, the Olympic medals, and a commemorative poster. Grear, who believes his small studio was chosen "because of our record—because we respect tradition and avoid novelty," commented at the time: "It doesn't get much better than this. This has got to be one of the highest honors for a design firm."

== Death and legacy ==
He died on January 24, 2016, in Wakefield, Rhode Island. The Malcolm Grear Endowed Scholarship Fund was established in 2012 at RISD.

== Books ==
- Grear, Malcolm (1993). Inside/Outside: From the Basics to the Practice of Design. New York: Van Nostrand Reinhold. ISBN 0-442-01667-0.
- Grear, Malcolm (2006). Inside/Outside: From the Basics to the Practice of Design: Second Edition. New York: AIGA/New Riders, An Imprint of Peachpit Press/Pearson Education. ISBN 0-321-44067-6.

== Exhibitions ==
- Inside/Outside: Design and Process, Malcolm Grear Designers, Rhode Island College, 2008
- Graphic Content: Contemporary and Modern / Art and Design, Contemporary Arts Center, Cincinnati, 2007
- Malcolm Grear: The Art of Design (studio retrospective exhibit), 1996–present
  Traveled to: Art Academy of Cincinnati, Art Institute of Boston, Newport Art Museum, Cincinnati Art Museum, Eastern Kentucky University, Hunter Museum of American Art, RISD Museum, Myers School of Art, University of Akron, Université Laval, Quebec City, Canada, University of Tennessee at Chattanooga

== Awards ==
- Rhode Island Heritage Hall of Fame Inductee, 2010
- "Kentucky Star" by the Downtown Lexington Corporation, 2005
- "History Maker of Rhode Island", Rhode Island Historical Society, 2000
- Claiborne Pell Award for Excellence in the Arts, 1998
- National Association of Schools of Art and Design, Citation for Distinguished Service in the Visual Arts, 1997
- John R. Frazier Award for Excellence in Teaching in 1986
- Rhode Island Governor's Award for Excellence in the Arts, 1969
