= Jeff Tapper =

Jeff Tapper is a technologist and theatrical lighting designer based in New York City. He is currently a senior vice president of engineering at Viacom. He was formerly a partner at Digital Primates, a software design company. He has written and contributed to many books and speaks frequently at international conferences about internet technologies, including ColdFusion, Adobe Flash, Adobe Flex, MPEG-DASH, streaming video and software engineering best practices.

== Career ==
Tapper began building internet applications in 1995.

Tapper moved to New York in 1992 to serve as the Gilbert Hemsley lighting intern, and subsequently worked on dozens of theatre productions in New York and regional theatres, including the New York City Opera, the Steppenwolf Theatre, the Mark Taper Forum, and La MaMa E.T.C.

Many of the productions Tapper has lit have been reviewed in The New York Times. Tapper's lighting of the dance/rock production The Tooth of Crime attracted positive reviews.

In the 2000s Tapper wrote and co-wrote a number of how-to books about commonly used software products. He spoke frequently at technology conferences on topics include Video Streaming, XML, Enterprise Application Development, as well as on specific technologies such as Adobe ColdFusion, Apache Flex, MPEG-DASH. He also wrote articles about modern technology, which were published by Adobe Press, Modern Web and InformIT. In 2014 Tapper recorded a JavaScript training video, JavaScript Essentials - LiveLessons, which has been published by Addison-Wesley Professional.

== Bibliography ==
- Allaire Spectra e-Business Construction Kit, Que Publishing, 2000, 0-7897-2365-4
- Advanced Macromedia ColdFusion 5 Application Development. Pearson Education. 2001. ISBN 0-7897-2585-1.
- Dynamic Publishing with ColdFusion MX. New Riders Press. 2003. ISBN 0-7357-1312-X.
- Macromedia Flash MX 2004 ActionScript 2.0 Dictionary. Macromedia Press. 2004. p. 151. ISBN 0-3212-2841-3.
- Object Oriented Programming with ActionScript 2.0. New Riders Press. 2004. ISBN 0-7357-1380-4.
- Advanced Macromedia ColdFusion MX 7 Application Development. Macromedia Press. 2005. ISBN 0-321-29269-3.
- Adobe Flex 2: Training From the Source. Peachpit. 2007. ISBN 978-0-321-42316-0.
- Adobe ColdFusion 8 Web Application Construction Kit, Volume 3: Advanced Application Development. Adobe Press. 2008. ISBN 978-0-321-51547-6.
- Adobe Flex 3: Training From the Source. Peachpit. 2007. ISBN 978-0-321-52918-3.
- Adobe Systems Flex 3: Training From the Source. Peachpit. 2008. ISBN 978-986-6587-25-2.
- Adobe Flex 3. Anaya Multimedia. 2008. ISBN 978-84-415-2492-7.
- Adobe Flex 3: Training from the Source. Pearson. 2008. ISBN 978-2-7440-2288-3.
- Adobe Flex 3: Training from the Source. Wikibook.co.kr. 2008. ISBN 978-89-92939-16-4.
- Adobe Flex 3. Helion. 2008. ISBN 978-83-246-1966-5.
- Adobe AIR 1.5 Cookbook. O'Reilly Media. 2009. ISBN 978-0-596-52250-6.
- Breaking out of the Web Browser with Adobe AIR. New Riders Press. 2009. ISBN 978-0-321-50356-5.
- Adobe Flex 4: Training From the Source Volume 1. Peachpit. 2010. ISBN 978-0-321-66050-3.
- Adobe Flex 4.5: Fundamentals Training From the Source. Peachpit. 2010. ISBN 978-0-321-77712-6.
