= Power plant comparison =

Power plant comparison can refer to:

- Comparisons of life-cycle greenhouse gas emissions
- Relative cost of electricity generated by different sources

In addition, there is a comparison of plant costs in Economics of new nuclear power plants
