= Neumeier =

Neumeier is a surname. Notable people with the surname include:

- Bob Neumeier (c. 1951 – 2021), American sportscaster
- Dan Neumeier (born 1948), American baseball player
- Edward Neumeier (born 1957), American screenwriter, producer and director
- Jack Neumeier (1919–2004), American football coach and creator of the spread offense
- John Neumeier (born 1939), American ballet dancer, choreographer, and director
- Karl G. Neumeier (1889-1992), American lawyer and politician
- Mani Neumeier (born 1940), German rock musician
- Marty Neumeier (born 1947), American author
- Shain Neumeier (born 1987), American attorney
- Tom Neumeier (1921–1991), Dutch Olympic rower

== See also ==
- Newmeyer
