= Larry Pina =

American writer (born 1947)

Larry Pina (born November 12, 1947) is an author of five do-it-yourself repair manuals for Apple Macintosh computers and peripherals. Pina authored the Mac shareware utility Test Pattern Generator (TPG) which allowed users to test and measure various video screen characteristics via test patterns. Among other circumstances, Mac users could use the TPG utility after performing hardware upgrades to check if the screen alignment needed adjusting. According to several of the books, Pina was living in Westport, Massachusetts when they were published.

== Books ==
- Macintosh Repair & Upgrade Secrets (1990, Hayden Books)
- Macintosh Printer Secrets (1990, Hayden Books)
- Macintosh II Repair and Upgrade Secrets (1991, Brady Publishing)
- The Dead Mac Scrolls (1992, Goldstein & Blair)
- Mac Classic and SE Repair and Upgrade Secrets (1993, Peachpit Press)

== See also ==
- Right to repair
