= Marty Neumeier =

American author and speaker (born 1947)

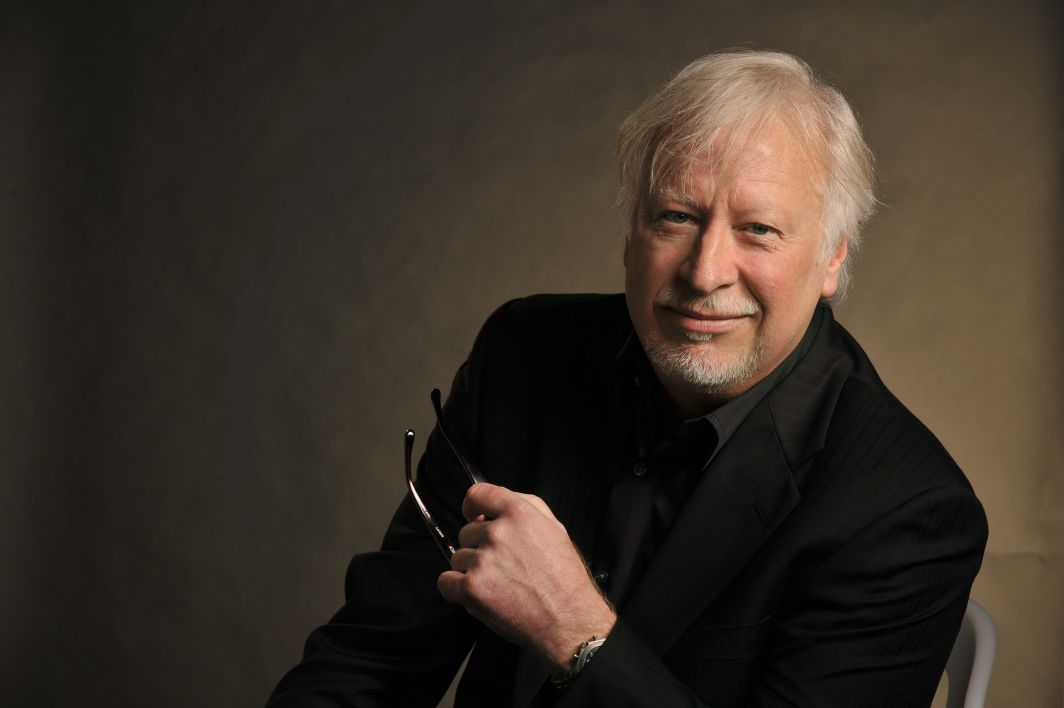
- Born: October 10, 1947 (age 79)
- Occupations: Author, designer, consultant
- Writing career
- Genre: non-fiction
- Notable works: The Brand Gap, Zag, Metaskills

Marty Neumeier (born October 10, 1947) is an American author and speaker who writes about brand, design, innovation, and creativity. He is currently Director of CEO Branding for Liquid Agency, a branding agency in San Jose, California.

== Career ==
Neumeier attended Art Center College of Design from 1967 to 1969. For 15 years he worked in advertising and brand design as a communication designer and writer in Southern California. In 1984 he moved to Silicon Valley to work with clients such as Adobe, Apple, Hewlett-Packard, Microsoft, and Symantec. By 1998 his firm Neumeier Design Team created retail packaging for software products, including Filemaker, Norton Antivirus, Apple system software, and HP LaserJet. He was also a contributing editor for the magazine Communication Arts.

In 1996 Neumeier founded the "seminal but now-defunct design magazine Critique", a quarterly publication about design thinking. Critique's designer contributors included Robert Bringhurst, Ivan Chermayeff, Milton Glaser, Steven Heller, Stefan Sagmeister, Paula Scher, David Stuart and Massimo Vignelli.

In 2003, Neumeier started Neutron, a San Francisco consulting firm specializing in internal branding, and wrote three books: The Brand Gap, Zag (included in The 100 Best Business Books of All Time by Jack Covert and Todd Sattersten.) and The Designful Company. He also served on the board of directors of AIGA, known until 2005 as the American Institute of Graphic Arts, developing its first mission statement. He was president of AIGA Center for Brand Experience, where he edited and published The Dictionary of Brand.

In 2009, Neutron merged with Liquid Agency, which named Neumeier the firm's Director of Transformation. At Liquid he wrote two books on business creativity, Metaskills and The 46 Rules of Genius, and an updated version of The Dictionary of Brand for Google. He currently maintains two blog series, Steal This Idea and The Rules of Genius. He has given talks and workshops at events such as the UX conference in London and the Design Management Institute's Remix conference. His slide presentation, The Brand Gap, has been viewed over 25 million times.

== Books ==
- The Brand Gap: How to Bridge the Distance between Business Strategy and Design, 2003, New Riders Press: A book about brand-building in the post industrial age
- The Dictionary of Brand, 2004, AIGA: A pocket-sized glossary of brand terms, co-developed with Willoughby Design. Out of print
- Zag: The #1 Strategy of High-Performance Brands, 2006, New Riders Press: A book offering a framework for brand differentiation
- The Designful Company: How to Build a Culture of Nonstop Innovation, 2008, New Riders Press: A book about branding and creative collaboration for corporate leaders
- Metaskills: Five Talents for the Robotic Age, 2012, New Riders Press: A book about skills for succeeding in the age of intelligent machines
- The 46 Rules of Genius: An Innovator's Guide to Creativity, 2014, New Riders Press: A book of concise insights about how people innovate and create
- The Brand Flip: Why Customers Now Run Companies—and How You Can Profit from It, 2015, New Riders Press: Sequel to The Brand Gap about how to build brands in an era of customer dominance
- Brand A-Z: An Interactive Dictionary of 1,000 Essential Brand Terms, 2017, Amazon Digital Services: An illustrated ebook with hyperlinked terms

== Video ==
Marty Neumeier's Innovation Workshop, 2009, New Riders. An instructional DVD with group exercises.

== Selected articles ==
- "Apple Computer", Communication Arts, May/June 1985: A feature article on Steve Jobs, John Sculley, and Apple Creative Services.
- "Herbert Bayer", Communication Arts, September/October 1988: A profile of the last Bauhaus master.
- "Secrets of Design", Critique, 1996–2001: A series of 15 articles on various aspects of design thinking.
- "Six Predictions for the Millenium", Critique, Issue 7, 1998: An article that predicted the dot-com bust and discussed design trends.
- "The Aesthetics of Management", Change This, Issue 54, 2009. An essay on the art of business.
- Dreaming: A Meta Skill for the Future, Harvard Business Review, April 21, 2014. A case-study article on the value of imagination.
- Michael Porter and Clayton Christensen Are Both Wrong About Finding the Future of Business Education, Forbes, July 12, 2014. A call for design thinking instead of traditional business thinking.
- Ten Ways to Jumpstart Creativity, Huffington Post, October 13, 2014. Tips for applying your imagination to business challenges.
- The Rules of Genius: An Innovator’s Guide to Creativity, Harvard Business Review, May 1, 2015. A case-study article on innovation skills.
