= Macintosh Printer Secrets =

Macintosh Printer Secrets is a 408-page hardcover book written by Larry Pina. It was first published in 1990 by Hayden Book Company, and is now out of print. The book teaches about dot matrix and ink-jet printers on the Apple Macintosh personal computers.

== See also ==
- Larry Pina
