= Energy in Vietnam =

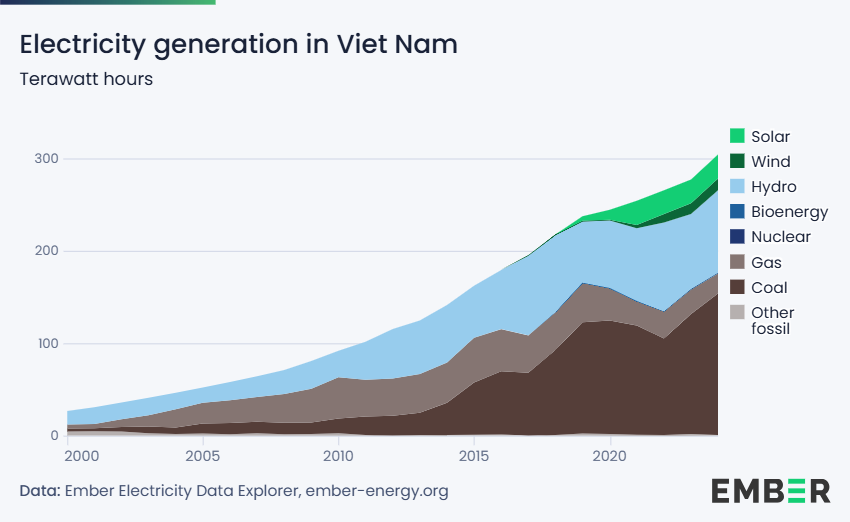
Electricity generation by source in Vietnam in terawatt hours

Vietnam is a quickly growing developing economy with a relatively high growth in demand for energy. Vietnam has a diverse energy fuel resource of various types such as coal, natural gas, petroleum, hydropower and renewables such as solar and wind energy. Since the early 2020s, the country has been successful in renewable energy deployment, especially solar and wind power development.

While historically hydroelectric has been the dominant source of energy generation, coal has been the key power generation source since 2018. Coal accounted for about 30% of installed capacity and 47% of electricity generation in 2021. The high use of coal makes Vietnam an increasingly important emitter of carbon dioxide, contributing to climate change. Current energy policy predicts an increase in Natural gas in Vietnam to substitute for coal, but significant delays in deployment of gas infrastructure and disruptions like the 2026 war in Iran have slowed growth of the technology.

The energy infrastructure of Vietnam is highly centralized with centralized state planning, and national industries such as the state owned Petrovietnam controlling fossil fuel infrastructure. Current energy policy is dictated by the Power Development Plan 8, which had a revised version of the policy adopted in 2025.

== Total primary energy supply (domestic, import) by type ==
Table 1: Progress of primary energy supply between 2000‑2015 in kilotonnes of oil equivalent (KTOE)

	2000	2005	2010	2011	2012	2013	2014	2015
Coal	4,372	8,376	14,730	15,605	15,617	17,239	19,957	24,608
Oil	7,917	12,270	17,321	16,052	15,202	14,698	17,700	19,540
Gas	1,441	4,908	8,316	7,560	8,253	8,522	9,124	9,551
Hydro power	1,250	1,413	2,369	3,519	4,540	4,468	5,146	4,827
Non-commercial energy	14,191	14,794	13,890	14,005	14,121	13,673	12,745	11,925
Electricity import		33	399	333	125	200	124	136
Total	29,171	41,794	57,025	57,075	57,857	58,801	64,797	70,588

=== Coal ===
Vietnam had the fastest growth in coal use in Southeast Asia during 2011-2021, at an annual growth rate of 11%.

According to data of the Ministry of Industry and Trade (MOIT), 10 months of 2018 coal production was estimated at 34.35 million tons, up 10% over the same period in 2017, of which clean coal output of Vinacomin (TKV) was 29.6 million tons, up 10.9% over the same period last year. By the end of 2018, TKV's coal production reached 36.95 million tons. In 2019, TKV aimed to produce 40 million tons while consumption was up to 42 million tons, exceeding 2 million tons compared to production.

On 2019-04-09, the amount of raw coal produced by this group reached over 10.7 million tons (of which 10.5 million tons were exported). To meet the above figure, TKV had to import another 1.2 million tons of coal to mix, while reducing its inventory to 6.2 million tons of coal.

Table 2: Vietnam's coal import volume from 2014 to 2017 (tons)

Year	2014	2015	2016	2017	2018	2019	2020
Total volume of imported coal	3,095,801	6,935,667	13,276,869	14,488,002	22,857,153	43,770,107	54,811,643

The total volume of coal imported into Vietnam from 2014 to 2017 reached nearly 38 million tons and has an increasing trend. In terms of markets, Australia, Indonesia and China are the three largest coal supply markets for Vietnam. According to the statistics of the General Department of Vietnam Customs, in 2020, Vietnam imported 54,8 million tons of coal, worth US$3,7 billion.

Table 3: Vietnam's coal balance in 2017 (million tons)

Enterprise	Estimate the beginning of the period	Exploit	Import	Export	Domestic Use	Estimate the end of the period
Total	11,705	37,739	14,488	2,228	52,149	9,555
TKV	10,000	32,200	0,158	1,517	32,583	8,258
Dong Bac	0,500	5,100	0,513	0,021	6,000	0,092
Vietmindo	0,005	0,439	0	0,439	0	0,005
Formosa	0,300	0	4,006	0,173	3,833	0,300
Hoa Phat	0,100	0	1,177	0	1,177	0,100
EVN	0,500	0	3,217	0	3,217	0,500
Others	0,300	0	5,417	0,078	5,339	0,300

It is forecasted that in the future, domestic coal resources will not meet the demand for consumption in general, electricity production in particular and must be imported in huge quantities ... (2020: 86 million tons, 2025: 121 million tons and 2030: 156 million tons). Mr. Sabyasachi Mishra, mineral sales manager at Tata International, predicts that Vietnam's annual coal imports will increase from 20 million tons to 30 million tons in the next one or several years, especially when domestic coal reserves are downward trend.

Vietnam has joined the Global Coal to Clean Power Transition Statement at COP26 in 2021. However, similar to other developing countries such as Indonesia, it faces significant challenges to realise the pledge.

=== Oil ===
Oil was discovered in Vietnam in the mid-1980s and oil production began in the 1990s.

According to the report of Petrovietnam (PVN), the total production of oil exploitation in 2017 reached 25.41 million tons, exceeding 1.60 million tons of oil equivalent compared to the Government plan assigned at the beginning of the year, but exploration increased reserves to only 4 million tons. In particular, oil exploitation reached 15.52 million tons, exceeding 1.32 million tons.

In 2018, the oil production reached nearly 14 million tons (of which, the domestic oil production was about 11.3 million tons), down from the level of over 15.52 million tons in 2017.

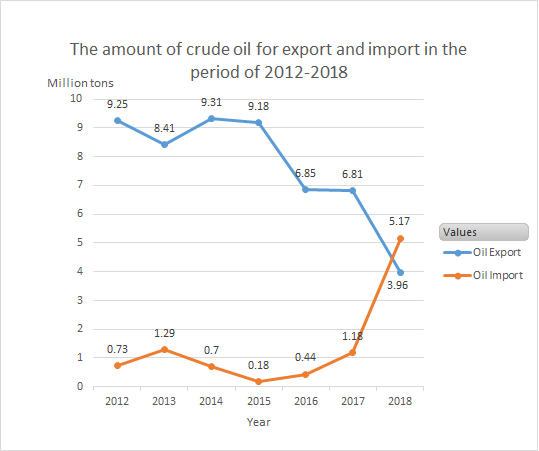
Figure 1: The amount of crude oil for export and import in the period of 2012–2018

According to government statistics, in the period 2012–2017, crude oil exports were always more than imports, with an average export volume of 8.3 million tons/year, while imports averaged only about 750 thousand tons/year.

In 2018, the whole country exported 3.96 million tons of crude oil, down 41.8% from 2017 and less than half of the annual exports of crude oil in the period of 2012–2017. At the same time, imports reached 5.17 million tons, more than 4 times the figure of 1.18 million tons in 2017, and 7 times more than the annual import figure for the period 2012–2017.

In January and February 2019 the whole country imported more than 1.462 million tons of crude oil (worth US$635.4 million), an increase of more than 16 times in volume and 14 times in value from the same period in 2018. The reason for the sharp increase is the oil demand for production by the Nghi Sơn Refinery.

Oil production in many wells is declining naturally, due to exploitation for too long. In addition, the increase in reserves is so low that from 2018 to 2025, oil production will decrease steadily every year by 10% – equivalent to more than 2 million tons. Lack of capital is the main reason that PVN has not been able to boost oil and gas exploration activities in the past years to increase reserves. The increased output to compensate for the exploitation has reduced to a worrying level, affecting the sustainable development of Vietnam's oil and gas industry. Only a few years from 2018, the total oil and gas production will be only 1/3 of the current production.

=== Natural gas ===
Natural gas in Vietnam is a major feature of energy infrastructure and policy in Vietnam. Though Vietnam has limited domestic production of gas, Vietnam has not historically been a heavy user of natural gas, with limited reserves used for domestic applications such as heating, cooking and power. However, natural gas has been increasingly included in policy and energy mix alongside renewables as part of the phase out of coal. According to a 2023 estimate by the IEA, less than 6.3% of the total energy mix in Vietnam was provided by natural gas. Since 2020, this has been a 479% increase in total usage by volume.

The increase in usage of natural gas has primarily been as part of a policy of using liquefied natural gas to substitute for coal, with the goal of reducing overall emissions of the energy sector. However, despite a goal to reduce coal imports, they have continued to increase coal imports while natural gas use expands resulting in increased overall carbon emissions and fossil fuel use, preventing implementation of policy goals of reducing emissions. Changes in the energy mix and policy are dictated in Vietnam by the national, revised as the 2025 Power Development Plan 8 (2025 PDP8) and the 2024 Electricity Law both which favor renewables, but also include an increase from 0.8 GW to 22.5 GW of imported LNG capacity by 2030.

Energy analysts evaluating the enthusiasm for LNG in policy note that there has not been support for long-term financially viable natural gas markets; it could be more cost effective to install the capacity with renewables, like solar, wind and batteries. Additionally climate policy tracking organizations, have described the policy framework as insufficient for the Nationally Determined Contribution, and increasing the risks of stranded asset and locking in fossil fuel infrastructure for more than 30 years.

In the short term, the implementation of the revised plan implies a significant expansion of natural gas infrastructure, including gas power plants, LNG terminals and gas pipelines. However, as of late 2025, delays in building infrastructure, and global shortages of gas turbines had led to significant delays in installed capacity for generating energy from the gas, likely leading to further delays in meeting 2030 LNG-fired gas plant activation goals. Shortages caused by the closure of the Strait of Hormuz during the 2026 War in Iran will likely further increase the cost of LNG import in Vietnam.

=== Renewables ===
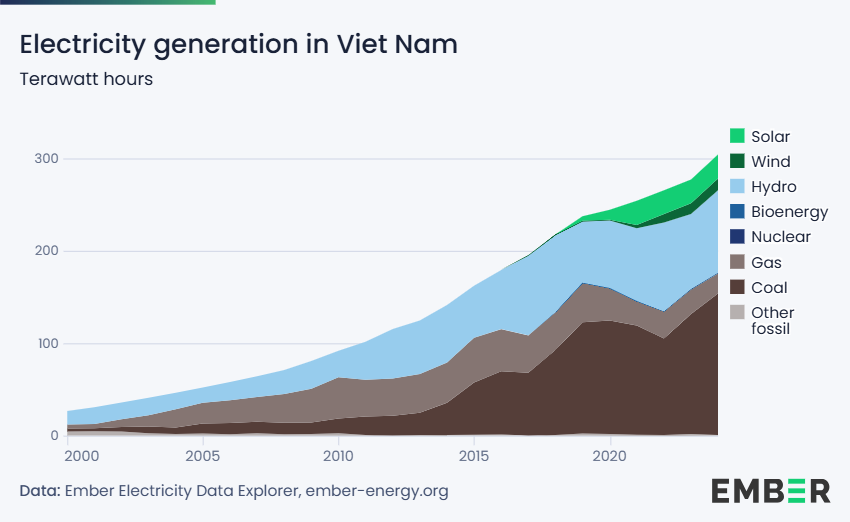
Electricity generation by source in Vietnam in terawatt hours

Vietnam utilizes four main sources of renewable energy: hydroelectricity, wind power, solar power and biomass. At the end of 2018, hydropower was the largest source of renewable energy, contributing about 40% to the total national electricity capacity. In 2020, wind and solar had a combined share of 10% of the country's electrical generation, already meeting the government's 2030 goal, suggesting future displacement of growth of coal capacity. By the end of 2020, the total installed capacity of solar and wind power had reached over 17 GW. Over 25% of total power capacity is from variable renewable energy sources (wind, solar). The commercial biomass electricity generation is currently slow and limited to valorizing bagasse only, but the stream of forest products, agricultural and municipal waste is increasing. The government is studying a renewable portfolio standard that could promote this energy source.

While wind and solar investment remains attractive in Vietnam, existing capacity is under-utilized due to lack of electric transmission capacity and lack of a replacement for the expired feed-in tariff.

The lead-up to the expiration of the initial solar feed-in tariff (FIT) of US$93.5/MWh saw a large increase in Vietnam's installed capacity of solar photovoltaic (PV), from 86 MW in 2018 to about 4.5 GW by the end of June 2019. The number reached about 16.5 GW as of the end of 2020. This represents an annualized installation rate of about 90 W per capita per annum, placing Vietnam among world leaders. As of 2019, Vietnam has the highest installed capacity in Southeast Asia. In 2020, there are 102 solar power plants operating in the country with a total capacity of 6.3 GW. As of 2021, Vietnam has become one of the most successful ASEAN countries in attracting investment in renewable energy and promoting various types of renewables within the country.

Vietnam has the largest offshore wind power potential amount ASEAN countries, with over 470 GW technical potential within 200 km of the coast. This is equivalent to about 6 times the country's total installed capacity of any energy source as of 2022. This offers opportunities for meeting domestic demand as well as exporting to other countries such as Singapore.

Vietnam has the ASEAN largest offshore wind power potential, with over 470 GW technical potential in 200 km of the coast, about 6 times of the country's installed capacity of 2022. This offers huge opportunities for meeting domestic demand as well as exporting other countries such as Singapore.

==== Hydro-power ====
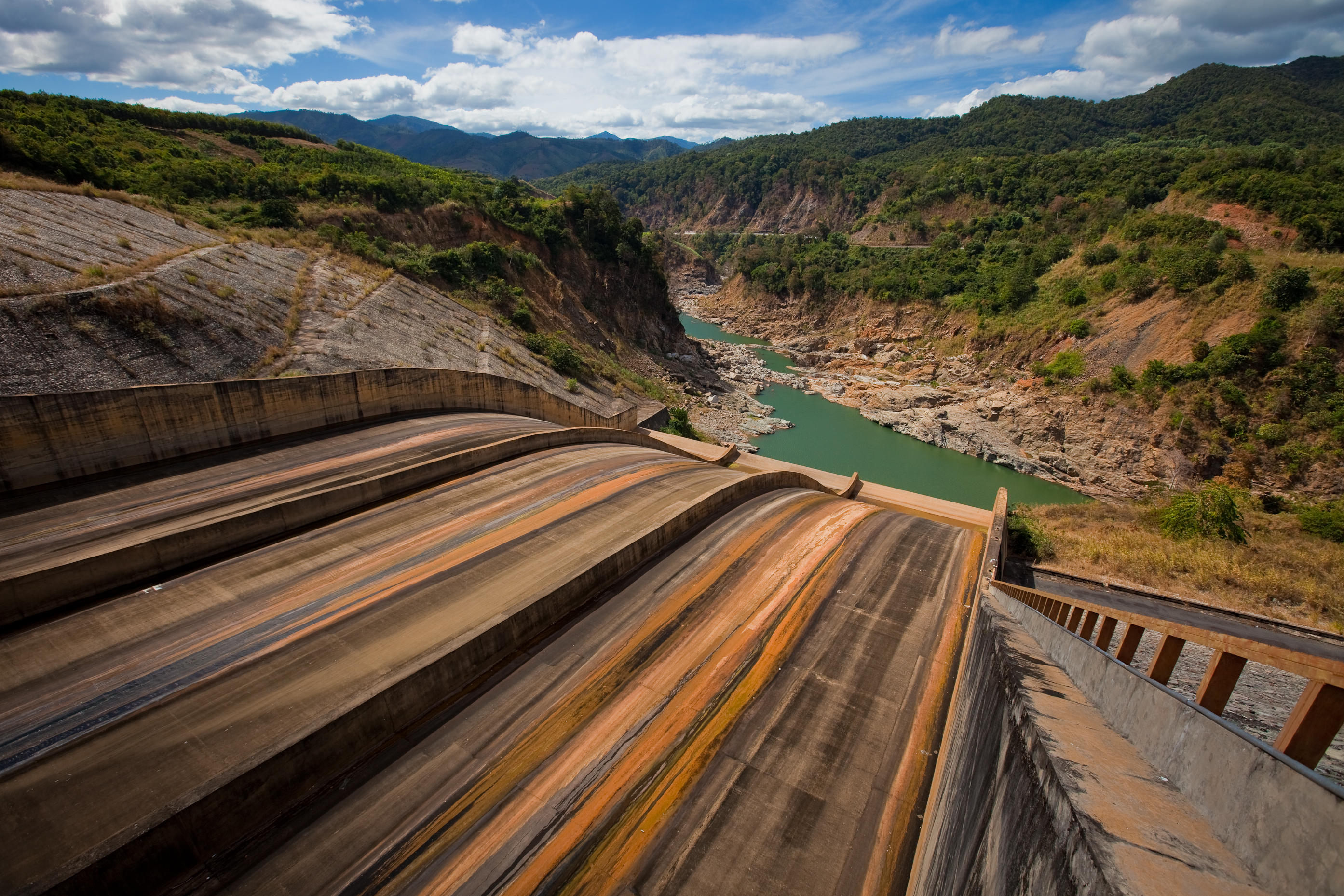
Yaly Hydropower Dam

According to theoretical calculations, the total hydro-power capacity of the country is about 35,000 MW, of which 60% is concentrated in the North, 27% is distributed in the Central and 13% in the South. Technical potential (potentially feasible to exploit) is about 26,000 MW, equivalent to nearly 970 planned projects, can annually produce more than 100 billion kWh, of which small hydroelectricity comes in particular 800 projects, with a total power of about 15–20 billion kWh/year.

In 2017, reports said that large hydro-power power plants with capacity of over 100 MW were almost fully exploited. Plants with favorable locations and low investment costs have also been constructed. Remaining in the near future, small capacity hydro-power projects will be invested for exploitation.

According to the assessment, Vietnam's small hydro-power potential is about 4,000 MW, of which the source with a capacity of 100 kW-30 MW accounts for 93–95%, while the type of source with a capacity of under 100 kW only accounts for 5 – 7%, with total capacity over 200 MW.

As of 2018, there were 818 hydro-power project power plants in the whole country with total installed capacity of 23,182 MW. In which, 385 plants with the total installed capacity of 18,564 MW have been put into operation, 143 projects were being constructed with a total installed capacity of 1,848 MW and 290 investment projects with a total installed capacity of 2,770 MW. There are many dams and hydro-power stations in Vietnam.

== Total final energy consumption (by sector, by type) ==
Table: Total final consumption (TFC) by source – Vietnam (KTOE)

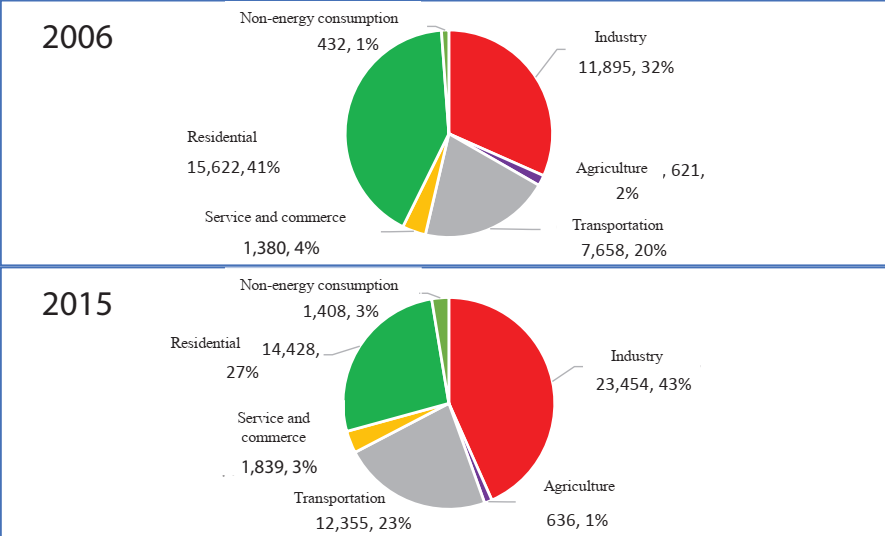
Figure 2: Structure of final energy consumption in 2006 and 2015 per economic sector (million TOE, %)

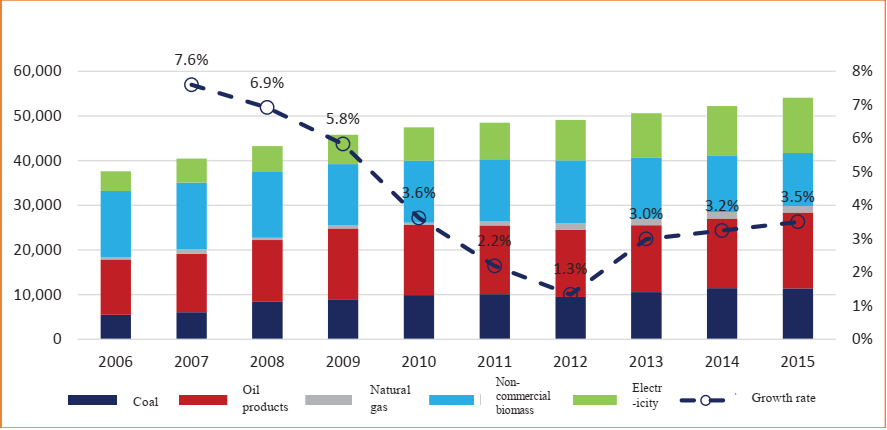
Figure 3: Final energy consumption by type of fuel in the period 2006‑2015 (KTOE)

Year	Coal	Oil products	Natural gas	Geothermal, solar, etc.	Biofuels and waste	Electricity	Heat
1990	1330	2329	0	0	11868	532	0
1995	2609	4226	22	0	12152	963	0
2000	3223	6511	18	0	13413	1926	0
2005	5272	11333	537	0	13954	4051	0
2010	9814	16638	493	0	13824	7474	0
2015	11754	18014	1665	0	14583	12338	0
2018	14172	20750	985	0	8083	16284	0

In the sectorial structure in final energy consumption figure in 2006, residential and industrial sectors took the largest percentage part, respectively 41% and 32%. However, compared to 2015 data, the industrial sector had the highest share, correctively 43% and the residential section had a reduction to 27% of energy demand. The energy consumption percentage of the transportation sector change from only 20% in 2006 to 23% in 2015.

For the final energy consumption classified by type of fuel, the amount of electricity consumed increases significantly from 2006 to 2015. Coal consumption, biomass, oil products remain the same from 2010 to 2013. At that time, the growth rate declined significantly, from 7.6% in 2007 to 1.3% in 2012, then gradually increased to 3.5% in 2015.

== Energy intensity ==
In 2017 the energy intensity of Vietnam's economy (E/G) was 5.7 MJ per year-2010 US$, above the world average of 5.2. That was also higher than other ASEAN countries, for example Thailand (5.3) and Indonesia (3.5). This reflects the high level of energy use associated with Vietnam's industrialization and its heavy reliance on coal.

Energy efficiency in economic development is expressed through these indicators: Energy intensity, GDP, Final energy consumption, Power consumption, Power intensity, shown in Table:

Table: Energy efficiency in economic development

Category	2000	2005	2010	2015	2018
GDP (billion USD by 2018 price)	44	67.85	122.4	204.8	241.4
Final energy consumption (MTOE)	25.0	35.7	48.0	54.0	63.0
Energy intensity (kgOE/1000 USD)	568	526	392	264	261
Power consumption (TWh)	22.4	45.6	85.5	151.5	192.9
Power intensity (kWh/1000 USD)	509	672	698.5	739.7	798.2

Through the data in Table 5, it can be seen that the energy intensity has decreased sharply from 568 kgOE in 2000 to less than half, about 260 kgOE in 2015 – 2018, while the power intensity still tends to gradually increasing over the past two decades, from more than 500 kWh (2000) to nearly 700 – 800 kWh (2015–2018).

Table 6: Energy intensity and power intensity of some countries

Indicator	Thailand	China	Korea	Japan	Germany	Vietnam
Energy intensity (kgOE/1000 USD)	199	231	238	154	164	264
Power intensity (kWh/1000 USD)	560	650	350	350	200	740

== Emissions from energy sector ==
After joining the UNFCCC, Vietnam conducts greenhouse gas inventories through the development of the National Notice (NC) and the biennial update report for UNFCCC (BUR). To date, Vietnam has completed the construction of the first and second NCs, BUR1 (2014) and BUR2 (2017).

Vietnam's GHG emissions have been increasing quickly, with the main contributor being fossil fuel combustion which accounted for about 60% of greenhouse gas emissions in 2014. In 2019 Vietnam was the world's 22nd largest CO_{2} emitter from fuel combustion and the 3rd largest in the Association of Southeast Asian Nations (ASEAN).

In the energy sector in Vietnam, GHG is mainly emitted from fuel combustion and dispersal in the process of fuel extraction and transportation. The total amount of GHG emissions in the energy sector in 2013 was 151.4 million tons CO2e. In particular, fuel combustion activities are common in the electricity production, industry and construction, transportation, agriculture / forestry / fisheries and a number of other sectors. This is a major activity of GHG production, accounting for 86.1% of the total GHG emissions nationwide. In particular, with the consumption of large amounts of fuel, accounting for about 60% of total fuel consumption, transportation activities also emit a significant amount of GHG into the atmosphere. The transportation sector emits about 30 million tons of CO2e, the emissions increase rapidly over the years, more than doubling from 12.58 million tons of CO_{2}e (in 2000) to 29.7 million tons of CO_{2}e (in 2013). Meanwhile, road traffic emissions accounted for 90.9%, railway, waterway and airway traffic emissions accounted for nearly 10%, the civil aviation industry also had significant and increasing GHG emissions.

According to research from the International Energy Agency (IEA), the process of using energy causes GHG emissions to account for the largest proportion, about 60% of global GHG emissions annually. Also, Vietnam's GHG emissions will increase 2.7 times and 4.6 times in 2020 and 2030 compared to 2010 emissions. One of the main measures to reduce GHG emissions in the industry energy is implementing energy saving and effective use. Other measures include carbon pricing, which was legalized in the form of emission trading scheme in the Law on Environmental Protection 2020.

Table 7: Trends of emissions/removals among inventory cycles

Year	Sectors (unit: ktCO_{2}e)					
Year	Energy	Industrial processes	Agriculture	LULUCF	Waste	Total
1994	25,637.0	3,807.0	52,445.0	19,378.0	2,565.0	103,832.0
2000	52,774.0	10,006.0	65,091.0	15,105.0	7,925.0	150,901.0
2010	146,170.7	21,682.4	87,602.0	-20,720.7	17,887.0	252,621.5
2013	151,402.5	31,767.4	89,407.8	-34,239.8	20,686.2	259,024.1

Table 8: CO_{2} emission table in Vietnam (unit: KT-C: kilotonnes of CO_{2})
	2006	2007	2008	2009	2010	2011	2012	2013	2014	2015	2016	2017	2018
Total CO_{2} emission	23728	25340	28504	31140	34087	34951	34784	36273	39215	47352	51893	52625	63550
1.CO2 emission by energy	23728	25340	28504	31140	34087	34951	34784	36273	39215	47352	51893	52625	63550
1.1 coal & coal products	10149	10868	13494	14177	16529	17510	17711	19344	22393	27911	31296	31830	42404
1.2 crude oil & petroleum products	10248	10851	10905	12414	12354	12598	11786	11470	11269	14142	15299	15791	16058
1.3 gas	3330	3621	4105	4549	5204	4843	5287	5459	5553	5298	5298	5004	5087
2.CO2 emission by sector	23728	25340	28504	31140	34087	34951	34784	36273	39215	47352	51893	52625	63550
2.1 transformation sector	7491	8010	8448	8824	11332	11000	11328	12146	13698	20309	23380	23132	29789
2.1.1 public utilities	7491	6955	7448	8214	11332	11000	11328	12146	13698	20309	23380	23132	29789
2.1.2 auto-generation	0	930	888	610	0	0	0	0	0	0	0	0	0
2.1.3 gas processing	0	0	0	0	0	0	0	0	0	0	0	0	0
2.1.4 own use & loss	0	125	112	0	0	0	0	0	0	0	0	0	0
2.2 final energy consumption sector	16237	17329	20056	22316	22755	23951	23457	24127	25517	27042	28513	29493	33761
2.2.1 industry sector	7137	8726	10782	10654	11147	11717	11580	12179	14072	16319	16236	29493	18854
2.2.2 transport sector	6238	6659	7107	8460	8277	8888	8779	8622	8222	6561	7270	14251	10222
2.2.3 residential & commercial	2740	2714	2720	2750	2911	2897	2685	2929	2842	3645	4555	10557	10220
2.2.4 other	121	−769	−554	452	420	448	412	397	381	516	452	4568	4310

== See also ==
- Economy of Vietnam
- List of gas power plants in Vietnam
- List of power stations in Vietnam
- Nuclear energy in Vietnam, two planned NPPs
- Renewable energy in Vietnam
