= American Institute of Graphic Arts =

Professional organization for design

AIGA
- AIGA logo
- Founded: 1914
- Type: Professional Association
- Location: Headquarters in New York City
- Region served: United States
- Members: Over 18,000
- Official languages: English
- Key people: Ashleigh Axios, Board President; Bennie F. Johnson, Executive Director
- Employees: 18
- Website: aiga.org

The American Institute of Graphic Arts (AIGA) is a professional organization for design. Its members practice all forms of communication design, including graphic design, typography, interaction design, user experience, branding and identity. The organization's aim is to be the standard bearer for professional ethics and practices for the design profession. There are currently over 25,000 members and 72 chapters, and more than 200 student groups around the United States. In 2005, AIGA changed its name to "AIGA, the professional association for design", dropping the "American Institute of Graphic Arts" to welcome all design disciplines.

== History ==
In 1911, Frederic Goudy, Alfred Stieglitz, and W. A. Dwiggins came together to discuss the creation of an organization that was committed to individuals passionate about communication design. During the eighth annual exhibition of “The Books of the Year” on November 12, 1913, John G. Agar, president of the National Arts Club, announced the formation of The American Institute of Graphic Arts. The National Arts Club was instrumental in the formation of AIGA in that they helped to form the committee to plan to organize the organization. The committee formed included Charles DeKay and William B. Howland and officially formed the American Institute of Graphic Arts in 1914. Howland, publisher and editor of The Outlook, was elected president. The goal of the group was to promote excellence in the graphic design profession through its network of local chapters throughout the country.

In 1920, AIGA began awarding medals to "individuals who have set standards of excellence over a lifetime of work or have made individual contributions to innovation within the practice of design." Winners have been recognized for design, teaching, writing or leadership of the profession and may honor individuals posthumously.

In 1982, the New York Chapter was formed and the organization began creating local chapters to decentralize leadership.

Represented by Washington, D.C., arts advocate and attorney, James Lorin Silverberg, Esq., the Washington, D.C., Chapter of AIGA, was organized as the American Institute of Graphic Arts, Incorporated, Washington, D.C., on September 6, 1984.

== Symbol sign project ==
The AIGA, in collaboration with the US Department of Transportation, produced 50 standard symbols to be used on signs "in airports and other transportation hubs and at large international events". The first 34 symbols were published in 1974, receiving a Presidential Design Award. The remaining 16 designs were added in 1979.

== Annual competitions ==
=== Cased ===
In 2012, AIGA replaced all its competitions with a single competition called "Cased" (formerly called "Justified"). The stated aim of the competition is to demonstrate "the collective success and impact of the design profession by celebrating the best in contemporary design through case studies".

=== 50 Books/50 Covers ===
Since 1941, AIGA sponsored a juried contest for the 50 best designed books published in the previous year, entitled "50 Books/50 Covers". Jurors included booksellers, book publishers, and designers such as George Salter.

In February 2012, AIGA announced that it would cease organizing the contest and that future contests would be organized by Design Observer. This move was criticized at the time. In 2020, AIGA resumed their sponsorship of the competition. In 2023, AIGA celebrated the contest's centennial anniversary.

=== 365 ===
The 365 was an annual design competition for all graphic design other than book design. The last original "365" competition was organized in 2011, after which it was replaced by the "Cased" competition. Starting in 2022, AIGA reintroduced 365: AIGA Year in Design

== Conferences ==
AIGA organized two conferences, the AIGA Design Conference and GAIN: AIGA Design and Business Conference. Both conferences were held biennially and the two were held in alternating years. The first AIGA Design Conference took place in Boston, Massachusetts in 1985. Beginning in 2016, the AIGA Design Conference will be held annually with the 2016 conference held in Las Vegas. Since 2016, conferences have been hosted by Roman Mars.

== National board members ==
As of 2022, the national board consists of

- Cesar Rivera (President)
- Jennifer Ford (Vice President)
- Dawn Davidson (Secretary)
- Art Taylor (Treasurer)
- Alberto Rigau (President's Council Chair)
- Lama Ajinah (Director)
- Victor Davila (Director)
- Rachel Elnar (Director, Incoming President))
- Aleksey Fedorov (Director)
- Nicole Parente-Lopez (Director)
- Eileen Prado (Director)
- Mihali Stavlas (Director)
- Isaiah Steinfeld (Director)
- Reggie Tidwell (Director)
- Ying Zhang (Director)

== Affiliations ==
Between 2005 and 2009, AIGA was briefly a member of Icograda (now called Ico-D). In 2010, it withdrew from the international organization, citing financial reasons.

== International membership ==
AIGA opened up membership beyond local chapters in 2014, for creative professionals living and working outside of the US.

== Publications ==
=== Journals ===
In 1947 AIGA started publishing the AIGA Journal of Graphic Design (ISSN 0736-5322), which in 2000 was renamed Trace: AIGA Journal of Design (ISSN 1471-3497). The journal ceased publication in 2003.

Between 2000 and 2003, AIGA published Loop: AIGA Journal of Interaction Design Education, an “interactive, web-based” research journal on interaction and visual interface design co-sponsored by Virginia Commonwealth University’s Center for Design Studies.

Between 2004 and 2011, AIGA published Voice: AIGA Journal of Design, “an online publication for the discussion of design matters” listing Steven Heller as its editor. Although the journal was stated in “What AIGA is doing and why” and had been cited in scholarly research, after AIGA revamped its website in May 2011, it was subsumed under AIGA’s main site and ceased to exist as a distinct entity.

=== Books ===
As part of its strategy to “publish critical thinking about design and designing”, AIGA also “copublishes selected works by thought leaders in design” under the imprint of “AIGA Design Press”. Published titles include

- The Open Brand: When Push Comes to Pull in a Web-Made World (Kelly Mooney and Nita Rollins, 2008)
- Digital Foundations: Intro to Media Design with the Adobe Creative Suite (Xtine Burrough and Michael Mandiberg, 2008), which was released under a Creative Commons license
- Designing for Interaction: Creating Smart Applications and Clever Devices (Dan Saffer, 2006)
- Designing With Web Standards (Jeffrey Zeldman, 2006)
- Inside/Outside: From the Basics to the Practice of Design (Malcolm Grear, 2006)
- ZAG: The Number-One Strategy of High-Performance Brands (Marty Neumeier, 2006)
- Do Good: How Design Can Change the World (David B. Berman, 2008)
- Writing for Visual Thinkers: A Guide for Artists and Designers (Andrea Marks, 2011)

AIGA has also published the periodically updated AIGA professional practices in graphic design including a translation to simplified Chinese.

=== Other publication activities ===
In 2014, AIGA's editorial director Perrin Drumm created Eye on Design as a source for new and emerging graphic designers. Founded first as an online blog, Eye on Design grew into a multimedia platform that included a tri-annual print magazine, conference, event series, weekly newsletter, and social media activations."

== See also ==
- List of AIGA medalists
