= Natural gas in Vietnam =

Fossil fuel used in Vietnam

Natural gas in Vietnam is a major feature of energy infrastructure and policy in Vietnam. Though Vietnam has limited domestic production of gas, Vietnam has not historically been a heavy user of natural gas, with limited reserves used for domestic applications such as heating, cooking and power. However, natural gas has been increasingly included in policy and energy mix alongside renewables as part of the phase out of coal. According to a 2023 estimate by the IEA, less than 6.3% of the total energy mix in Vietnam was provided by natural gas. Since 2020, this has been a 479% increase in total usage by volume.

The increase in usage of natural gas has primarily been as part of a policy of using liquefied natural gas to substitute for coal, with the goal of reducing overall emissions of the energy sector. However, despite a goal to reduce coal imports, they have continued to increase coal imports while natural gas use expands resulting in increased overall carbon emissions and fossil fuel use, preventing implementation of policy goals of reducing emissions. Changes in the energy mix and policy are dictated in Vietnam by the national, revised as the 2025 Power Development Plan 8 (2025 PDP8) and the 2024 Electricity Law both which favor renewables, but also include an increase from 0.8 GW to 22.5 GW of imported LNG capacity by 2030.

Energy analysts evaluating the enthusiasm for LNG in policy note that there has not been support for long-term financially viable natural gas markets; it could be more cost effective to install the capacity with renewables, like solar, wind and batteries. Additionally climate policy tracking organizations, have described the policy framework as insufficient for the Nationally Determined Contribution, and increasing the risks of stranded asset and locking in fossil fuel infrastructure for more than 30 years.

In the short term, the implementation of the revised plan implies a significant expansion of natural gas infrastructure, including gas power plants, LNG terminals and gas pipelines. However, as of late 2025, delays in building infrastructure, and global shortages of gas turbines had led to significant delays in installed capacity for generating energy from the gas, likely leading to further delays in meeting 2030 LNG-fired gas plant activation goals. Shortages caused by the closure of the Strait of Hormuz during the 2026 War in Iran will likely further increase the cost of LNG import in Vietnam.

== Policy context ==
Vietnam's economy has a rapidly growing demand for energy, with planning projects under the National Power Development, suggesting additions of 6,500-8,200MW annually. The implementation of the national Power Development Plan 8 is the responsibility of the Ministry of Industry and Trade.

In 2025, Politburo Resolution 70 focused on reducing the overall greenhouse gas emissions in Vietnam by 15–35% while maintaining energy security. The goal is to increase generation by 2030 while reducing carbon emissions through investments in nuclear power, expanded hydropower, pumped-storage hydropower, LNG-to-power projects, wind power, and solar power.

=== LNG growth ===
The Vietnamese Government had planned on growing the use of natural as part of their Power Development Plan 8, first developed during 2020-22 and issued in 2023 and updated in 2025. A 2022 evaluation of investment costs assumed 21 billion dollars of additional investment from mixed sources through 2050, as the use of natural gas increased to 4.5 times 2025 usage. The government communicates additional fossil fuel infrastructure as an important part of energy security.

==== International relations and financing ====
Part of the Just Energy Transition Partnership financing framework allows for LNG and natural gas use increases in Vietnam. The environmental organization International Rivers critiqued the approach for including LNG and other speculative technologies.

Some Investor-focused analysts have highlighted the need for additional LNG imports to Vietnam, particularly from the United States.

Japan is also heavily invested in gas infrastructure in Vietnam, issuing large gas infrastructure loans in 2026 for gas fired power plants.

A 2022 report by the climate finance group Re Course highlighted that the World Bank framework for support is partly responsible for the lock-in of natural gas infrastructure.

== Economics and usage ==
National gas fields in Vietnam supply the majority of the natural gas used in the country. However, the Power Development Plan 8 relies heavily on importing of Natural Gas from other countries as LNG shipments, particularly the United States. In 2025, Vietnam also took shipments from Russia.

Though the 2025 Power Development Plan 8 implies greater demand for LNG in the future, the current regulation is not creating sufficient demand and cost effective "bankable" contracts for imports. A 2025 analysis found significant growth of demand for energy generation, but gas infrastructure was unable to keep up with the speed energy demand growth.

== Industry and infrastructure ==
The state owned oil and gas company Petrovietnam drives many of the decisions about gas and LNG infrastructure, through its Petro Gas subsidiary.

=== Gas exploitation ===
Though national production of natural gas is available in Vietnam, production peaked at 10 billion cubic meters (bcm) in 2015.

=== Infrastructure and transport ===
The Power Development Plan 8 implied constructing eight additional LNG terminals for access to additional foreign-purchased gas. The LNG terminals are an important part of the infrastructure expansion as used for importing gas. Analysts evaluating the long-term cost of LNG terminals (commissioned in Cai Mep and Thi Vai terminals) may "lock" Vietnam into fossil fuel dependency for decades, potentially diverting funds from renewable energy projects. As of 2025, only one terminal was operating in Thị Vải.

As of 2022, Vietnam had 57 liquefied petroleum gas (LPG) storage warehouses with a total capacity of 519,341 m3 .

As of 2022, Petrovietnam owns and operates eight gas pipelines in the country. Power Development Plan 8 implied constructing 22 additional pipelines for distribution of gas.

==== Energy generation ====
According to Global Energy Monitor, there are only 10 operating oil and gas energy plants in Vietnam as of 2026. While the government's plans imply opening many more, multiple multibillion dollar LNG plants have struggled to open, because of delays in land acquisition, supply chains, financing and construction. The only major new LNG capacity to come online in recent years are Nhon Trach 3 and 4 LNG, which provided 1.6 megawatts of generation capacity in late 2025.

== Impacts ==
=== Climate change ===
According to the IEA, in 2023, natural gas accounted for 4% of total emissions. In 2025, Politburo Resolution 70 focused on reducing the overall greenhouse gas emissions in Vietnam by 15–35% while maintaining energy security. The climate policy tracking organization Climate Action Tracker describes the policy of increasing LNG imports in the energy grid as "locking in" emissions in a way that makes policy "critically insufficient" for climate action.
