= Newmeyer =

Newmeyer is a surname. Notable people with the surname include:

- Don Newmeyer (1902–1992), American player and coach of gridiron football, father of Julie Newmar
- Fred C. Newmeyer (1888–1967), American actor, film director and film producer
- Frederick Newmeyer (born 1944), American linguist and university professor
- Julia Chalene Newmeyer (born 1933), American actress, dancer and singer known by her stage name, Julie Newmar

== See also ==
- Neumeier
