= Bridge fuel =

Rhetorical strategy for justifying more natural gas

A bridge fuel, bridge technology or transition fuel is a metaphor and policy framework for justifying investments in further use of natural gas as part of the energy transition.

Despite clear science that natural gas infrastructure would not be compatible with global emissions reductions the talking point was advanced by lobbyists for fossil fuel companies starting in the early 2010s. The strategy is compared to similar techno-fixes such as terms like "clean coal" or policy frameworks that overpromise the potential of technologies like carbon capture and storage.

Early climate and energy transition science from 1990s and 2000s often included natural gas power generation in modeling to help with reducing overall emissions; subsequent research has shown that it is neither compatible with zero emissions or economically viable after advances in renewable energy commercialization. The 2023 IPCC Sixth Assessment report concluded that natural gas power plants only make sense under very specific conditions with carbon capture and fugitive gas prevention technologies.

The first use of the "bridge fuel" language is documented in North America, but has been used in other contexts such as Europe and Asia. The use of "natural gas" as a bridge or transitional fuel is in policy in multiple countries, such as Vietnam and Indonesia.

== Policy and scientific context ==
As part of the energy transition and reducing carbon emissions in order to mitigate climate change, governments and policy makers typically look for power plants and other infrastructure to replace carbon-emitting infrastructure operating on coal or oil, especially for dispatchable generation for the times when variable renewable energy is not available. Communicators, lobbyists and fossil fuel companies committed to further investment in fossil fuel infrastructure often propose natural gas as a substitute for the "dirtier" emissions of coal. In particular, natural gas is often framed as a "cleaner" fossil fuel with fewer direct emissions. Some scholars have described this as an attempt of "Big gas" to take market share from the coal industry while delaying renewables.

While early evaluations, including early IPCC reports, assumed natural gas would be an important part of the energy transition, recent scholarship has consistently shown that it is inconsistent with emission reductions goals. The IPCC Sixth Assessment report describing "unabated gas", or gas without 90% emissions reductions through carbon capture and storage, not compatible with international emissions reductions goals. Multiple reviews of policy initiatives that used natural gas as a bridge fuel from coal or oil, found that the claims of lower lifecycle greenhouse emissions are often untrue when factoring in the 35+ year lifecycle of the infrastructure as plants become stranded assets and fugitive emissions from extraction and leaks during transport. Policy frameworks that use bridge fuels consistently overpromise the reduction in emissions and the cost effectiveness of using fossil fuels, instead of investing in renewable energy and other zero carbon technologies.

Other fuels such as biofuel and green hydrogen can often use the same infrastructure as oil or natural gas, so are sometimes treated as a substitutable fuel and policies to use these get described as bridge fuels. Though most climate modeling suggests that these alternative fuels are important for hard-to-abate sectors (such as high-heat industries and aviation), most technologies can rely on renewable energy.

== In different geographies ==
Multiple studies have found that North American policy makers and fossil fuel companies particularly promoted this frame in light of the North American shale gas boom. Notably politicians in the United States, from both political parties argued for natural gas as a bridge away from coal, including Barack Obama.

Countries like Germany in Europe, often have built plans for coal phase-out that include natural gas or hydrogen as transitional fuels. The European natural gas industry aggressively promoted policies which advanced use of natural gas in both EU wide and national energy policies. Despite energy planning documents relying on natural gas as a bridge fuel, a 2023 evaluation of the economics of gas as a bridge fuel found it not to be an "economically justified" policy strategy.

In China, the bridge fuel narrative never took hold, instead nationalist energy rhetoric focused on energy independence.

Countries such as India, Malaysia and Vietnam, often have natural gas as a "transition fuel" factored into their policy frameworks for energy transition.
