= Goldstein & Blair =

- Status: Defunct
- Founder: Arthur Naiman
- Successor: Peachpit Press
- Country of origin: United States
- Publication types: Books
- Nonfiction topics: Computers

Goldstein & Blair Publishing was a publisher of Apple Macintosh-related books in the 1980s and early 1990s, including The Macintosh Bible. They also published one of Larry Pina's books.

Goldstein & Blair was founded by Arthur Naiman, who also founded Odonian Press. Beginning March 1, 1992 Peachpit Press took over distribution of all Goldstein & Blair titles.
