= Global Energy Monitor =

American non-governmental organization

- Abbreviation: GEM
- Formation: 2007
- Type: Non-governmental organization
- Legal status: 501(c)(3) organization
- Purpose: Research and analysis
- Location: San Francisco, California, United States
- Region served: Worldwide
- Executive Director: Justin Locke
- Staff: 80-90
- Website: globalenergymonitor.org
- Formerly called: Coalswarm

Global Energy Monitor (GEM) is a San Francisco–based non-governmental organization which catalogs fossil fuel and renewable energy projects worldwide. GEM shares information in support of clean energy and its data and reports on energy trends are widely cited by governments, media, and academic researchers.

== History ==
Global Energy Monitor was founded in 2007 by writer and environmentalist Ted Nace. Originally named "Coalswarm" and affiliated with Earth Island Institute, the organization created a tracker database of global coal-fired power stations that became "widely respected" by academic researchers, media outlets, and governments. In 2018, GEM became an independent organization and expanded coverage to include natural gas pipelines, steel plants, coal mines, oil and gas extraction sites and renewable energy infrastructures.

== Research ==
Global Energy Monitor produces information about energy infrastructures through datasets, maps, and online profiles of specific energy projects housed on its GEM.Wiki platform. The model has been commended for improving transparency and accuracy for climate governance.

GEM's data has several thousand users worldwide, including governments, international agencies, commercial and non profit organizations, academics, universities, and media outlets. This includes the Intergovernmental Panel on Climate Change, International Energy Agency, Rystad Energy, Oxfam, Sierra Club, Natural Resources Defense Council, Friends of the Earth, Greenpeace, Institute for Energy Economics and Financial Analysis (IEEFA), World Bank, International Monetary Fund, Mercator Research Center, Potsdam Institute for Climate Impact Research, Pembina Institute, Rocky Mountain Institute, Urgewald, World Wide Fund for Nature, Center for Research on Energy and Clean Air (CREA), and International Center for Climate Governance (ICCG), among others.

== List of trackers ==
- Global Cement and Concrete Tracker
- Global Coal Plant Tracker – Global Coal Plant Tracker documents existing, proposed, cancelled, and retired coal-fired power plants worldwide.
- Global Coal Mine Tracker – Global Coal Mine Tracker documents existing, proposed, cancelled, and closed coal mines and projects worldwide.
- Global Coal Project Finance Tracker – Global Coal Finance Tracker surveys the financial institutions, both publicly and privately owned, that have provided funding for coal-fired power stations since 2010.
- Global Integrated Power Tracker
- Global Iron and Steel Tracker
- Global Iron Ore Mines Tracker
- Global Energy Transition Tracker
- Global Energy Ownership Tracker
- Global Gas Infrastructure Tracker – Global Gas Infrastructure Tracker aggregates information on gas projects such as pipelines and terminals.
- Global Oil Infrastructure Tracker
- Global Oil and Gas Extraction Tracker
- Global Coal Terminals Tracker
- Global Oil and Gas Plant Tracker
- Global Solar Power Tracker
- Global Wind Power Tracker
- Global Bioenergy Power Tracker
- Global Geothermal Power Tracker
- Global Nuclear Power Tracker
- Global Hydropower Tracker
- Global Methane Emitters Tracker
- Europe Gas Tracker – Europe Gas Tracker is a comprehensive dataset of fossil gas infrastructure across the European Union.
- Asia Gas Tracker
- Africa Energy Tracker
- Portal Energético para América Latina

== See also ==
- 350.org
- Climate Reality Project
- European Renewable Energy Council
- Greenpeace
- Climate TRACE
