= Dầu Tiếng =

Dầu Tiếng may refer to several places in Vietnam:

- Dầu Tiếng, Ho Chi Minh City: a commune in the former Dầu Tiếng district, previously a township and district capital
- Dầu Tiếng Reservoir: a reservoir formed by damming the Saigon River for irrigation
- Dầu Tiếng district: a former district, dissolved in 2025 as part of the 2025 Vietnamese administrative reform
- Dầu Tiếng Base Camp: a former base camp in Dầu Tiếng, used by U.S. Army and Army of South Vietnam during 1966–1975.
