= Robin Williams (writer) =

American writer

Robin Patricia Williams
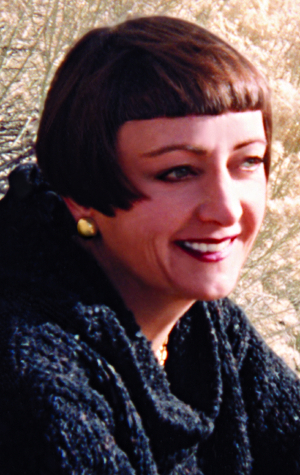
- Born: October 9, 1953 (age 72); Berkeley, California
- Occupations: Non-fiction writer; graphic designer; teacher; lecturer on Shakespeare
- Writing career
- Period: 1989 – present
- Genre: Non-fiction
- Subjects: Computers; graphic design; Shakespeare
- Website: ratz.com

Robin Patricia Williams (born October 9, 1953) is an American educator who has authored many computer-related books, as well as the book Sweet Swan of Avon: Did a Woman Write Shakespeare?. Among her computer books are manuals of style The Mac is Not a Typewriter and numerous manuals for various macOS operating systems and applications, including The Little Mac Book.

== Biography ==
Williams was born in Berkeley, California. She grew up in San Jose and Fremont, California and graduated from Washington High School in Fremont. After high school, she worked in hospitals and then traveled to Europe for two years. She moved to Santa Rosa, California to attend a graphic design program at Santa Rosa Junior College, and began teaching graphic design at the college in 1981. In 2011, she received an MA degree from Brunel University, London, in Shakespeare Authorship studies, and in 2014 she completed a doctoral dissertation for the same university; her doctorate is on the history (and future) of reading Shakespeare – out loud and in community, with an emphasis on editorial practice.

Williams is a graphic designer, typographer, author, college instructor, and lecturer. She began writing in the 1980s, after teaching graphic design and a course about the Mac computer at a California community college. She has taught Shakespeare at Santa Fe Community College and leads the Shakespeare Close Readers reading and discussion groups about individual plays. She has been a leader in the New Mexico Internet Professionals Association and the Santa Fe Mac Users Group. She is a founder of the Mary Sidney Society and iReadShakespeare.

She has three children she raised as a single mother, including while working as a part-time instructor at Santa Rosa Junior College.

== Writings ==
She has written, designed, indexed, and produced more than seventy computer-related books, and by 2005, many of her books had been translated into twenty-three languages. Some of her early works include The Little Mac Book and The Mac is Not a Typewriter. By 2002, The Little Mac Book had published its eighth edition. By 2005, she had published 51 books about Mac computers.

Williams has spent years studying William Shakespeare, and in 2006 issued her book Sweet Swan of Avon: Did a Woman Write Shakespeare? in which she presented evidence in support of the theory that the writer Mary Sidney is the author of Shakespeare's work. Mary Sidney was first proposed as an authorship candidate as part of a group theory by Gilbert Slater in 1931.

== Bibliography ==
=== Books ===
Williams is creating a line of Shakespeare plays called the Readers' Editions, edited and designed specifically for reading aloud in a Shakespeare reading group, independently published as part of iReadShakespeare.org.

- Williams, Robin P. Sweet Swan of Avon: Did a Woman Write Shakespeare?. US: Wilton Circle Press; 2006. ISBN 978-0-321-42640-6

Williams has written more than 70 books, published by Peachpit Press, Berkeley, CA.

Titles by Williams, Robin (writing alone under that name, except as noted).

- The Non-Designer's Presentation Book
- The Little Mac Book, Leopard Edition
- Mac OS X 10.5 Leopard: Peachpit Learning Series, Adobe ReaderDownload
- Mac OS X 10.5 Leopard: Peachpit Learning Series
- Non-Designer's Design and Type Books, Deluxe Edition, The
- Non-Designer's Collection, The
- Non-Designer's Type Book, The, 2nd Edition
- Little Mac Book, Tiger Edition, The
- Mac OS X 10.4 Tiger: Peachpit Learning Series
- The Little Mac Book, Panther Edition
- The Mac OS X Book, Panther Edition
- The Non-Designer's Design Book
- Robin Williams Mac OS X Book, Jaguar Edition
- The Little Mac OS X Book
- The Little Mac Book, 6th Ed. ISBN 0-20135-433-0
- How to Boss Your Fonts Around ISBN 1-56609-102-0
- The Mac is Not a Typewriter, 2nd Ed. ISBN 0-201-78263-4
- The Little iMac Book, 2nd Ed. ISBN 0-20170-446-3
- The Little iBook ISBN 0-201-70093-X

Titles by Williams, Robin, writing with Tollett, John (and, as noted, others).

- Robin Williams Cool Mac Apps: A guide to iLife 08, .Mac, and more
- Robin Williams Design Workshop, Second Edition, Adobe Reader, 2nd EditionDownload
- Podcasting and Blogging with GarageBand and iWeb eBookDownload
- Podcasting and Blogging with GarageBand and iWeb
- Robin Williams Design Workshop, 2nd Edition
- Macs on the Go, Adobe ReaderDownload
- Macs on the Go
- Non-Designer's Web Book, The, 3rd Edition
- Robin Williams Cool Mac Apps, Second Edition: A guide to iLife 05, .Mac, and more, 2nd Edition
- Robin Williams Cool Mac Apps: A guide to iLife, Mac.com, and more
- Little Mac iApps Book, The
- Little iMac Book, The, 3rd Edition
- With both Tollett and Rohr, Dave. Robin Williams Web Design Workshop
- Robin Williams Design Workshop
- The Non-Designer's Web Book, 2nd Edition ISBN 0-201-71038-2
- A Blip in the Continuum

With Cohen, Sandee.

- Non-Designer's Scan and Print Book, The

With Steve Cummings:

- Jargon, An Informal Dictionary of Computer Terms (1993: Peachpit Press)

With Dave Mark:

- Home Sweet Home Page ISBN 0-201-88667-7
