= Peachpit =

Book publisher

- Parent company: Pearson Education
- Founded: 1986
- Founder: Ted Nace and Michael Gardner
- Country of origin: United States
- Headquarters location: 50 California Street; San Francisco
- Publication types: Books, Ebooks, and video
- Nonfiction topics: Technology
- Imprints: Peachpit Press, Adobe Press, Apple Certified, New Riders
- Official website: www.peachpit.com

Peachpit is a publisher of books focused on graphic design, web design, and development. Peachpit's parent company is Pearson Education, which owns additional educational media brands including Addison-Wesley, Prentice Hall, and New Riders.

Founded in 1986, Peachpit publishes the Visual QuickStart Guide, Visual QuickPro Guide, and Classroom in a Book series, in addition to the design imprint New Riders and its Voices That Matter series. Peachpit is the official publishing partner for Adobe Systems, Lynda.com, Apple Certified at Apple Inc, and other tech corporations.

== History ==
Peachpit Press was founded in 1986 by Ted Nace and Michael Gardner, and the two co-authored the company's first book, LaserJet Unlimited. Gardner served on the board of the company from 1986 to 1994 but did not take an active role in the company. Nace and Gardner named the company Peachpit because at the time, Nace and several of his friends were "living and working in a peach colored house in Berkeley that was such a dump it was considered a 'pit.'" Computer writer Elaine Weinmann described how Nace let authors typeset and illustrate their own books and described his publishing approach as user-friendly and innovative. The company grew in size and sales, and had a publishing orientation towards books relating to Apple computers, and was described as a leader in books about digital graphics. Nace served as publisher from 1986 until 1996, when Nancy Aldrich-Ruenzel assumed the publisher position. In 1994, Nace sold Peachpit Press to London-based media conglomerate Pearson PLC. Peachpit continued to operate out of Berkeley until a move to San Francisco in 2012.

The Peachpit offices in San Francisco

Although known as a Mac publisher Peachpit started out publishing Windows related books. Its first Macintosh books were The Little Mac Book and The Mac is not a typewriter, both by Robin Williams. In 1992, Peachpit purchased the Macintosh Bible series from Arthur Naiman's Goldstein and Blair (named after characters in the George Orwell novel 1984). In 1998, when Apple user share was down to 4% of the computer user market and Power Computing was making Mac clones, Peachpit was still publishing a large portion of Mac books. Peachpit published Visual QuickStart Guides for Mac.

== Notable authors ==
Some notable Peachpit authors include: David Blatner, Thom Hartmann, Deke McClelland, Ted Nace, Scott Kelby, Robin Williams, Don Rittner, Joe McNally, Larry Magid, Steve Krug, Jeffrey Zeldman, Jakob Nielsen, Bruce Schneier, Fred Davis, Seth Godin, Gary Wolf, Lynda Weinman, Ben Forta and Maria Langer.

== Publications ==
- Zap!: How Your Computer Can Hurt You - and What You Can Do About It by Don Sellers.
- Kid's Web Kit by Lisa Lopuck
- Ecolinking: Everyone's Guide to Online Environmental Information by Don Rittner
- Computer Privacy Handbook by Andre Bacard
- Gay and Lesbian Online by Jeff Dawson
- Avatars! Exploring and Building Virtual Worlds on the Internet by Bruce Damer
- Inside PostScript by Frank Merritt Braswell, published originally in 1989 by Systems of Merritt later together by Systems of Merritt and Peachpit Press.

== Imprints ==
Peachpit Press also publishes or partners with Adobe Press, Apple Certified, lynda.com, and New Riders.
