= Ben Luc – Long Thanh Expressway =

Road in Vietnam

Ben Luc – Long Thanh Expressway
- Đường cao tốc Bến Lức – Long Thành
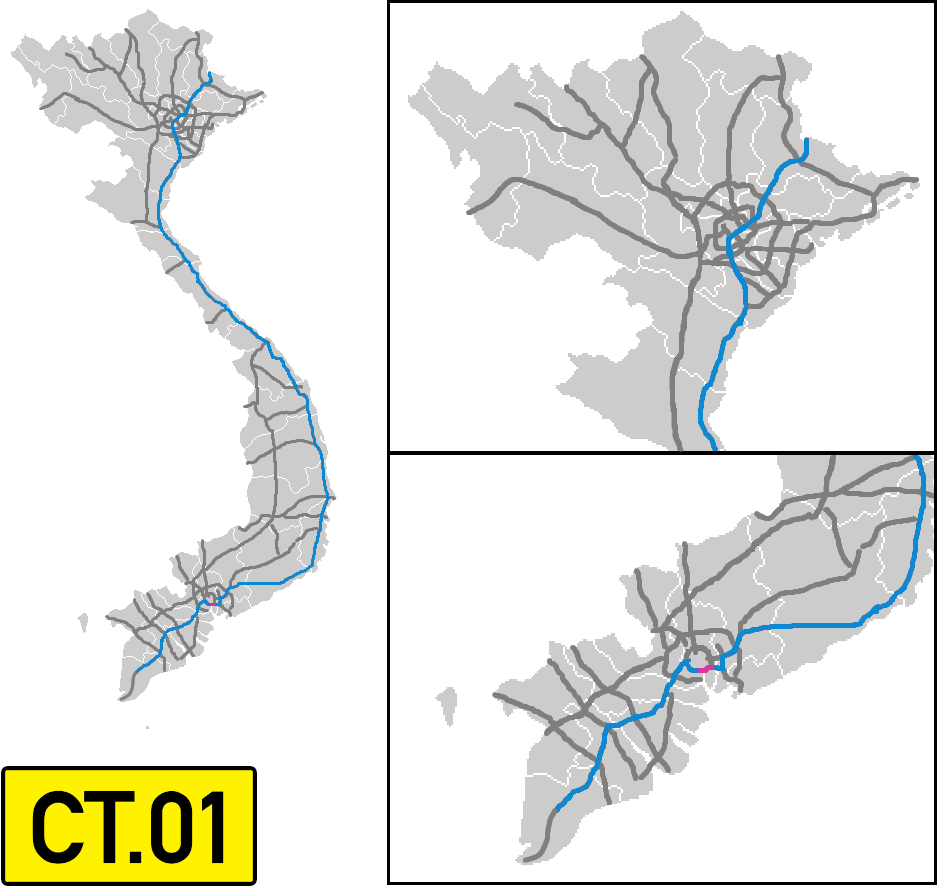

Route information
- Maintained by Vietnam Expressway Corp (VEC)
- Length: 58 km (36 mi)
- Status: Opened
- Existed: October 1, 2026; 6 days ago–present

Major junctions
- West end: at IC Mỹ Yên, Tây Ninh province
- at Bình Chánh, Ho Chi Minh City at Hưng Long (Đa Phước, Bình Chánh district), Hồ Chí Minh City at Phước An (Vĩnh Thanh, Nhơn Trạch district), Đồng Nai AH17 at Phước Thái, Long Thành district, Đồng Nai
- East end: Long Thành, Đồng Nai

Location
- Country: Vietnam
- Provinces: Tây Ninh
- Districts: Long An: Cần Giuộc, Bến Lức; Ho Chi Minh City: Bình Chánh, Nhà Bè, Cần Giờ; Đồng Nai: Nhơn Trạch, Long Thành
- Municipalities: Hồ Chí Minh City, Đồng Nai

Highway system
- Transport in Vietnam

Ben Luc – Long Thanh Expressway (Vietnamese: Đường cao tốc Bến Lức – Long Thành) is an expressway goes through Đồng Nai, Ho Chi Minh City and Long An province (now is Tây Ninh province), Vietnam, most of the route is part of Ho Chi Minh City Ring Road 3 (Mỹ Yên – Vĩnh Thanh section). It connect the Mekong Delta with Long Thanh International Airport, the future main airport of Ho Chi Minh City metropolitan area, and Central Vietnam without passing central Ho Chi Minh City.

The expressway has a length of 58 km (36 mi), of which 20 km is over bridges. It was approved in 2010 with an investment value of VND 31,320 billion (US$1.5 billion), partially funded by a US$636 million Asian Development Bank loan and a VND 10,500 billion (US$450 million) JICA loan. Construction started in 2014, but was delayed due to funding issues. The route includes two large cable-stayed bridges. Construction of the two bridges was suspended since July 2018 due to funding issues over a US$70 million budget overrun. This has delayed the planned completion date from 2018 to 2023, as of July 2022 next completion date is given 3rd Quarter 2025.

As of October 1, 2026, Ben Luc – Long Thanh Expressway was officially opened along with the Bình Khánh Bridge and Phước Khánh Bridge.

== Route details ==
Speed information table (Not applies for Bình Khánh and Phước Khánh bridges)

=== Lanes ===
- Bến Lức - Vĩnh Thanh: 4 lanes + 2 shoulder, 4 parallel lanes
- Vĩnh Thanh - Tân Hiệp: 4 lanes + 2 shoulder

=== Length ===
- Total length: 57.09 km (35.47 mi)

=== Speed limit ===
- Max: 100 km/h (62 mph), Min: 60 km/h (37 mph)
- IC Đa Phước to IC Nguyễn Văn Tạo: Max 80 km/h (50 mph), Min 60 km/h (37 mph)
- Bình Khánh and Phước Khánh bridges: Max 80 km/h (50 mph), Min 60 km/h (37 mph)

== Bridges ==
Some of the bridges on the expressway, from west to east, starts at Mỹ Yên interchange, cross over canals and rivers are: Cần Giuộc Bridge, Bà Lào Bridge, Bình Khánh Bridge, Phước Khánh Bridge, Ông Kèo Bridge, KM52+060 Bridge, Thị Vải Bridge. The two most major bridges here are Bình Khánh Bridge and Phước Khánh Bridge cross the Soài Rạp and Lòng Tàu River, respectively.

=== Bình Khánh Bridge ===
Bình Khánh bridge has a total length of 2,764 meters and a main span of 375 meters, crosses the Soài Rạp River, connecting Hiệp Phước and Bình Khánh.

=== Phước Khánh Bridge ===
Phước Khánh bridge has a total length of 3,186 meters and a main span of 300 meters, crosses the Lòng Tàu River, connecting Bình Khánh, Ho Chi Minh City and Đại Phước (formerly Nhơn Trạch district), Đồng Nai. It is constructed by the Sumitomo - Cienco4 joint venture.

== List of interchanges & features ==
- IC: Interchange, JCT: Junction, SA: Service area (Rest area), TG: Tollgate, TN: Tunnel, BR: Bridge
- The unit of distance is km.
- The periwinkle part (■): The section coinciding with Ring Road 3 (Ho Chi Minh City)

No.	Name	Dist. from Origin	Connections	Notes	Location	
Connect with Ring Road 3 (Ho Chi Minh City)
1	Mỹ Yên IC	0.0	Ho Chi Minh City–Trung Luong Expressway	The expressway entrance under construction for interchange with Ring Road 3	Tây Ninh province	Mỹ Yên
TG	Mỹ Yên Tollgate				Tây Ninh province	Mỹ Yên
2	Bình Chánh IC	3.4	National Route 1		Ho Chi Minh City	Bình Chánh
BR	Ông Thìn Bridge	↓		Passes Cần Giuộc River	Ho Chi Minh City	Hưng Long
3	Đa Phước IC		National Route 50	Connect with Ho Chi Minh City–Soc Trang Expressway	Ho Chi Minh City	Hưng Long
BR	Bà Lào Bridge	↓		Passes Cây Khô Channel	Ho Chi Minh City	Hưng Long – Hiệp Phước Boundary
4	Nguyễn Văn Tạo IC		Nguyễn Văn Tạo Road; Nguyễn Hữu Thọ Road		Ho Chi Minh City	Hiệp Phước
BR	Bình Khánh Bridge	↓		Passes Soài Rạp River	Ho Chi Minh City	Hiệp Phước – Bình Khánh Boundary
5	Rừng Sác IC		Rừng Sác Road	Under construction Connect with Cần Giờ Bridge	Ho Chi Minh City	Bình Khánh
BR	Phước Khánh Bridge	↓		Passes Lòng Tàu River	Ho Chi Minh City – Đồng Nai Boundary	
-	Phước Khánh IC			No construction	Đồng Nai	Đại Phước
6	Vĩnh Thanh IC		Ring Road 3 (Ho Chi Minh City)	Under construction	Đồng Nai	Phước An
7	Phước An IC	50.5	Trường Chinh Road		Đồng Nai	Phước An
BR	Thị Vải Bridge	↓		Passes Thị Vải River	Đồng Nai	Phước An – Long Phước Boundary
TG	Tollgate 7 (Phước Thái)				Đồng Nai	Phước Thái
8	Phước Thái IC	57.6	National Route 51		Đồng Nai	Phước Thái
9	Tân Hiệp IC		Bien Hoa–Vung Tau Expressway	End of the expressway Connect with Ho Chi Minh City–Long Thanh–Dau Giay Expressway	Đồng Nai	Phước Thái
Connect directly to National Route 51C
1.000 mi = 1.609 km; 1.000 km = 0.621 mi: Closed/former; Proposed; Incomplete access; Route transition; Unopened
