= Bình Khánh Bridge =

Bình Khánh Bridge Cầu Bình Khánh
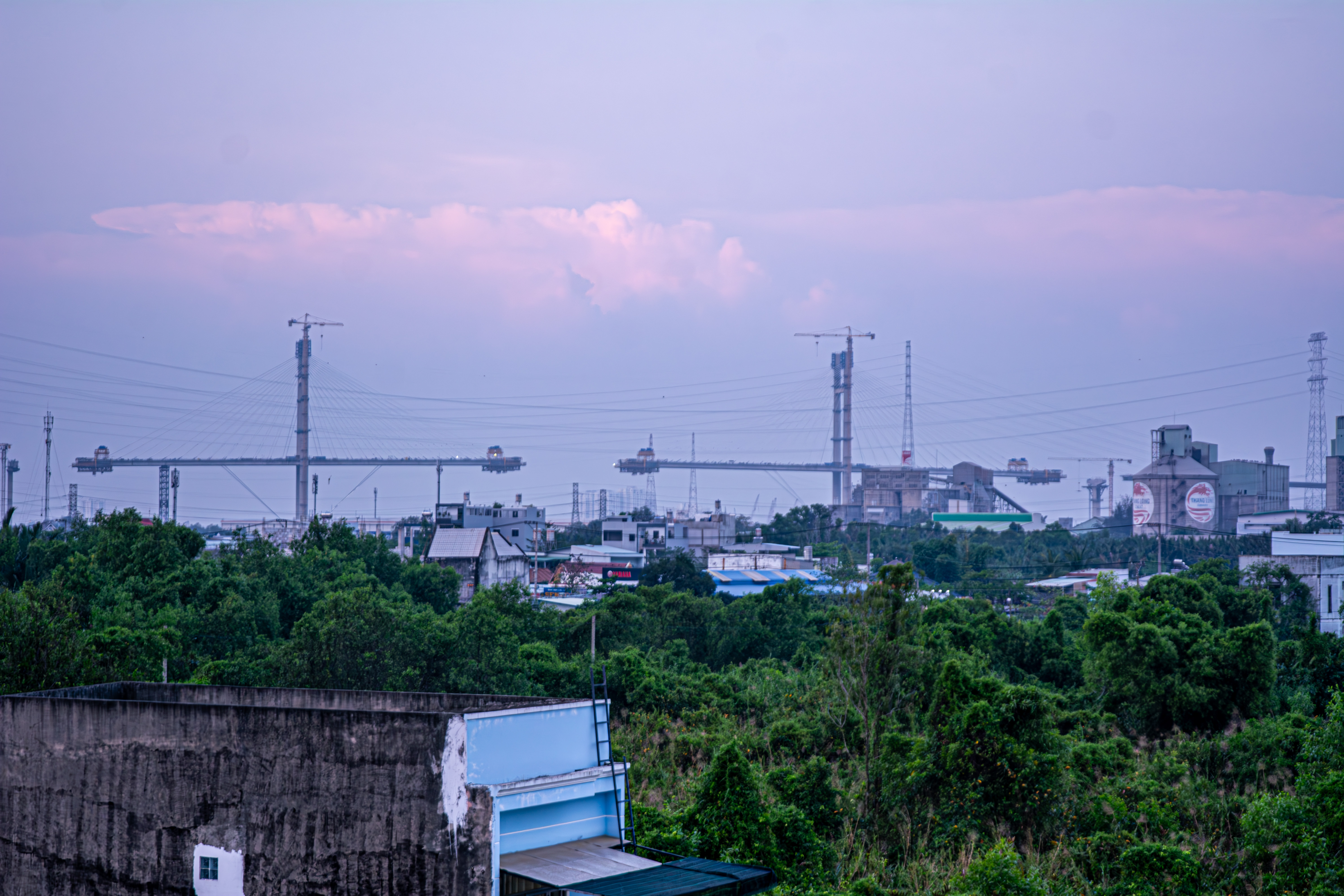
- Bình Khánh Bridge as of February 2025
- Coordinates: 10°39′35″N 106°44′20″E
- Carries: Automobiles, trucks, vans
- Crosses: Soài Rạp river
- Locale: Ben Luc – Long Thanh Expressway, Hiệp Phước and Bình Khánh, Ho Chi Minh City

Characteristics
- Design: Cable-stayed bridge
- Total length: 2,763.5 metres (9,067 ft); 12,500 metres (41,010 ft) including Phước Khánh Bridge and approach ramps
- Width: 21.75 metres (71.4 ft)
- Longest span: 375 metres (1,230 ft)
- Clearance below: 55 metres (180 ft)
- No. of lanes: 4

History
- Construction start: August 2015
- Construction end: 2025 (estimated)
- Opened: October 1, 2026; 0 days ago

Location
- Interactive map of Bình Khánh Bridge

Bình Khánh Bridge (Vietnamese: Cầu Bình Khánh) is a cable-stayed bridge spanning the Soài Rạp river between the suburban districts of Nhà Bè and Cần Giờ in southern Ho Chi Minh City, Vietnam. The bridge is part of the Ben Luc – Long Thanh Expressway, the section of North–South Expressway East bypassing the urban area of Ho Chi Minh City.

The bridge features a total length of 2,763.5 metres (9,067 ft) and a width of 21.75 metres (71.4 ft), carrying two lanes in each direction. Construction of the bridge began in August 2015 and was scheduled to complete in 2019, but was then suspended and was not resumed until 2023. Upon its completion, Bình Khánh Bridge will be one of two bridges with the highest clearance for waterway traffic in Vietnam along with the Phước Khánh Bridge spanning the Lòng Tàu River, which is also a part of the Ben Luc – Long Thanh Expressway.

As of October 1, 2026, Phước Khánh Bridge was officially opened for traffic and led to Bình Khánh Bridge with the Ben Luc – Long Thanh Expressway where both bridges are on opened.

== See also ==
- Ben Luc – Long Thanh Expressway
- Phước Khánh Bridge
- Cần Giờ Bridge
