= Nhà Bè Base =

US and Vietnamese base in Saigon, Vietnam

- Tổng kho Xăng dầu Nhà Bè
- Nhà Bè, Gia Định province
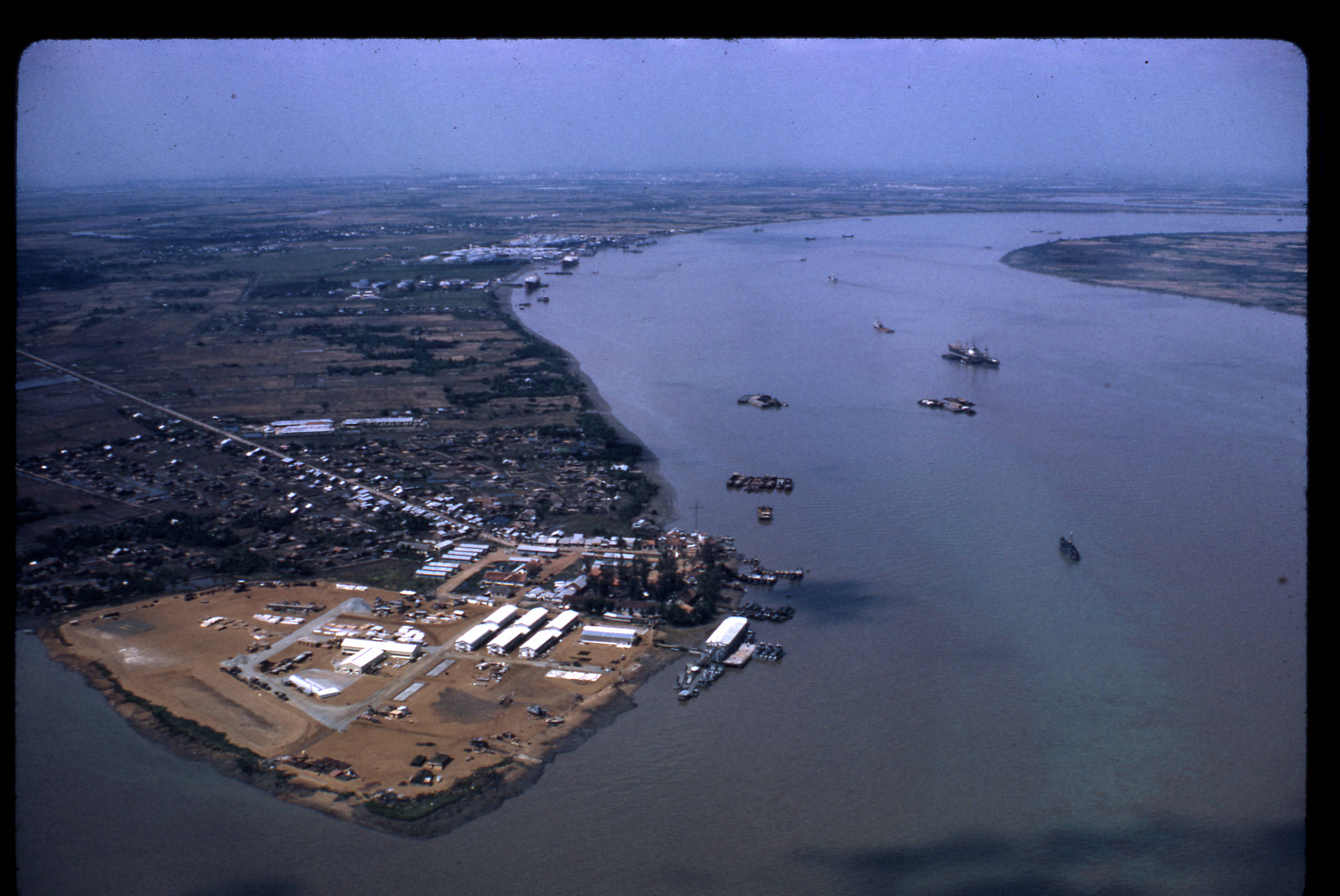
- Nhà Bè Base, 29 January 1967

Site information
- Type: Navy
- Controlled by: Vietnam Coast Guard

Location
- Location within Vietnam
- Coordinates: 10.67°N 106.767°E

Site history
- Built: 1966
- In use: 1966–present
- Battles/wars: Vietnam War

Nhà Bè Base (also known as Nhà Bè Naval Support Activity or Nhà Bè Logistics Support Base) is a former U.S. Navy and Republic of Vietnam Navy (RVNN) base in Nhà Bè District, Gia Định province, southern suburban of Saigon (now Ho Chi Minh City) of Vietnam now used as a base by the Vietnam Coast Guard.

== History ==
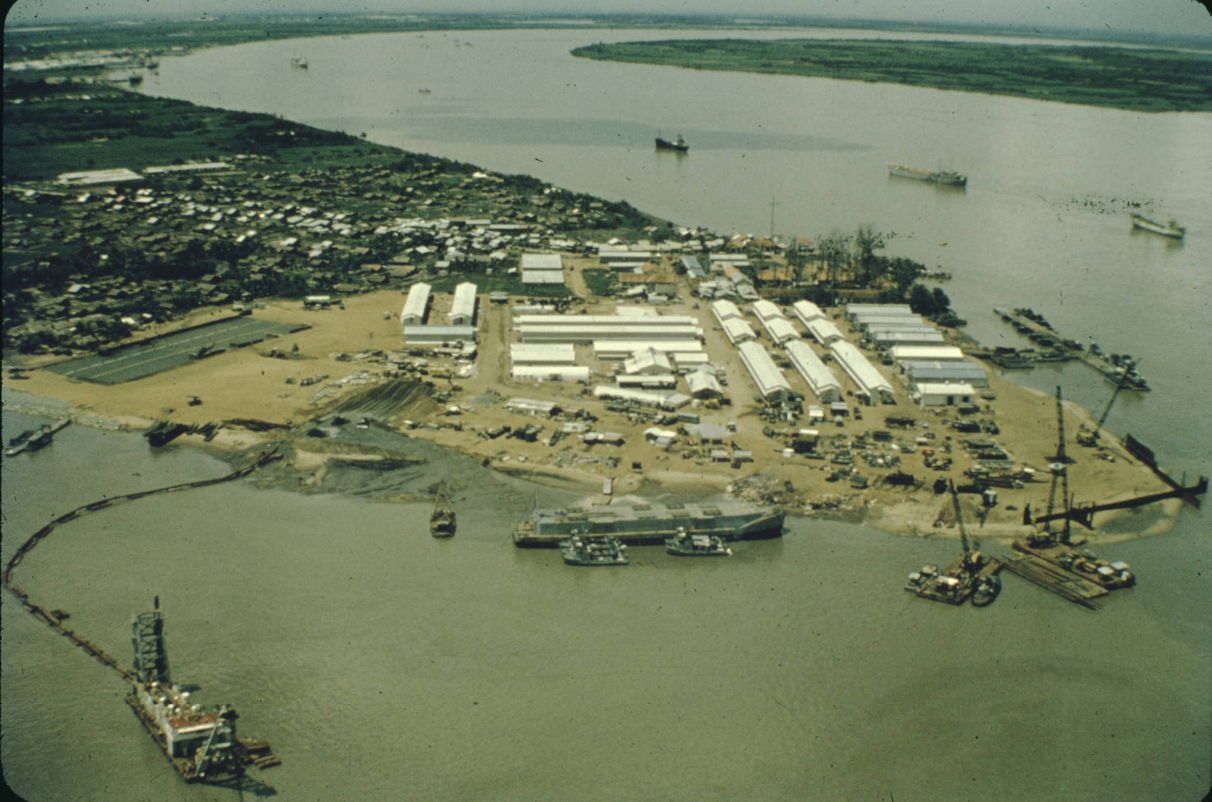
Nhà Bè, 27 September 1967

The base is located in Nhà Bè District approximately 10 miles (16 km) south southeast of Saigon at the junction of the Soài Rạp and Lòng Tàu Rivers.

The base was first established by the US Navy in May 1966 to support Operation Game Warden and particularly patrolling of the Rung Sat Special Zone. Mine Squadron 11, Detachment Alpha equipped with 12 minesweeping boats (MSBs) (57 feet (17 m) long, wooden-hulled boats) were the first Navy vessels deployed there

Construction of the base first involved the dredging of 300,000 cubic yards of sand, filling and compacting of the marshland, following which construction included barracks for 400 men, storage for 3,000 barrels of petrol, oil and lubricants (POL), a storage warehouse of 8,000 square feet, a communications and administration building, ammunition storage, two antenna towers, a mess-hall, a pier, and the required road, water, sewerage and power facilities. The overall construction period took 14 months, however the base began operation as construction was ongoing and by late 1966 Nhà Bè was also the base for three platoons from SEAL Team 1 and was also a Patrol Boat, River (PBR) base. By August 1967, a two-helicopter detachment from HA(L)-3 was located at the base.

On 2 January 1968 a Viet Cong (VC) 75mm recoilless-rifle attack against on the base wounded two sailors and scored a direct hit on an MSB which was destroyed.

In May 1968 Mine Squadron 11, Detachment Alpha became Mine Division 112. From September 1968 on six medium minesweepers (MSMs, formerly LCM(M)s) and four drone minesweepers (MSDs) of the newly created Mine Division 113 were based at Nhà Bè.

The base was transferred to the RVNN in April 1972.

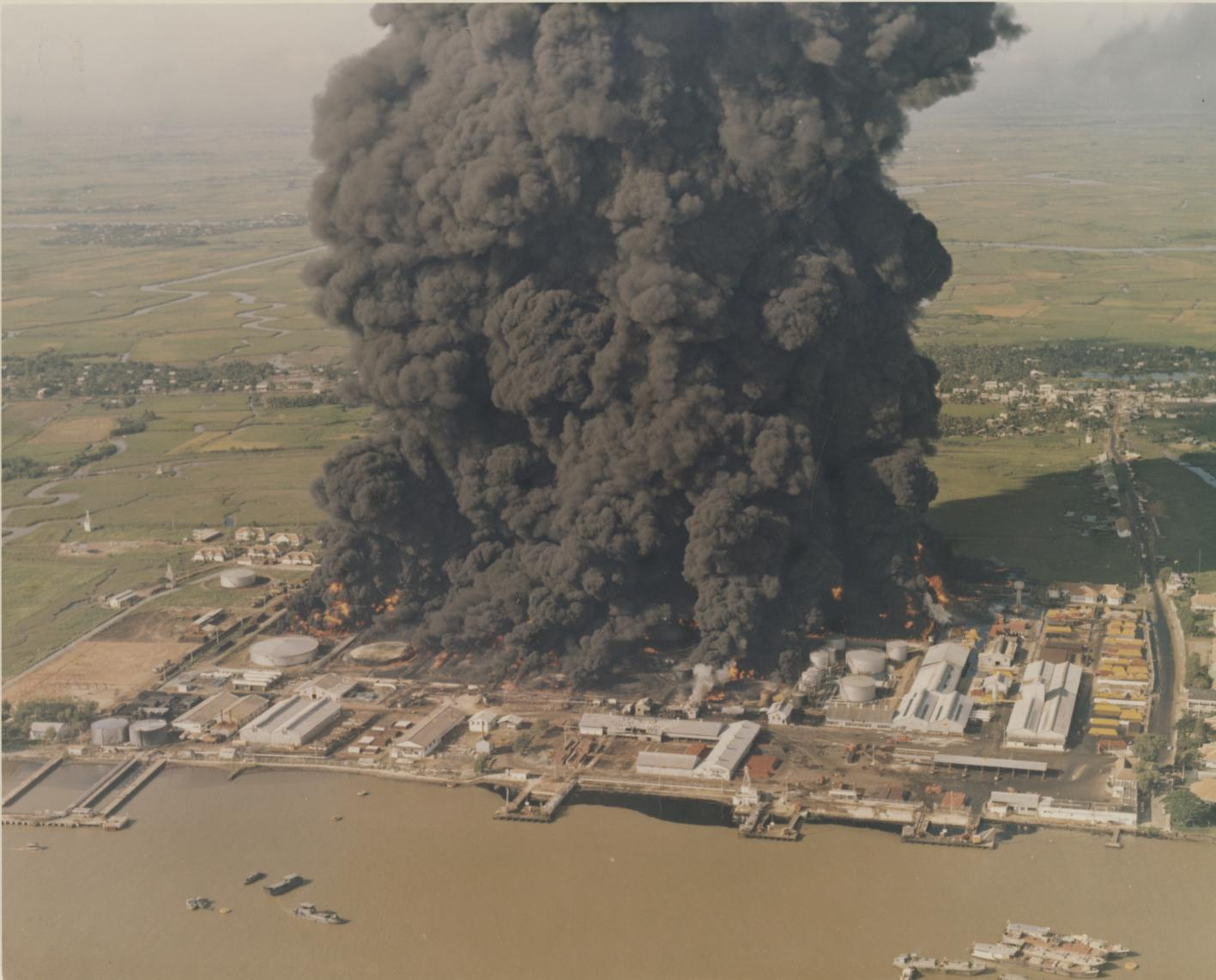
Nhà Bè fuel depot on fire, December 1973

Located on the Lòng Tàu River north of the base, the Nhà Bè fuel depot was the largest fuel storage facility in South Vietnam with approximately 80% of the nation's storage capacity. On the night of 3 December 1973 the VC hit the fuel depot with rocket fire destroying or damaging 30 fuel tanks and igniting over 600,000 barrels of fuel.

Early in 1975, the RVNN created Riverine Task Force 99 based at Nhà Bè.

The base remains in use today by the Vietnam Coast Guard.
