= Rừng Sác Road =

Road in Ho Chi Minh City, Vietnam

- Mangrove Forest Road
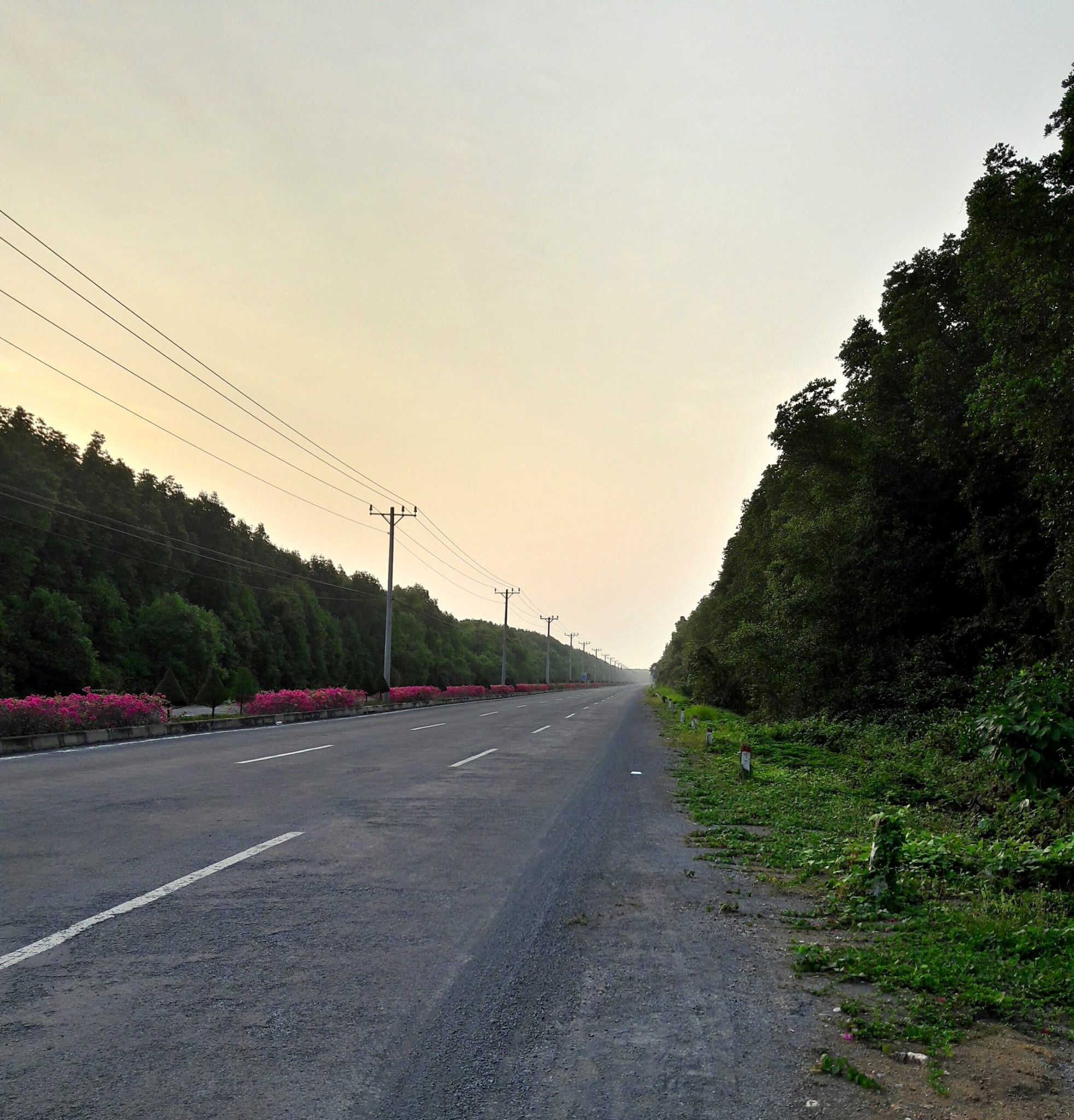
- A section of Rừng Sác Road
- Location in Ho Chi Minh City
- Maintained by: Ho Chi Minh City People's Committee
- Length: 36.5 km (22.7 mi)
- Location: Cần Giờ district, Ho Chi Minh City, Vietnam
- Coordinates: 10.50293°N 106.86528°E
- Major junctions: Nhơn Trạch intersection with Ben Luc – Long Thanh Expressway, Bình Khánh; Bà Xán intersection, Bình Khánh; Tam Thôn Hiệp, An Thới Đông and Lý Nhơn intersection, An Thới Đông; Long Hòa intersection and April 30, Cần Giờ
- North: Bình Khánh Ferry Terminal, Bình Phước Hamlet, Bình Khánh
- South: Duyên Hải Road, Long Thạnh Hamlet, Cần Giờ, Ho Chi Minh City

Construction
- Commissioned: January 26, 2010
- Construction start: March 2002
- Inauguration: January 22, 2011

Rừng Sác Road (Vietnamese: Đường Rừng Sác, lit. 'Mangrove Forest Road') is a main road run through, Bình Khánh, An Thới Đông and Cần Giờ, Ho Chi Minh City, Vietnam. The road begins at the Bình Khánh ferry terminal on the Cần Giờ side, runs along a northwest-southeast axis through residential areas, aquaculture zones, and Cần Giờ Mangrove Forest, and terminates at the intersection leading to the April 30 beach tourist area.

== Building ==
Construction of the original Rung Sac Road began in April 1985 across a landscape of marshy terrain and a dense network of rivers and canals. The old road featured only two lanes, crossed seven small bridges, and required the use of two ferry crossings. In May 2002, the Ho Chi Minh City People's Committee approved a project to upgrade Rung Sac Road, initiating a pilot upgrade to the new Rung Sac Road along a section spanning only 1 km from he former Hào Võ river area to Hà Thanh Bridge. In November 2004, the city administration increased the investment capital for Phase 1, and in June 2007, it decided to expand the roadway to six lanes; however, the bridges along the route were initially designed with a single structure accommodating two traffic lanes.

It took nine years to complete Rừng Sác Road, from the start of construction to its inauguration in February 2011. It has a length of 36,5 km, width of 30 m with six lanes, comprising two construction phases for three road segments.

- From Bình Khánh ferry terminal to Nhơn Trạch intersection section (later known as Rừng Sác intersection, intersects with Ben Luc – Long Thanh Expressway): Phase 1 comprises four lanes with a width of 23.5–30 meters; Phase 2 expands it to six lanes with a width of 30 meters.
- From Nhơn Trạch intersection to Long Hòa Y-intersection (intersects with Duyên Hải Road): Phase 1 comprises six lanes with a width of 30.5 meters; Phase 2 increases the width to 31.24 meters.
- The section from Long Hoòa intersection to April 30 intersection (the junction with the road leading to the April 30 beach tourist area and the Thạnh Thới road leading to Hòa Hiệp hamlet, Cần Giờ commune): Phase 1 comprises four lanes with a width of 23.5 meters; Phase 2 expands the width to 40 meters.

Some sections have a road reservation width of up to 120 meters, such as the stretch from Nhơn Trạch Intersection to Dần Xây Bridge (excluding An Nghĩa Bridge). Other sections have a width of 60 meters, such as the stretch from Dần Xây Bridge to Long Hòa Y-junction (excluding Hà Thanh Bridge).

Rừng Sác Road was inaugurated on January 26, 2010 (excluding the unfinished An Nghĩa Bridge then), and the road was officially inaugurated on January 22, 2011. The total investment for the entire route was 1,420 billion VND, with over 500 billion VND allocated for bridge construction.

=== Bridges ===
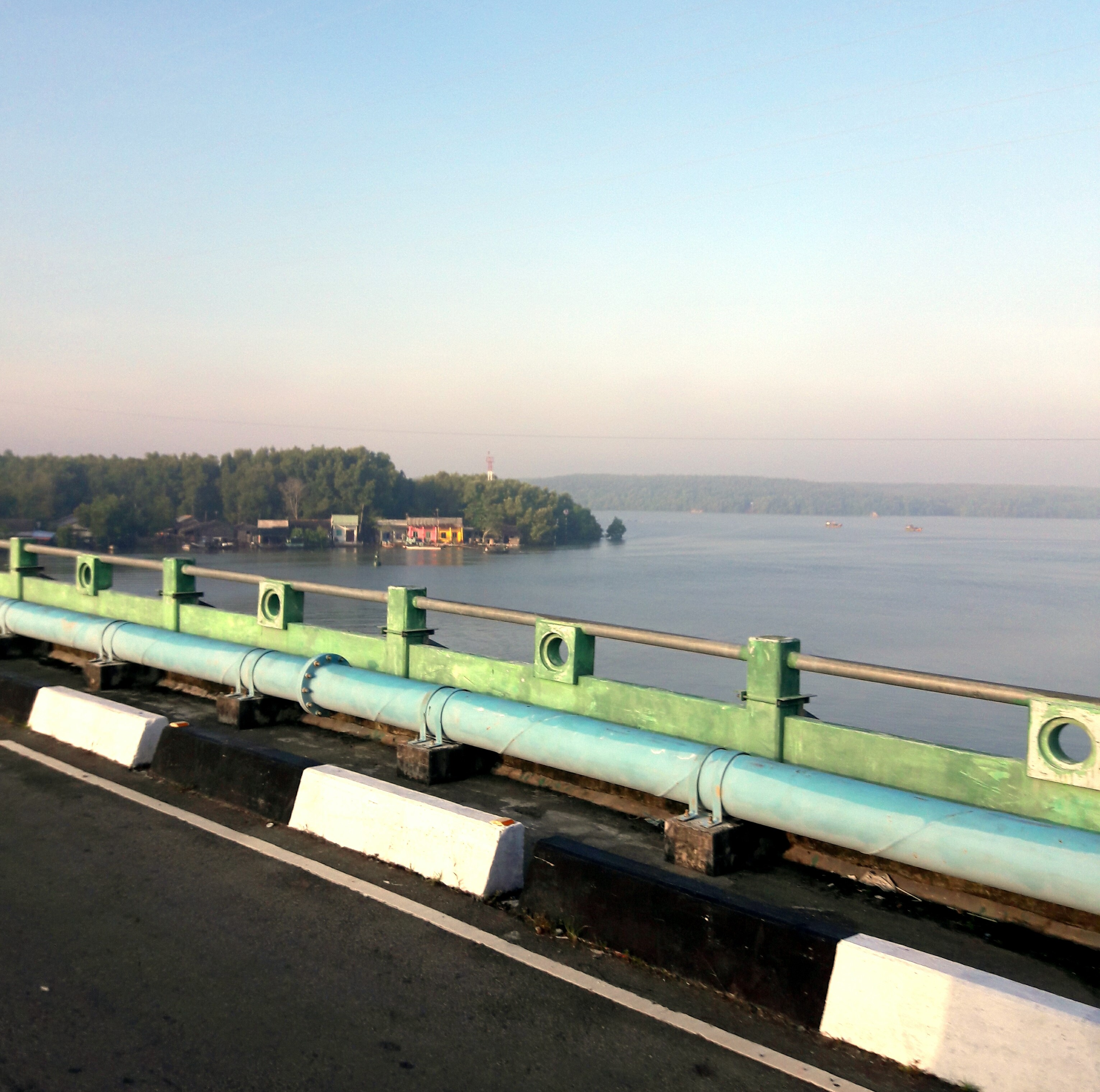
View from An Nghĩa Bridge

There are eight bridges along the entire Rung Sac route, listed in order from north to south as follows:

No.	Name	Km	Commune
1	Rạch Lá	9	Bình Khánh - An Thới Đông
2	An Nghĩa	11+200	An Thới Đông
3	Nông Trường Quận 5	11+847	An Thới Đông
4	Rạch Đôn	13+100	An Thới Đông
5	Lôi Giang	16	An Thới Đông
6	Long Giang Xây	21+400	An Thới Đông
7	Dần Xây	22+500	An Thới Đông - Cần Giờ
8	Hà Thanh	35+100	Cần Giờ

Seven new bridges with a 30-ton load capacity were built to replace older ones; the Dần Xây Bridge, in particular, was completed earlier, in 2001. Construction of this bridge took three years—following multiple extensions—and resulted in a structure 381 meters long and 12 meters wide with a 30-ton load capacity, replacing the former Dần Xây ferry. The place name "Dần Xây" originates from the name of the *giằng xây* plant; according to the Đại Nam quốc âm tự vị (Dictionary of the National Language of Đại Nam) book of Huỳnh Tịnh Của the plant bears fruit "resembling a millstone" and possesses flowers and leaves used—when decocted with rock sugar—as a remedy for coughs caused by the wind ("giống cái thớt cối xay", "bông lá dùng làm thuốc ho gió, sắc với đường phèn").

An Nghĩa Bridge was the final new bridge completed on the Rừng Sác Road; spanning 386.8 meters in length and 13.2 meters in width with a navigational clearance of 6 meters, the project took nine months to build at a cost of 179.1 billion VND and was inaugurated on June 28, 2010.

== Road system ==
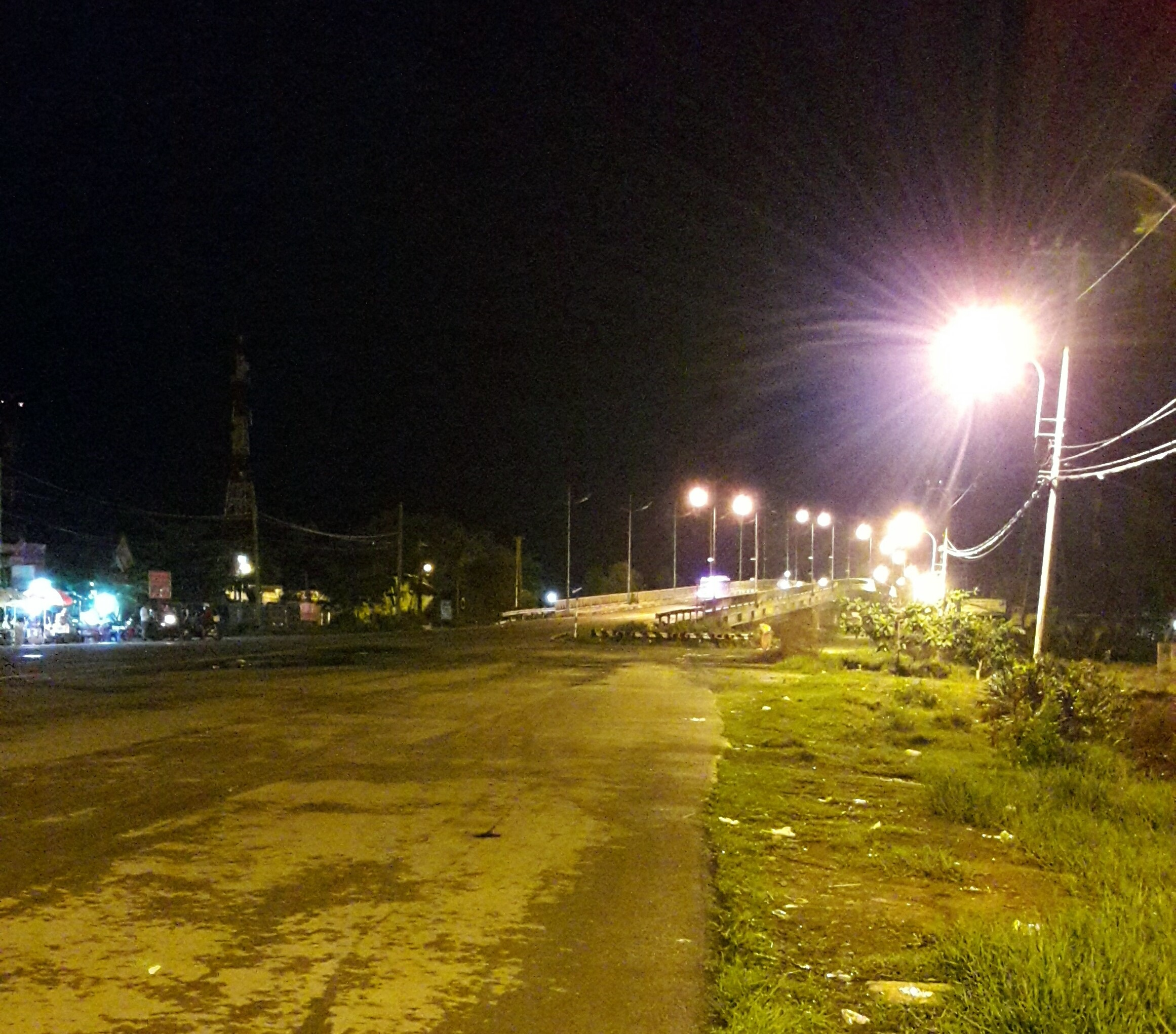
A section of Rừng Sác Road near An Nghia Bridge at night.

Rừng Sác Road runs though three communes of Bình Khánh, An Thới Đông và Cần Giờ. The headquarters of the Bình Khánh and Cần Giờ Commune People's Committees are both located along the main road. From Rừng Sác Road, access roads lead into the residential areas situated deeper within each commune. Traveling south from the north, you reach the Tam Thôn Hiệp T-junction near An Nghĩa Bridge; turning onto Tam Thôn Hiệp Road leads to Bình Khánh Commune. Continuing on to the An Thới Đông T-junction and turning onto An Thới Đông Road takes you to the populated areas of An Thới Đông Commune. Further along, at the Ly Nhon T-junction, follow Lý Nhiwn Road (about 20 km) goes over Doi Lầu hamlet, An Thới Đông commune and then goes to the commune center. Continuing to Long Hòa intersection, then turn right, to go into Cần Giờ commune.

Rừng Sác Road runs through residential areas, aquaculture zones, and—predominantly—mangrove forests. Along the way, travelers can access eco-tourism sites, such as Vàm Sát, Dần Xây and Monkey Island Tourist Area – Rừng Sác Base. Upon reaching the April 30 intersection, visitors can turn into the April 30 Tourist Area to enjoy the beach or purchase seafood at Hàng Dương Market. Alternatively, continuing straight along Duyên Hải Road past the intersection leads to Cần Giờ commune, the former administrative center of the old Cần Giờ district.

== Public transit access ==
Currently, there are two bus routes that run along Rừng Sác Road:

Line	Origin - Destination			Distance (km)	Time (min)	Headway (min)
90	Bình Khánh Ferry (Bình Khánh Ferry Terminal Lot, Bình Khánh)	↔	Cần Thạnh (Cần Thạnh Bus Terminus, Đào Cử Street, Cần Giờ)	45,6	80	8 – 15
75	Sài Gòn (September 23rd Park, Bến Thành)	↔	Cần Giờ (Cần Thạnh Bus Terminus, Đào Cử Street, Cần Giờ)	63	140	–

The Ben Thanh–Can Gio metro, connect Ben Thanh station with Cần Giờ Beach is planned to run along the road, causing controversies for taking 4.5 hectares of Mangrove Forest on both side of the road to build the line.
