= Cần Giờ Bridge =

Cable-stayed overpass in southern Vietnam

Cần Giờ Bridge Cầu Cần Giờ
- Carries: All vehicles
- Crosses: Soài Rạp
- Locale: Ho Chi Minh City, Vietnam
- Begins: Road 15B, Nhà Bè
- Ends: Rừng Sác Road, Bình Khánh

Characteristics
- Design: Cable-stayed bridge
- Longest span: ~3,400 metres (11,155 ft)
- Clearance above: 55 metres (180 ft)

History
- Construction start: ~2022

Can Gio Bridge (Vietnamese: Cầu Cần Giờ), is a planned cable-stayed bridge to cross over Soài Rạp, a tributary of the Nhà Bè River in Ho Chi Minh City, Vietnam.

== Description ==
=== Planning and Design ===
In order to drive between the Nhà Bè district and Cần Giờ district in Ho Chi Minh City, motorists currently have to go through the Bình Khánh Ferry Terminal, which has been receiving increasing amounts of traffic and subsequent delays. Trips across the Soài Rạp river could take from fifteen to forty five minutes to cross a 1.2 kilometer span.

Since 2007, there were discussions on replacing the Binh Khanh ferrys with a road cable-stayed bridge that would span the Soai Rap river. In 2019, a design was chosen for a three kilometer, four-lane, cable-stayed bridge. One of the bridge's pillars would be shaped similarly to mangrove trees as a reference to the Cần Giờ Mangrove Forest and with the bridge's railing to appear as waves to invoke Cần Giờ's seaside.

=== Construction ===
It was announced to be built under a "Build-Transfer" model, with a budget of 5.3 billion VND, and construction scheduled to begin in 2020. By 2020, the build-transfer model was reconsidered and a restructuring pushed the projected start date for construction to 2022. The location of the bridge was announced to start at the intersection between Road 15B and Street No. 2 in Nhà Bè District’s Phú Xuân urban area and connect with Rừng Sác Road, 1.8 kilometers south of the Bình Khánh ferry terminal in the Bình Khánh commune of Cần Giờ district.

Other projects have been presented as contingent on the completion of the bridge, especially Cần Giờ's coastal tourism site project. The "Cần Giờ Tourism Urban Area", which is now known as Vinhomes Green Paradise of Vingroup, is a 2,870 hectare reclaimed land seaside development initiative that would connect in from the bridge. By January 2021, concerns were growing about the effects of the project's delays on investment and economic development in the region. In April, officials announced that the bridge would be a higher priority and committed 10 billion VND to the project's completion.
