= Phước Khánh Bridge =

Phước Khánh Bridge Cầu Phước Khánh
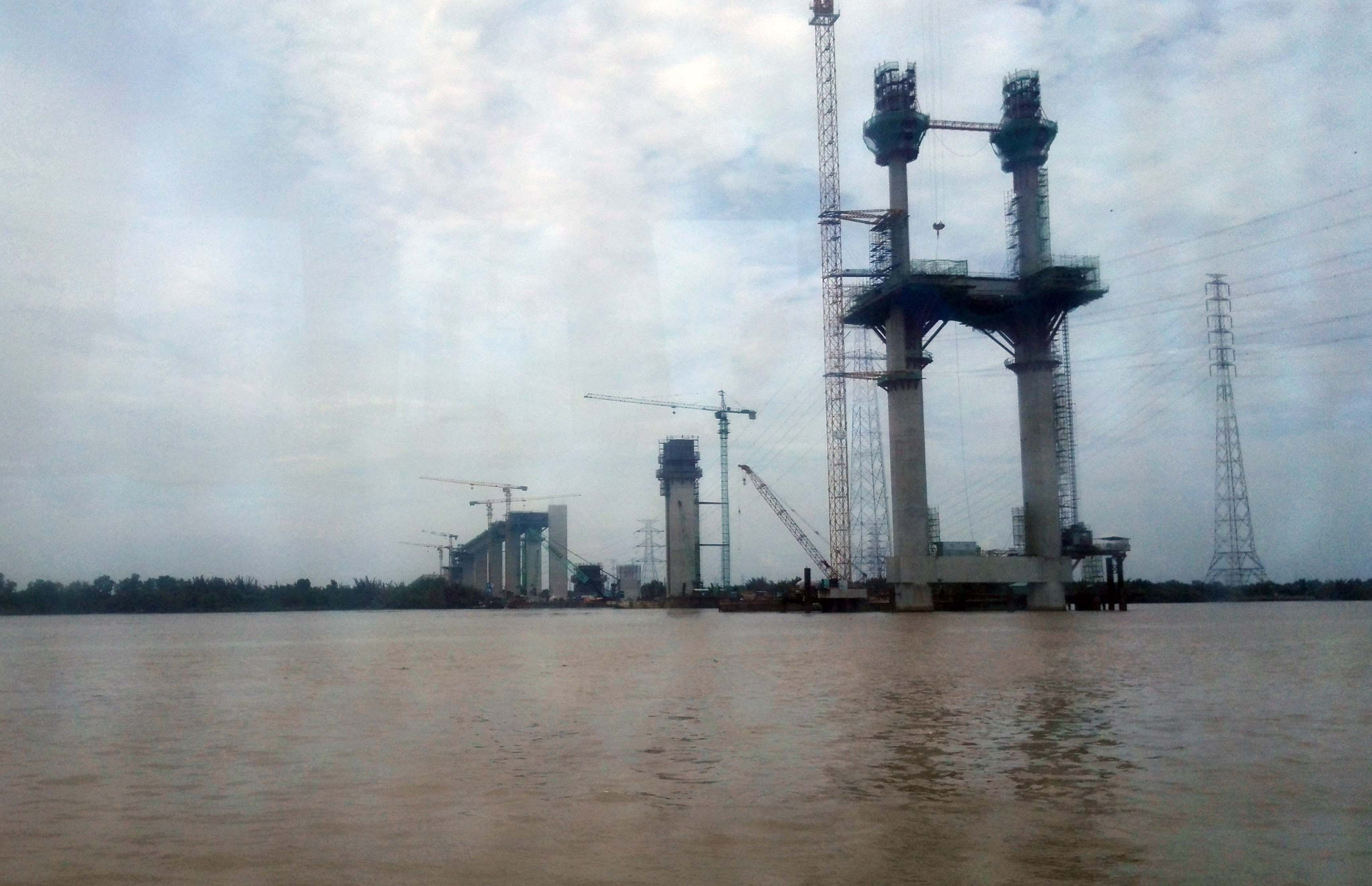
- Phuoc Khanh Bridge in 2017
- Coordinates: 10.663°N 106.795°E
- Carries: Automobiles, trucks, vans
- Crosses: Lòng Tàu River
- Locale: Ben Luc – Long Thanh Expressway, Bình Khánh, Ho Chi Minh City and Đại Phước (Nhơn Trạch District), Đồng Nai, Vietnam

Characteristics
- Design: Cable-stayed bridge
- Total length: 3,186 metres (10,453 ft); 12,500 metres (41,010 ft) including Bình Khánh Bridge and approach ramps
- Width: 21.75 metres (71 ft)
- Height: 135 metres (443 ft)
- Longest span: 300 metres (984 ft)
- Clearance above: 55 metres (180 ft)

History
- Construction start: July 18, 2015
- Opened: October 1, 2026; 0 days ago

Location
- Interactive map of Phước Khánh Bridge

Phuoc Khanh Bridge (Vietnamese: Cầu Phước Khánh), is a bridge aims to cross over the Lòng Tàu River, a distributary of Nhà Bè River, which is the confluence of Saigon River and Đồng Nai River in Vietnam.

== Description ==
=== Planning and Design ===
Phuoc Khanh Bridge is being constructed as a cable-stayed road bridge and would be the third bridge of the Ben Luc – Long Thanh Expressway project, itself part of the larger North–South Expressway East and Ring Road 3 of Ho Chi Minh City. Phuoc Khanh Bridge would cross the Lòng Tàu River, connecting Cần Giờ District with the Nhơn Trạch District, Dong Nai province. It would also serve as a link to the Bien Hoa–Vung Tau Expressway which would ultimately provide a Southeast Asian beltway (via AH1 and AH17) that would go through Bangkok, Phnom Penh, Ho Chi Minh City, and Vung Tau together.

The bridge is designed to be 3,186 metres (10,453 ft) long and 21.75 metres (71 ft) wide. When completed, Phuoc Khanh Bridge and Binh Khanh Bridge would be the two bridges with the highest clearance for boat traffic in Vietnam (55 meters). It plans to allow for four lanes of traffic at an 80 kph speed limit. The initial investment capital was US$162.3 million with an opening initially slated for 2019.

=== Construction ===
The groundbreaking ceremony took place on July 18, 2015, with the presence and support of the Japan International Cooperation Agency. By 2018, the bridge was off schedule, with a 4.7 kilometer road that was meant to connect Phuoc Khanh and Binh Khanh bridges finished before the bridges themselves. Financing issues were cited as causing delays for the bridge and the overall Ben Luc-Long Thanh expressway project in Vietnam. After construction was halted in October 2019 on the Binh Khanh Bridge, officials sent inspectors in attempt to remove the financial and logistical obstacles delaying the Phuoc Khanh project.

On February 21, 2021, an 8,000 ton container ship Phuc Khanh (Phúc Khánh) had its engine stalled while in the Long Tau River and drifted freely until crashing into a crane on the construction site of the Phuoc Khanh bridge project. This incident caused four containers to fall off the ship, and the collapse of construction-related scaffolding along the crane.

As of October 1, 2026, Phước Khánh Bridge was officially opened for traffic and led to Bình Khánh Bridge with the Ben Luc – Long Thanh Expressway where both bridges are on opened.

== See also ==
- Ben Luc – Long Thanh Expressway
- Bình Khánh Bridge
