= Nhà Bè =

Nhà Bè Xã Nhà Bè Phú Xuân, Phước Long Đông, Long Kiểng, Phước Lộc
- Commune
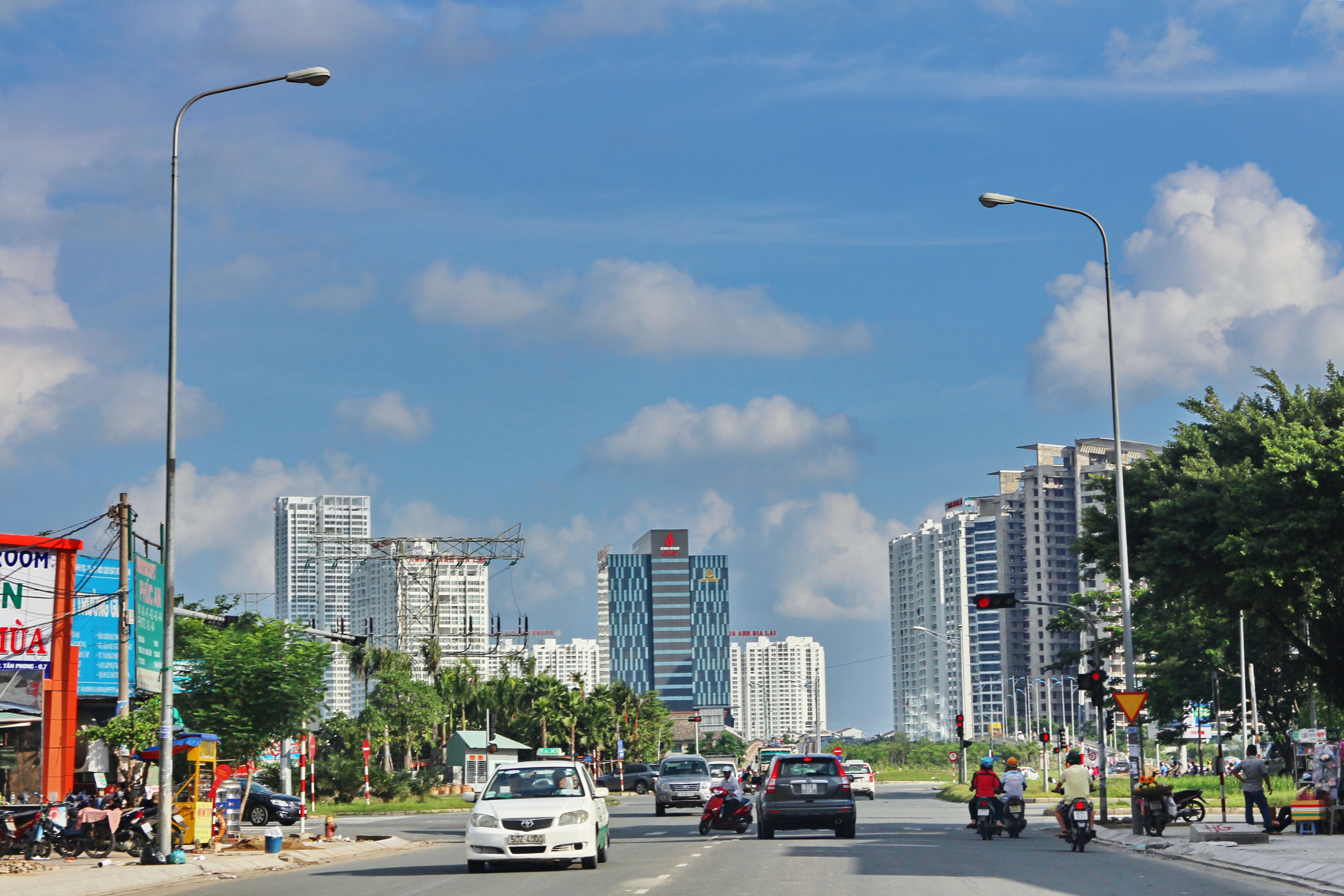
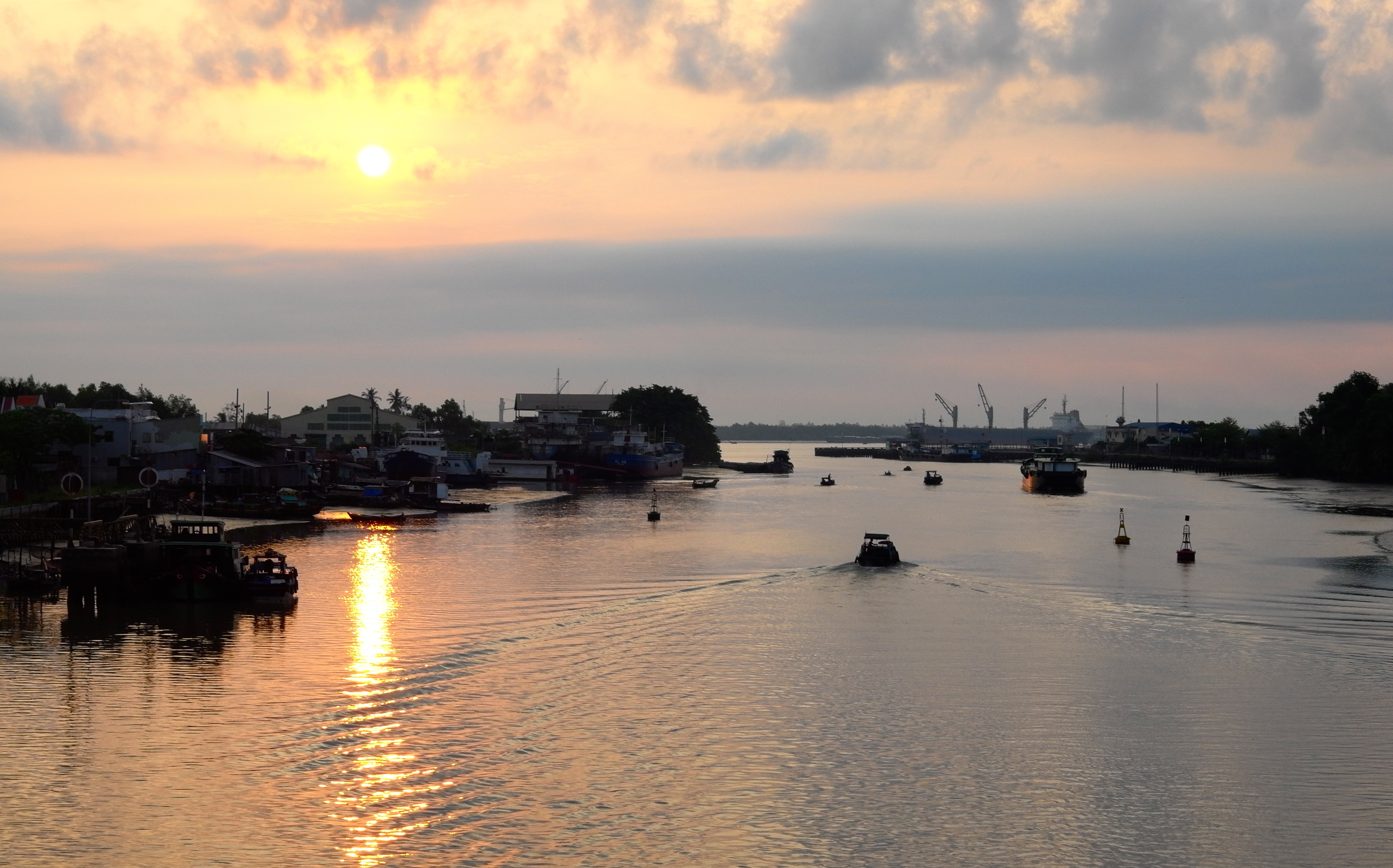
- Cluster of high-rise buildings on Nguyễn Hữu Thọ Road, Phước Kiểng area (Top) and dawn view at Phú Xuân 2 Bridge, former town of Nhà Bè
- Interactive map of Nhà Bè
- Coordinates: 10°41′41″N 106°44′26″E
- Country: Vietnam
- Municipality: Ho Chi Minh City
- Established: June 16, 2025

Area
  - Total: 14.32 sq mi (37.10 km^{2})

Population (2024)
  - Total: 125,832
  - Density: 8,784/sq mi (3,392/km^{2})
- Time zone: UTC+07:00 (Indochina Time)
- Administrative code: 27655

Nhà Bè (Vietnamese: Xã Nhà Bè) is a commune of Ho Chi Minh City, Vietnam. It is one of the 168 new wards, communes and special zones of the city following the reorganization in 2025.

== Etymology ==
The name "Nhà Bè" originates from floating houses or depots (nhà bè) built on the river in the area during the 17th century. According to legend, Võ Thủ Hoằng (also known as Thủ Huồng or Thủ Hoằng), a wealthy moneylender, had a dream in which he saw his name listed among sinners in the underworld. Upon awakening, he repented and used his wealth for charity. He constructed a large floating house at the confluence of rivers, providing free food, water, and shelter for travelers and boaters. This act inspired others to build similar structures, leading to the formation of a floating market and the area's name.

The area is mentioned in the folk verse: "Nhà Bè nước chảy chia hai / Ai về Gia Định, Đồng Nai thì về" ("Nhà Bè where the water flows in two directions / Whoever goes to Gia Định or Đồng Nai, go this way") as the Nhà Bè River is where the Saigon River (Gia Định) and Đồng Nai River at the Red Light Cape (Mũi Đèn Đỏ) near the Phú Mỹ Bridge. In the spring of 1698, Lord Nguyễn Hữu Cảnh, sent by the Nguyễn lords to expand southward, established administrative units in the region. He designated the Nhà Bè floating market as a central trading hub, connecting it to areas like Cù Lao Phố (means the City Isle; Hiệp Hòa, Biên Hòa, Đồng Nai), Bến Nghé, Cần Giờ, Rạch Cát, Vũng Cù (Tân An), and Gò Vấp.

== History ==
During the early 20th century, under French colonial administration, Nhà Bè became one of four districts in Gia Định Province. It played a significant role as a strategic base during the resistance wars against French and American forces. The modern administrative unit traces its roots to 17 July 1986, when the town of Nhà Bè was formed from parts of Phú Mỹ and Phú Xuân communes. In 1997, portions of it were transferred to the newly established Phú Mỹ ward, District 7, and the district seat moved to Phú Xuân; however, Phú Xuân still stay in its commune status and Nhà Bè is still the only town of the district then.

On June 16, 2025, the National Assembly Standing Committee issued Resolution No. 1685/NQ-UBTVQH15 on the arrangement of commune-level administrative units of Ho Chi Minh City in 2025 (effective from June 16, 2025). Accordingly, the entire land area and population of Nhà Bè township and Phú Xuân, Phước Kiển, Phước Lộc communes of the former Nhà Bè district will be integrated into a new commune named Nhà Bè (Clause 134, Article 1).

== Geography ==
Nhà Bè is located in southern Ho Chi Minh City, approximately 15 km south of the city center. It lies at the confluence of several rivers and creeks, including the Nhà Bè River and other creeks such as Rạch Đỉa, Long Kiểng, Rạch Tôm, Cây Bông, Cây Khô, Rạch Đôi, Rạch Tắc, Thầy Cai... The area is surrounded by waterways from the Sài Gòn, Đồng Nai, Nhà Bè, Lòng Tàu, and Soài Rạp rivers, providing strategic advantages for trade and transportation.

Nhà Bè commune is bordered by:

- Tân Hưng, Tân Mỹ và Phú Thuận wards to the north by Rạch Đỉa creek, from west to east respectively
- Đại Phước commune of Đồng Nai province to the east by Nhà Bè River
- Bình Khánh commune to the south by Nhà Bè River
- Hiệp Phước commune to the southwest mostly by Cây Khô and Mương Chuối creeks
- Bình Hưng commune to the west by Gò Nổi creek.

== Economy ==
The commune has developed into an urban area with deep-water ports (Nhà Bè Base), industrial zones, and river tourism. Former marshlands have been transformed into highways, high-rise buildings, parks, and villas. It benefits from connections via bridges, expressways, and ring roads, facilitating cargo handling and urban expansion.
