= Phú Thuận, Ho Chi Minh City =

Phú Thuận Phường Phú Thuận
- Ward
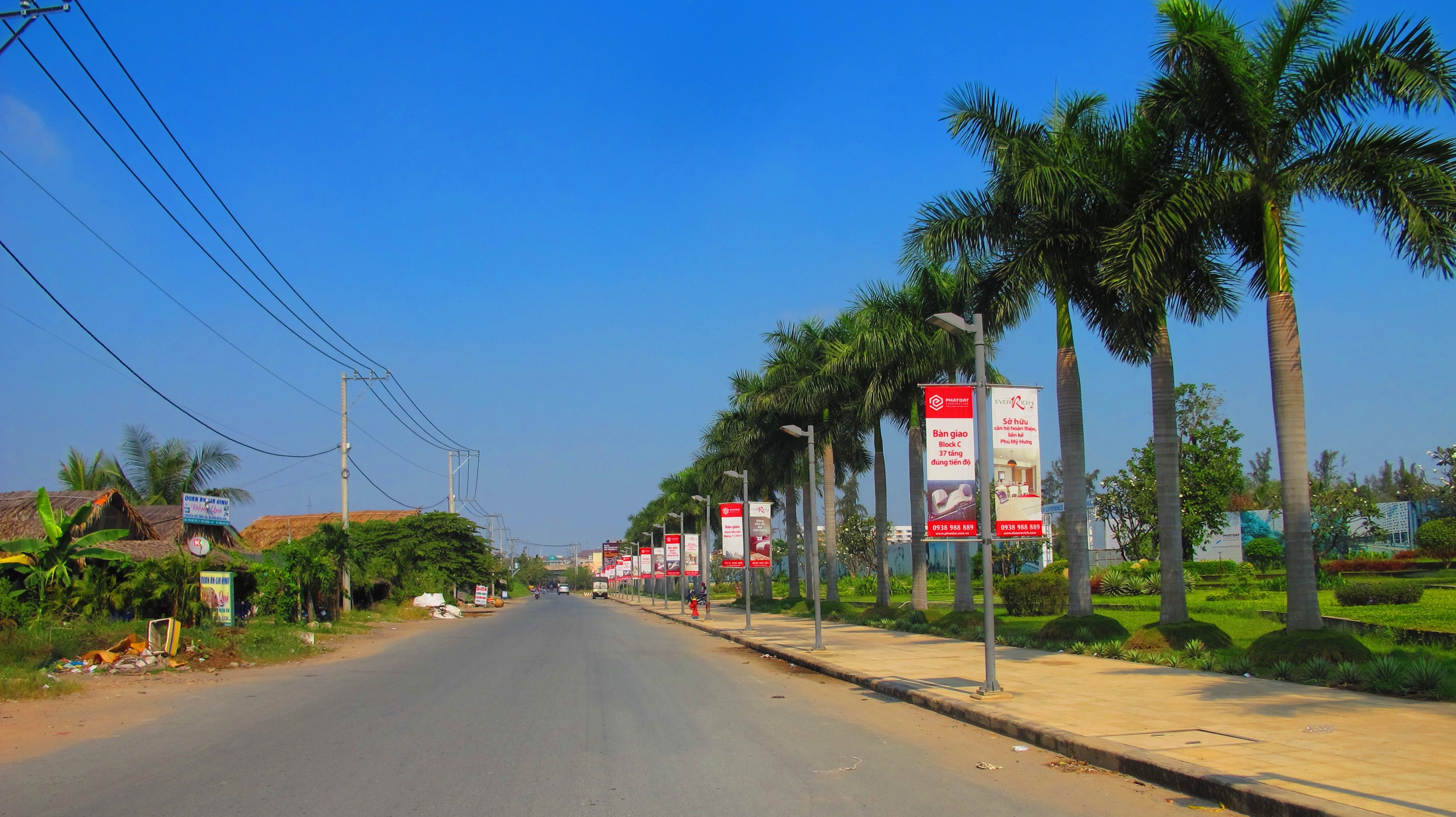
- Interactive map of Phú Thuận
- Coordinates: 10°43′29″N 106°44′28″E
- Country: Vietnam
- Municipality: Ho Chi Minh City
- Established: June 16, 2025

Area
  - Total: 4.07 sq mi (10.55 km^{2})

Population (2024)
  - Total: 84,089
  - Density: 20,640/sq mi (7,971/km^{2})
- Time zone: UTC+07:00 (Indochina Time)
- Administrative code: 27484

Phú Thuận (Vietnamese: Phường Phú Thuận) is a ward of Ho Chi Minh City, Vietnam. It is one of the 168 new wards, communes and special zones of the city following the reorganization in 2025.

== Geography ==
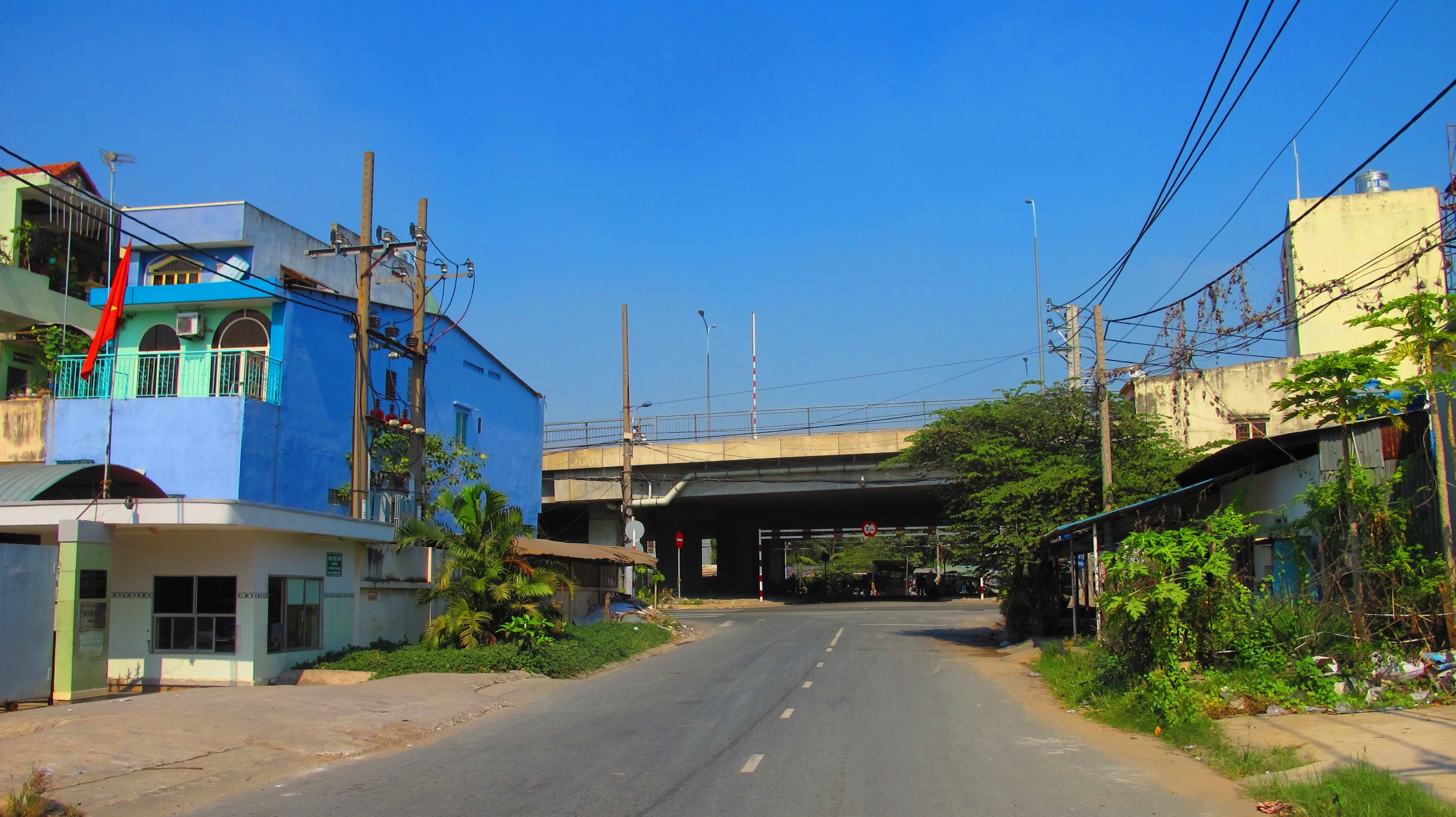
Down under Phú Mỹ Bridge Overpass seen from Đào Trí Street, borderline of Phú Thuận and Tân Thuận wards

Phú Thuận is located in the urban core of Ho Chi Minh City, km to the south of Saigon, it has the following geographical location:

- To the north, it borders Tân Thuận by Nguyễn Văn Quỳ Road
- To the northeast, it borders to Cát Lái by Saigon River
- To the east, it borders Đại Phước (Nhơn Trạch district), Đồng Nai province by Nhà Bè River
- To the south, it borders Nhà Bè by Phú Xuân River
- To the west, it borders Tân Mỹ and Bình Hưng by Huỳnh Tấn Phát road.

According to Official Dispatch No. 2896/BNV-CQĐP dated May 27, 2025 of the Ministry of Home Affairs, following the merger, Tân Hưng has a land area of 10.55 km², the population as of December 31, 2024 is 84,089 people, the population density is 20,640 people/km².

== History ==
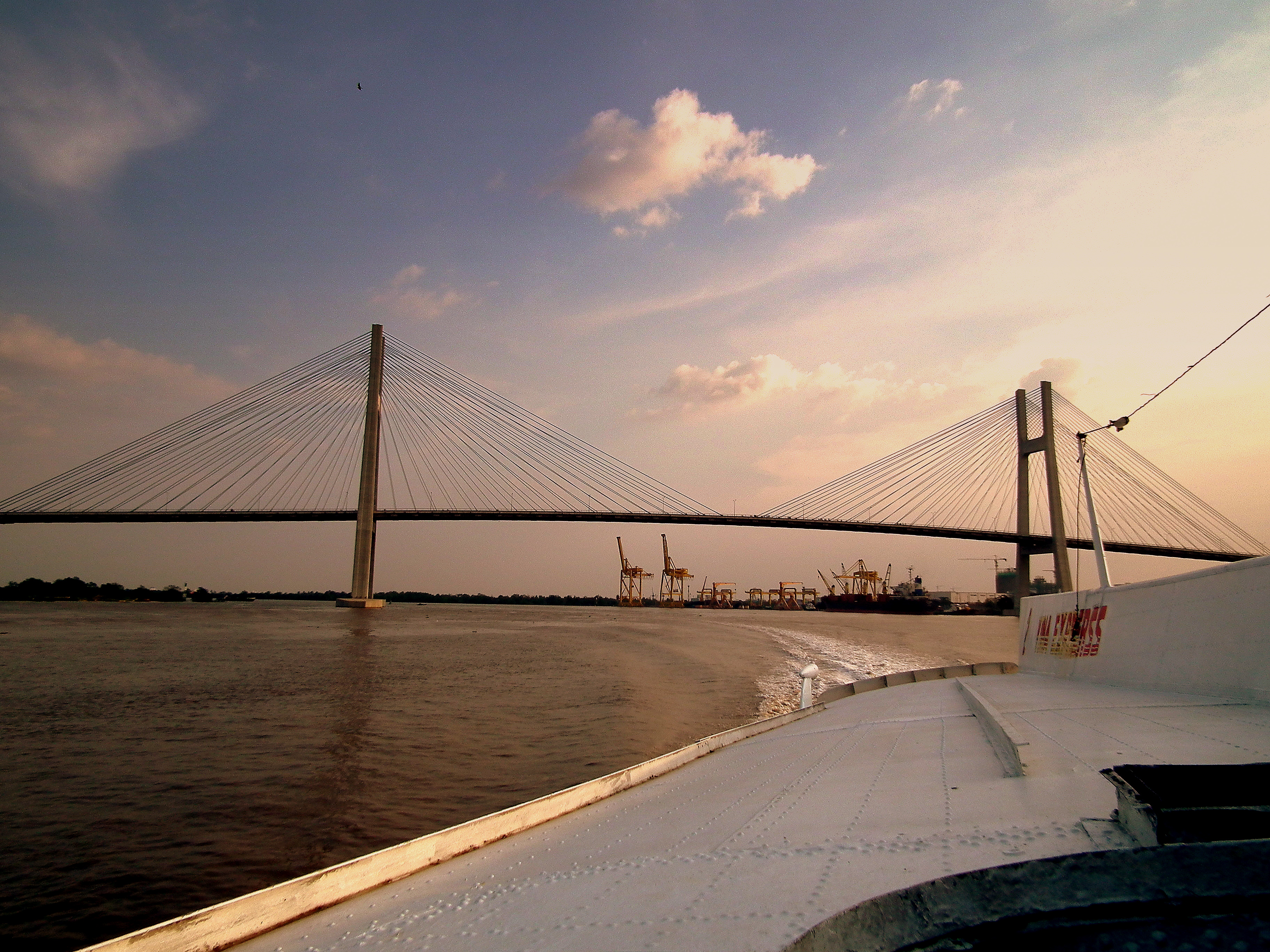
Ports in Phú Thuận, nearby the Phú Mỹ Bridge

On June 16, 2025, the National Assembly Standing Committee issued Resolution No. 1685/NQ-UBTVQH15 on the arrangement of commune-level administrative units of Ho Chi Minh City in 2025 (effective from June 16, 2025). Accordingly, the entire land area and population of Phú Thuận ward and part of Phú Mỹ ward of the former District 7 will be integrated into a new ward named Phú Thuận (Clause 19, Article 1).

== Economy ==
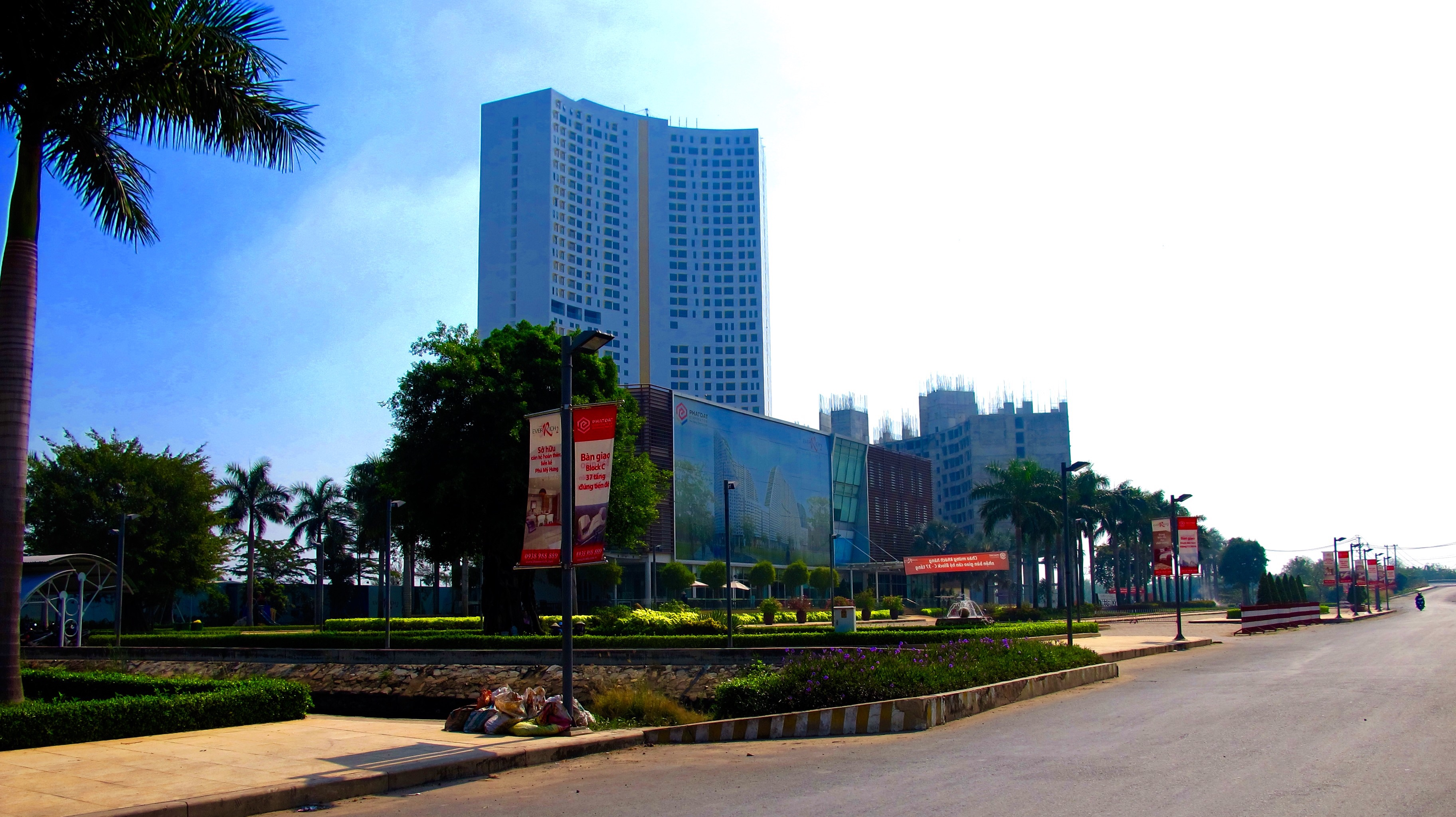
Buildings on Đào Trí Road

Logistics plays a significant role in the economy of Phú Thuận ward, thanks to its location bordering the Nhà Bè River, the confluence of the Saigon and Đồng Nai rivers before they flow into the South China Sea at Cần Giờ. The riverside area has seen the construction of several ports, shipyards, and warehouses.

The Đào Trí Road along the Nhà Bè river leading to the ports is also gradually being lined with high-rise luxury apartment buildings, earning it the nickname "the billion-dollar road."
