= List of districtual name etymologies of Ho Chi Minh City =

Ho Chi Minh City has 21 urban and rural districts and 1 municipal city. Among them, 10 are numbered and 12 are named. This article lists the etymologies of the names of districts and municipal city in Ho Chi Minh City.

== Municipal city ==
Name	Language of origin	Literal translation	Meaning and notes
Thủ Đức	Sino-Vietnamese	Đức the Guard	Named after the title of Tạ Dương Minh, a settler in the Nguyen dynasty and the founder of a market of his name. The first time the name was used to refer to the land was on October 9, 1868.

== Urban districts ==
Name	Language of origin	Literal translation	Meaning and notes
Bình Tân	Sino-Vietnamese	Peaceful New	Named after Bình Hưng Hòa, (Note: Peaceful, Flourishing and Harmonious) Bình Trị Đông (Note: Peacefully Governed in the East) and Tân Tạo, (Note: Newly Created) the three communes formerly in Bình Chánh District, from which Bình Tân District was formed in 2003. The old Bình Tân District that existed from 1956 to 1972 was merged from and named after Tân Bình and northern Bình Chánh.
Bình Thạnh	Sino-Vietnamese	Peaceful and Prosperous	Named after the two former districts of Bình Hòa (Note: Peaceful and Harmonious) and Thạnh Mỹ Tây, (Note: Prosperous and Beautiful in the West) which were merged into the new Bình Thạnh in June 1976.
Gò Vấp	Vietnamese	Mound of Vấp	Named after "vấp" tree (Mesua ferrea), which used to be abundant in the area.
Phú Nhuận	Sino-Vietnamese	Wealth Enriches	Originally the name of a village in the era of Gia Long and Minh Mạng and shortened from the idiom "Phú nhuận ốc, đức nhuận thân" (Wealth enriches your house, but virtues enrich yourself).
Tân Bình	Sino-Vietnamese	New Peaceful	Named after the old Tân Bình Prefecture, which was created and named by Nguyễn Hữu Cảnh in 1698 after his own home Quảng Bình province, which in turn means "Vast and Peaceful".
Tân Phú	Sino-Vietnamese	New Wealthy	Originally the name of a commune in Tân Bình District, which was split from Tân Sơn Nhì Commune (Note: New Mountain the Second) and Phú Thọ Hòa Commune. (Note: Wealthy, Longevous and Harmonious) The district itself was split from Tân Bình District in 2003.

== Rural districts ==
Name	Language of origin	Literal translation	Meaning and notes
Bình Chánh	Sino-Vietnamese	Peaceful and Upright	Named after Bình Chánh Commune, which was the capital of the district.
Cần Giờ	Khmer		According to Trương Vĩnh Ký, Cần Giờ is a twisted transliteration of Khmer word "Kanchoeu", meaning "the basket", as the local people often used basket boats to commute.
Củ Chi	Vietnamese	Strychnine tree	Named after "củ chi" tree (Strychnos nux-vomica).
Hóc Môn	Vietnamese	Rivulet of Taro	Hóc means "rivulet", Môn means "water taro" (Colocasia esculenta), a kind of aquatic plant used to fill the place.
Nhà Bè	Vietnamese	Houseboat	According to the legends collected in Địa chí Đồng Nai, Gia Định thành thông chí and Biên Hòa Sử lược toàn biên, in the 18th century, there was a corrupted official named Võ Hữu Hoằng who then had a change of heart after visiting hell and generously spent his wealth to help people, including creating a large houseboat as a rest stop on nowadays Nhà Bè River.
