= Lòng Tàu River =

River in the Southeast region of Vietnam

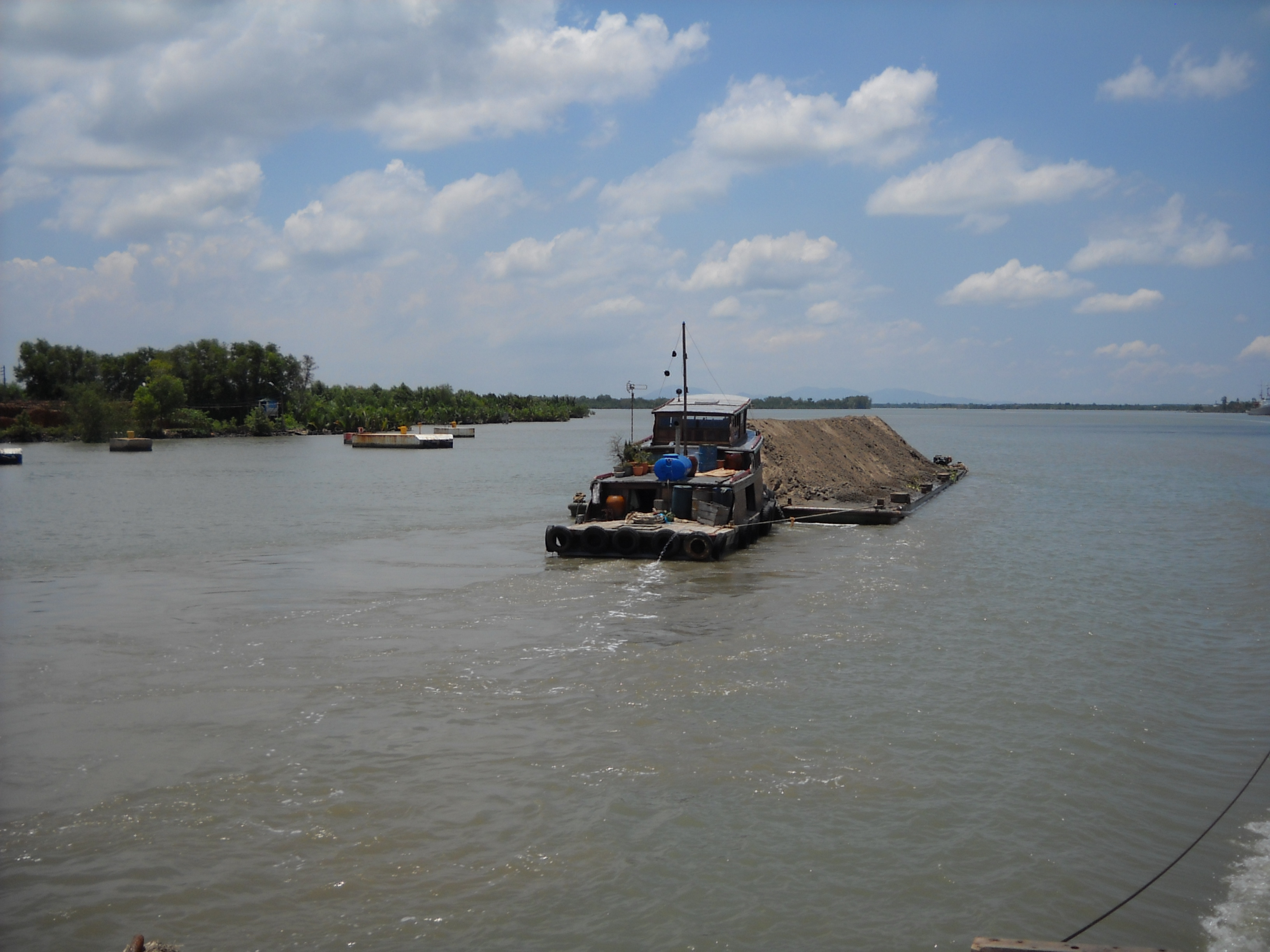
- Vessel moving along the Long Tau River
- Native name: Sông Lòng Tàu (Vietnamese)

Location
- Country: Vietnam

Basin features
- River system: Mekong River

Lòng Tàu River, (Vietnamese: Sông Lòng Tàu) also known as Lòng Tảo is a river in the Southeast of Vietnam.

== Description ==
Long Tau River is a distributary of the Đồng Nai river that runs through Cần Giờ district and feeds into Gành Rái Bay from its eastern branch at 10°40′10″N 106°47′24″E. It branches out when it reaches Nhơn Trạch district, with the western branch becoming the Đồng Tranh River into Soài Rạp River while the eastern branch is a continuation of the Lòng Tàu. Due to its complex and windy path, a system of skeletal range light towers are stationed along the river to help ship navigate. The Phước Khánh Bridge of Ben Luc – Long Thanh Expressway is currently under construction and will span the river

Overall, it runs for 75 kilometers from where it splits from the Dong Nai River and continues into Ganh Rai Bay. It has an average depth of 15 meters, running along the Cần Giờ Mangrove Forest before emptying out into the Ocean.

== History ==
As one of the primary waterways between Ho Chi Minh City and the Pacific Ocean, the Long Tau River has played a prominent economic and military role in the region. Its strategic location has made it the host of prominent warships and military operations and many times a strategic target for both attack and defense.

It currently connects to the Cai Mep deepwater port with a second container port in the works. The main route between Ho Chi Minh City and the Cai Mep terminal for vessels and barges is separately known as Long Tau Channel. As the case with many high-traffic rivers of the Mekong Delta, the banks of Long Tau River are lined with factories.

There have been a number of shipwrecks on record, including the sinking of the Vietsun Integrity cargoship in 2019.

Aside from a transport-focus waterway, the river also has had villages along its riverbanks, though there have been ongoing plans towards the economic development of the Can Gio communities. Despite its traffic, it remains a spot for fishermen.
