= Hiệp Phước =

Hiệp Phước Xã Hiệp Phước Long Thới, Nhơn Đức
- Commune
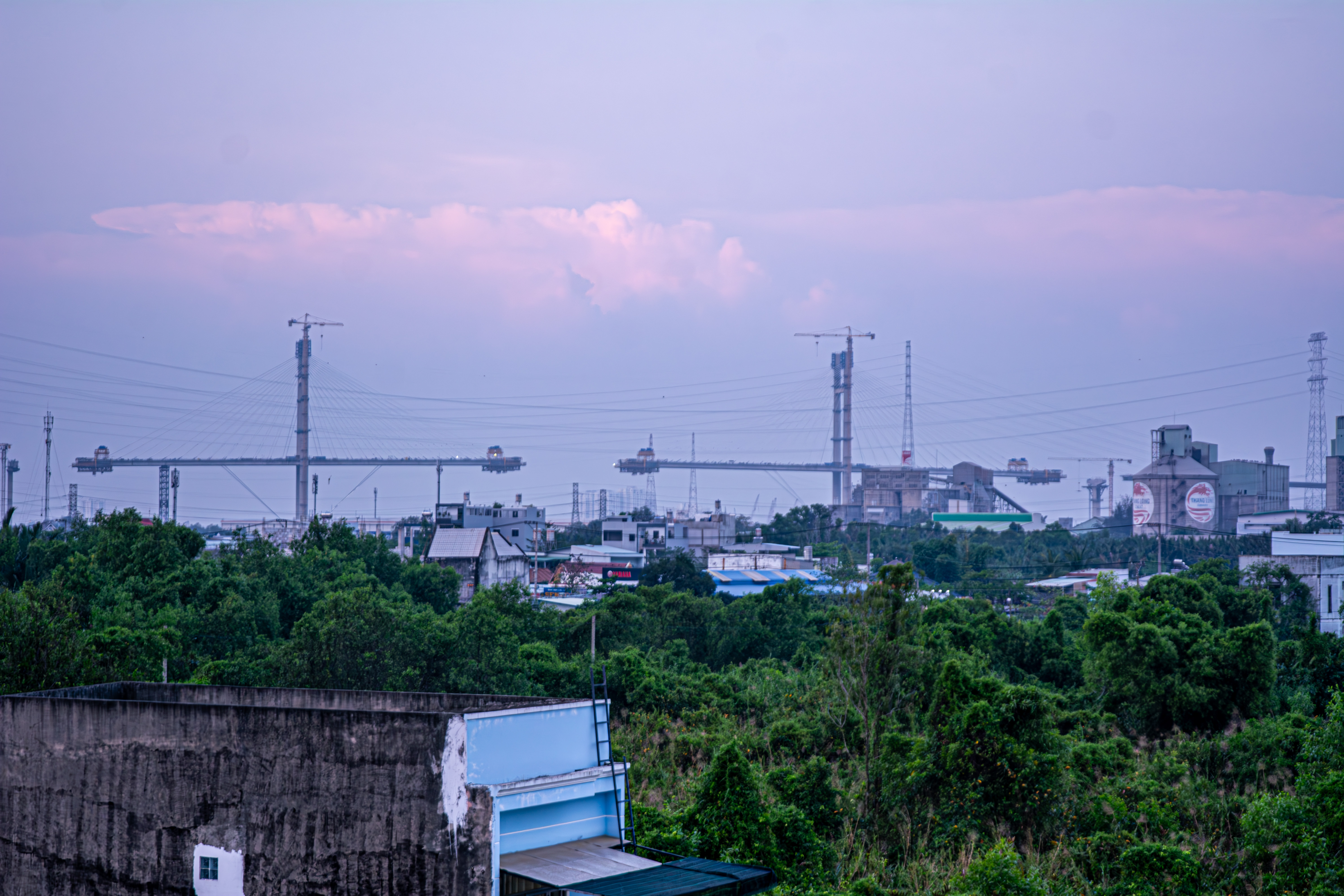
- View of Hiệp Phước with the under-construction Bình Khánh Bridge in the background
- Interactive map of Hiệp Phước
- Coordinates: 10°38′38″N 106°43′57″E
- Country: Vietnam
- Municipality: Ho Chi Minh City
- Established: June 16, 2025

Area
  - Total: 24.45 sq mi (63.33 km^{2})

Population (2024)
  - Total: 67,754
  - Density: 2,771/sq mi (1,070/km^{2})
- Time zone: UTC+07:00 (Indochina Time)
- Administrative code: 27658

Hiệp Phước (Vietnamese: Xã Hiệp Phước) is a commune of Ho Chi Minh City, Vietnam. It is one of the 168 new wards, communes and special zones of the city following the reorganization in 2025.

== Geography ==
Hiệp Phước lies in the south of Ho Chi Minh Ciy, about 35 km to the south of Sài Gòn, part of former Nhà Bè district, borders with:

- Nhà Bè to the north by Cây Khô and Mương Chuối creeks
- Bình Khánh and An Thới Đông to the east by Soài Rạp River
- Tân Tập and Cần Giuộc of Tây Ninh province
- Bình Hưng and Hưng Long in northwesr by Bà Lào Canal

According to Official Dispatch No. 2896/BNV-CQĐP dated May 27, 2025 of the Ministry of Home Affairs, following the merger, Tân Hưng has a land area of 63,33 km², the population as of December 31, 2024 is 67.754 people, the population density is 1,069 people/km² (statistical data as of December 31, 2024, in accordance with Article 6 of Resolution No. 76/2025/UBTVQH15 dated April 14, 2025, of the National Assembly Standing Committee).

== Division ==
As of July 2026, Hiệp Phước is divided into 27 hamlets (ấp): Bà Chồi, Bàu Le, Đồng Điền, Hiệp Phước Đông, Hiệp Phước Tây, Hiệp Thành, Long Đức, Long Hiệp, Long Khánh, Long Kiểng Đông, Long Kiểng Tây, Long Phước, Long Thành, Long Thới, Nhơn Đức, Nhơn Hòa, Nhơn Lộc, Nhơn Mỹ, Nhơn Nghĩa, Nhơn Phú, Nhơn Phước, Nhơn Thạnh, Phan Văn Bảy, Phú Lễ, Tân Phước, Thới Hòa, Thới Hiệp.

== History ==
On June 16, 2025, the National Assembly Standing Committee issued Resolution No. 1685/NQ-UBTVQH15 on the arrangement of commune-level administrative units of Ho Chi Minh City in 2025 (effective from June 16, 2025). Accordingly, the entire land area and population of Nhơn Đức, Long Thới and Hiệp Phước communes of the former Nhà Bè district will be integrated into a new commune named Hiệp Phước (Clause 135, Article 1).
