= Soài Rạp =

River in southern Ho Chi Minh City, Vietnam

Coordinates: 10°40′08″N 106°45′17″E

The Soài Rạp (Vietnamese: Sông Soài Rạp) is a river in Nhà Bè district and Cần Giờ district, south of Ho Chi Minh City; Cần Giuộc district and Cần Đước district, Long An province (now Tây Ninh province) and Gò Công Đông district, Tiền Giang province (now Đồng Tháp province), Vietnam.

== History ==
According to Pétrus Ky, the name Soài Rạp comes from the Khmer language word Pam Preak Kroy Phkam.

It joins the Vàm Cỏ in the Cần Giờ Mangrove Forest.

An international port in the Soài Rạp river, Hiệp Phước, can accommodate boats of up to 50,000 tons. It began operations on 21 June 2014 and will be upgraded to accommodate vessels of up to 70,000 tons in the near future.

== Bridges ==
- Bình Khánh Bridge on Ben Luc – Long Thanh Expressway, opened in 2026, connect Hiệp Phước and Bình Khánh
- Cần Giờ Bridge, on the route of Nguyễn Lương Bằng Avenue – Rừng Sác Road, to be constructed in late 2026, from Phú Mỹ Hưng Urban Area connect Nhà Bè with Bình Khánh

== See also ==
- Cần Giờ
