= Phước An =

Phước An Xã Phước An
- Commune
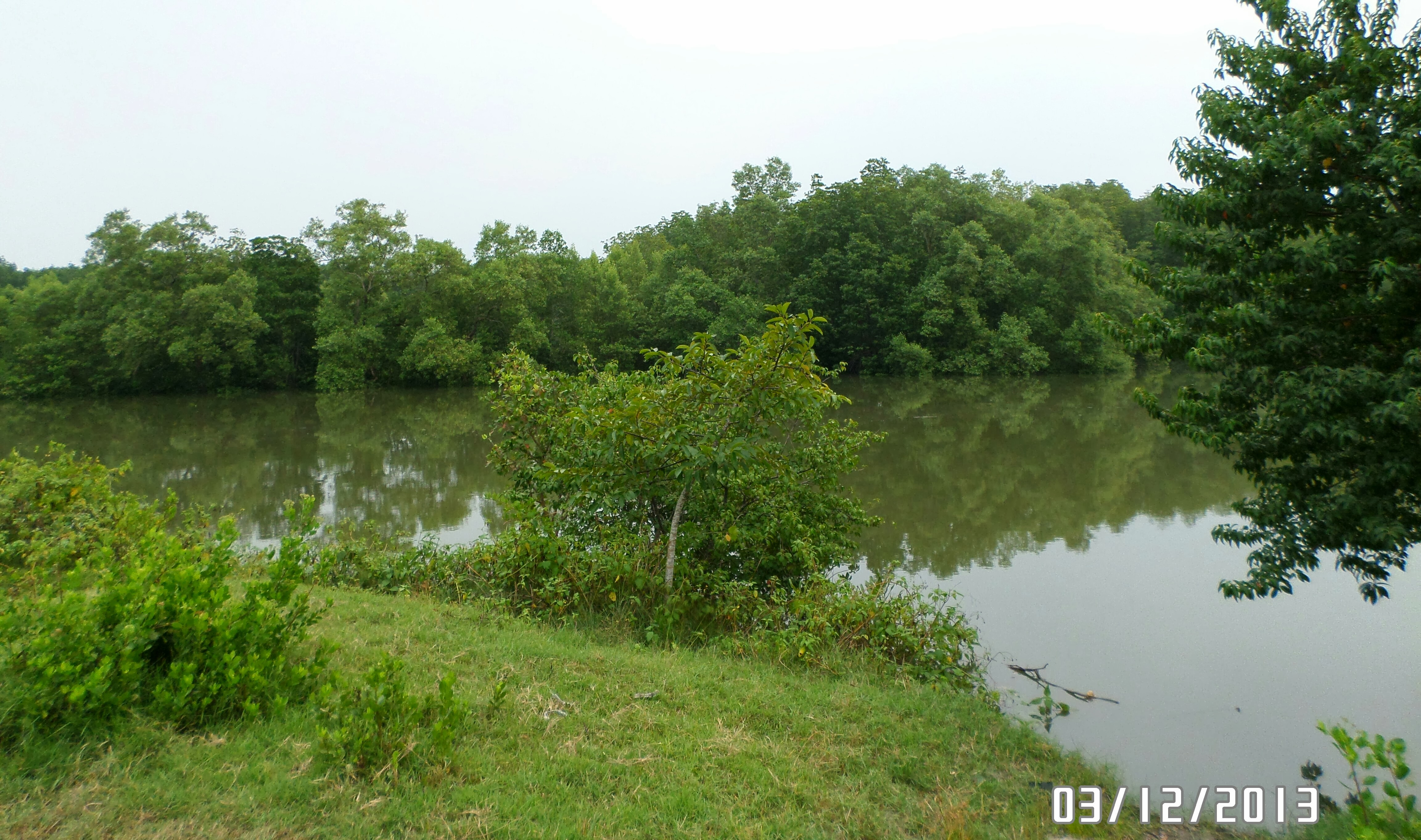
- A river in Phước An
- Interactive map of Phước An
- Coordinates: 10°39′23″N 106°56′39″E
- Country: Vietnam
- Municipality: Đồng Nai
- Established: June 16, 2025

Area
  - Total: 65.92 sq mi (170.72 km^{2})

Population (2024)
  - Total: 51,088
  - Density: 775.05/sq mi (299.25/km^{2})
- Time zone: UTC+07:00 (Indochina Time)
- Administrative code: 26503

Phước An (Vietnamese: Xã Phước An) is a commune of Đồng Nai, Vietnam. It is one of the 95 new wards, communes and special zones of the province following the reorganization in 2025.

== History ==
On June 16, 2025, the National Assembly Standing Committee issued Resolution No. 1662/NQ-UBTVQH15 on the arrangement of commune-level administrative units of Đồng Nai province in 2025 (effective from June 16, 2025). Accordingly, the entire land area and population of Vĩnh Thanh, Phước An and Long Thọ communes of the former Nhơn Trạch district will be integrated into a new commune named Phước An (Clause 3, Article 1).
