= Gia Định province =

Historic province of Vietnam

Gia Định Tỉnh Gia Định
- Province
- Interactive map of Gia Định
- Country: South Vietnam
- Region: Capital Military District
- Established: 1833
- Dissolved: May 1975
- Seat: Inspection de Gia-Dinh, Bình Hòa commune, Gò Vấp district
- Subdivisions: List: 8 districts

Gia Định (嘉定) was a former province of Vietnam under the Nguyễn dynasty and South Vietnam.

== History ==
In 1698, Lord Minh ordered Lễ Thành hầu establishing Gia Định prefecture with two districts in Cao Miên territory: Phúc Long district based on Đồng Nai, protected by Trấn Biên palace; and Tân Bình district based on Sài Gòn, protected by Phiên Trấn palace.

In 1715, Phiên Trấn commander – Trần Thượng Xuyên, and Trấn Biên deputy commander – Nguyễn Cửu Phú led Gia Định forces to support Nặc Yêm (Ang Em) in defeating Nặc Thâm (Ang Tham) and retaking the La Bích (Lavek) citadel. Lord Minh appointed Nặc Yêm as the new king of Cao Miên.

Gia Định province was first established in 1832 under the name Phiên An province when Emperor Minh Mạng divided Lower Cochinchina into Six Provinces. Phiên An province contained two prefectures: Tân Bình and Tân An, divided into five districts: Bình Dương, Tân Long, Thuận An, Phúc Lộc and Tân Hoà. Nguyễn Văn Quế was appointed the governor-general of An – Biên (Phiên An – Biên Hoà). Under Quế administration were: Bạch Xuân Nguyên – Phiên An provincial governor, and Vũ Quýnh - Biên Hoà provincial governor.

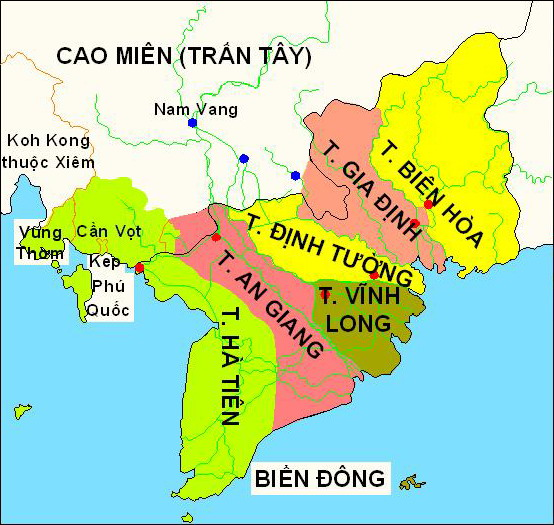
Nam Kỳ Lục tỉnh (1832 - 1841)

In February 1859, the French captured Gia Định citadel, besieged Gia Định province for two years, then completely occupied the province after the Battle of Kỳ Hòa in February 1861.

By 1944, the French colonists had divided Gia Định province to six smaller provinces: Gia Định, Tân Bình, Chợ Lớn, Tân An, Tây Ninh and Gò Công.

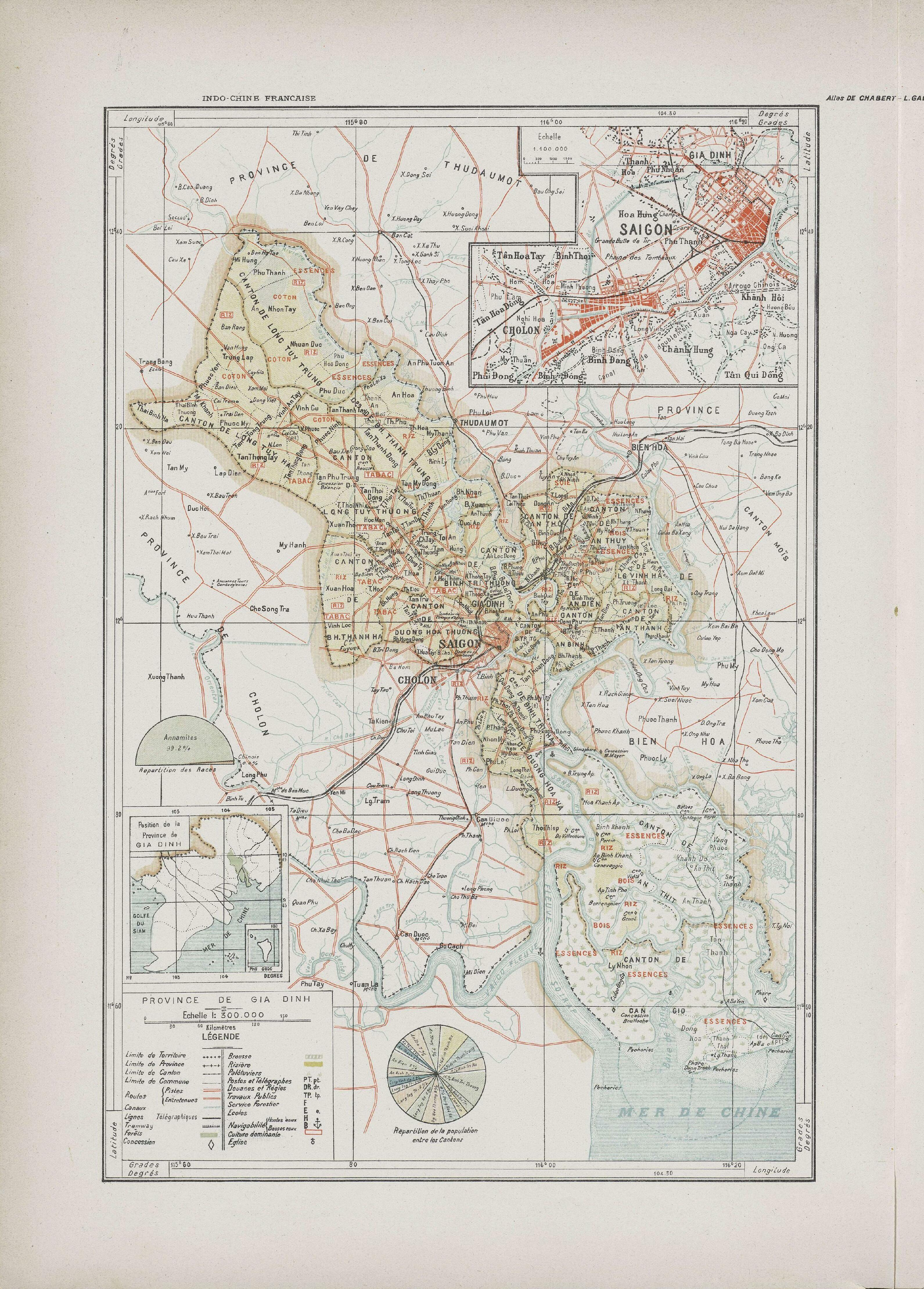
Map of Gia Định in 1909

In 1957, Gia Định contained 6 districts: Gò Vấp, Tân Bình, Hóc Môn, Thủ Đức, Nhà Bè and Bình Chánh.

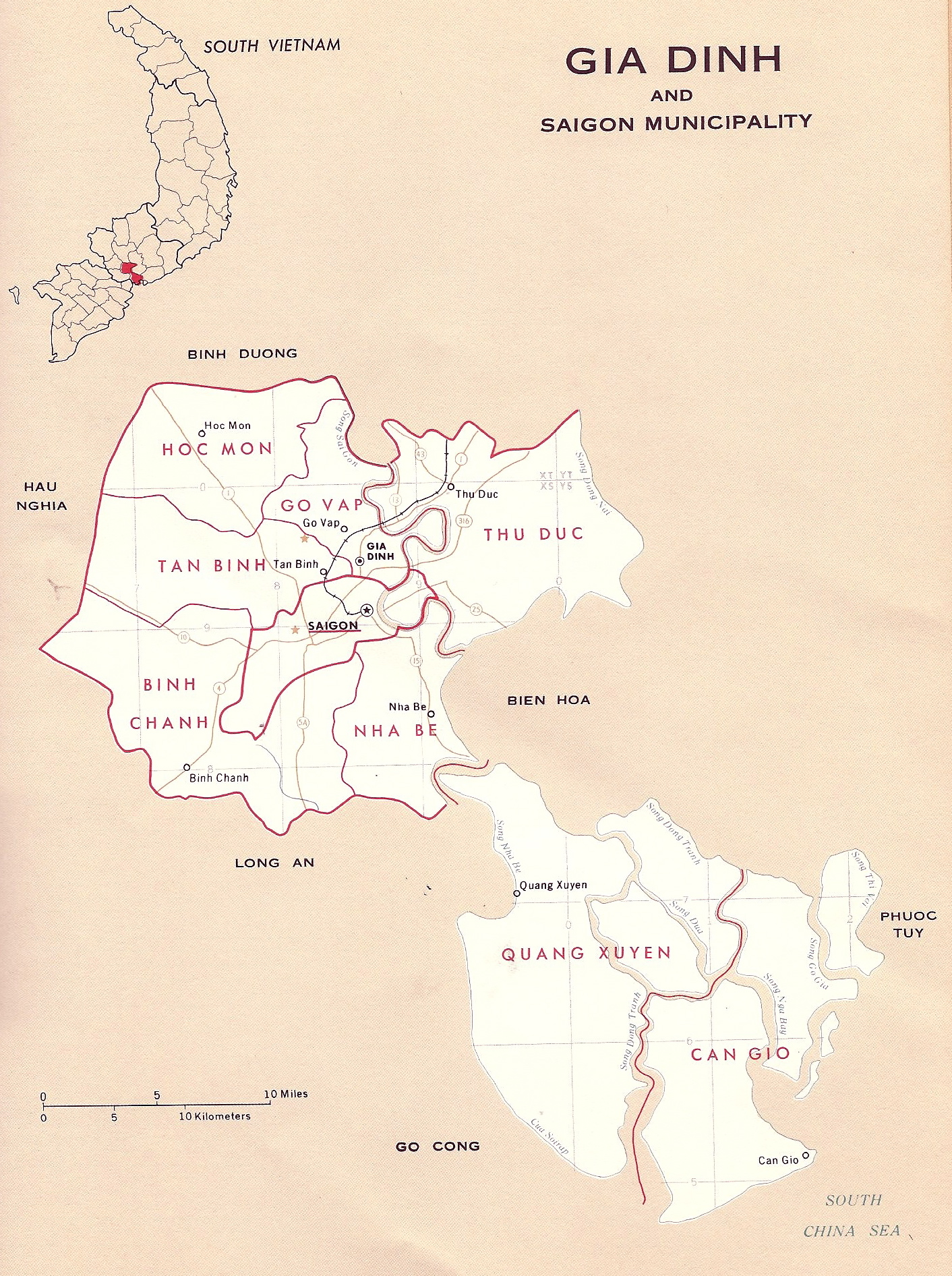
Gia Định-Sài Gòn in the Republic of Vietnam

In 1970, the districts of Quảng Xuyên and Cần Giờ were added. In February 1976, Saigon Municipality and parts of the provinces of Biên Hòa (which is now Cần Giờ district), Bình Dương and Hậu Nghĩa (which is now Củ Chi district) were annexed to Gia Định and it was renamed to Sài Gòn-Gia Định. During the South Vietnam period, Gia Định, Sài Gòn and Biên Hòa were the three main industrial centers of the country.

After the capture of Saigon on 30 April 1975, the province of Gia Định (initially without the estuary) and other areas of neighboring provinces (in particular the district of Củ Chi) were united with the city of Saigon in May. The city of Saigon-Gia Định (thành phố Sài Gòn – Gia Định) was created. This in turn was renamed Ho Chi Minh City (thành phố Hồ Chí Minh) on 2 July 1976.

== Notable people ==
- Nguyễn Hữu Cảnh, the founder and first viceroy of Gia Định.
- Former governors of the province include Nguyễn Văn Thành.
- Lê Văn Duyệt, the last viceroy of Gia Định before it was divided into Six Provinces.
