= Cần Giờ =

Cần Giờ Xã Cần Giờ Cần Thạnh
- Commune
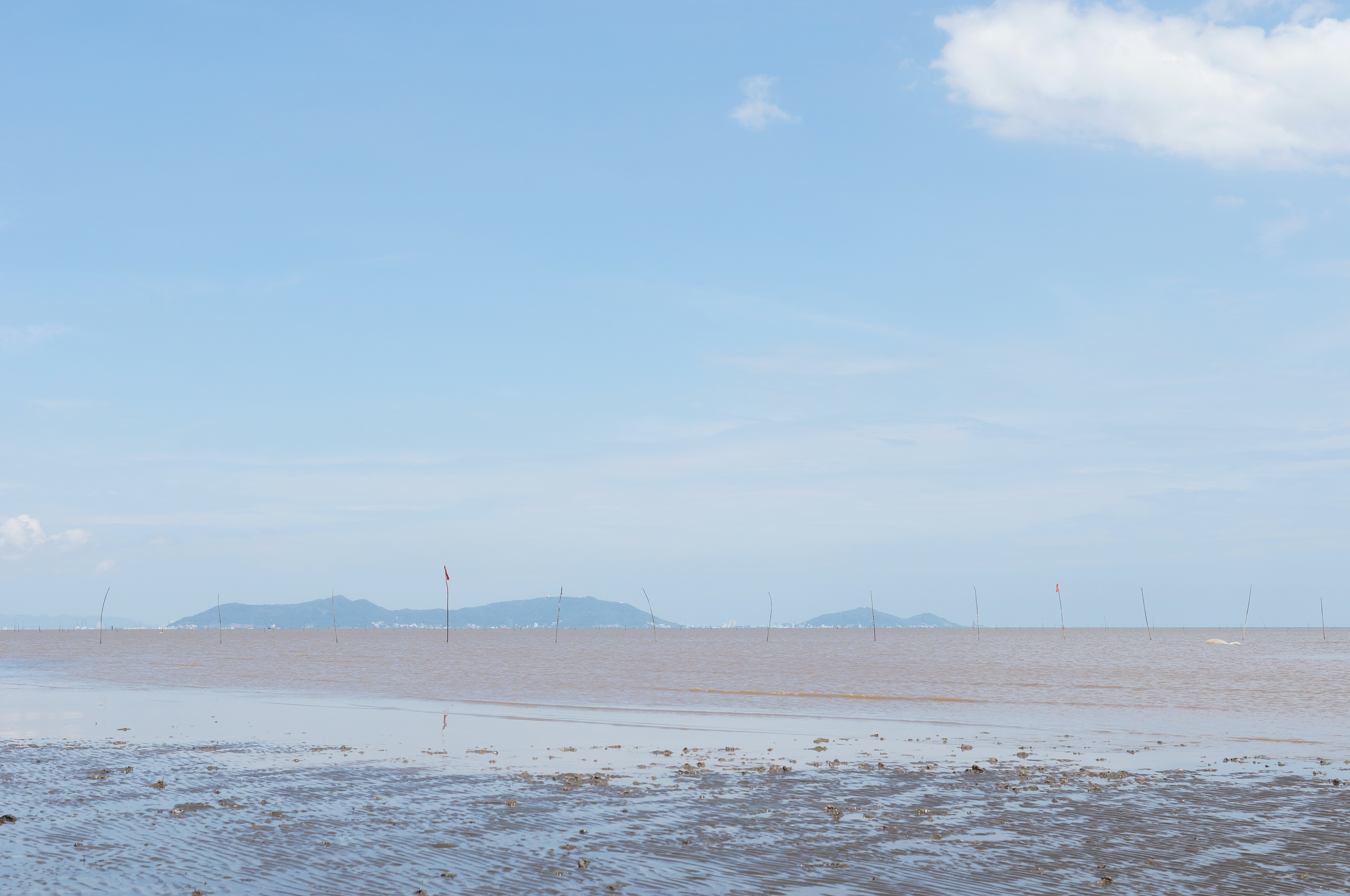
- Long Hòa Beach
- Interactive map of Cần Giờ
- Coordinates: 10°25′12″N 106°56′40″E
- Country: Vietnam
- Municipality: Ho Chi Minh City
- Established: June 16, 2025

Area
  - Total: 60.62 sq mi (157.01 km^{2})
- Elevation: 9.8 ft (3 m)

Population (2024)
  - Total: 27,130
  - Density: 447.5/sq mi (172.8/km^{2})
- Time zone: UTC+07:00 (Indochina Time)
- Administrative code: 27664

Cần Giờ (Vietnamese: Xã Cần Giờ) is a commune of Ho Chi Minh City, Vietnam. It is one of the 168 new wards, communes and special zones of the city following the reorganization in 2025.

== Geography ==
Cần Giờ commune is a coastal commune located in the southern part of Ho Chi Minh City, approximately 58 km south of Saigon ward. It is situated in the former Cần Giờ district area and has the following geographical boundaries:

- To the north: Borders Bình Khánh commune, with the Lòng Tàu River serving as the boundary.
- To the northeast: Borders Thạnh An commune.
- To the southeast: Borders Gành Rái Bay.
- To the south: Borders the South Sea China.
- To the west: Borders An Thới Đông commune, with the Dần Xây and Đồng Tranh Rivers serving as boundaries.

== History ==
Back then Cần Giờ was called Cần Thạnh and it was a commune of Cần Giờ District.

On November 5, 2003, the Government issued Decree 130/2003/ND-CP. It states that, Cần Thạnh, the district capital of Cần Giờ district, was established on the basis of the entire 2,408.93 hectares of natural area and 9,834 people of Cần Thạnh commune.

On June 16, 2025, the National Assembly Standing Committee issued Resolution No. 1685/NQ-UBTVQH15 on the arrangement of commune-level administrative units of Ho Chi Minh City in 2025 (effective from June 16, 2025). Accordingly, the entire land area and population of Cần Thạnh township and Long Hòa commune of the former Cần Giờ district will be integrated into a new commune named Cần Giờ (Clause 122, Article 1).

== Economy ==
The economy of the commune is mainly based on the exploitation of fishing, aquaculture, and aquatic products.
