= Hưng Long =

Hưng Long Xã Hưng Long Đa Phước, Qui Đức
- Commune
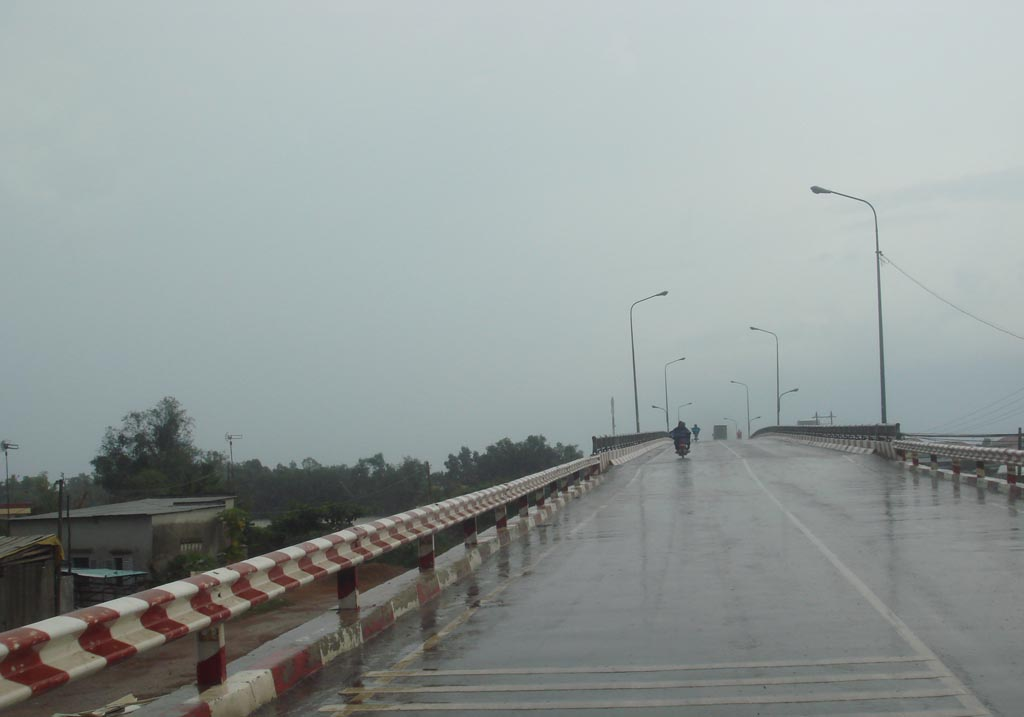
- Ông Thìn Bridge in Hưng Long

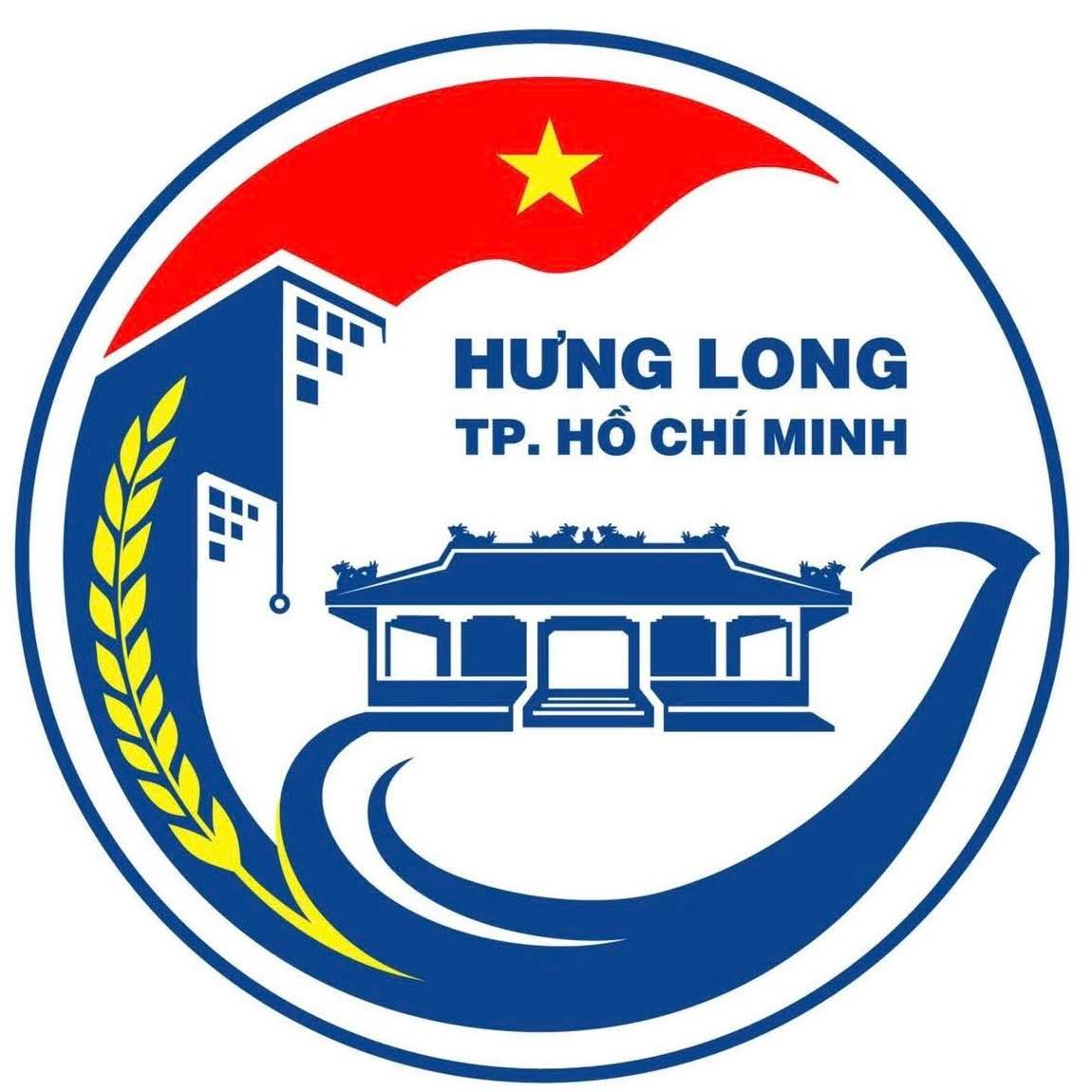
- Logo
- Interactive map of Hưng Long
- Coordinates: 10°39′31″N 106°38′20″E
- Country: Vietnam
- Municipality: Ho Chi Minh City
- Established: June 16, 2025

Area
  - Total: 13.72 sq mi (35.54 km^{2})

Population (2024)
  - Total: 71,504
  - Density: 5,211/sq mi (2,012/km^{2})
- Time zone: UTC+07:00 (Indochina Time)
- Administrative code: 27628

Hưng Long (Vietnamese: Xã Hưng Long) is a commune of Ho Chi Minh City, Vietnam. It is one of the 168 new wards, communes and special zones of the city following the reorganization in 2025.

== History ==
On June 16, 2025, the National Assembly Standing Committee issued Resolution No. 1685/NQ-UBTVQH15 on the arrangement of commune-level administrative units of Ho Chi Minh City in 2025 (effective from June 16, 2025). Accordingly, the entire land area and population of Đa Phước, Qui Đức and Hưng Long communes of the former Bình Chánh district will be integrated into a new commune named Hưng Long (Clause 118, Article 1).
