= Cần Giờ district =

Cần Giờ district Huyện Cần Giờ Duyên Hải, Quảng Xuyên
- District
- Seal

- Cần Giờ in the metropolitan area of HCMC

- Location within Vietnam
- Coordinates: 10°30′43″N 106°52′50″E
- Country: Vietnam
- Centrally governed city: Ho Chi Minh City
- Seat: Cần Thạnh Town
- Divisions: 1 township (thị trấn), 6 communes (xã)

Area
  - Total: 704 km^{2} (272 sq mi)

Population (2019)
  - Total: 71,526
  - Density: 102/km^{2} (263/sq mi)
- Time zone: UTC+07 (ICT)
- Website: cangio.hochiminhcity.gov.vn

Cần Giờ was a coastal suburban district of Ho Chi Minh City, in the Southeast region of Vietnam.

The district is located 50 km from downtown Ho Chi Minh City. As of 2019, the district had an area of 704.45 km^{2} (271.99 sq mi) and population of 71,526. Cần Giờ is home to Cần Giờ Mangrove Forest, a biosphere reserve listed by UNESCO.

== Geographical location ==
Cần Giờ district located in the southeast part of Ho Chi Minh City, it borders:

- Nhà Bè district to the north, by Soài Rạp river
- Cần Giuộc district and Cần Đước district, Long An and Gò Công Đông district, Tiền Giang provinces to the west by Soài Rạp river
- Nhơn Trạch district, Đồng Nai province to the northeast by Đồng Tranh river
- Phú Mỹ, Bà Rịa–Vũng Tàu province to the southeast by Thị Vải river, and Vũng Tàu by the Gành Rái Bay (East Sea) to the south.

== Natural conditions ==
Cần Giờ District borders the East Sea with approximately 20 km of coastline on Gành Rái Bay. It is home to the Cần Giờ mangrove forest, a vast wetland interwoven with a dense network of rivers and canals. This ecosystem boasts high biodiversity, featuring many endemic plant and animal species native to Vietnam’s coastal regions. The district has 32,109 hectares of forestry land (46.45% of the total area) and 22,850 hectares of rivers and canals (32% of the total area). The mangrove region accounts for 56.7% of the district's total area. Additionally, the district contains around 69 islands of various sizes.

== Transportation ==
As the district is island and all borders to river mouth flows into sea that are important shipping routes with most of the area is reserve forest, bridge construction here was limited and considered and it was only access by ferry terminals, including: Bình Khánh (Cần Giờ – Nhà Bè), Vàm Sát – Tân Tập (Cần Giờ – Cần Giuộc), Lý Nhơn – Gia Thuận (Cần Giờ – Gò Công), Quốc Chánh (Cần Giờ – Vũng Tàu).

However, bridges and roads are planned to connect this area, including the Cần Giờ Bridge (on Nguyễn Lương Bằng Avenue, run from Phú Mỹ Hưng urban area), pair of bridges of Bình Khánh (crosses Soài Rạp river) and Phước Khánh(crosses Lòng Tàu river) on Ben Luc – Long Thanh Expressway, from west to east respectively with an interchange with Rừng Sác Road. Cross-country coastal road, stretch from Vũng Tàu to Gò Công and crosses the district. A rapid transit railway from Ben Thanh station connect to Cần Giờ Beach, is planned to constructed in December 2025.

== History ==
In 1822, British ambassador John Crawfurd visited Cần Giờ during his journey to Siam and Cochinchina, noting that it was a poor region but with friendly and civilized people.

During the French colonial period, on December 18, 1872, the French established Cần Giờ canton from parts of two other cantons in Bình Dương District, Gia Định Province. Later, in 1875, An Thít canton was separated. By 1947, both Cần Giờ and An Thít cantons were transferred from Gia Định Province to Vũng Tàu Province, forming Cần Giờ District under this province.

Between 1956 and 1976, the Republic of Vietnam made several administrative adjustments. Initially, Cần Giờ District was part of Vũng Tàu Town but was later transferred to Phước Tuy Province and divided into two districts: Cần Giờ and Quảng Xuyên. In 1960, both districts became part of Biên Hòa Province, and in 1965, they were merged into Gia Định Province, maintaining this status until 1975.

On the revolutionary government's side, Cần Giờ always belonged to Gia Định Province. In 1968, Cần Giờ District was merged with several communes from Biên Hòa and Bà Rịa provinces to form Duyên Hải District. After April 30, 1975, this district remained part of Biên Hòa Province until 1976.

Since 1976, Duyên Hải District belonged to Đồng Nai Province. On December 29, 1978, the district was merged into Ho Chi Minh City. In 1991, Duyên Hải District was renamed Cần Giờ. In 2003, Cần Thạnh Town was established.

== Administration ==
Cần Giờ district includes the district capital town of Cần Thạnh and six communes:

- Bình Khánh
- An Thới Đông
- Tam Thôn Hiệp
- Thạnh An
- Lý Nhơn
- Long Hòa
