= Cần Giờ Mangrove Forest =

Wetland in Vietnam

Coordinates: 10.3100°N 106.7400°E

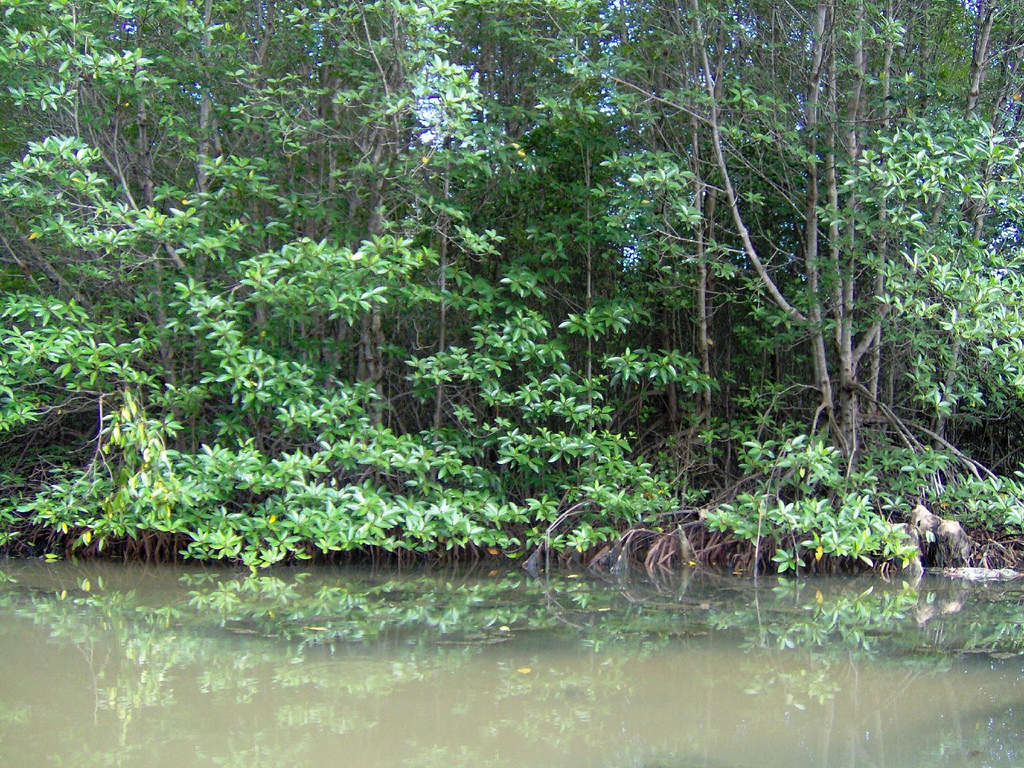
Cần Giờ Biosphere Reserve

Cần Giờ Biosphere Reserve (Vietnamese: Khu dự trữ sinh quyển rừng ngập mặn Cần Giờ) or simply known as Mangrove Forest (Rừng Sác) is a wetland located at the eponymous coastal district that 40 km southeast away from the centre of Ho Chi Minh City. This reserve has been listed as a biosphere reserve by UNESCO. The site is an important wildlife sanctuary in Vietnam as it is characterized by a wetland biosystem dominated by mangrove and many rare species.

The forest's area is 75,740 ha (757.4 km^{2}), with over 150 botanical species.

== Biodiversity value ==
The major habitat types found at Cần Giờ include planted mangroves with 20,000 ha cover, and naturally regenerated mangroves with 7,000 ha. Moreover, there have been a total of 18 molluscs, 27 crustaceans, 45 fish, and three amphibian species recorded at the site. Saltwater crocodiles used to live in the wild here and are now in the protected area. Also, Dugong has been reported to appear seasonally in seagrass beds at the protected area, although these reports have not been confirmed. The intertidal mudflats and sandbanks at the biosphere reserve are an important habitat for migratory shorebirds.

With diverse habitat and biodiversity values, Cần Giờ is considered as the 'green lungs' for Ho Chi Minh City to absorb carbon dioxide and pollutants.

== Tourism ==
Cần Giờ Mangrove Forest and Biosphere Reserve is developed as a special eco-tourism site. Various resources are exploited such as mangroves forest, marine resources, natural rivers, traditional craft villages Thieng Lieng Hamlet salt village, Tam Thon Hiep Commune with bird farming, Long Hoa Commune with fishing. Economically, Can Gio Biosphere Reserve has changed this location from the poorest district of Ho Chi Minh city to a central development tourism area.

Coming to Cần Giờ, visitors can travel to Sac Forest Tourism Area, monkey islands, enjoying the nature and local food here. The best time to travel is from December to March.

== Transport ==
If you want to travel by motorbike, it will allow you to take the initiative to arrange your time. You can hire a motorbike near your hotels, prepare a map and start your journey to Can Gio Island.

You can also travel by bus. From Ben Thanh Market, you catch the bus No.20 and get off at Binh Khanh Ferry. Cross the ferry then continue to take the bus No.90 to Can Gio Island. Remember to announce the driver your next stop, because there is no bus stop in Can Gio Island.

Or you can also go there by car. Travelling by car is the most convenient way to get to Can Gio Island. You can book a Grab car from Ho Chi Minh City Center and reach Can Gio Island in about one hour and a half.

== Other documented values ==
The mangrove forest at Cần Giờ performs many valuable ecological functions, including coastal stabilisation, and protection against coastal erosion, oil spills and storm surges. The mangrove forest is a source of fuel wood and construction materials.

== See also ==
- Rung Sat Special Zone
