= Nhơn Trạch district =

Coordinates: 10.667°N 106.917°E

Nhơn Trạch district Huyện Nhơn Trạch
- District
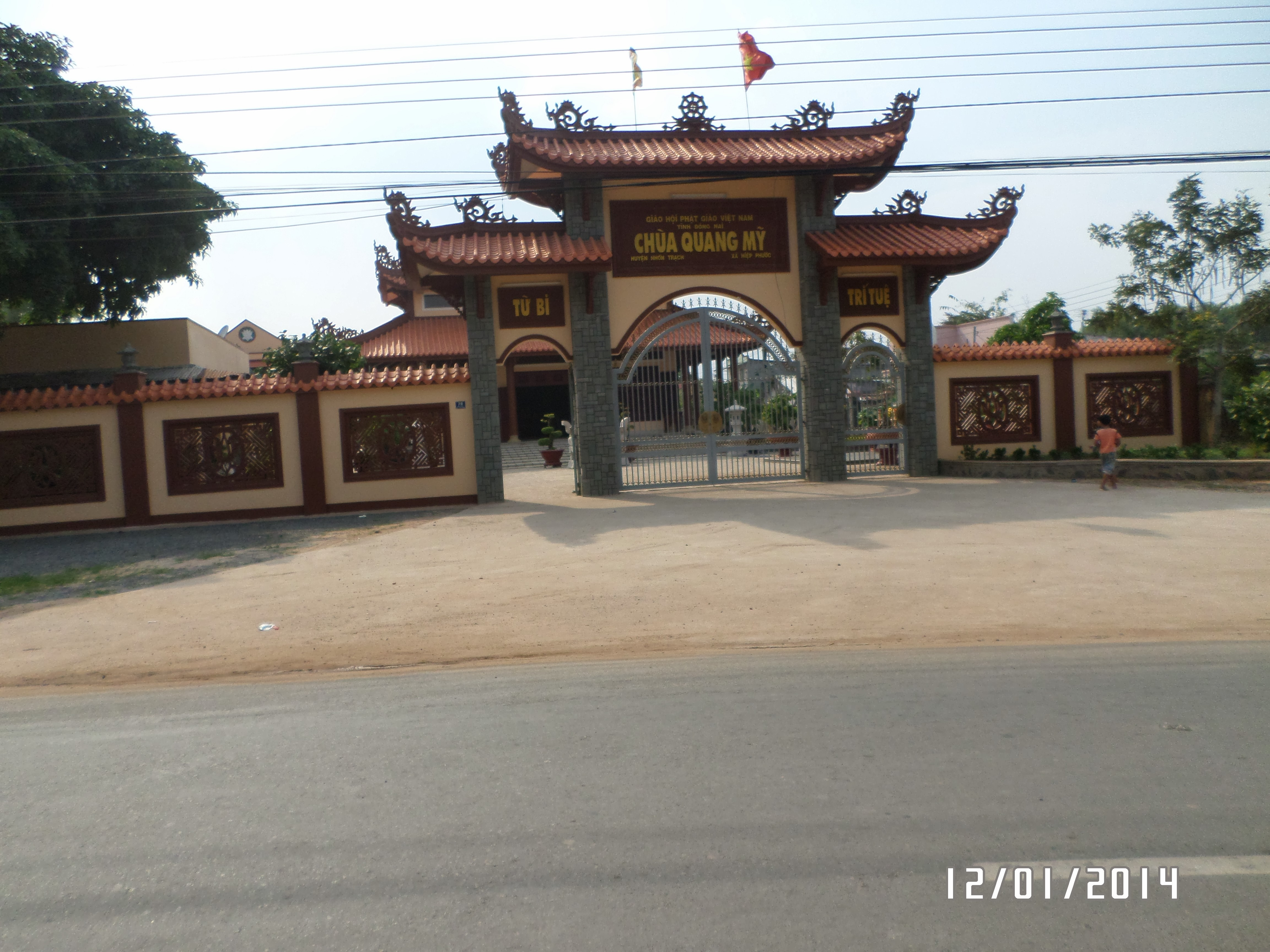
- Chùa Quang Mỹ temple

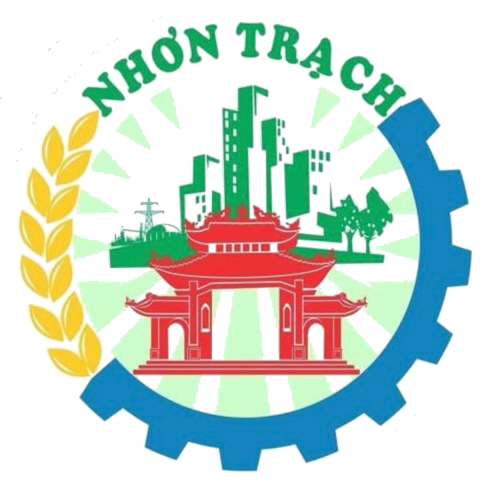
- Seal
- Interactive map of Nhơn Trạch district
- Country: Vietnam
- Region: Southeast
- Province: Đồng Nai
- Capital: Phú Hội

Area
  - Total: 166 sq mi (431 km^{2})

Population (2019 census)
  - Total: 260,592
  - Density: 1,570/sq mi (605/km^{2})
- Time zone: UTC+7 (Indochina Time)

Nhơn Trạch is a former rural district of Đồng Nai province in the Southeast region of Vietnam. As of 2019 the district had a population of 260,592. The district covers an area of 431 km^{2} (166 sq mi). The district capital is at Phú Hội.
