= Nhà Bè district =

Nhà Bè district Huyện Nhà Bè
- District
- Seal

- Position in HCMC's metropolitan area

- Location within Vietnam
- Coordinates: 10°39′6″N 106°43′35″E
- Country: Vietnam
- Centrally governed city: Ho Chi Minh City
- Seat: Nhà Bè Town
- Divisions: 1 township, 6 communes

Area
  - Total: 100 km^{2} (39 sq mi)

Population (2019)
  - Total: 206,837
  - Density: 2,100/km^{2} (5,400/sq mi)

Demographics
  - Main ethnic groups: predominantly Kinh
- Time zone: UTC+07 (ICT)
- Website: nhabe.hochiminhcity.gov.vn

Nhà Bè is a former suburban district of Ho Chi Minh City, the largest city in Vietnam. As of 2019, this district had an area of 100 km^{2} (39 sq mi) and population of 206,837.

== Geographical location ==
Nhà Bè borders District 7 to the north, Long An province to the south, Đồng Nai province to the northeast, Cần Giờ district to the southeast, and Bình Chánh district to the west.

== Administration ==
Nhà Bè district includes the town of Nhà Bè and six communes:

- Hiệp Phước
- Long Thới
- Nhơn Đức
- Phú Xuân
- Phước Kiển
- Phước Lộc

After 2025 Vietnamese administrative reforms, the first three communes combined into one commune named Hiệp Phước, the latter three with Nhà Bè town formed into Nhà Bè commune.
