= Bình Khánh =

Bình Khánh Xã Bình Khánh Tam Thôn Hiệp, An Thịt
- Commune
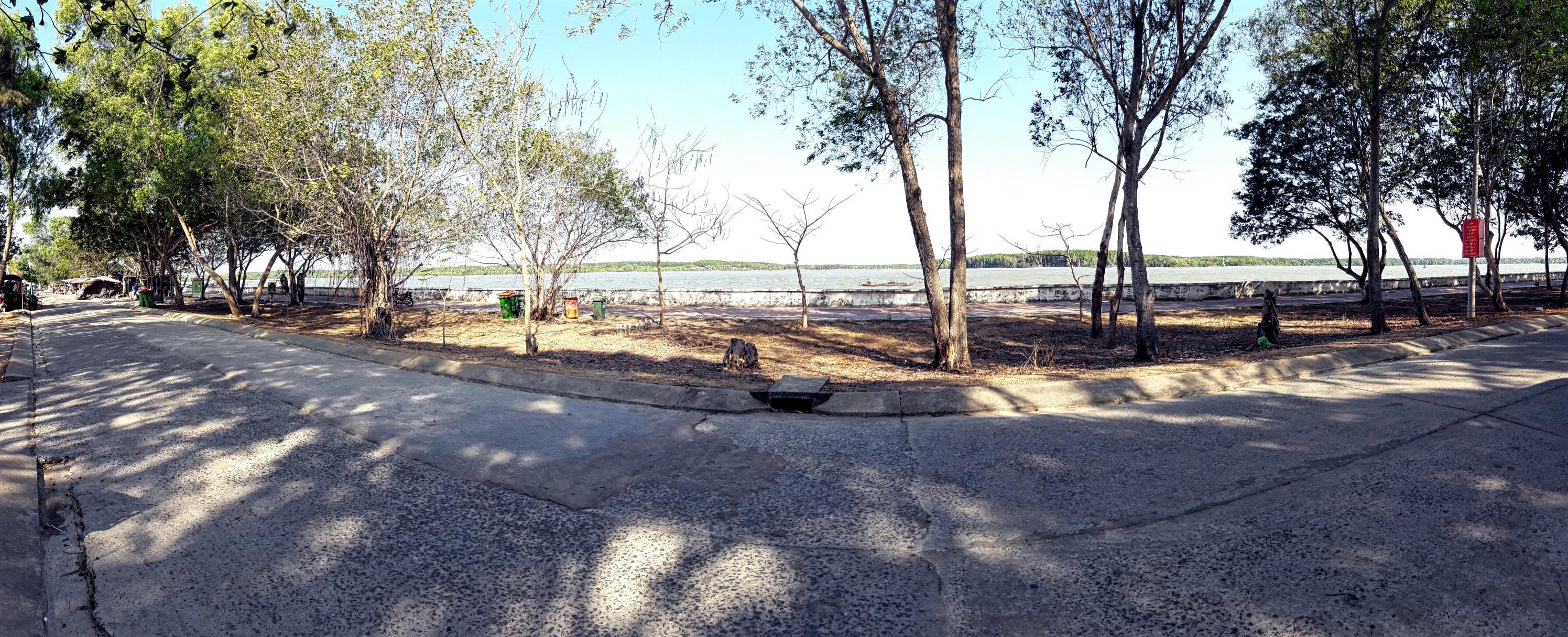
- A road in Bình Khánh
- Interactive map of Bình Khánh
- Coordinates: 10°38′37″N 106°47′16″E
- Country: Vietnam
- Municipality: Ho Chi Minh City
- Established: June 16, 2025

Area
  - Total: 61.11 sq mi (158.28 km^{2})

Population (2024)
  - Total: 35,482
  - Density: 580.60/sq mi (224.17/km^{2})
- Time zone: UTC+07:00 (Indochina Time)
- Administrative code: 27667

Bình Khánh (Vietnamese: Xã Bình Khánh) is a commune of Ho Chi Minh City, Vietnam. It is one of the 168 new wards, communes and special zones of the city following the reorganization in 2025.

== History ==
On June 16, 2025, the National Assembly Standing Committee issued Resolution No. 1685/NQ-UBTVQH15 on the arrangement of commune-level administrative units of Ho Chi Minh City in 2025 (effective from June 16, 2025). Accordingly, the entire land area and population of Bình Khánh, Tam Thôn Hiệp communes and part of An Thới Đông commune of the former Cần Giờ district will be integrated into a new commune named Bình Khánh (Clause 120, Article 1).
