= Gành Rái Bay =

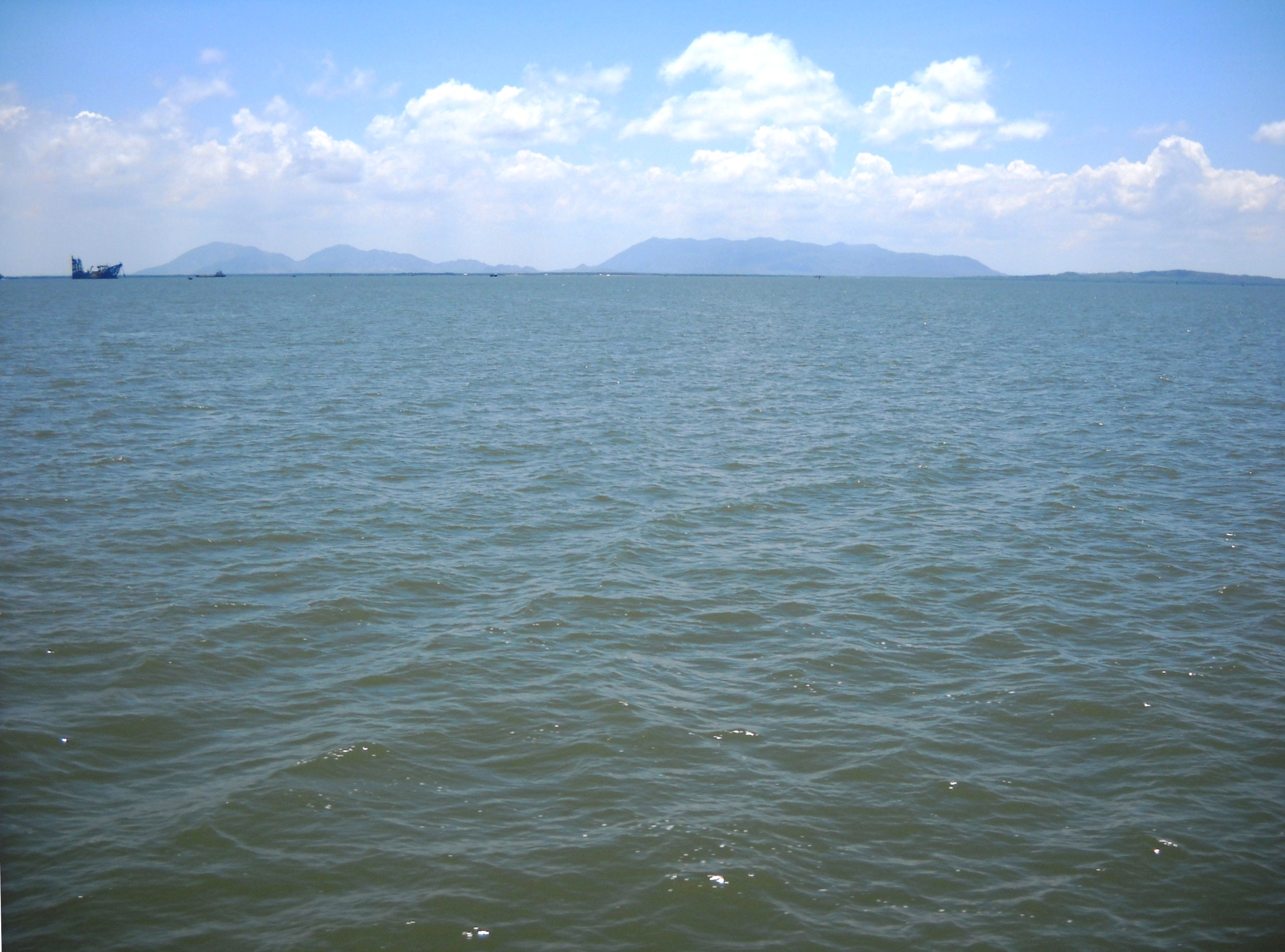
- Lòng Tàu River flows into Gành Rái Bay
- Interactive map of Gành Rái Bay
- Location: Ho Chi Minh City, Southeast region
- Coordinates: 10.424280°N 107.015465°E
- Type: Bay
- Primary inflows: Lòng Tàu River, Đồng Tranh River, Thị Vải River, Dinh River
- Primary outflows: Cần Giờ Estuary
- Catchment area: ~1,000 km^{2} (390 sq mi)
- Basin countries: Vietnam
- Settlements: Ho Chi Minh City: Cần Giờ, Phú Mỹ, Vũng Tàu

Gành Rái Bay (Vietnamese: Vịnh Gành Rái, lit. 'Bay of otters headland') is a large tidal estuary in Ho Chi Minh City, Southeast region of Vietnam, where the major rivers in the region meet, such as Lòng Tàu River, Đồng Tranh River (from the west side), Thị Vải River and Dinh River (from the north side) into the low-lying bay.

It is surrounded by mainland and islands in three directions are North, West and East, while the South is South China Sea. To the east is Long Sơn and Gò Găng Island, Vũng Tàu peninsula with Nghinh Phong cape, to the west is Cần Thạnh and Thạnh An (Cần Giờ district) landmass with Đồng Tranh cape, embracing the bay on three sides. The side facing the sea is the Cần Giờ estuary, which is the main sea entrance to Saigon Port.

== History ==
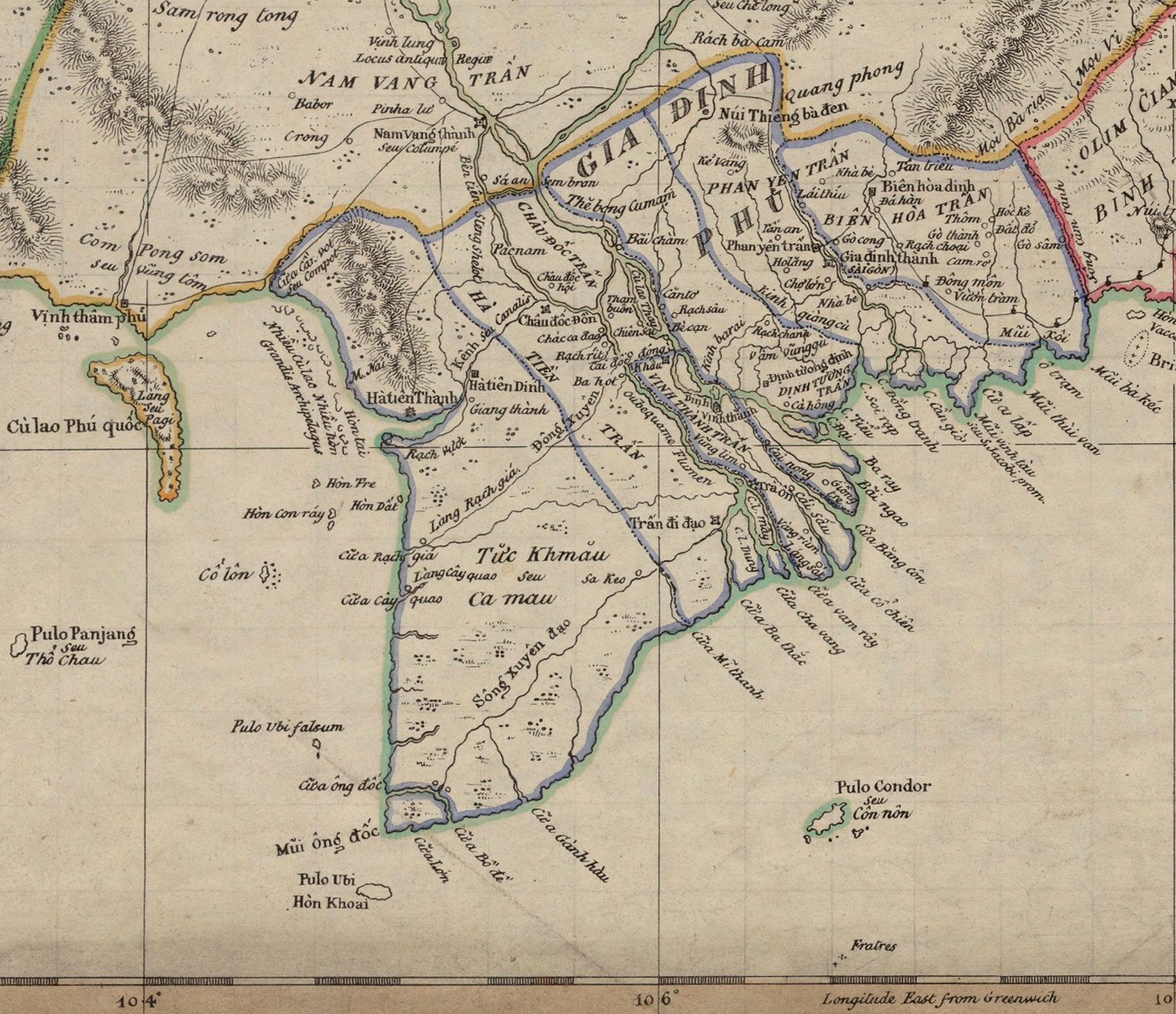
Map of Southern Vietnam in 1838, taken from An Nam Đại Quốc Họa Đồ (Map of the Great Kingdom of An Nam) by French missionary Jean-Louis Taberd.

According to Đại Nam nhất thống chí by Trịnh Hoài Đức, the two mountains, Big Mountain and Small Mountain (Núi Lớn và Núi Nhỏ in Vietnamese) in Vũng Tàu, were also called Gành Rái Mountain as the otters (Rái in Vietnamese) often gathered there, means the Bay of Otters headland. Gành Rái Bay probably also took its name from there because it was located further inward from the sea entrance after passing those two mountains from offshore upstream towards Gia Định.

The bay's bottom is relatively shallow, so large ships cannot easily enter or exit. To allow large merchant ships to reach Saigon on the Saigon–Vũng Tàu shipping channel, the bay's bottom was dredged to maintain a depth of 8.5 meters or more. The shipping channel through Gành Rái Bay is 400 meters wide and has buoys for ships to identify when navigating.

Besides its important role in waterway transportation, Gành Rái Bay is also a large fishing ground with many aquaculture farms raising shrimp, fishes, and bivalves such as clams and oysters. The Cần Giờ mangrove forest is a biosphere reserve recognized by UNESCO that nurtures young shrimp and fish. People living along the bay also use the bay's natural terrain to make salt fields. Fishermen often use basket boats when they off shore.

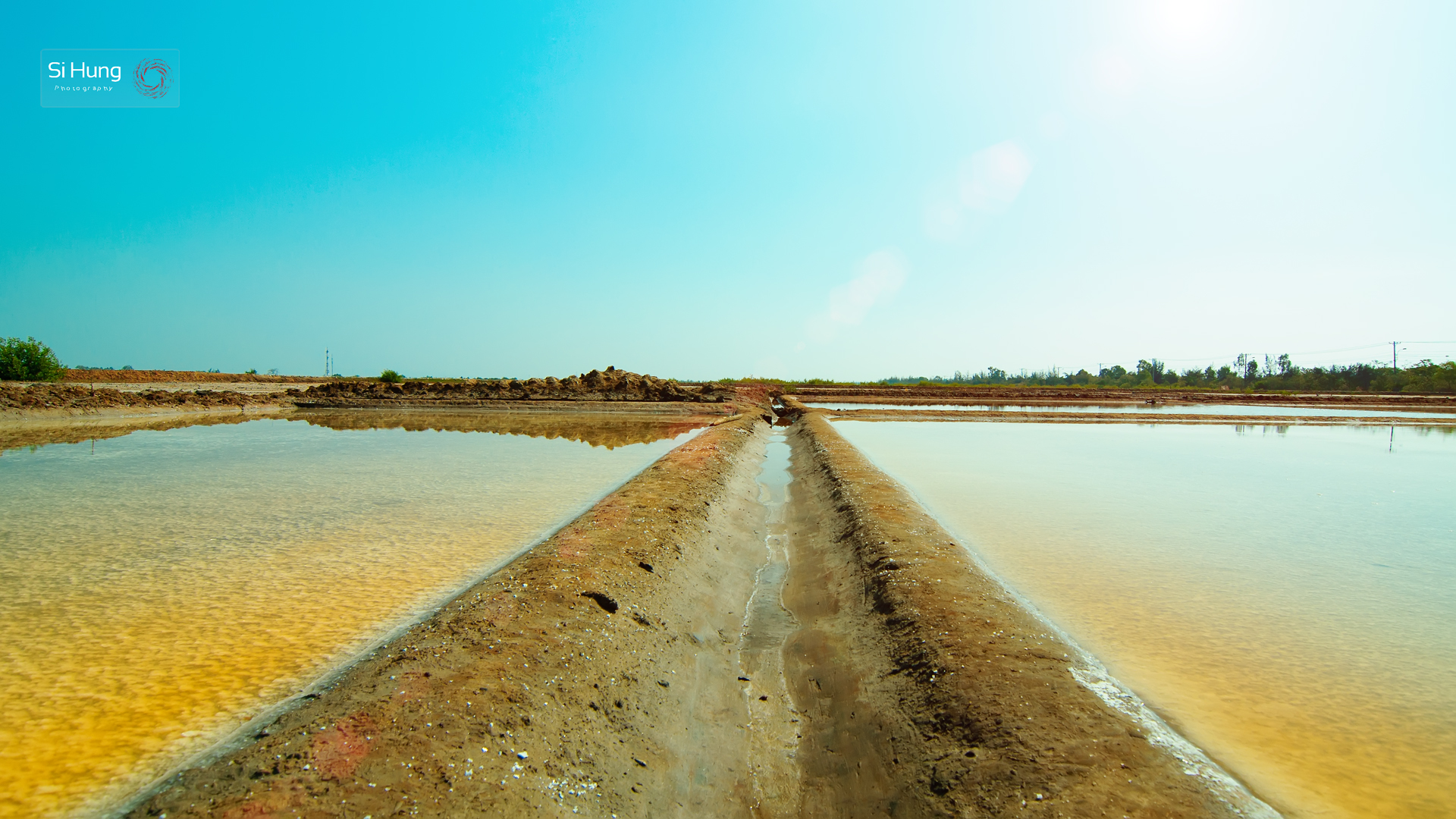
Salt field

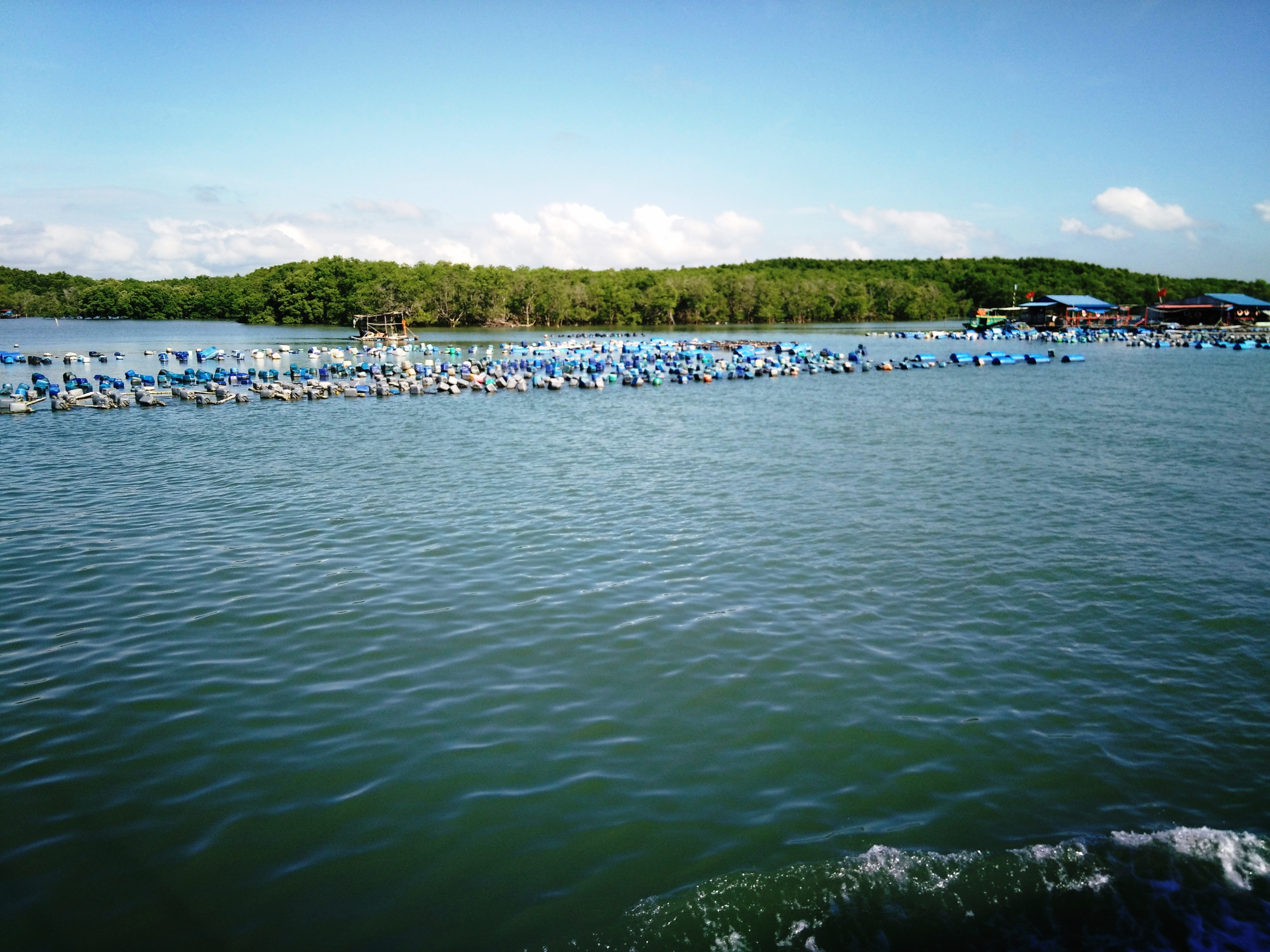
Aquaculture farms

== Transportation ==
The Cần Giờ–Vũng Tàu Bridge–tunnel is expected to be under construction in July 2026, with the two bridges in both Cần Giờ and Vũng Tàu side with a tunnel in the middle connected with the bridges by two artificial islands. It will have about 6 to 8 lanes. The bridge–tunnel is part of the national coastal road, connecting Vũng Tàu from Provincial Road 994, via Cần Giờ then will connected to the west section of the coastal road, starts at East Gò Công area.

== Ports ==
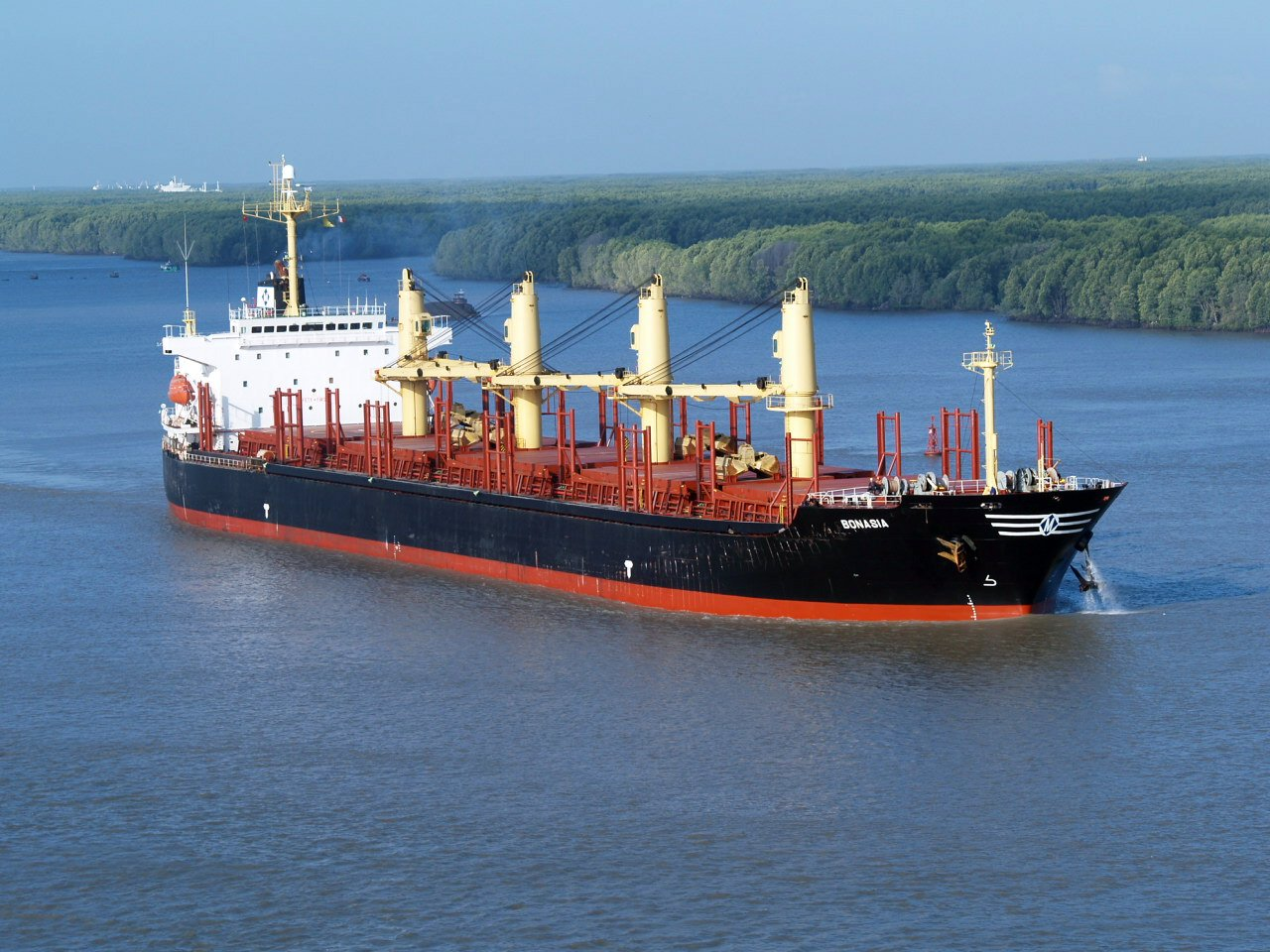
Bonasia, IMO 9220483 across Gành Rái Bay in 2009

Thanks to its deep sea location, Gành Rái Bay is chose to be the logistics hub with many ports are and planned to be built, lead to it being the top-most busiest maritime waters not also in Vietnam but also in the Southeast Asia. The Cái Mép – Thị Vải Port Complex, located directly to the bay in Phú Mỹ, Bà Rịa–Vũng Tàu (now is Tân Phước, Ho Chi Minh City), a deep sea port of Vũng Tàu Port system, was once ranked 7th globally in operational efficiency, according to the Container Port Performance Index from World Bank and S&P Global. It is also ranked 31st in size/throughput among the world's 50 busiest container ports by Dutch maritime consultancy DynaLiners for container throughput, handling roughly 7 million TEUs. The port has a length of 20 km with 35 piers.

The Lower Cái Mép (Cái Mép Hạ) area in the south of current Cái Mép – Thị Vải Port Complex will build new ports and launch the Free-trade zone, FTZ Cái Mép Hạ, that link to the current Cái Mép and Lower Cái Mép, it occupies an area of 3,800 hectares in Tân Phước (Phú Mỹ).

Moreover, the Government of Vietnam has decided to build the Cần Giờ International Trans-shipment Port on Phú Lợi islet (Cù lao Phú Lợi), colloquially known as Cù lao Gò Con Chó (Gò Con Chó islet, or more literally Mound of Dog-shape islet), in Thạnh An, Ho Chi Minh City, cover an area of 571 hectares, next to Cái Mép Port, it will be linked with the FTZ Cần Giờ. Once all completed, combined with the airway of Long Thanh International Airport and intermodal railways, the whole bay is expected to be one of the major logistics hub, also an economic hub of Vietnam or even in the region.

== Reclaimation ==
The beach side in Long Hòa and Cần Thạnh (both were merged into Cần Giờ commune) has been reclaimed for the planned city by Vingroup initially named as Vinhomes Eco Green then renamed as Vinhomes Green Paradise, it will feature arenas, stadiums, theaters, houses, apartments, accommodations and an 108-story skyscraper.

=== Criticism ===
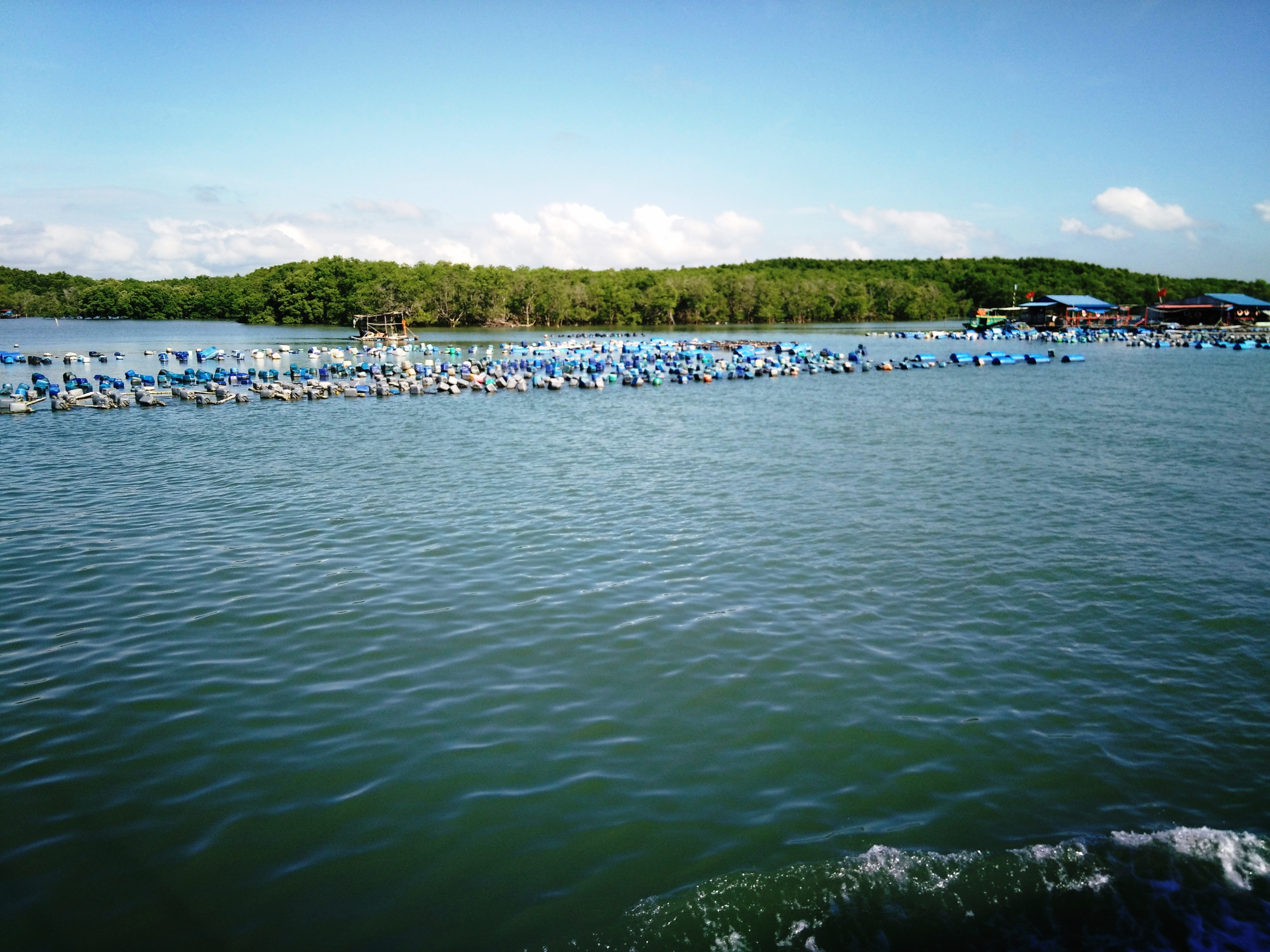
Thạnh An island commune and fishing village

The Cần Giờ mangrove forest spanning over 75,000 hectares, is considered the "green lung" and wave barrier protecting Ho Chi Minh City. However, the balance between the ecosystem and the livelihoods of the local people is now seriously threatened by mega-urban projects, most notably Vingroup's land reclamation project. According to Mongabay, specific impacts include:

- Loss of a thousand-year-old livelihood: Hundreds of households engaged in clam harvesting and shrimp farming on the 30/4 beach are facing the risk of losing everything. According to an article on Mongabay, the experimental fencing and sand filling, although still on a small scale, has altered tidal currents, causing a significant decrease in clam catches. One resident shared heartbreakingly: "If the resort is built, we will lose all our livelihoods."
- The Dangers of Land Reclamation: To build a super-luxury "ecological city" with skyscrapers and golf courses, scientists have sent a letter of warning to the government. The project requires a huge amount of sand extracted from rivers. This excessive sand mining will push the Mekong Delta and Can Gio itself into a more serious subsidence scenario, altering natural river flows and destroying mangrove forests.
- Pressures on the Ecosystem: Besides the real estate project, Cần Giờ is also facing the serious risk of erosion from large container ships passing through the rivers in this area, plus waste from the sudden increase in tourism.

Otherwise, environmental experts warned on Mongabay that: "Before considering economic benefits, we need to ask whether we should build permanent structures on land that is at risk of subsidence and could disappear within the next few decades?".

== See also ==
- Cần Giờ Mangrove Forest
- Vũng Tàu Port
