= Phú Mỹ =

Phú Mỹ may refer to several other places in Vietnam, including:

- Phú Mỹ, Ho Chi Minh City, a ward of Ho Chi Minh City
- Phú Mỹ, Cà Mau, a commune of Cà Mau province
- Phú Mỹ, District 7, a ward of District 7, Ho Chi Minh City
- Phú Mỹ (city), former provincial city of former Bà Rịa–Vũng Tàu province which was incorporated with Ho Chi Minh City
- Phú Mỹ, Bình Dương, a ward of Thủ Dầu Một
- Phú Mỹ (ward of Phú Mỹ town), a ward of Phú Mỹ town
- Phú Mỹ, An Giang, a township and capital of Phú Tân District, An Giang Province
- Phú Mỹ, Kiên Giang, a commune of Giang Thành District
- Phú Mỹ, Bến Tre, a commune of Mỏ Cày Bắc District
- Phú Mỹ, Sóc Trăng, a commune of Mỹ Tú District
- Phú Mỹ, Phú Thọ, a commune of Phù Ninh District, Phú Thọ
- Phú Mỹ, Thừa Thiên–Huế, a commune of Phú Vang District
- Phú Mỹ, Tiền Giang, a commune of Tân Phước District
- Phú Mỹ Bridge, a bridge over the Saigon River in Ho Chi Minh City

== See also ==
- Phù Mỹ district, a rural district of Bình Định province
- Phù Mỹ, a township and capital of Phù Mỹ district
