= Phú Mỹ (city) =

Coordinates: 10°34′50″N 107°05′06″E

Phú Mỹ Thành phố Phú Mỹ
- Provincial city (Class-3)
- Phú Mỹ City
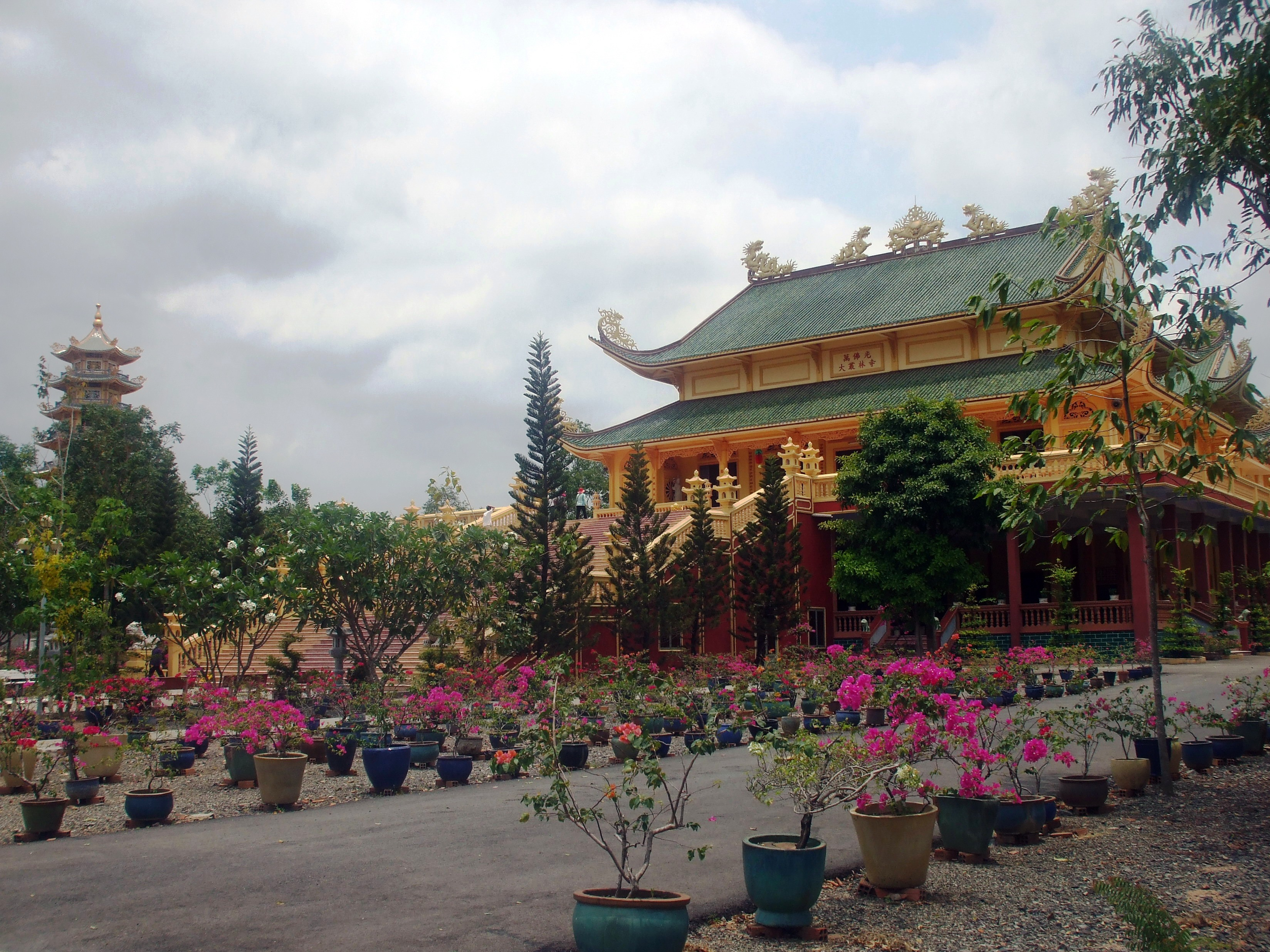
- Đại Tòng Lâm Temple
- Nickname: Port city of the Southern
- /0/queryThe property query is required; /0/idsThe property ids is required; /0Failed to match at least one schema; /0/titleThe property title is required; /0/serviceDoes not have a value in the enumeration ["page"]; /0Failed to match exactly one schema; /0/geometriesThe property geometries is required; /0/typeDoes not have a value in the enumeration ["GeometryCollection"]; /0/typeDoes not have a value in the enumeration ["MultiPolygon"]; /0/typeDoes not have a value in the enumeration ["Point"]; /0/typeDoes not have a value in the enumeration ["MultiPoint"]; /0/typeDoes not have a value in the enumeration ["LineString"]; /0/typeDoes not have a value in the enumeration ["MultiLineString"]; /0/typeDoes not have a value in the enumeration ["Polygon"]; /0/coordinatesThe property coordinates is required; /0/geometryThe property geometry is required; /0/typeDoes not have a value in the enumeration ["Feature"]; /0/featuresThe property features is required; /0/typeDoes not have a value in the enumeration ["FeatureCollection"]; Interactive map outlining Phú Mỹ
- Country: Vietnam
- Region: Southeast
- Province: Bà Rịa–Vũng Tàu
- Provincial city: March 1, 2025
- Capital: Phú Mỹ

Area
  - Provincial city (Class-3): 128.90 sq mi (333.84 km^{2})
  - Urban: 94.03 sq mi (243.53 km^{2})

Population (2024)
  - Provincial city (Class-3): 287,055
  - Density: 2,227.0/sq mi (859.86/km^{2})
  - Urban: 267,294
  - Urban density: 2,842.7/sq mi (1,097.6/km^{2})
- Time zone: UTC+7 (ICT)
- Postal code: 787xx

Phú Mỹ was a provincial city (thành phố thuộc tỉnh) of Bà Rịa–Vũng Tàu province in southeast Vietnam. As of 2018 the city had a population of 175,872. The city covers an area of 333.84 km^{2} (128.90 sq mi).

Phú Mỹ was formerly Tân Thành District, a rural district of the province, with its district capital lying at Phú Mỹ township. In 2018, Tân Thành District was dissolved to form the new district-level town then city of Phú Mỹ.

The city seat lies at Phú Mỹ ward (former Phú Mỹ township) from which it takes its name. Phú Mỹ is a highly industrialized town with several industrial parks. It is the site of CS Wind's largest Vietnam wind tower factory.

Phú Mỹ is home to deep water ports of Cái Mép–Thị Vải replacing Saigon Port when the latter relocated here. Phú Mỹ Power Plant Complex with a total capacity of 4,000 MW contributes nearly 35% of Vietnam's electricity.

== History ==
=== Etymology ===
The town takes its name from the Phú Mỹ township, the capital of former Tân Thành District. The township was formally a commune and a village established in 1934 from the merger of Phú Thạnh and Mỹ Xuân, two villages founded in the area in the 19th century.

=== Before Vietnamese settlement ===
Archaeological evidence shows that modern humans had lived in Phú Mỹ in prehistory. In 2004, scientists conducted excavations in Gò Cây Me, an earthen hill in Tân Hòa Commune, and found relics of stony work tools, pottery and bones. The found relics were said to date back to the early metallic age circa 3500-3000 years before present.

Between the 1st and 7th century, this area was controlled by the ancient Funan Kingdom. Later it was annexed by Chenla and administered as part of Chenla until the 17th century.

=== Vietnamese settlement ===
Due to conflicts and disturbance caused by the Trịnh-Nguyễn War, climate extremes, failing crops and factionism, Vietnamese people from the Central region migrated south, settled on Southeast and Southern region today. Many arrived in Mô Xoài (present-day Bà Rịa-Vũng Tàu) and established the earliest villages in the area.

In 1698, Lord Nguyễn Phúc Chu launched a military expedition to Southern region led by Nguyễn Hữu Cảnh.

== Port of Phú Mỹ ==
The Port of Phú Mỹ (pronounced foo-me) is a port cluster on Cái Mép–Thị Vải river, with the main eponymous piers, and the river flow into South China Sea (Vietnamese: Biển Đông) at the Gành Rái Gulf, it serves as the main deep water cargo port for Ho Chi Minh City metropolitan area, as well as for the resort town of Vũng Tàu. The port is 65 km from Ho Chi Minh City and 45 km from Vũng Tàu city.

== Administrative divisions ==
The city is divided administratively into ten commune-level subdivisions with the first seven are wards, and the three latter are communes:

- Hắc Dịch
- Mỹ Xuân
- Phú Mỹ
- Phước Hoà
- Tân Hải
- Tân Hòa
- Tân Phước
- Châu Pha
- Sông Xoài
- Tóc Tiên
