= Tân Phước, Ho Chi Minh City =

Tân Phước Phường Tân Phước Phước Hòa
- Ward
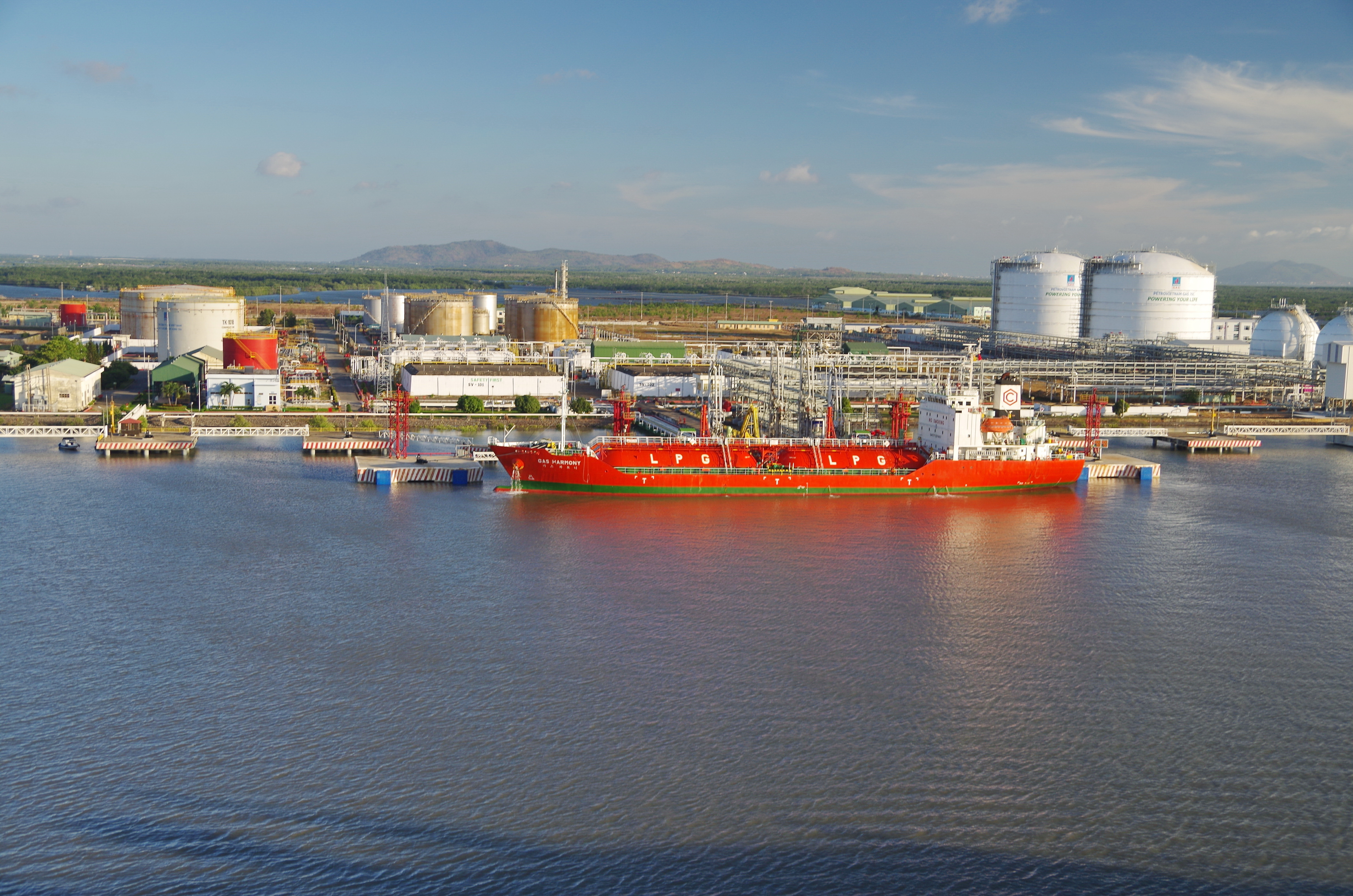
- Port of Cái Mép
- Interactive map of Tân Phước
- Coordinates: 10°33′30″N 107°03′30″E
- Country: Vietnam
- Municipality: Ho Chi Minh City
- Established: June 16, 2025

Area
  - Total: 32.29 sq mi (83.62 km^{2})

Population (2024)
  - Total: 29,363
  - Density: 909.5/sq mi (351.1/km^{2})
- Time zone: UTC+07:00 (Indochina Time)
- Administrative code: 26713

Tân Phước (Vietnamese: Phường Tân Phước) is a ward of Ho Chi Minh City, Vietnam. It is one of the 168 new wards, communes and special zones of the city following the reorganization in 2025.

== Geography ==
Tân Phước is located south of Ho Chi Minh City, formerly part of Bà Rịa–Vũng Tàu province. The ward is located on the route from Saigon to Bà Rịa, about 60 kilometers southeast of Saigon, and has the following geographical location:

- To the north, it borders Phú Mỹ ward
- To the east, it borders Châu Pha commune
- To the south, it borders Tân Hải ward
- To the southwest, it borders Gành Rái Bay
- To the west, it borders Thạnh An commune with Thị Vải River as the boundary.

According to Official Dispatch No. 2896/BNV-CQĐP dated May 27, 2025 of the Ministry of Home Affairs, following the merger, Tân Phước has a land area of 83.62 km², the population as of December 31, 2024 is 29,363 people, the population density is 351 people/km².

== History ==
On December 9, 2003, the Government issued Decree No. 152/2003/ND-CP on the establishment of Tan Phuoc commune in Tan Thanh district based on the adjustment of 2,933.12 hectares of natural area and 7,399 people of Phuoc Hoa commune.

On April 12, 2018, the Standing Committee of the National Assembly issued Resolution No. 492/NQ-UBTVQH14 on:

Establishing Phu My town in Ba Ria - Vung Tau province based on the entire Tan Thanh district.

Establishing Tan Phuoc ward in Phu My town based on the entire 29.75 km² of natural area and 15,182 people of Tan Phuoc commune.

On January 15, 2025, the Standing Committee of the National Assembly issued Resolution No. 1365/NQ-UBTVQH15 on the establishment of wards in Phu My town and the establishment of Phu My city in Ba Ria - Vung Tau province (the resolution takes effect from March 1, 2025). Accordingly, Phu My city in Ba Ria - Vung Tau province is established on the basis of the entire Phu My town. Tan Phuoc ward is under Phu My city.

On June 12, 2025, the Standing Committee of the National Assembly issued Resolution No. 1685/NQ-UBTVQH15 on the arrangement of commune-level administrative units of Ho Chi Minh City. Accordingly, the entire natural area and population size of Phuoc Hoa ward and Tan Phuoc ward of Phu My city in Ba Ria - Vung Tau province were formerly a new ward named Tan Phuoc ward (Clause 110, Article 1).
