= Phú Mỹ Power Plants =

Power generation complex located in Vietnam

Phú Mỹ 1
- Country: Vietnam
- Location: Phú Mỹ, Ho Chi Minh City
- Coordinates: 10°36′20″N 107°02′12″E
- Status: Operational
- Construction began: 1998
- Commission date: 2000
- Owner: Vietnam Electricity

Thermal power station
- Primary fuel: Natural gas
- Combined cycle?: Yes
- Cogeneration?: Yes

Power generation
- Units operational: 3
- Nameplate capacity: 1,090 MW

Phú Mỹ 2–1
- Country: Vietnam
- Coordinates: 10°36′04″N 107°02′12″E
- Status: Operational
- Construction began: 1995
- Commission date: 1997
- Owner: Vietnam Electricity

Thermal power station
- Primary fuel: Natural gas
- Combined cycle?: Yes

Power generation
- Units operational: 6
- Nameplate capacity: 900 MW

Phú Mỹ 2–2
- Country: Vietnam
- Coordinates: 10°36′11″N 107°02′15″E
- Status: Operational
- Construction began: 2001
- Commission date: 2005
- Owners: Électricité de France; Sumitomo; Tokyo Electric Power Company
- Operator: Mekong Energy Limited

Thermal power station
- Primary fuel: Natural gas
- Combined cycle?: Yes

Power generation
- Units operational: 3
- Nameplate capacity: 715 MW

Phú Mỹ 3
- Country: Vietnam
- Coordinates: 10°35′51″N 107°02′07″E
- Status: Operational
- Construction began: 2001
- Commission date: 2004
- Owner: TNK-BP

Thermal power station
- Primary fuel: Natural gas
- Combined cycle?: Yes

Power generation
- Units operational: 3
- Nameplate capacity: 715 MW

Phú Mỹ 4
- Country: Vietnam
- Coordinates: 10°36′14″N 107°02′13″E
- Status: Operational
- Commission date: 2004
- Owner: Vietnam Electricity

Thermal power station
- Primary fuel: Natural gas
- Combined cycle?: Yes

Power generation
- Units operational: 3
- Nameplate capacity: 450 MW

Phú Mỹ Power Plants is a power generation complex located in Phú Mỹ ward, Ho Chi Minh City, Vietnam. The complex is located next to Thị Vải River. Its combined generation capacity is 3,900 MW providing about 40% of Vietnam's total electricity. The complex consist of Phú Mỹ 1, 2-1, 2-2, 3 and 4 power plants.

All power plants are fuelled by natural gas while standby fuel is distilled oil. Gas is supplied from Bạch Hổ oil field and Nam Con Son Basin's gas fields.

== Phú Mỹ 1 ==
The Phú Mỹ 1 power plant is a combined cycle plant operated by Vietnam Electricity. It is equipped by three gas turbines with output capacity of 240 MW each and with a steam turbine with output capacity of 360 MW. Its full capacity is 1,090 MW. Natural gas for the plant is supplied by Vietsovpetro.

Construction of Phú Mỹ 1 started in September 1998 and the plant was commissioned in May 2000. It was built by Mitsubishi Heavy Industries and cost US$530 million. 85% of costs was financed by Japan through Overseas Economic Co-operation Fund and 15% was financed by the Vietnamese government.

== Phú Mỹ 2–1 ==
Phú Mỹ 2–1 power plant is a 900 MW combined cycle power plant with six units. It is operated by Vietnam Electricity. Construction of the plant started in 1995 and it was commissioned in 1997. This time it was equipped with two 144 MW gas turbines and a 160 MW steam turbine. The extension was commissioned at the end of 2002 by Siemens. The World Bank financed extension through an IDA credit

== Phú Mỹ 2–2 ==
The Phú Mỹ 2–2 power plant is a 715 MW combined cycle power plant with two gas-fired turbines and an add-on steam turbine. The plant is operated by Mekong Energy Limited, a consortium of Électricité de France, Sumitomo and the Tokyo Electric Power Company. Natural gas for the plant is supplied by Petrovietnam. Produced electricity is sold to Vietnam Electricity.

Phú Mỹ 2–2 is implemented as a 20-year build–operate–transfer project. The tender was launched in October 1997 and the agreements were signed in September 2001. First electricity was produced in February 2005 and the plant was fully commissioned in October 2005. It cost $400 million. The World Bank provided a partial credit guarantee through IDA.

== Phú Mỹ 3 ==
The Phú Mỹ 3 is power plant is a 715 MW combined-cycle power plant with two 250 MW gas turbines and one 250 MW steam turbine. Generators were supplied and installed by Siemens. The build–operate–transfer licence was provided to BP Amoco in May 2001. The plant was fully commissioned in March 2004. The plant was operated by BP Global Power and currently is operated by Sembcorp.

The plant cost $412 million, consisting of a $309 million syndicated loan and $103 million of equity. The Asian Development Bank provided a $40 million loan and $32 million of political risk guarantees, Multilateral Investment Guarantee Agency provided $138 million of political risk guarantees, Japan Bank for International Cooperation provided a $99 million loan and Nippon Export and Investment Insurance provided additional political risk coverage. A $170 million loan was provided by the syndicate of Bank of Tokyo-Mitsubishi, Crédit Agricole Indosuez, Crédit Lyonnais, Fortis Bank, and Mizuho Corporate Bank.

In 2010, BP sold the plant together with its other assets in Vietnam to TNK-BP.

== Phú Mỹ 4 ==
The Phú Mỹ 4 is power plant is a 450 MW combined-cycle power plant with two gas turbines and one steam turbine. It is operated by Vietnam Electricity. It became operational in 2004.

The €238 million power plant was built by Alstom and Marubeni. The project management contractor was Jurong Engineering.
