= Vũng Tàu =

Ward in Ho Chi Minh City, Vietnam

Vũng Tàu Phường Vũng Tàu Thắng Nhì, Thắng Tam, Cap Saint-Jacques
- Ward
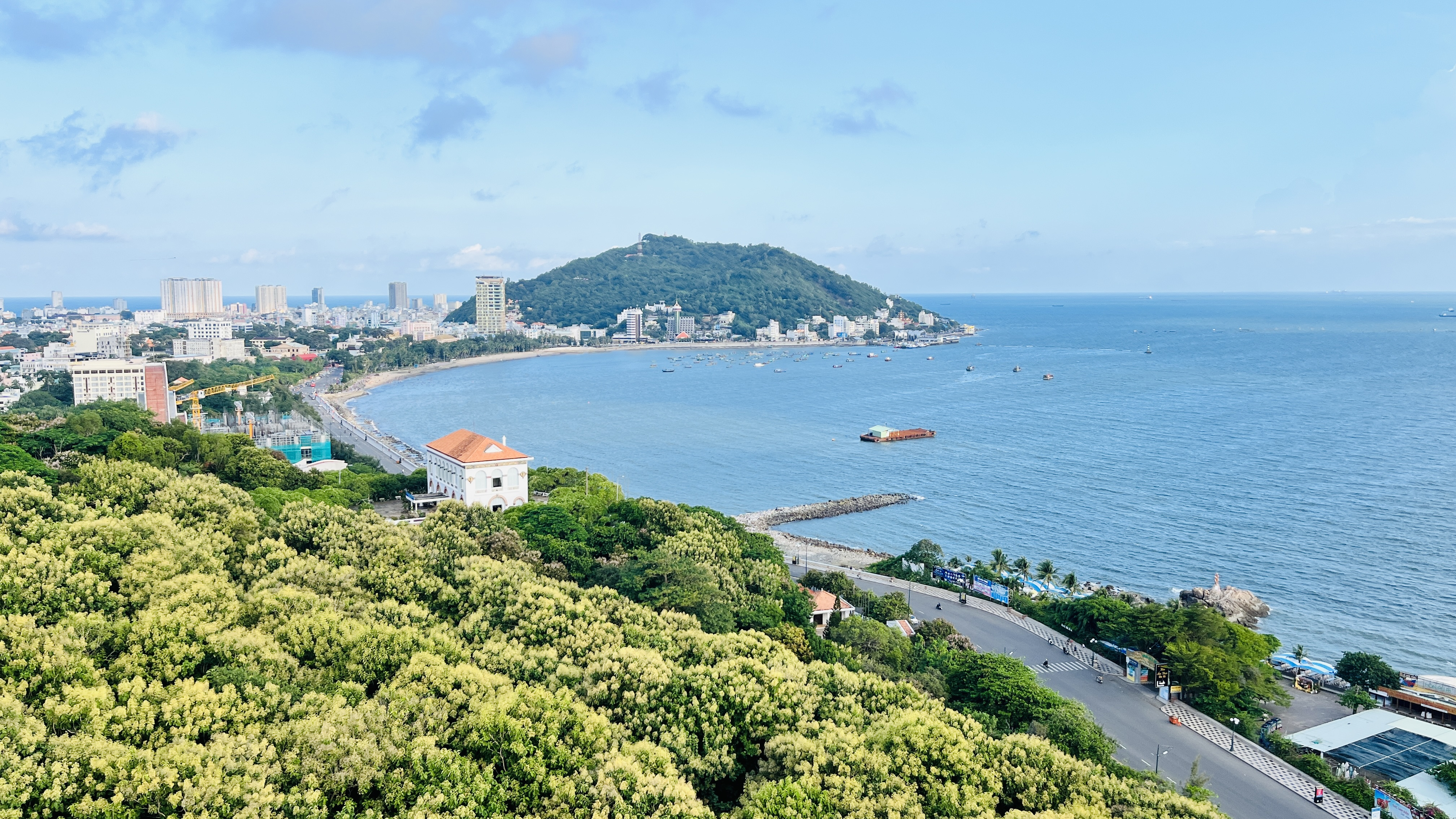
- Aerial view of Front Beach
- Nickname: Ô Cấp (au cap, lit. 'at the cape')
- Interactive map of Vũng Tàu
- Coordinates: 10°21′03″N 107°04′12″E
- Country: Vietnam
- Municipality: Ho Chi Minh City
- Established: June 16, 2025

Area
  - Total: 6.51 sq mi (16.86 km^{2})

Population (2024)
  - Total: 117,413
  - Density: 18,040/sq mi (6,964/km^{2})
- Time zone: UTC+07:00 (Indochina Time)
- Administrative code: 26506

Vũng Tàu (Vietnamese: Phường Vũng Tàu) is a ward of Ho Chi Minh City, Vietnam. It is one of the 168 new wards, communes and special zones of the city following the reorganization in 2025.

== Geography ==
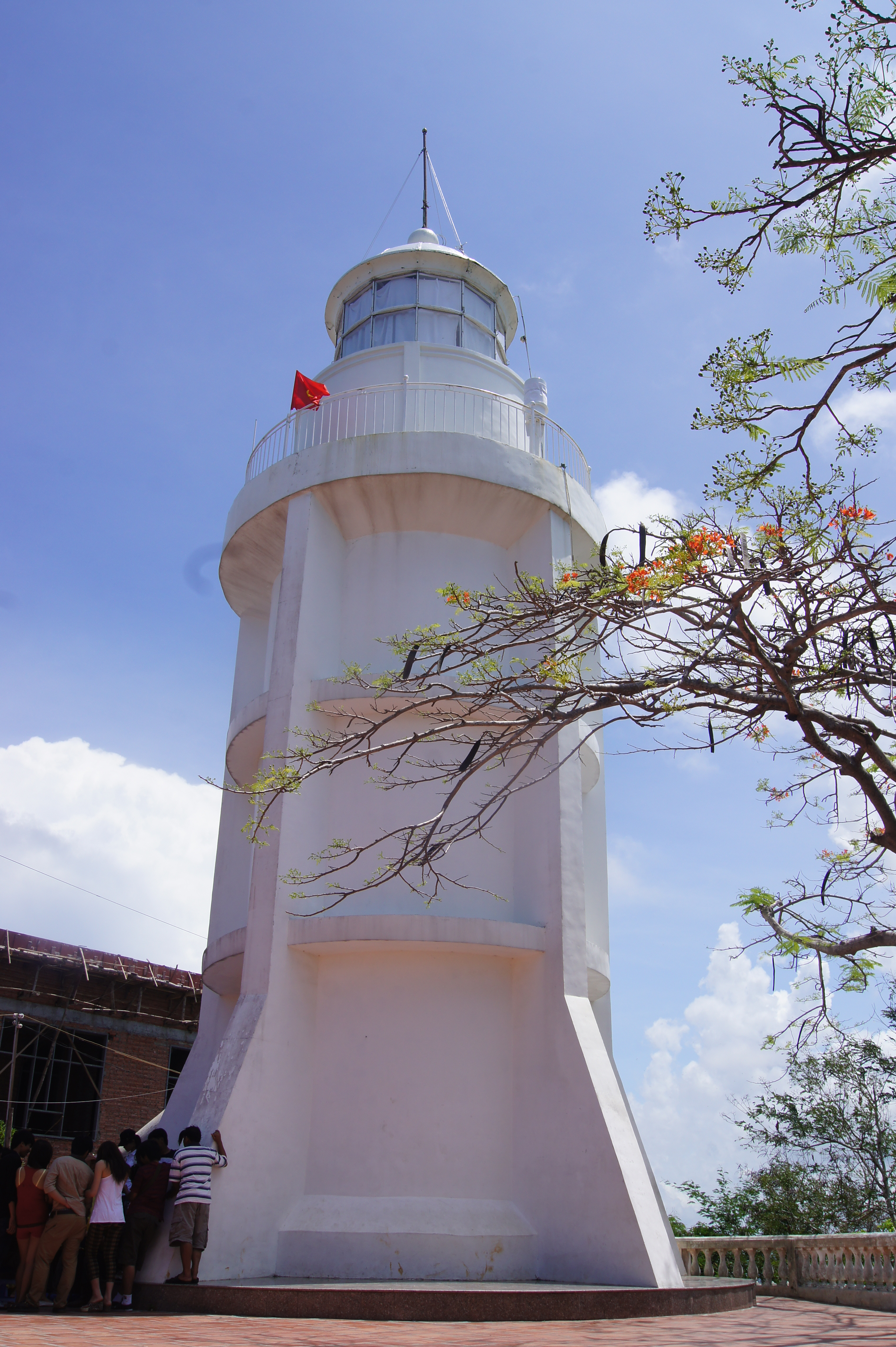
Vũng Tàu Lighthouse

Vũng Tàu ward is located on the southern coast of Ho Chi Minh City, at the tip of the Vũng Tàu peninsula. It is about 95 km Southeast of Saigon ward, about 25 km Southwest of Bà Rịa ward. Vũng Tàu is bordered by:

- Tam Thắng ward to the East,
- Gành Rái Bay to the north and west
- The South China Sea to the south.

The Nghinh Phong cape, formerly known as Cap Saint-Jacques by the French, is the southernmost point of Ho Chi Minh City’s mainland.

According to Official Dispatch No. 2896/BNV-CQĐP dated May 27, 2025 of the Ministry of Home Affairs, following the merger, Vũng Tàu has a land area of 16.86 km², the population as of December 31, 2024 is 117,413 people, the population density is 6,963 people/km².

== Etymology ==
In the 2025 administrative reorganization of communes, in order to commemorate and honor the ancestors who contributed to the development, preservation, and protection of the land of present-day Bà Rịa–Vũng Tàu area, the province in particular and Ho Chi Minh City in general have chosen new commune and ward names associated with famous tourist destinations, possessing long-standing historical and cultural elements, revolutionary lands such as Bà Rịa, Vũng Tàu, Đất Đỏ, and Hồ Tràm.

As Vũng Tàu ward corresponds to the historic downtown of the former city of Vũng Tàu (formerly known as Cap Saint-Jacques by the French), including the Front Beach, Strawberry Beach (Bãi Dâu), Pineapple Beach (Bãi Dứa), and part of Back Beach, Sao Mai Bến Đình quarter, also the Big Mount and Small Mount (Núi Lớn và Núi Nhỏ), it is responsible to bear the name of the former city.

== History ==
On June 16, 2025, the National Assembly Standing Committee issued Resolution No. 1685/NQ-UBTVQH15 on the arrangement of commune-level administrative units of Ho Chi Minh City in 2025 (effective from June 16, 2025). Accordingly, the entire land area and population of Ward 1, Ward 2, Ward 3, Ward 4, Ward 5, Thắng Nhì and Thắng Tam wards of the former Vũng Tàu city will be integrated into a new ward named Vũng Tàu (Clause 102, Article 1).

The seat of Vũng Tàu ward is located at the city hall of the former Vũng Tàu city.

== Administration ==
Vũng Tàu is divided into 42 neighborhoods, numbered from 1 to 42.

== Notable People ==
- Lý Nhã Kỳ

== Gallery ==
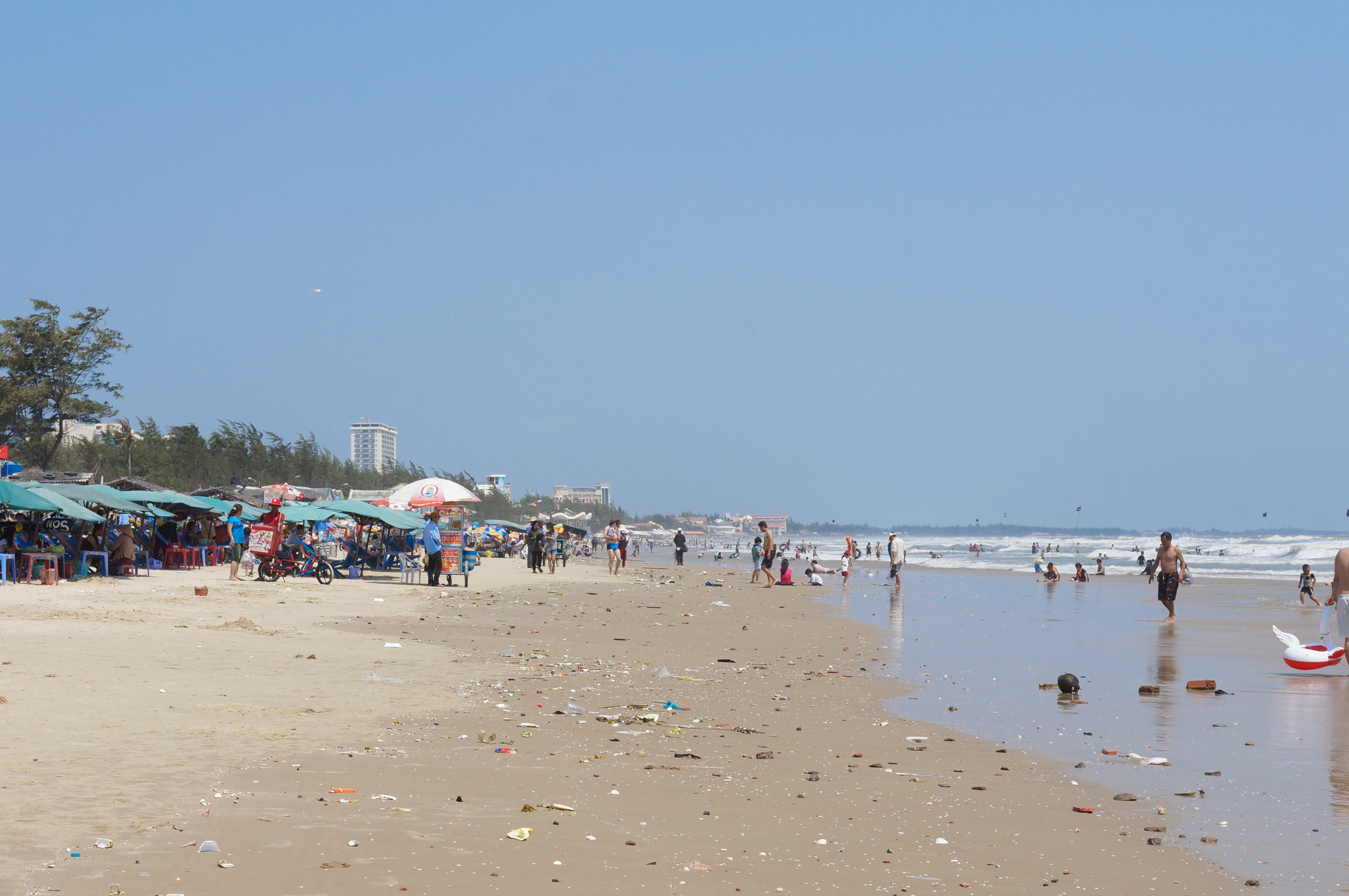
Back Beach (Bãi Sau)

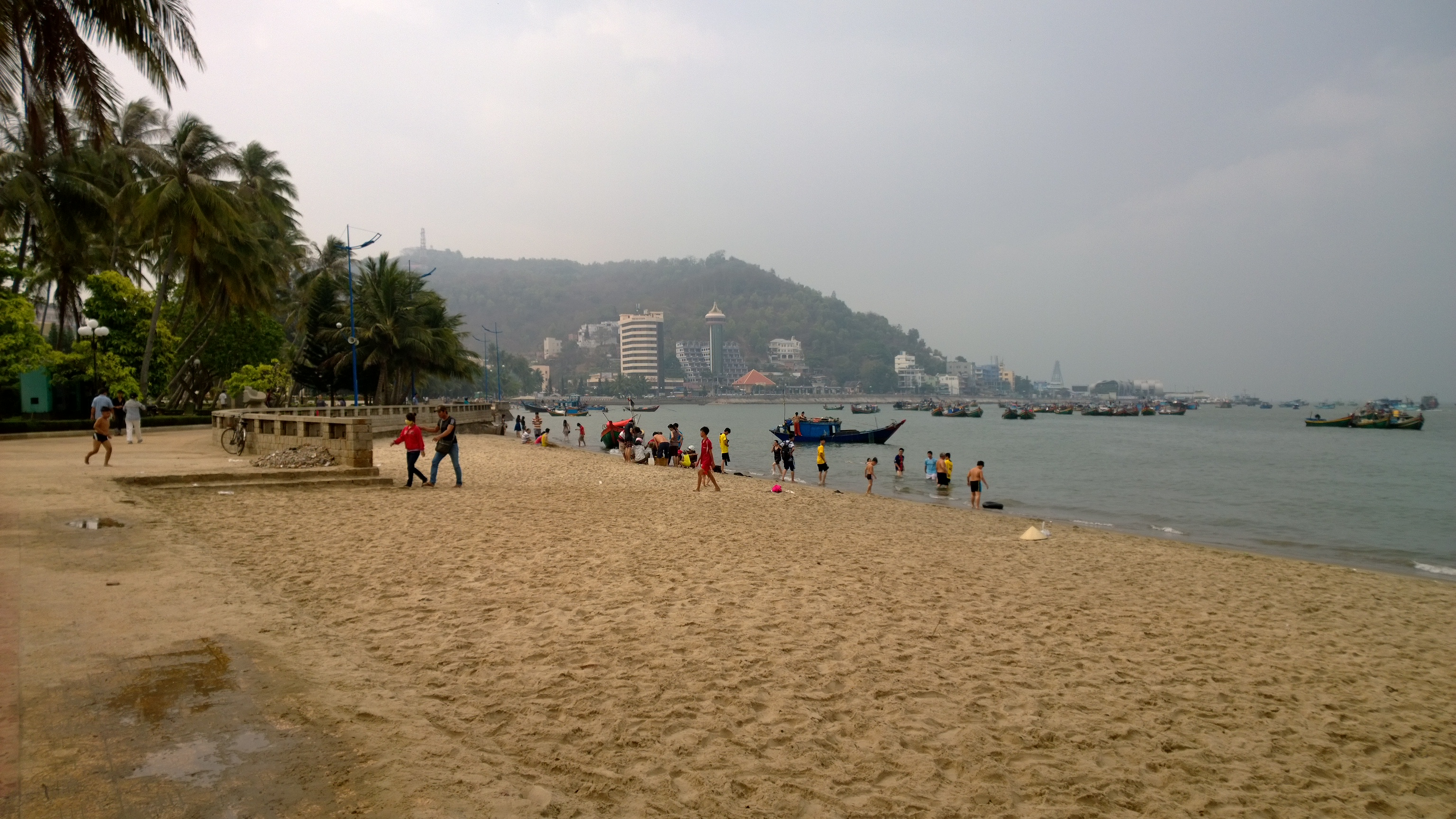
View of Front Beach (also known as Thùy Vân Beach)

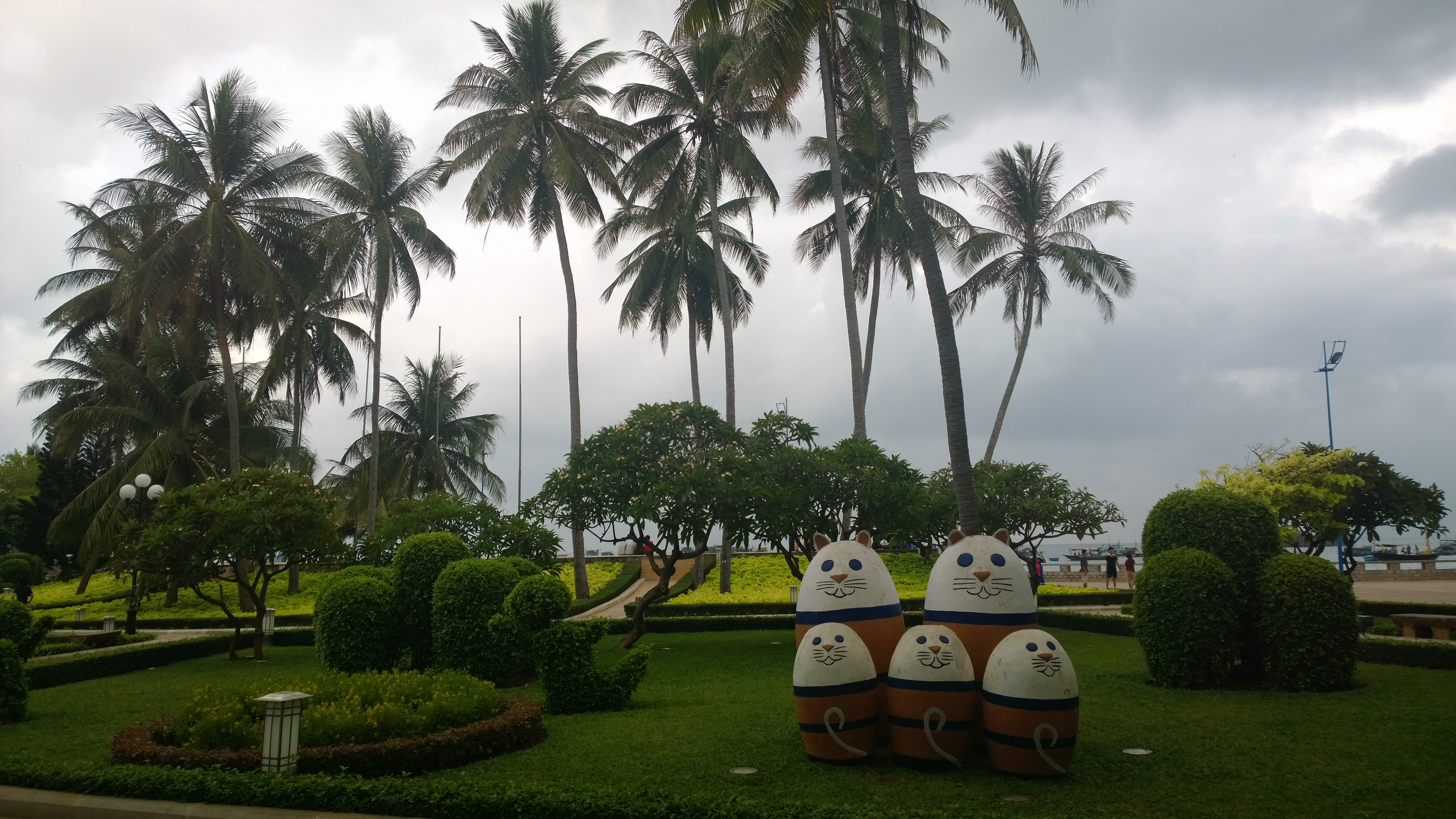
Front Beach Park

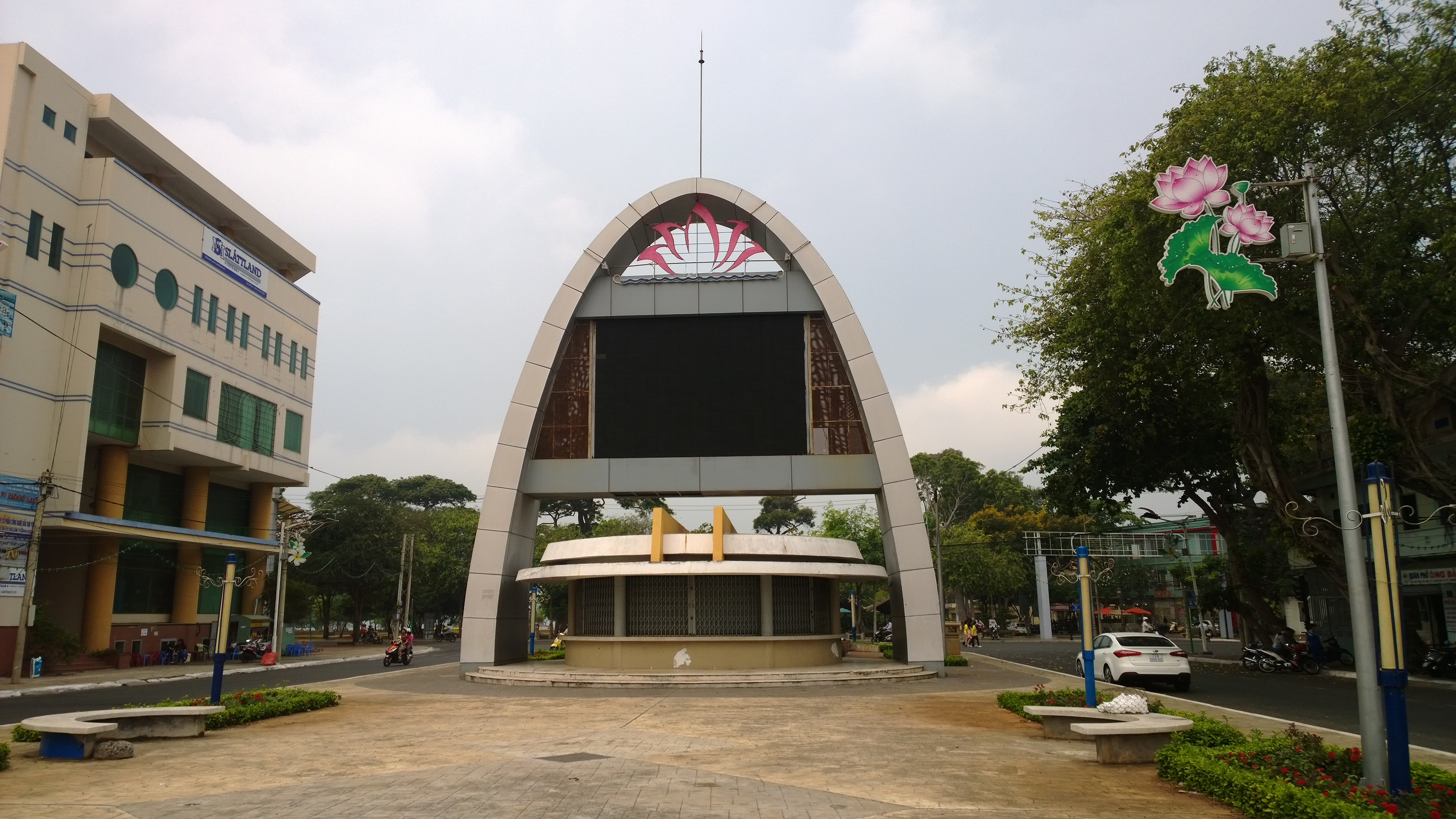
Park

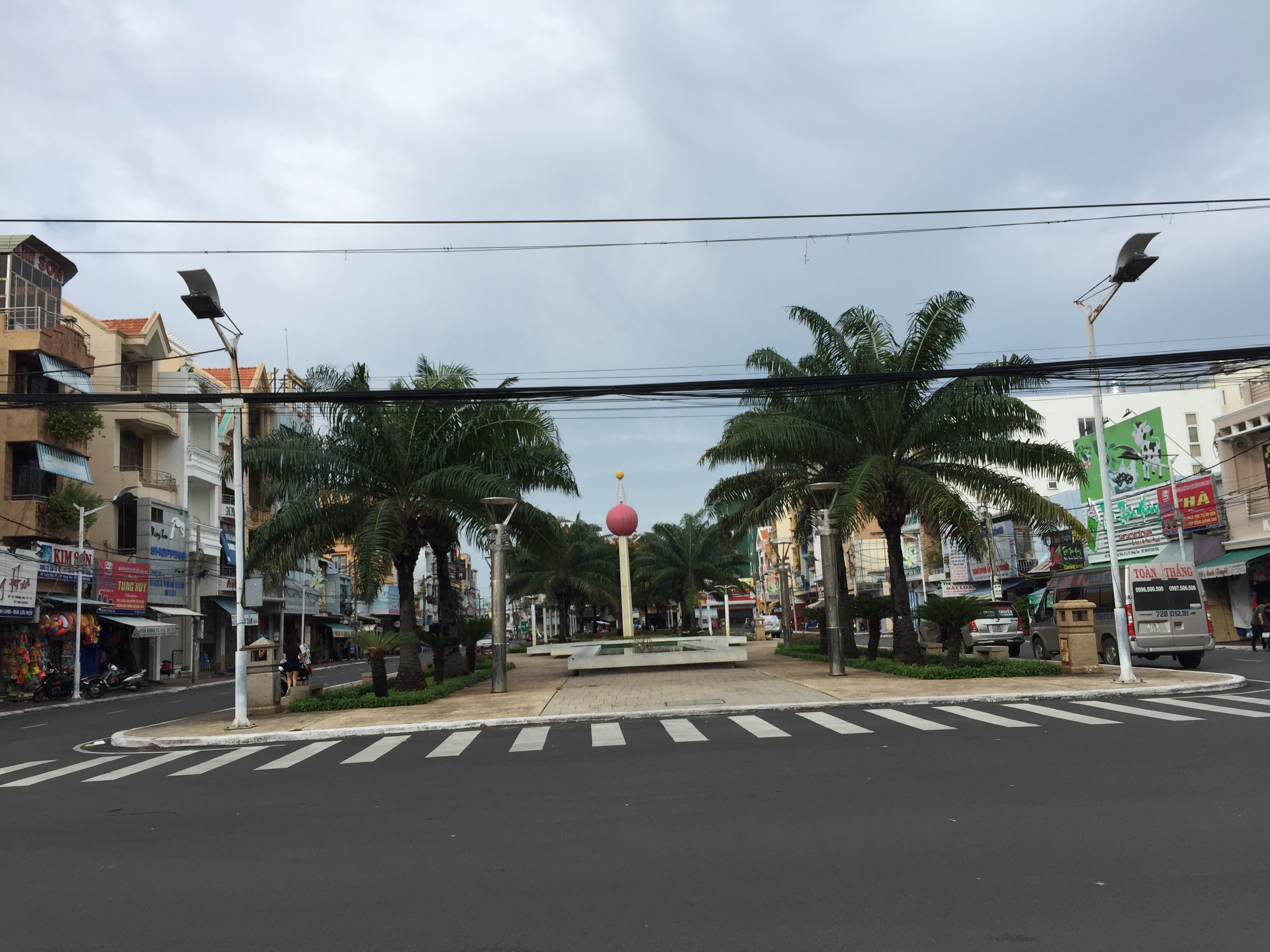

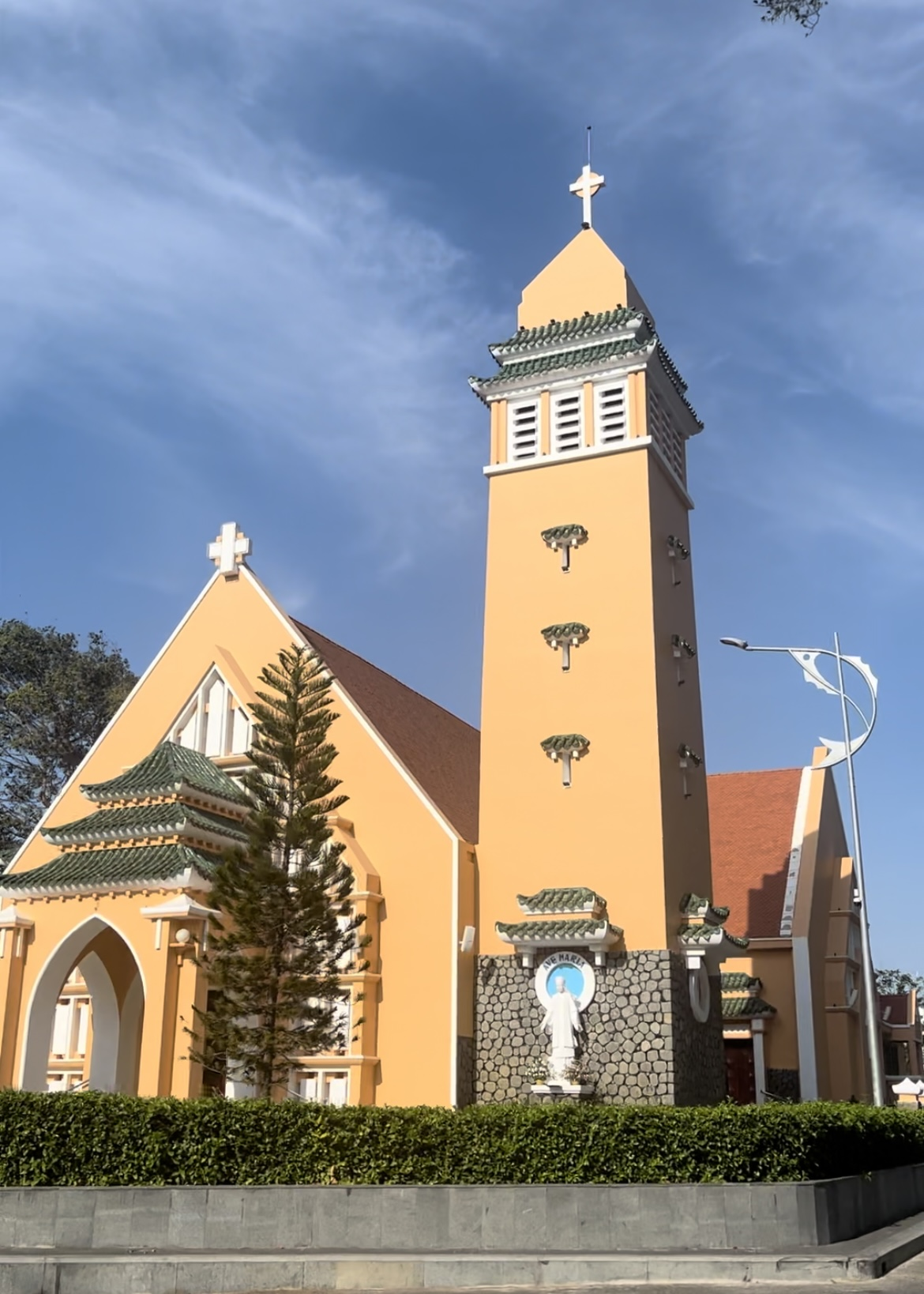
Vũng Tàu Church

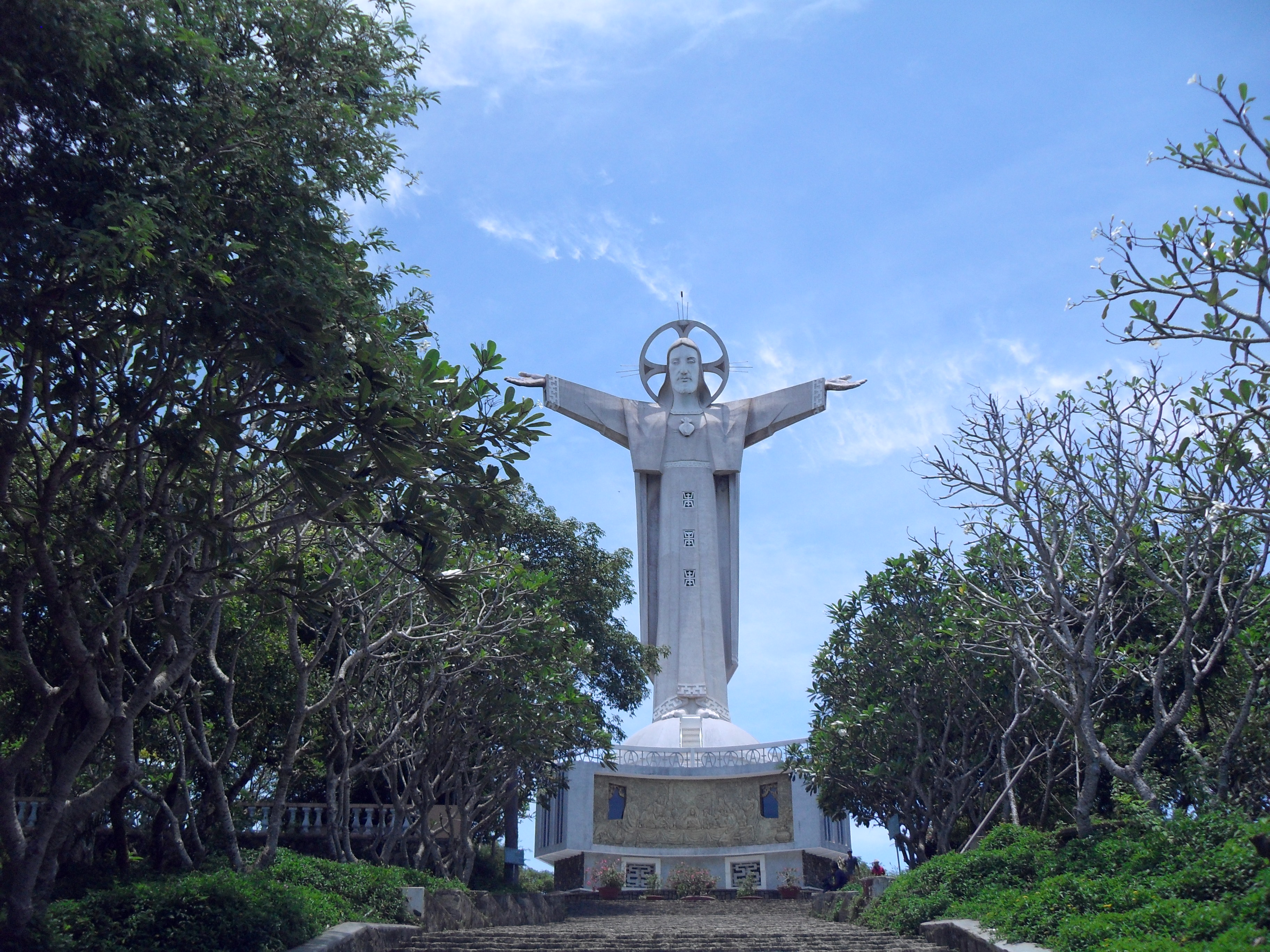
Christ of Vũng Tàu on Mount Nhỏ

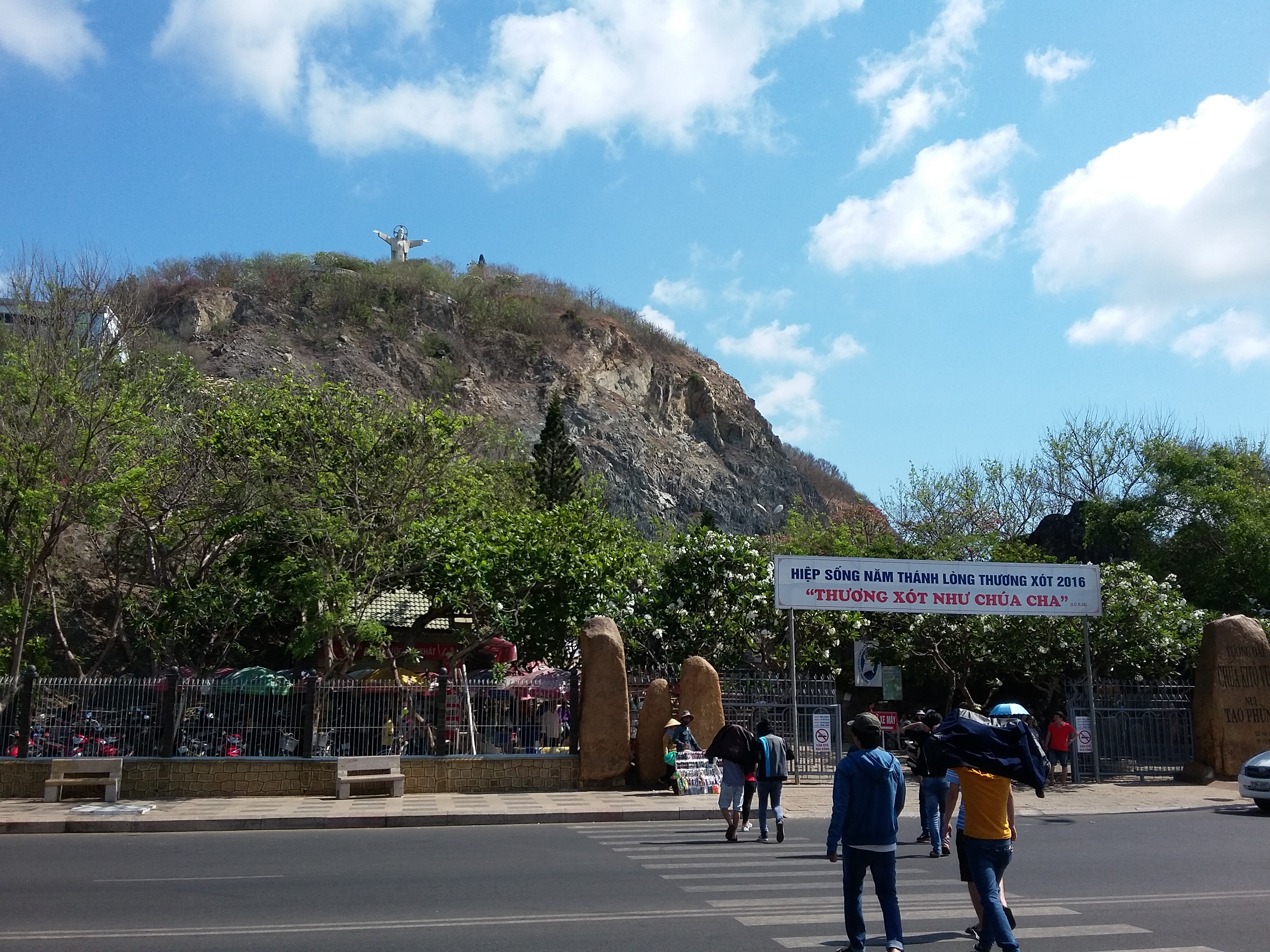
Road to Christ of Vũng Tàu

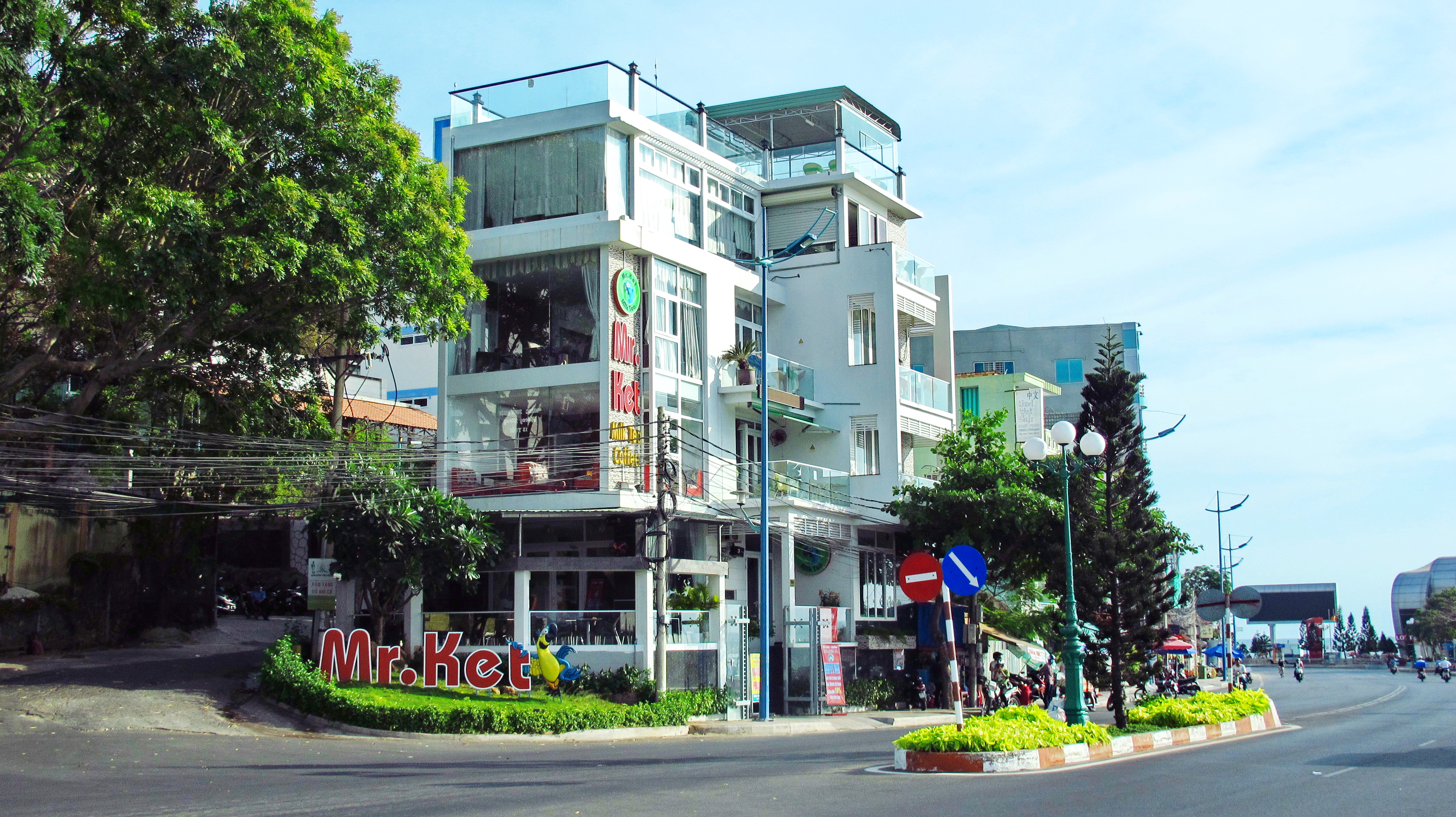
Corner of the ward

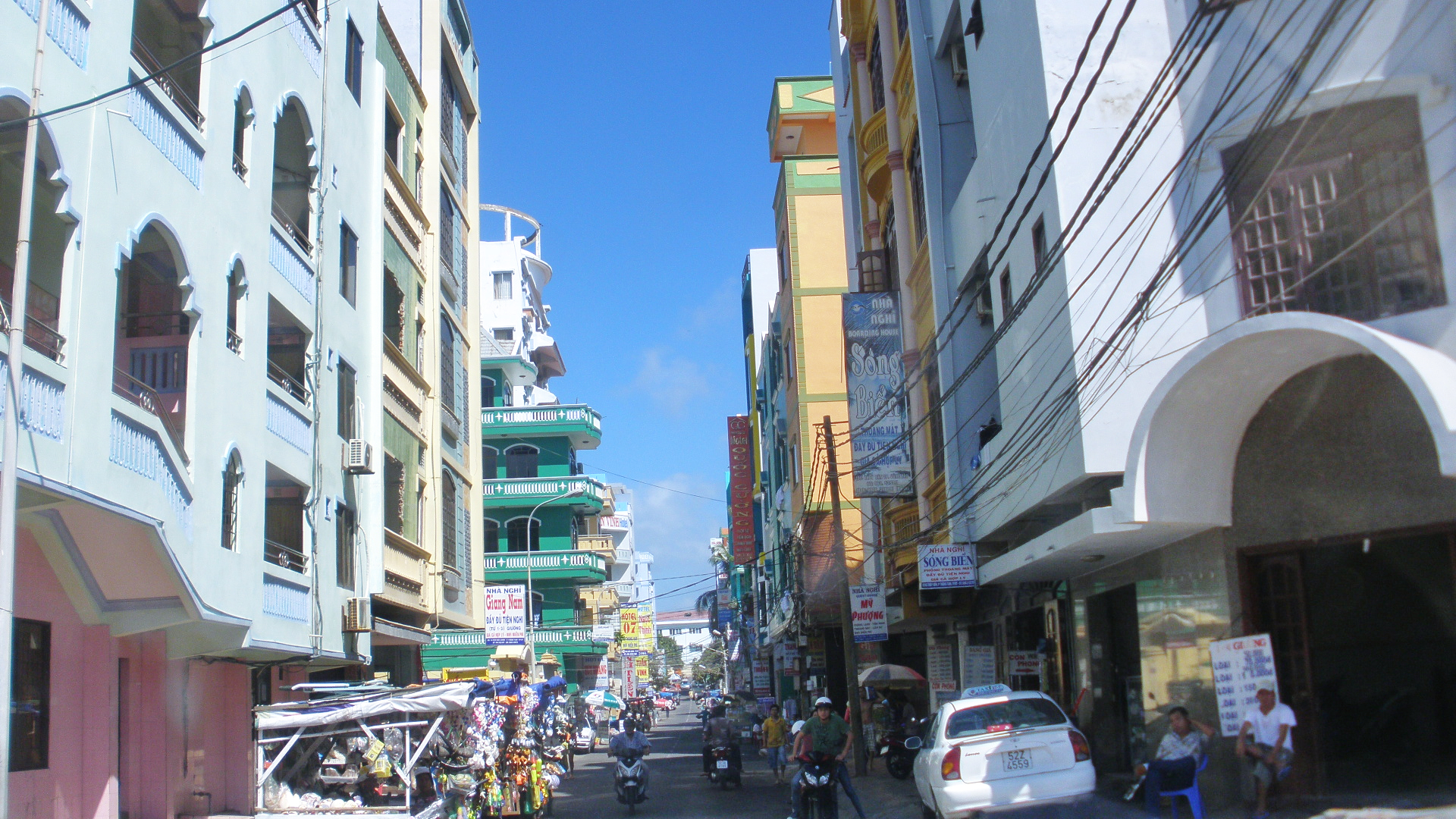
Row of motels on Phó Đức Chính Street

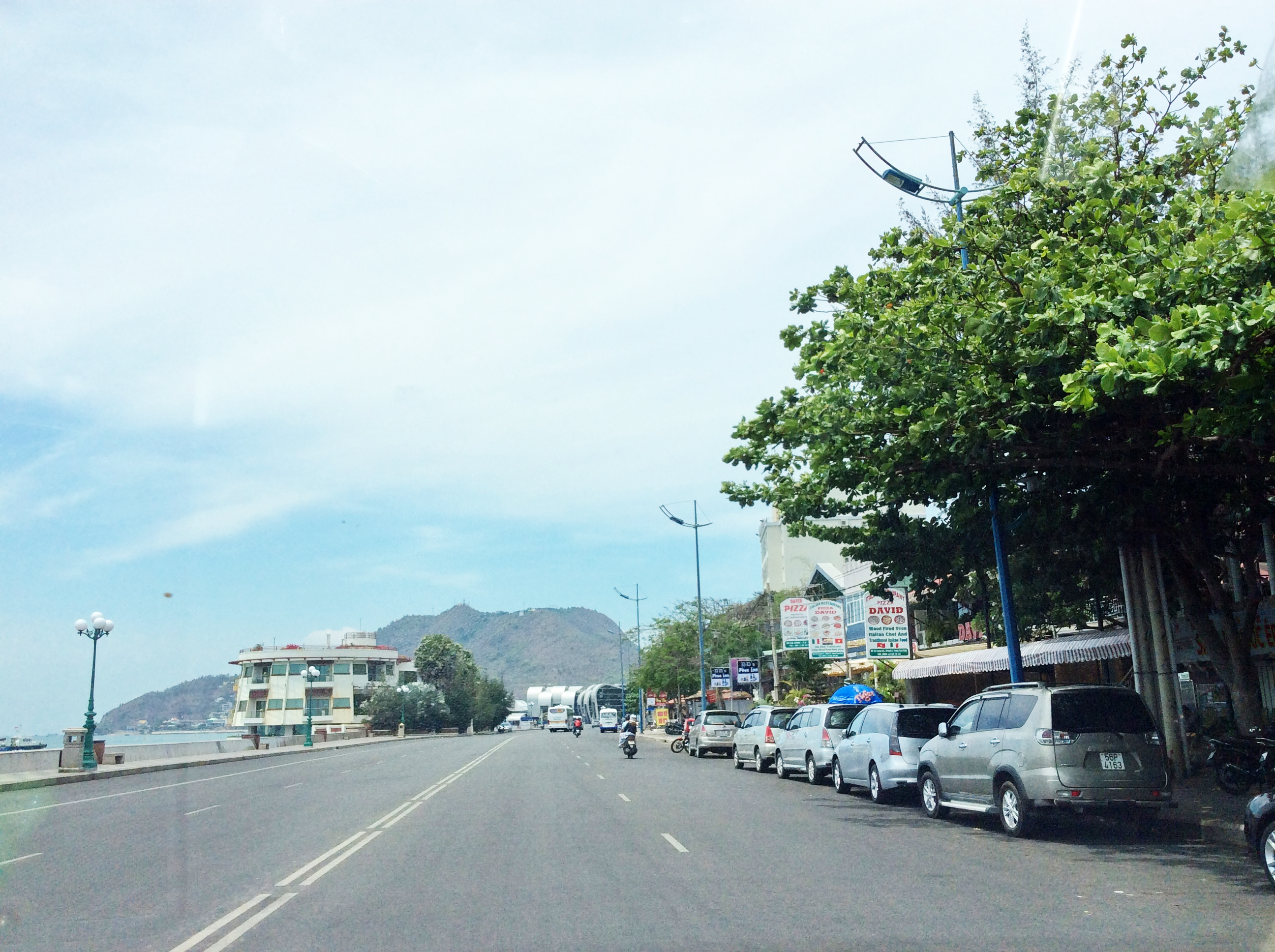
Hạ Long Street

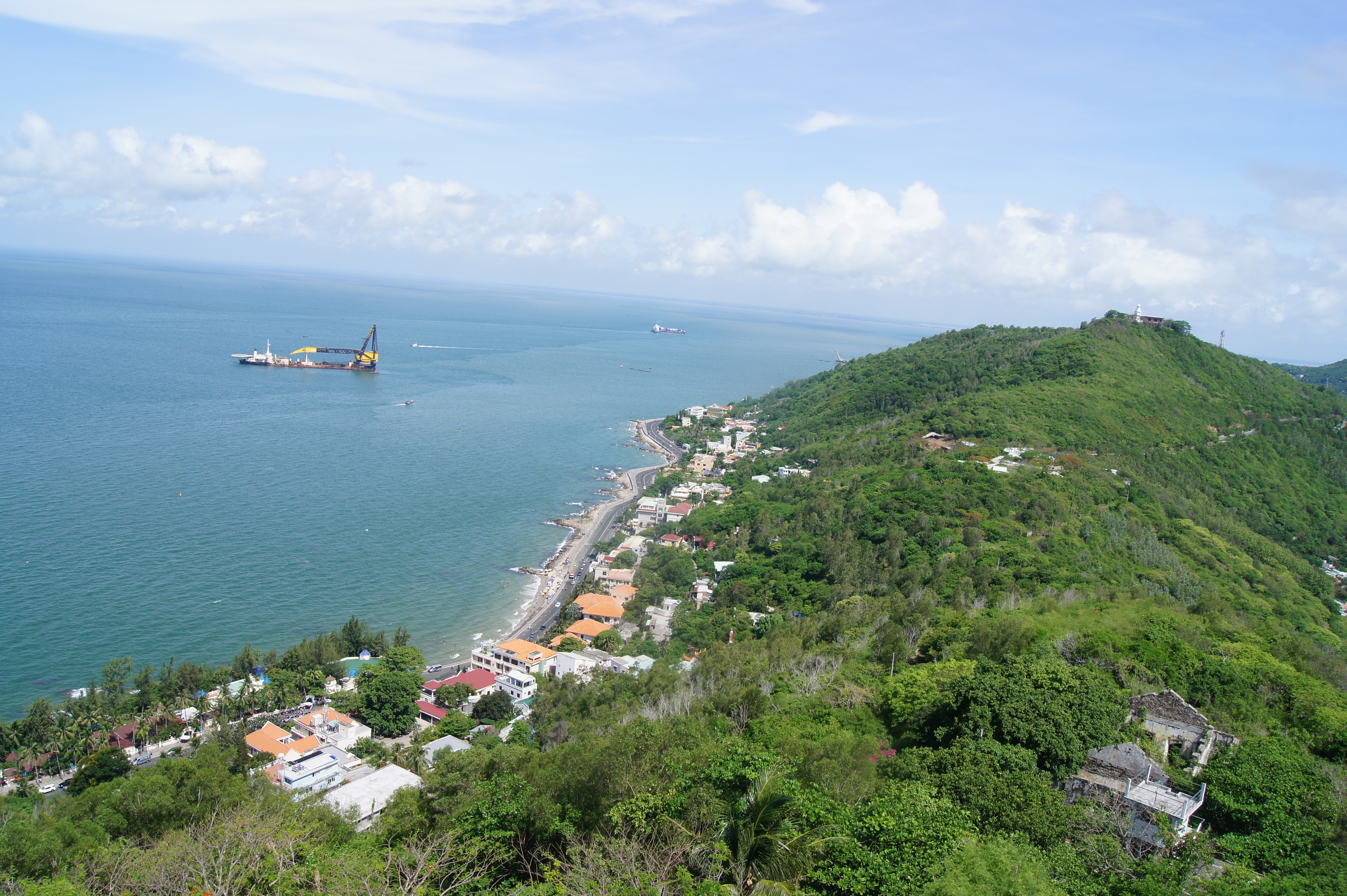
Vũng Tàu aerial view

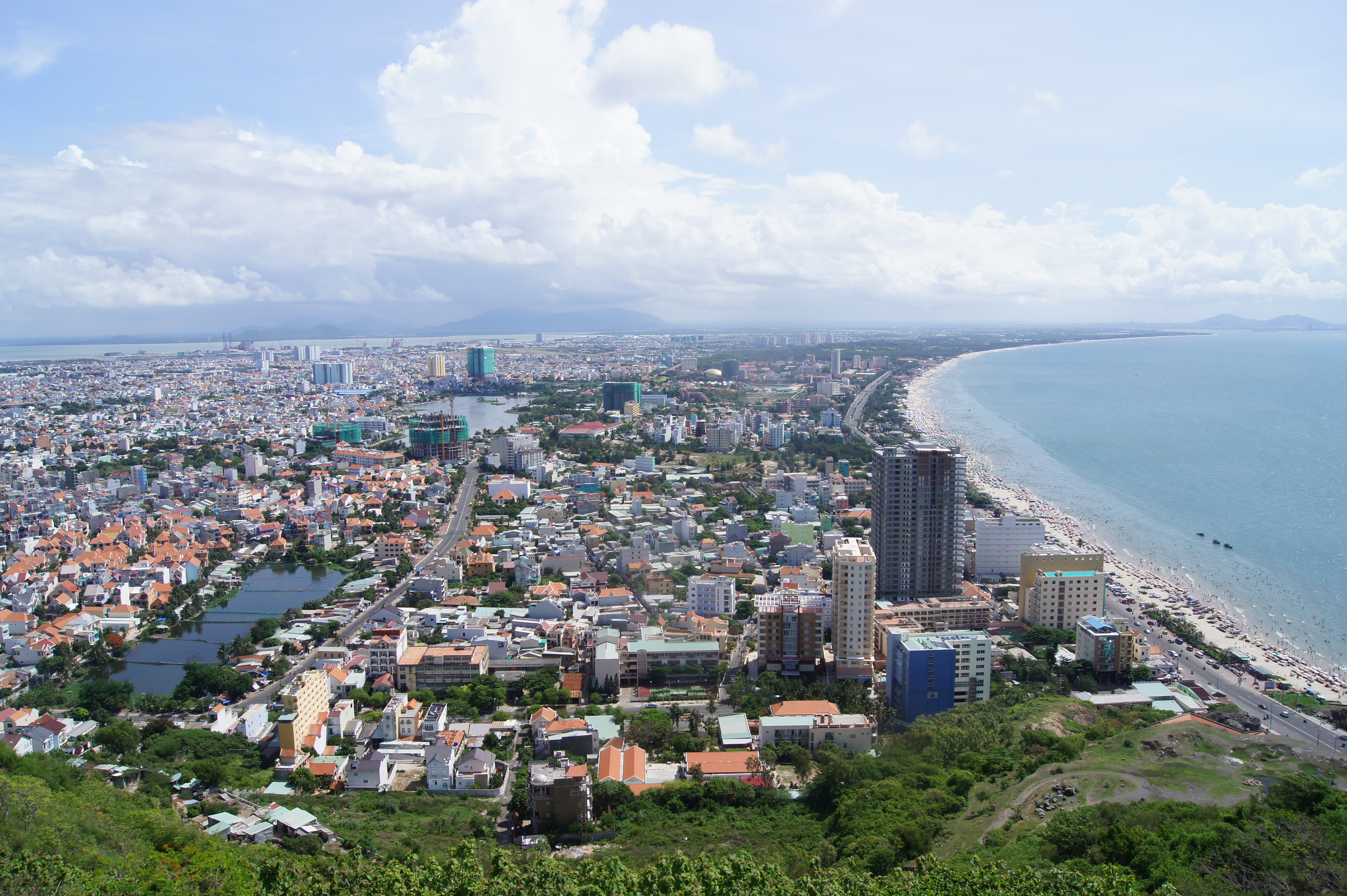
Vũng Tàu aerial view

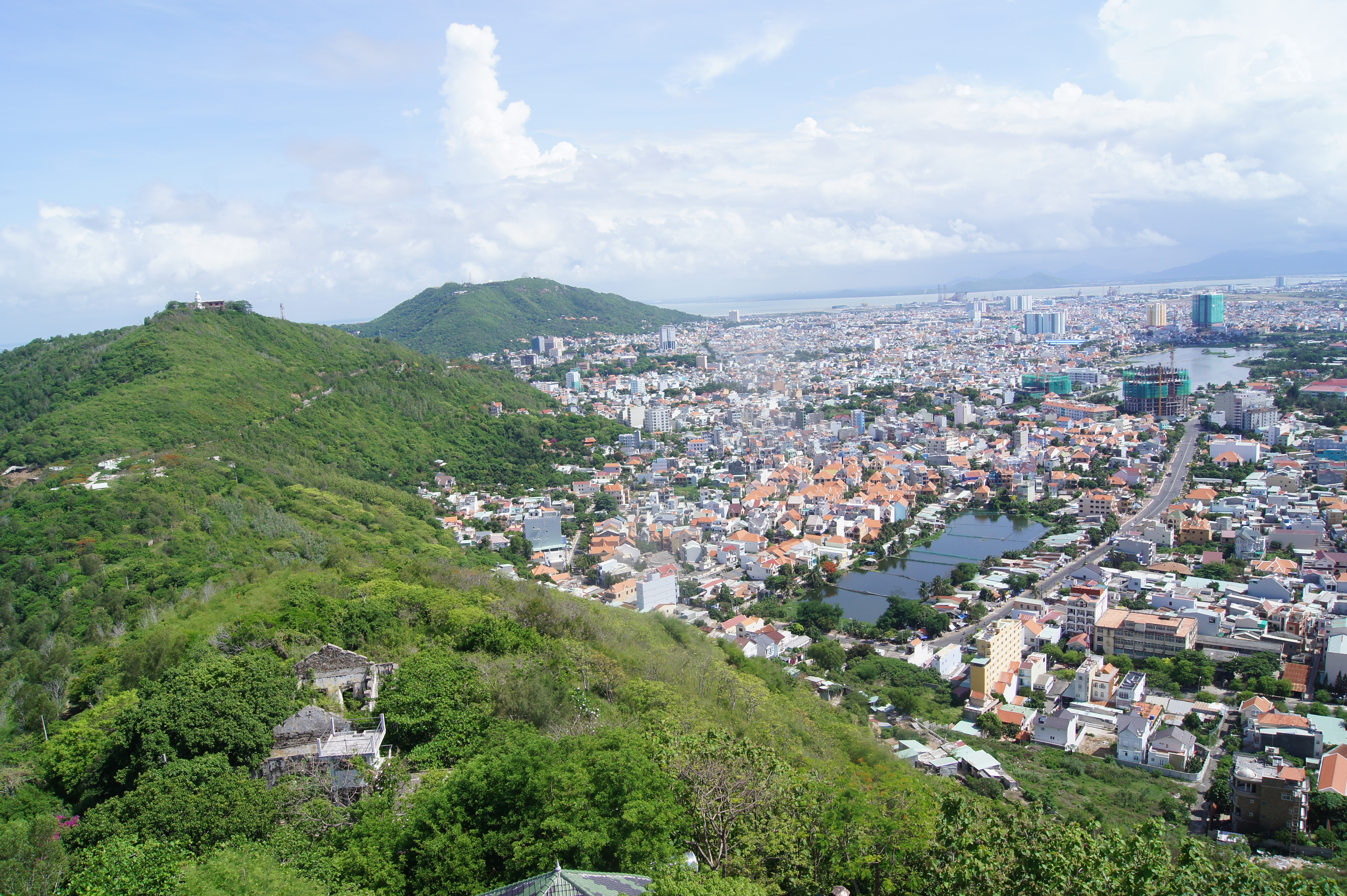
Vũng Tàu aerial view

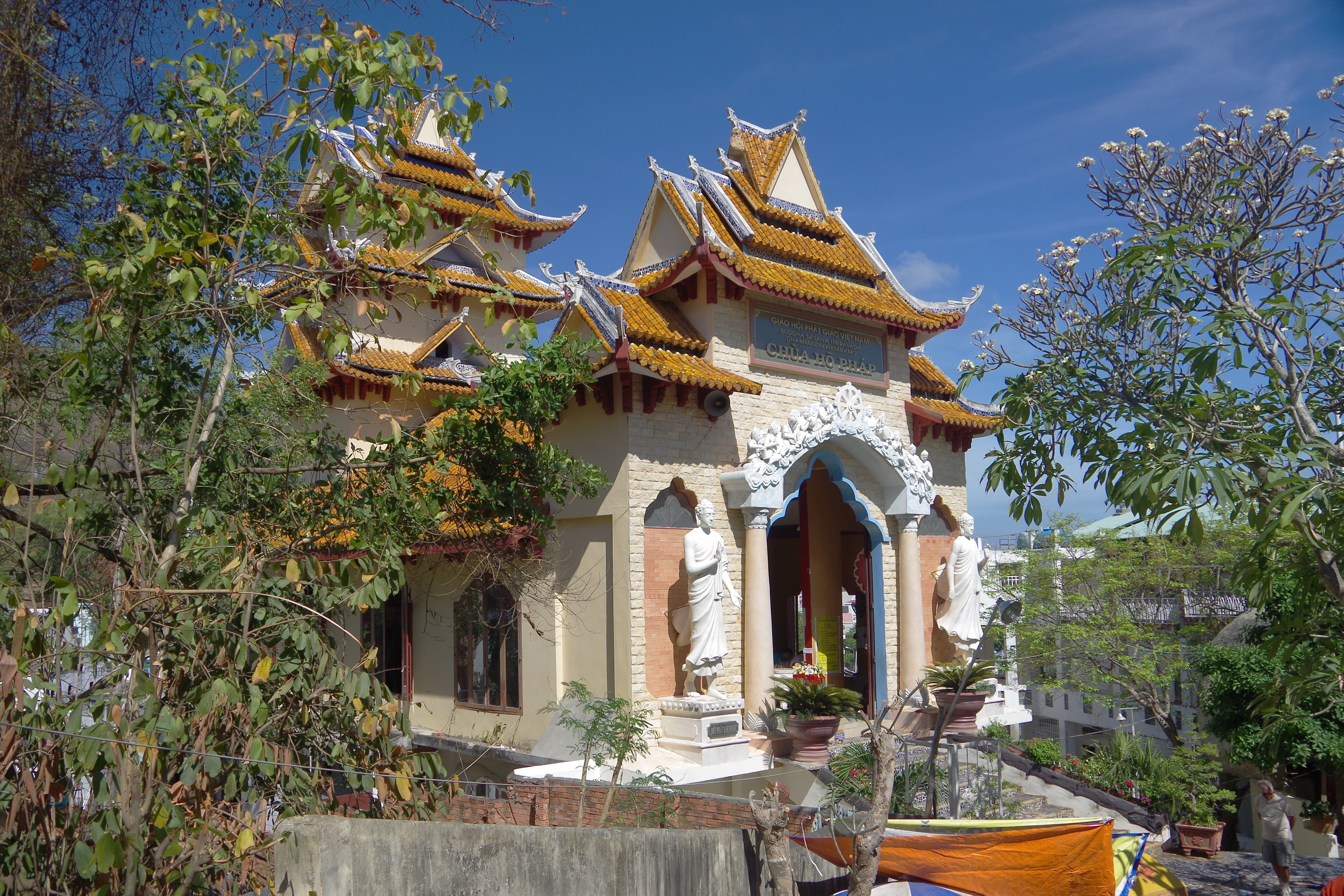
Hộ Pháp Pagoda of Thích Ca Phật Đài architects group

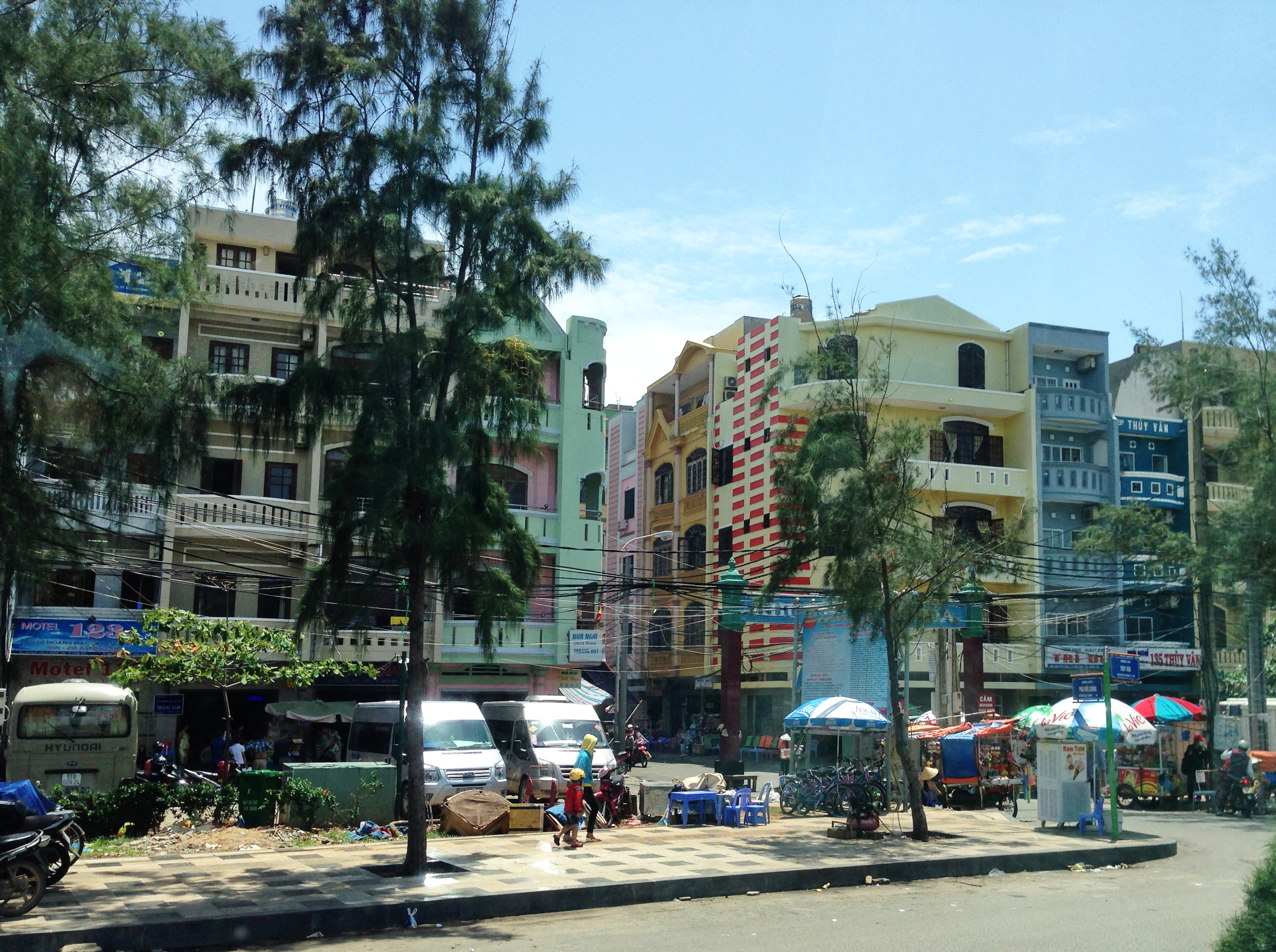
Thùy Vân Street

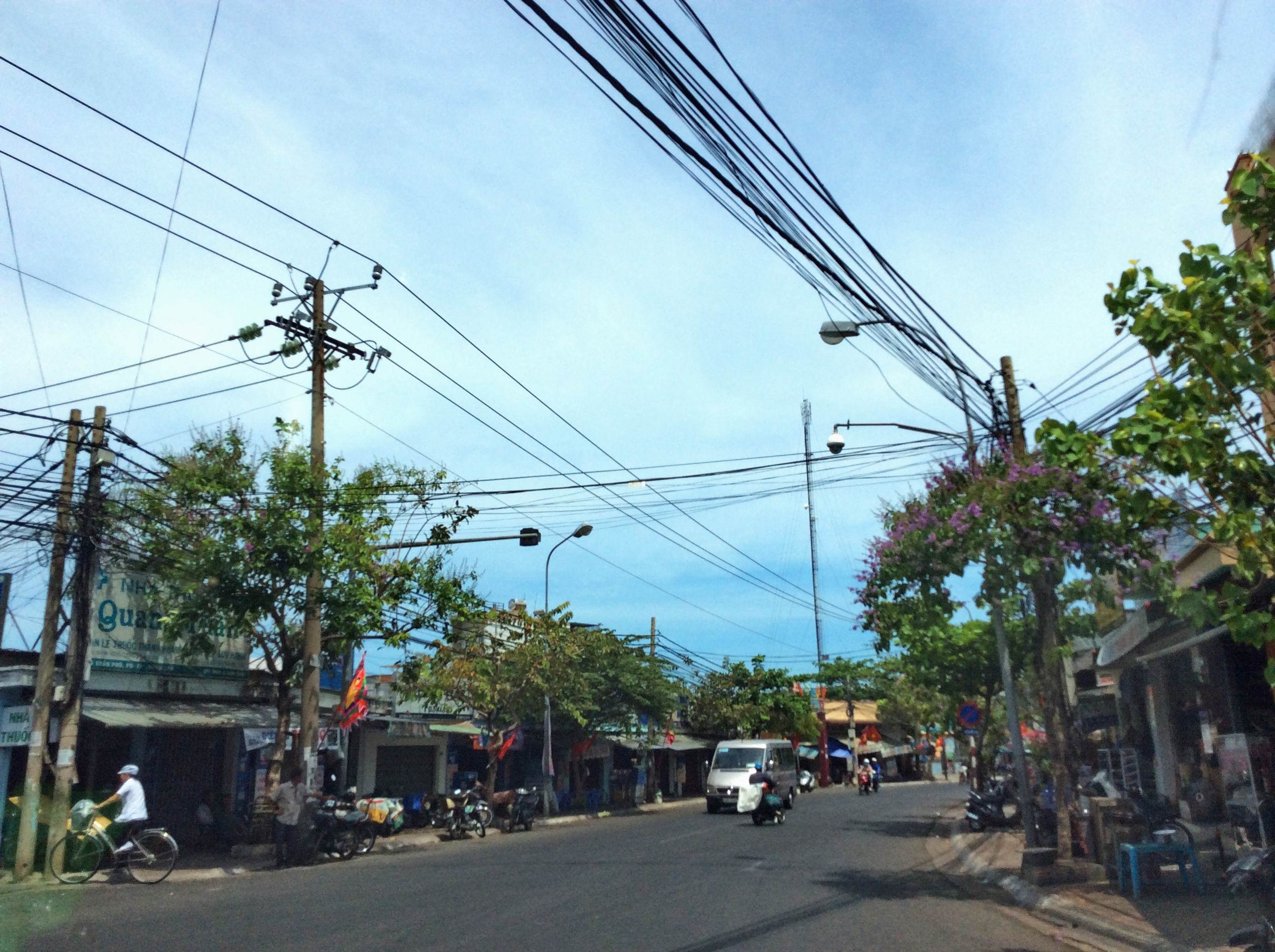
Trần Phú Road

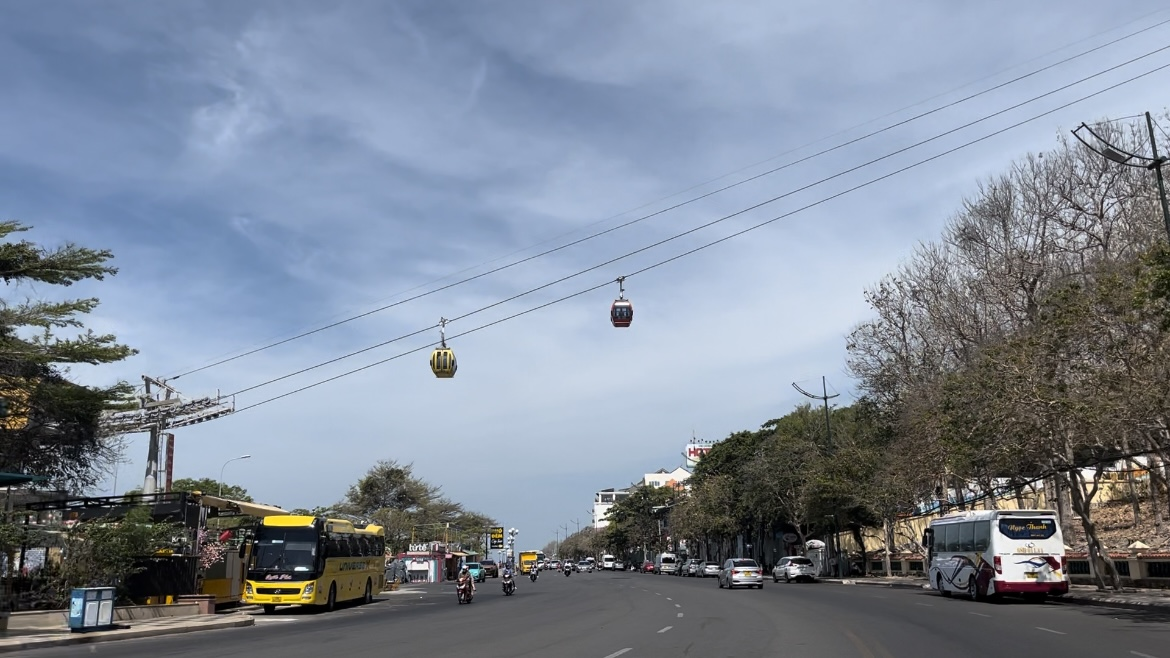
Aerial tramway in Vũng Tàu

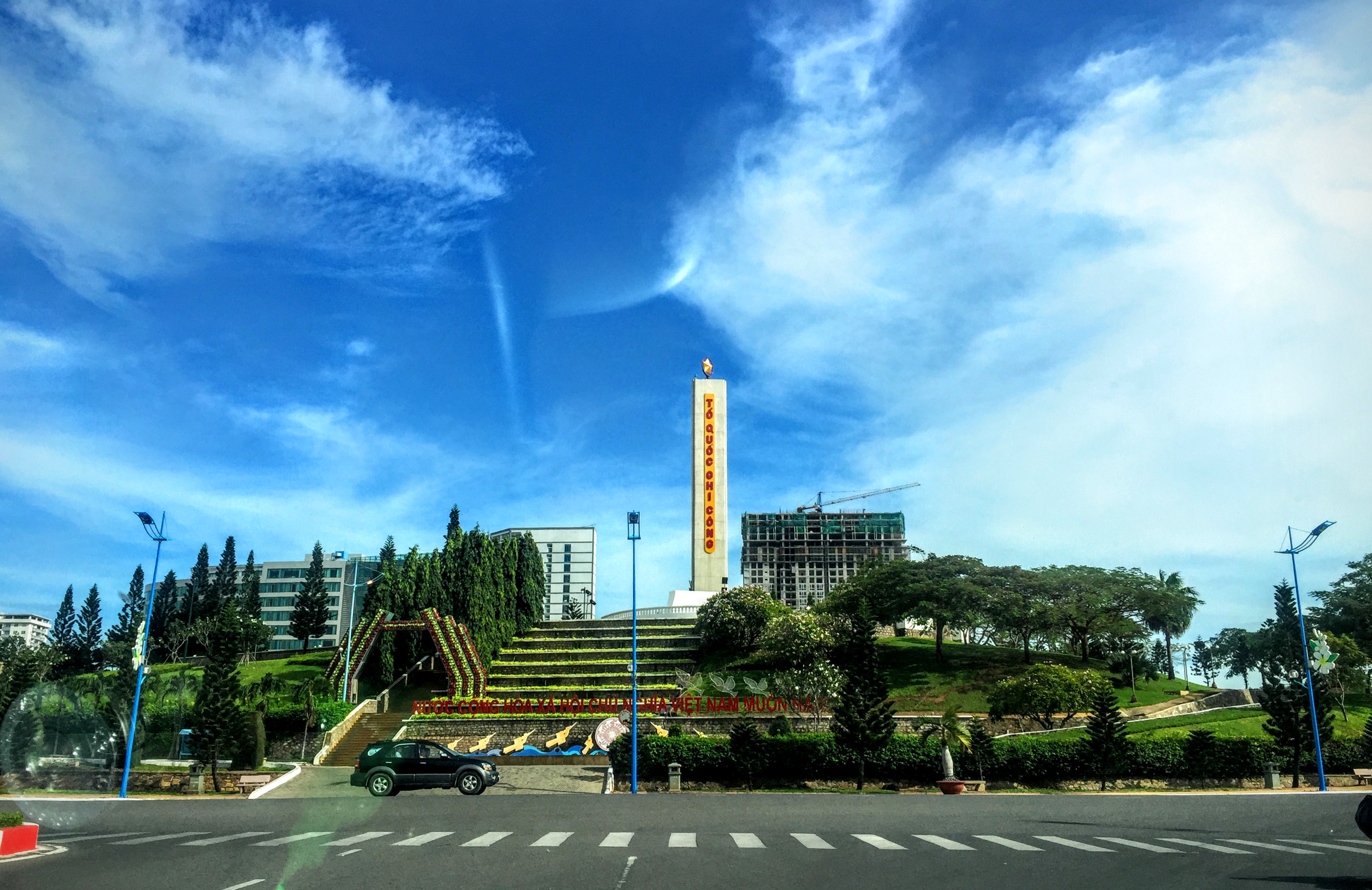
Vũng Tàu Martyrs' Monument

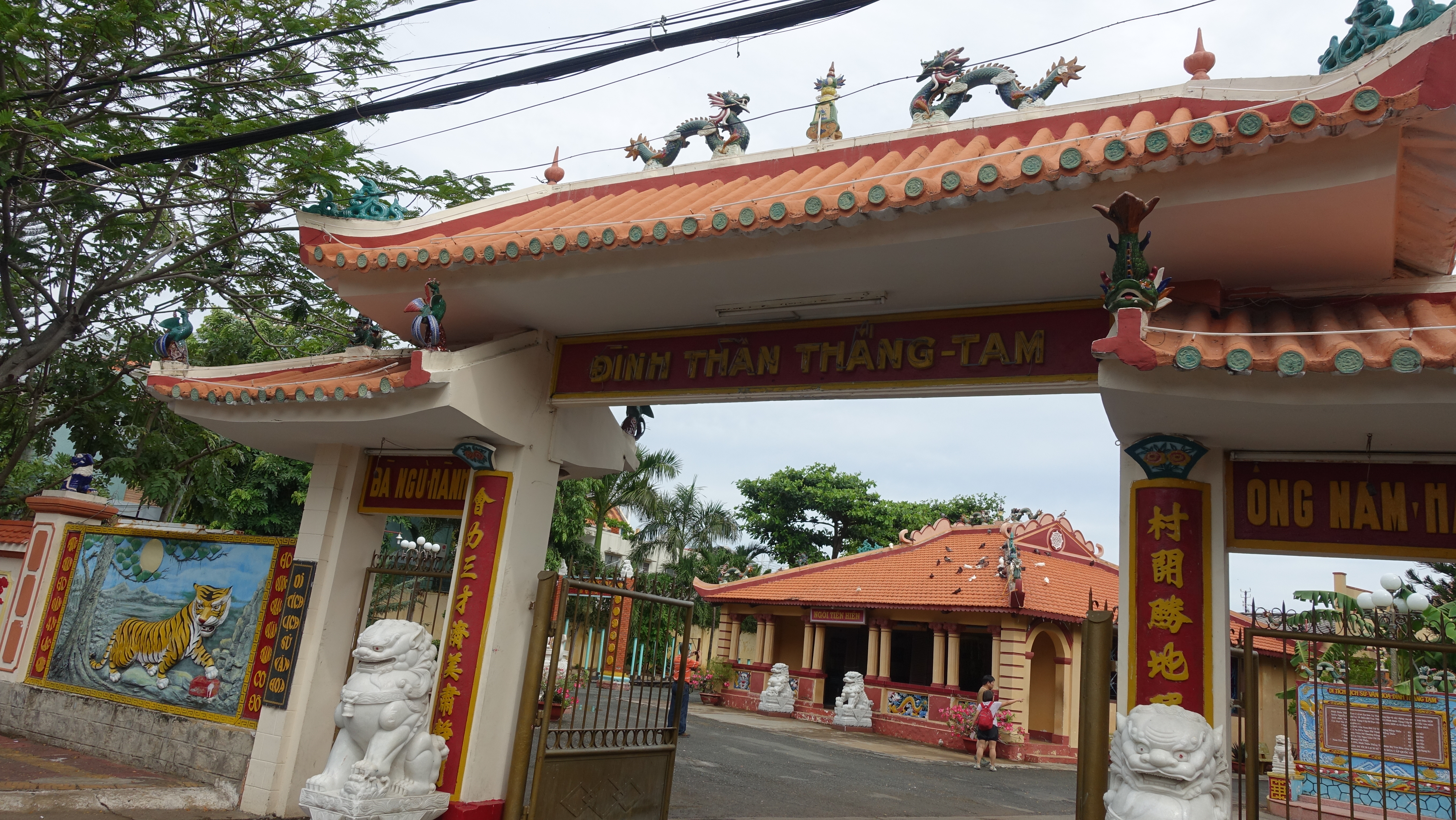
Thắng Tam communal house
