= Thạnh An, Ho Chi Minh City =

Thạnh An Xã Thạnh An
- Commune
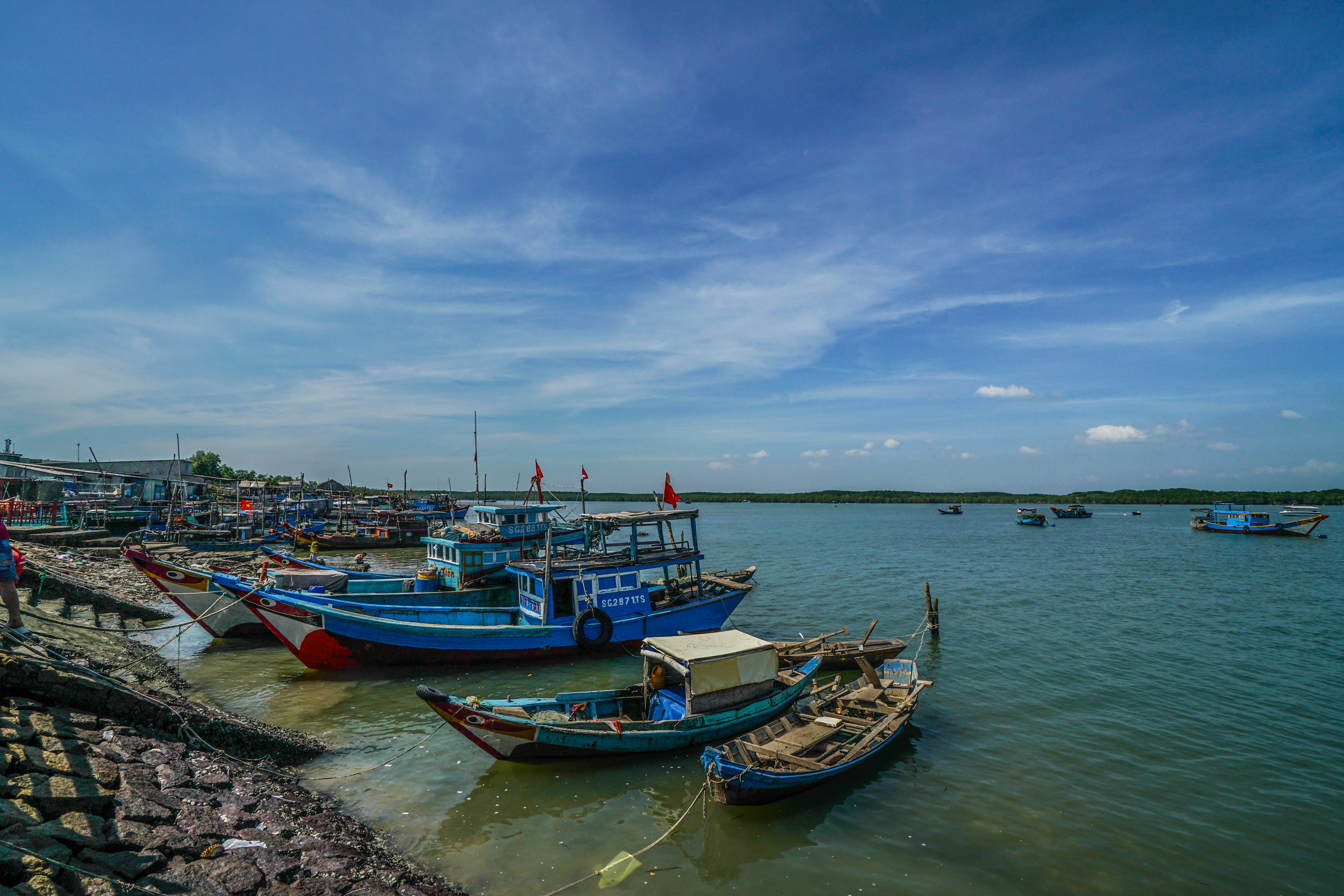
- Boats docked in Thạnh An
- Interactive map of Thạnh An
- Coordinates: 10°28′12″N 106°58′30″E
- Country: Vietnam
- Municipality: Ho Chi Minh City
- Established: June 16, 2025

Area
  - Total: 50.70 sq mi (131.31 km^{2})

Population (2024)
  - Total: 5,180
  - Density: 102/sq mi (39.4/km^{2})
- Time zone: UTC+07:00 (Indochina Time)
- Administrative code: 27676

Thạnh An (Vietnamese: Xã Thạnh An) is a commune of Ho Chi Minh City, Vietnam. It is one of the 168 new wards, communes and special zones of the city following the reorganization in 2025.

== Geography ==
Thạnh An is a coastal area of Ho Chi Minh City. It borders the Ganh Rai Bay of the South China Sea to the south, while the remaining sides are surrounded by tributaries of the Lòng Tàu and Thị Vải rivers, making it geographically isolated from the rest of Ho Chi Minh City.

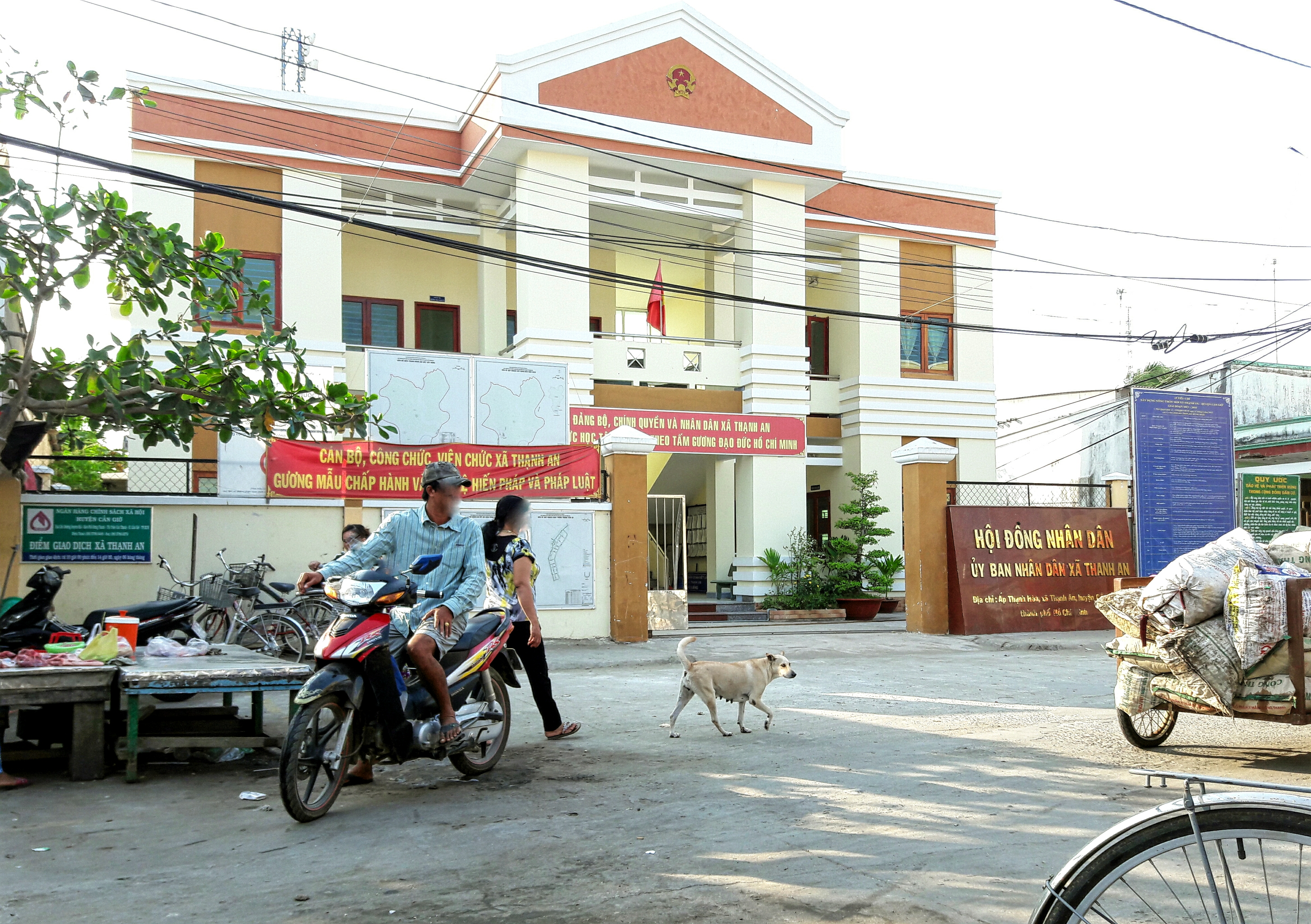
Seat of Thạnh An

The commune is largely covered by mangrove forests. Its residents live in two areas: Thiềng Liềng hamlet, located next to the creek of the same name, and a small coastal islet known as Cù Lao Phú Lợi. The latter serves as the administrative center of the commune and can only be accessed by ferry from Cần Giờ.

== Economy ==
The commune’s economy mostly relies on fishing, salt production, and oyster farming.

== History ==
Thạnh An was formerly a commune of Cần Giờ district. However, following the 2025 Vietnamese administrative reform, all district-level subdivisions, including Cần Giờ, were abolished. Moreover, due to Thạnh An’s geographic isolation, the People's Committee of Ho Chi Minh City decided that it would not be merged with any neighboring communes.

On June 16, 2025, the National Assembly Standing Committee issued Resolution No. 1685/NQ-UBTVQH15 on the arrangement of commune-level administrative units of Ho Chi Minh City in 2025 (effective from June 16, 2025). Accordingly, Thạnh An is one of the 5 wards, communes that are exempted from the merger and remain unchanged (Clause 164, Article 1).
