= Phú Mỹ, Ho Chi Minh City =

Phú Mỹ Phường Phú Mỹ Mỹ Xuân, Phú Thạnh
- Ward
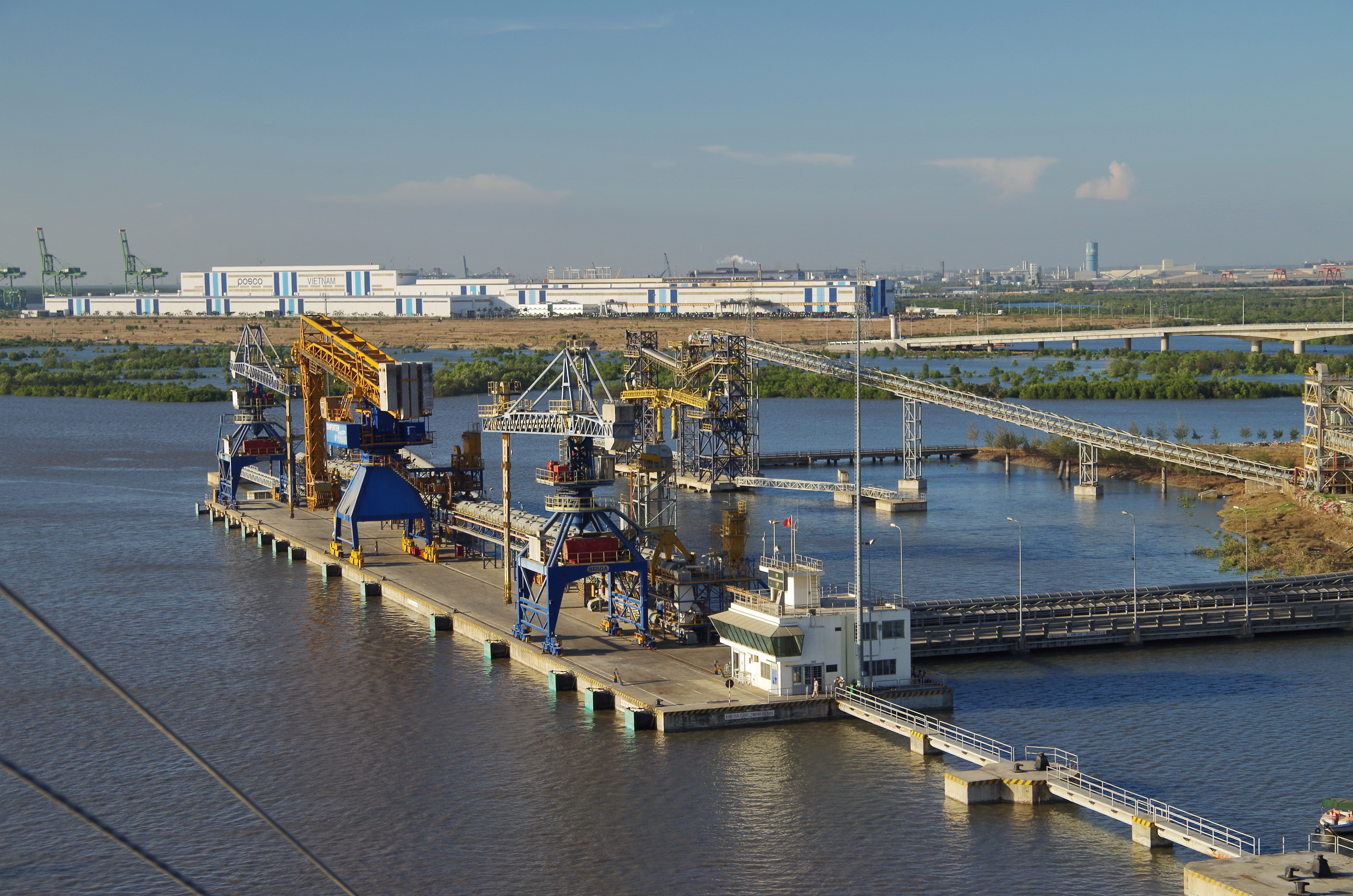
- Port of Phú Mỹ
- Interactive map of Phú Mỹ
- Coordinates: 10°35′26″N 107°02′53″E
- Country: Vietnam
- Municipality: Ho Chi Minh City
- Established: June 16, 2025

Area
  - Total: 27.38 sq mi (70.92 km^{2})

Population (2024)
  - Total: 78,641
  - Density: 2,872/sq mi (1,109/km^{2})
- Time zone: UTC+07:00 (Indochina Time)
- Administrative code: 26704

Phú Mỹ (Vietnamese: Phường Phú Mỹ) is a ward of Ho Chi Minh City, Vietnam. It is one of the 168 new wards, communes and special zones of the city following the reorganization in 2025.

== Geography ==
According to Official Dispatch No. 2896/BNV-CQĐP dated May 27, 2025 of the Ministry of Home Affairs, following the merger, Phú Mỹ has a land area of 70.92 km², the population as of December 31, 2024 is 78,641 people, the population density is 1,108 people/km².

== History ==
After 1975, Phú Mỹ was a commune of Châu Thành district.

On December 8th 1982, the Council of Ministers issued Decision No. 192-HĐBT which states that:

- Phú Mỹ commune will be split into two communes: Phú Mỹ and Mỹ Xuân
- Trảng Lớn hamlet of Phú Mỹ commune will be integrated into Hắc Dịch commune

On June 2, 1994, the Government issued Decree No. 45-CP. It states that:

- Phú Mỹ commune will become part of the newly established Tân Thành district
- The township of Phú Mỹ – capital of Tân Thành district – will be established from the entire 3,100 hectares of land area and 7,765 people of Phú Mỹ commune.

On October 7, 2013, the Ministry of Construction issued Decision No. 969/QD-BXD on recognizing the expanded Phú Mỹ township as a type IV urban area.

On April 12, 2018, Tân Thành district was dissolved to form the new district-level town of Phú Mỹ, the township became a ward of Phú Mỹ town.

On June 16, 2025, the National Assembly Standing Committee issued Resolution No. 1685/NQ-UBTVQH15 on the arrangement of commune-level administrative units of Ho Chi Minh City in 2025 (effective from June 16, 2025). Accordingly, the entire land area and population of Phú Mỹ and Mỹ Xuân wards of the former Phú Mỹ city will be integrated into a new ward named Phú Mỹ (Clause 111, Article 1).
