= Thị Vải River =

River in Vietnam

The Thị Vải River (Vietnamese: Sông Thị Vải) is a river of Vietnam. It flows for 76 kilometres through Bà Rịa–Vũng Tàu province and Đồng Nai province.
