= Vũng Tàu (city) =

Former city of Bà Rịa-Vũng Tàu, Vietnam

Vũng Tàu Thành phố Vũng Tàu Cap Saint Jacques
- Provincial city (Class-1)
- Vũng Tàu City
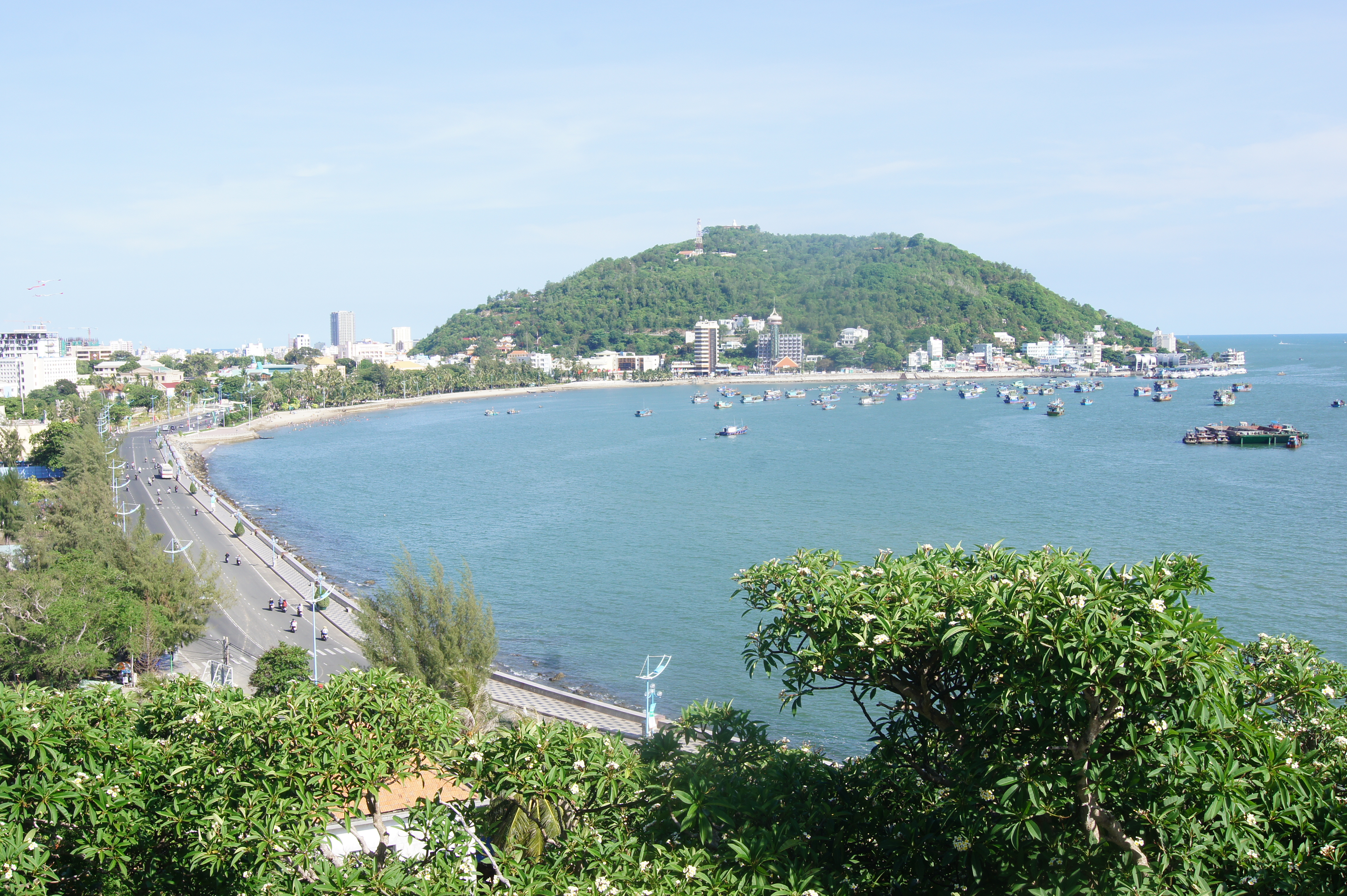
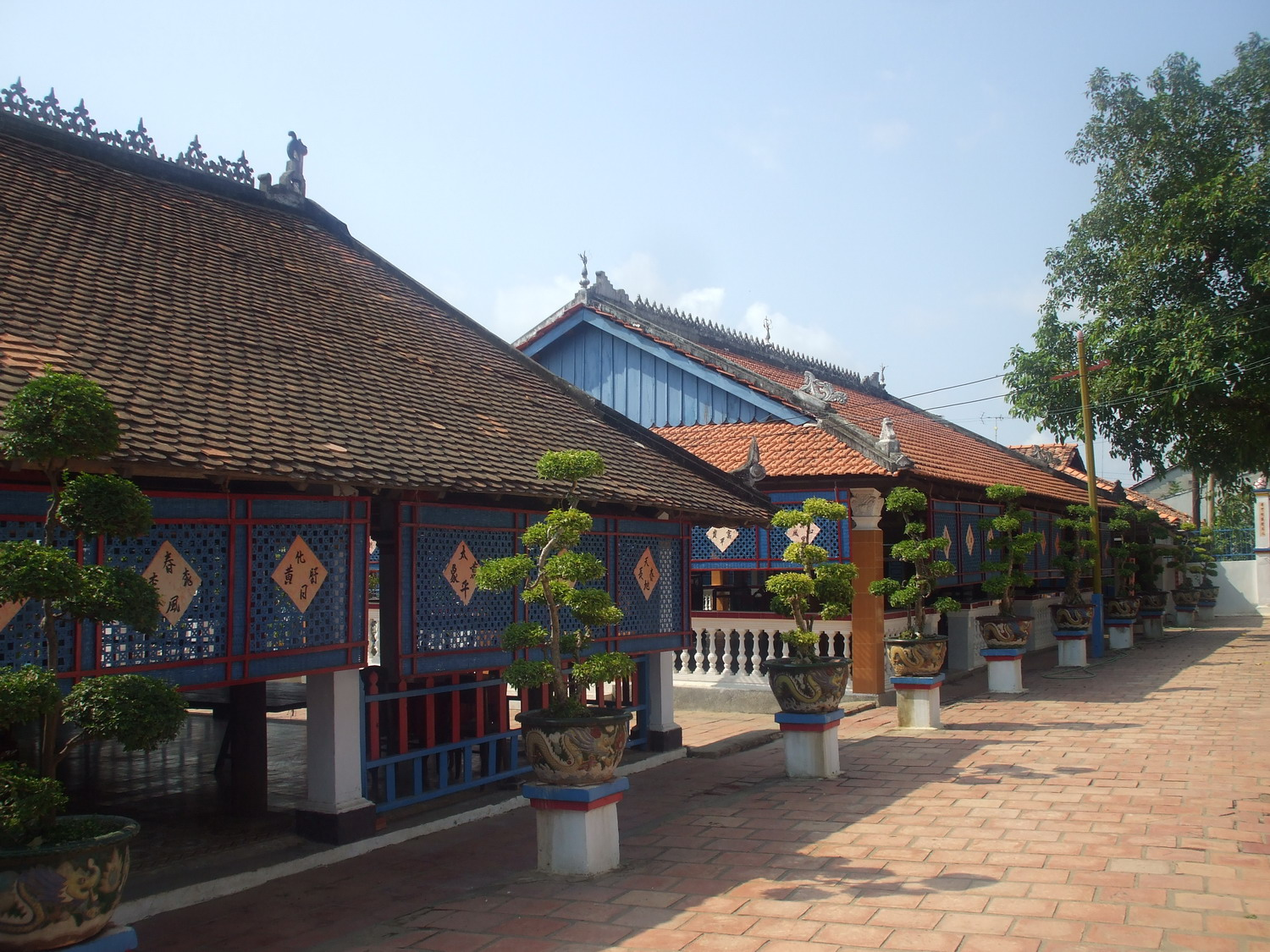
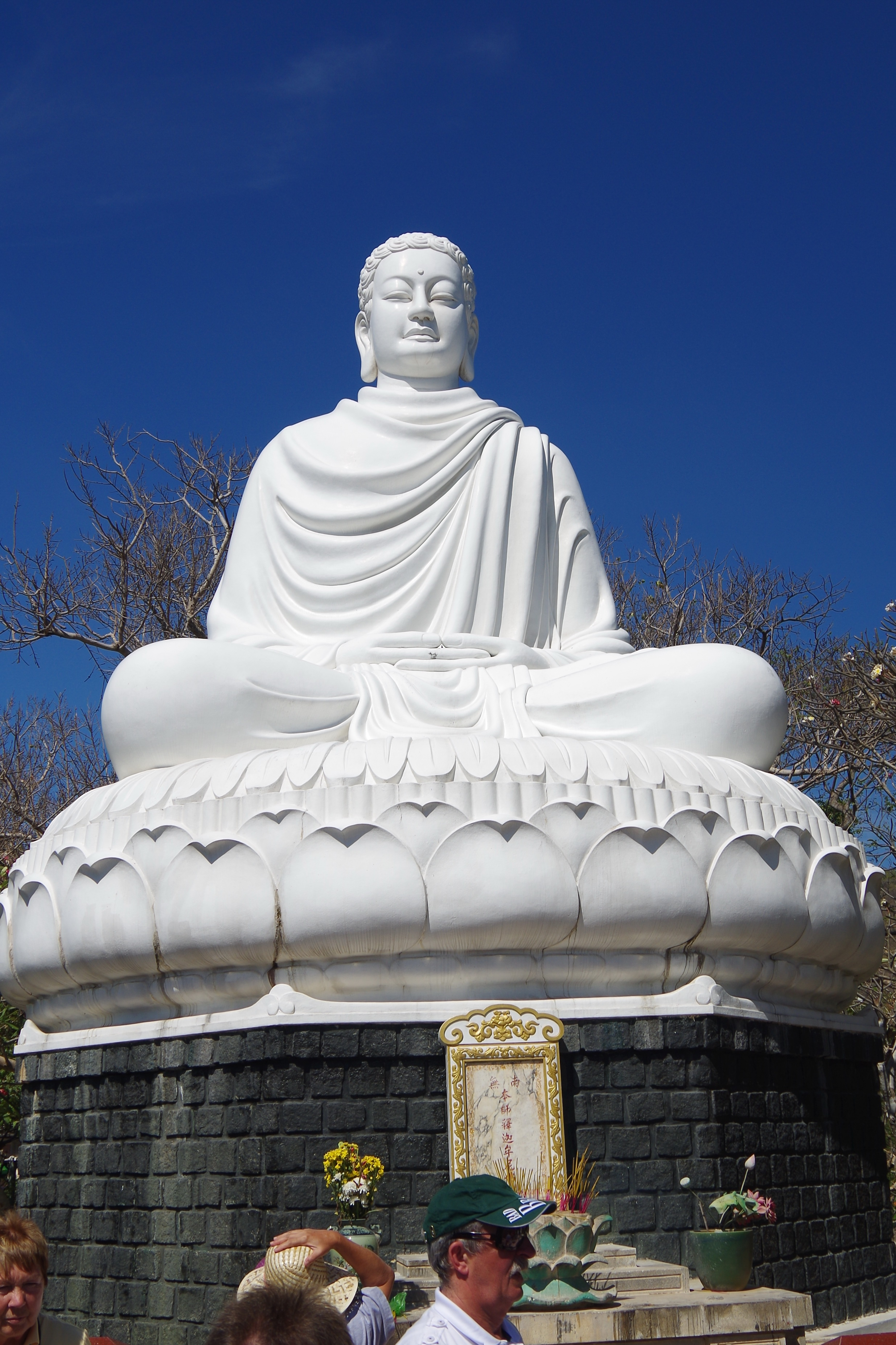
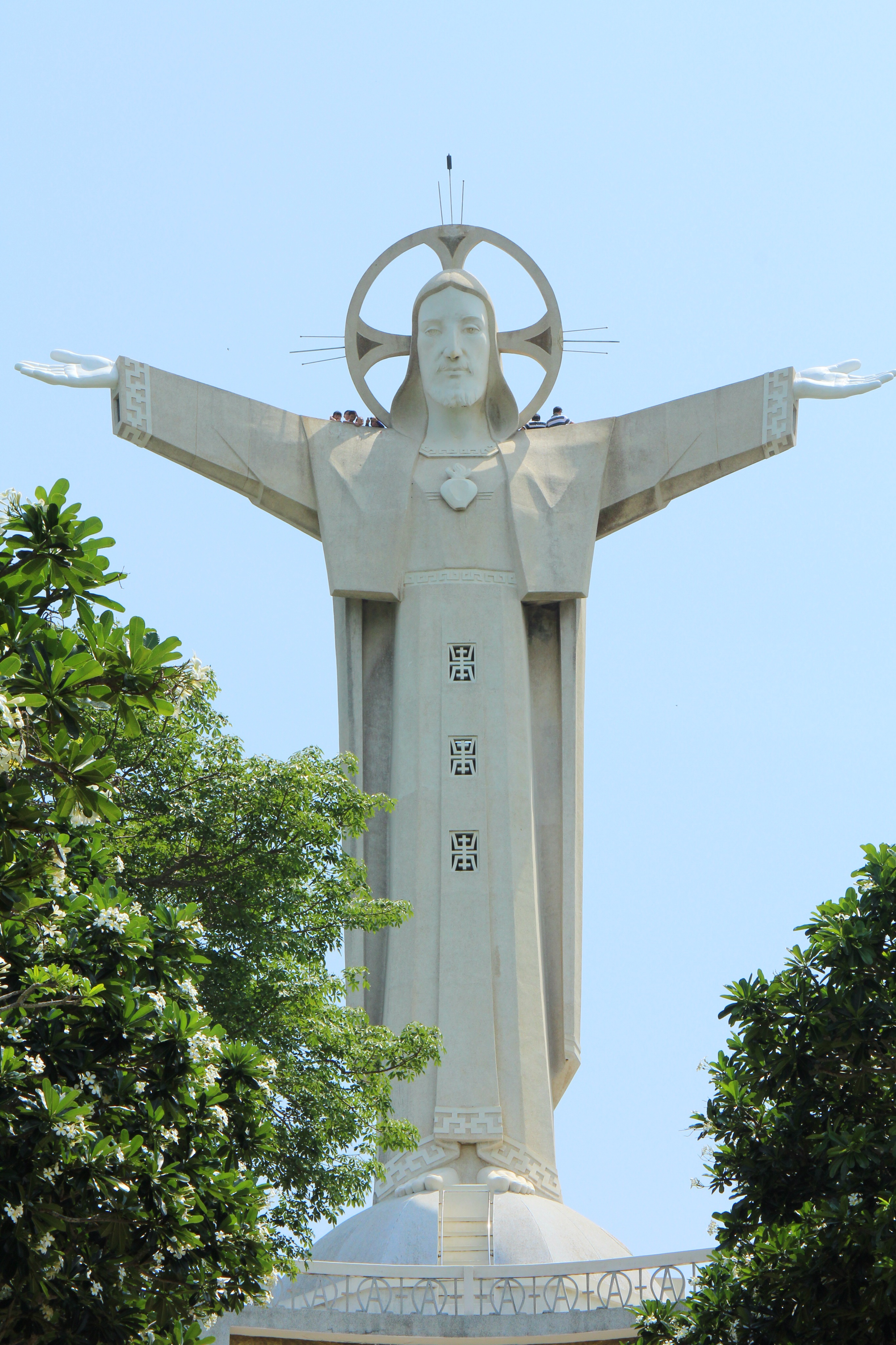
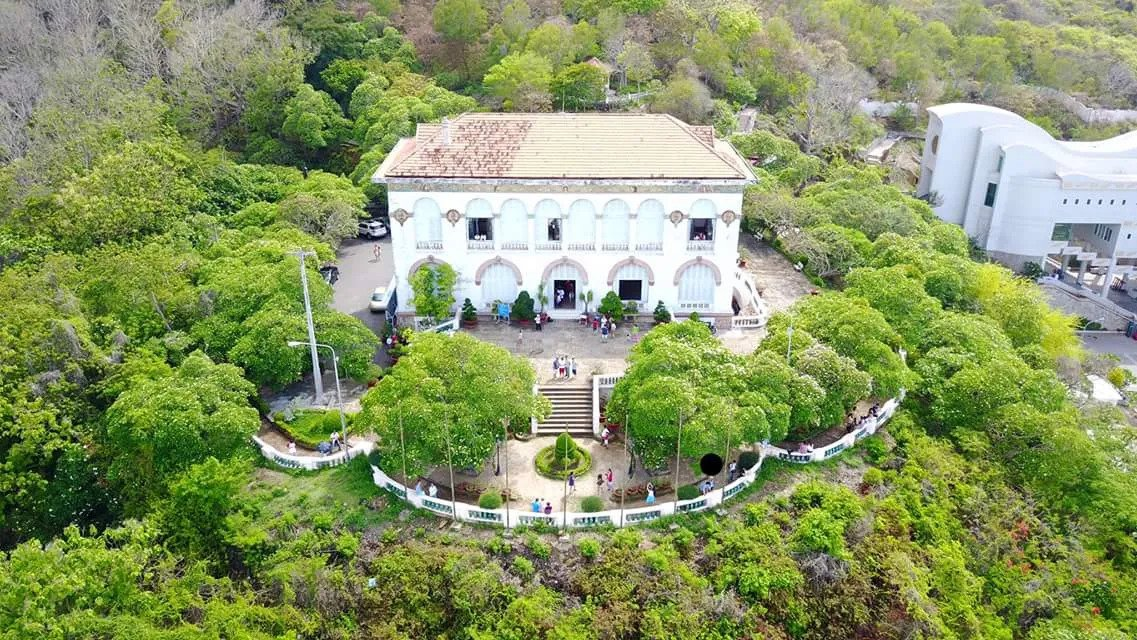
- Clockwise from top: Front Beach skyline, Thích Ca Phật Đài, Villa Blanche (Bạch Dinh, vi), Christ of Vũng Tàu, Long Sơn Mansion (vi)
- Nicknames: Tam Thắng, Ô Cấp (French: au Cap, lit. 'at Cape of Saint-Jacques')
- Map of central Vũng Tàu
- Coordinates: 10°23′N 107°7′E
- Country: Vietnam
- Province: Bà Rịa–Vũng Tàu (formerly)
- Municipality: Ho Chi Minh City (as wards of Vũng Tàu, Tam Thắng, Rạch Dừa and commune of Long Sơn)
- Region: Southeast
- Established: 1822

Government
  - Secretary of CPV: Trần Đình Khoa
  - Chairman of People's Council: Lê Thị Thanh Bình
  - Chairman of People's Committee: Hoàng Vũ Thảnh

Area
  - Land: 141.1 km^{2} (54.5 sq mi)

Population (2022)
  - Total: 464,860
  - Density: 3,295/km^{2} (8,533/sq mi)
  - Ethnicities: Vietnamese

GDP (PPP, constant 2015 values)
  - Year: 2023
  - Total (Metro): $14.7 billion
  - Per capita: $32,400
- Time zone: UTC+7 (Indochina Time)
- Postal code: 790000

Vũng Tàu (Saigon accent: [juŋm˧˩˧ taːw˨˩], Hanoi accent: [vuŋm˧ˀ˥ taw˨˩]) is a former coastal city in southeast Vietnam. The city covered 141.1 km^{2} (54.5 sq mi) of area and consisted of 16 urban wards on Vũng Tàu island with an islandic commune of Long Sơn, including the same name island and Gò Găng Island. The city is known as a major crude oil extraction center of Vietnam.

Since July 2025, Vũng Tàu City was legally abolished and became a part of Ho Chi Minh City just like its parent province Bà Rịa–Vũng Tàu. The name Vũng Tàu was then re-adopted by a ward-level subdivision covering the southern cape of the peninsula, the heart of the former city; however, the whole area of the former city is still colloquially called as 'Vũng Tàu' as is the case where many other major provincial cities in the nation that were dissolved.

== History ==
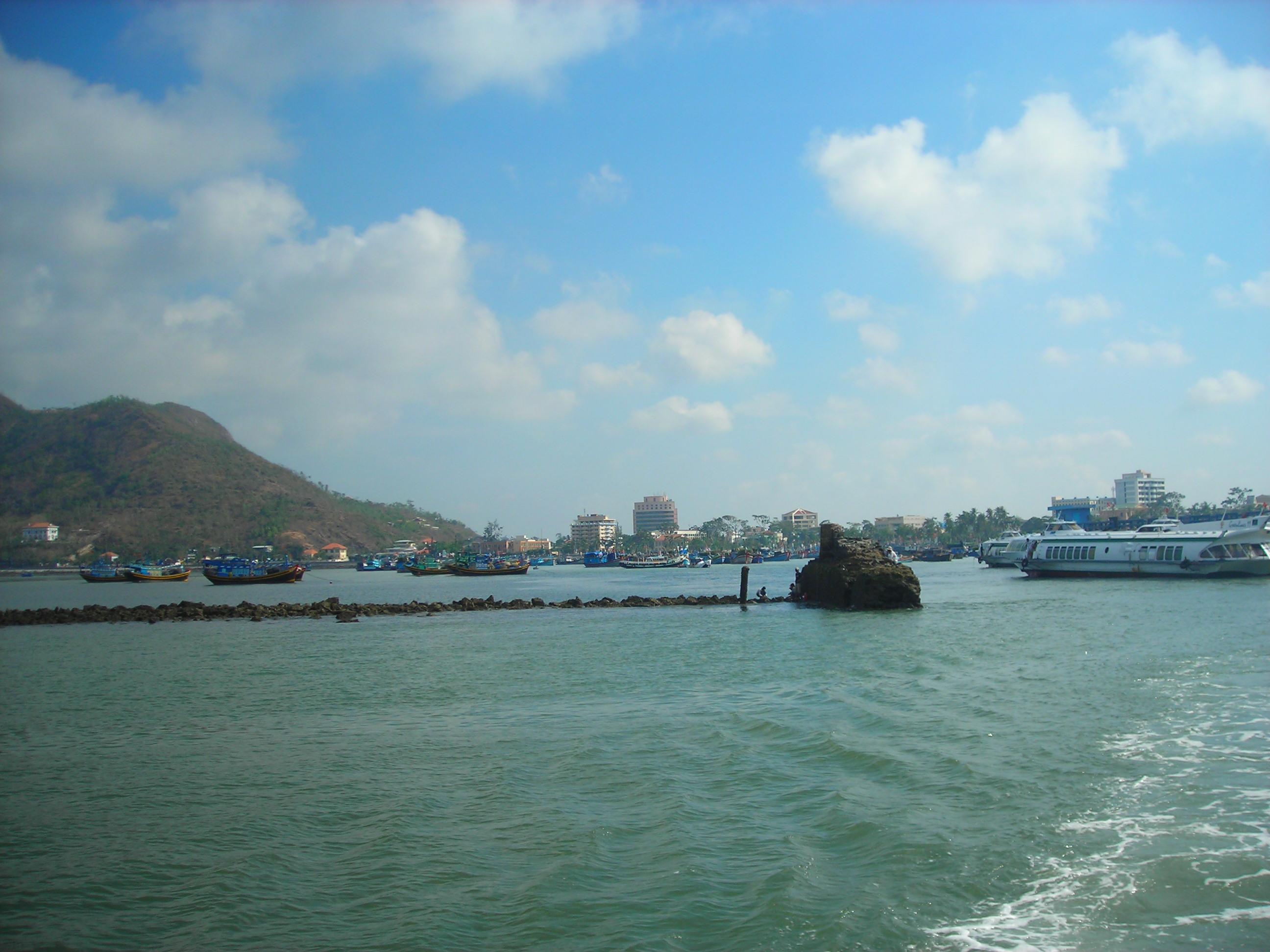
The Front Beach in Vũng Tàu with the hydrofoil in the lower right corner

According to archeological excavations in 2002 and 2005 in Giồng Lớn, a coastal sandbank in Long Sơn island, humans have lived in the area since the 2nd millennium BC. Evidence of burial sites, working tools, clay pots, jewelleries, weapons and other tools suggested close connections with the Óc Eo Culture and trade activities with nearby countries.

Between 1st and 7th centuries, Vũng Tàu was ruled by Funan, who were replaced by the Chenla Kingdom. Little is known of Vũng Tàu during the Funan and Chenla period.

In 1295, Zhou Daguan, a Yuan Chinese diplomat serving under Temur Khan, passed by a place called Zhenpu (真蒲, also written as Chen-p'u or Chân Bồ), probably in the region of Vũng Tàu or southern Vietnam, on his official voyage to Angkor. In his book The Customs of Cambodia, he describes Zhenpu as the frontier and territory of Cambodia.

During 14th and 15th centuries, the cape that would become Vũng Tàu was a swamp which European trading ships visited regularly. The ships' activities inspired the name Vũng Tàu, which means "anchorage". The Portuguese referred to this place as Oporto Cinco Chagas or simply Cinco Chagas in their maps. Apres de Mannevillette (1707–1780), one of the greatest French chart-publishers, mentioned Saint Jacques in his book La Neptune Oriental. This term was later adopted by Europeans and the French.

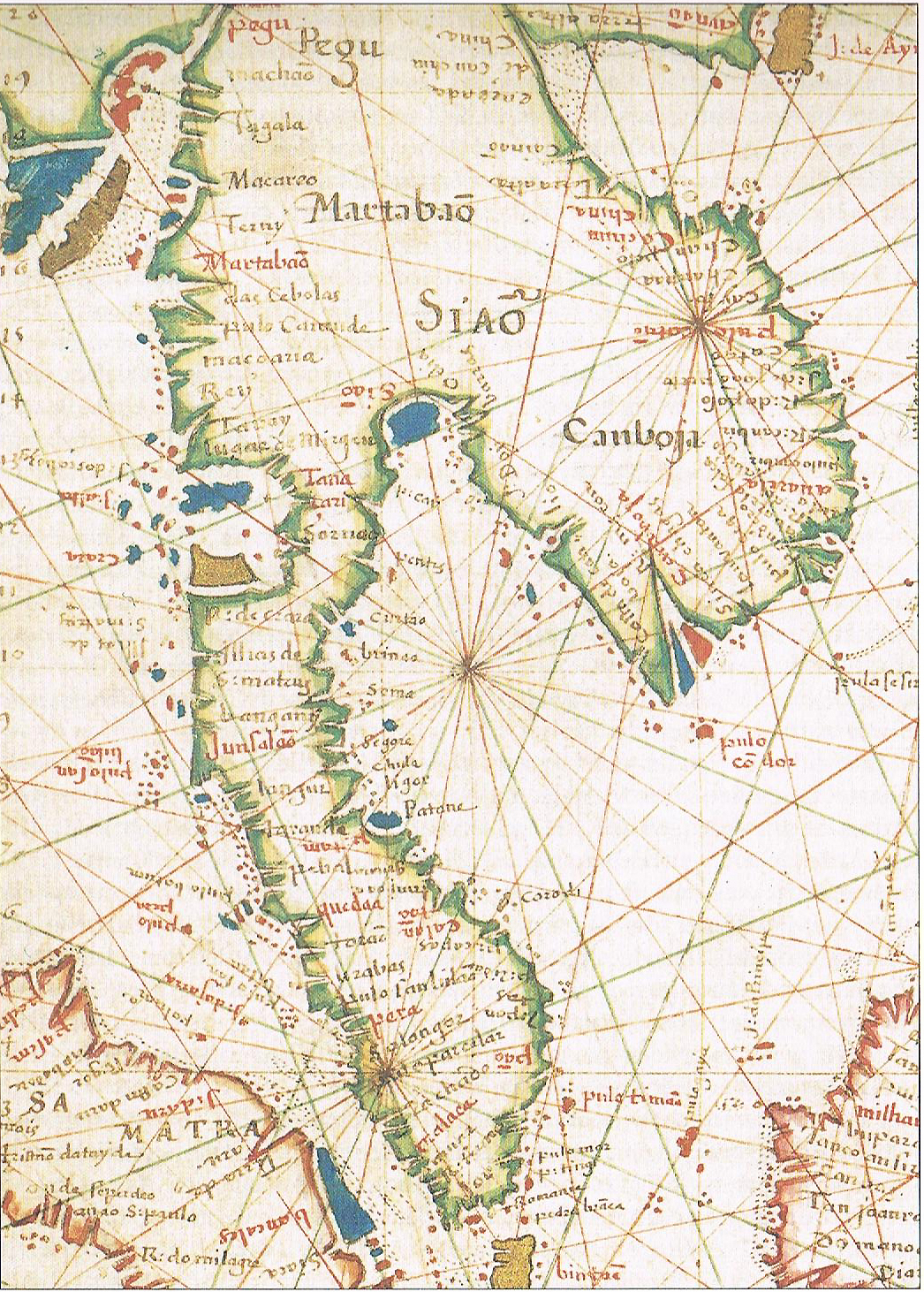
A Portuguese map of 17th century mentioning Vung Tau as Cinco Chagas

The French Indochinese government later named it Cap Saint-Jacques (Cáp Xanh-Giắc, in Vietnamese). The cliff of Vũng Tàu is now called Mũi Nghinh Phong (literally meaning "Cape of breeze welcome" or "Cape of greeting wind").

=== Vietnamese settlement ===
During the 16th and 17th century, conflicts caused by the opposing clans in the Trịnh–Nguyễn War led to emigrations of Vietnamese people from Thuận Quảng to the coastal area near Vũng Tàu.

Vũng Tàu was originally referred to as Tam Thắng ("Three Boats") in memory of the first three villages in this area: Thắng Nhất (or Nhứt), Thắng Nhì (or Nhị) and Thắng Tam, within the province of Biên Hòa under the Nguyễn dynasty. Under the reign of emperor Gia Long (1761–1820), when Malay pirates built a base here and subsequently became a danger to traders in Gia Định city, the king sent 3 army detachments to crack down on the pirates. The pirates were defeated and the troops were given the land as an incentive to continue to protect the area. The villages, then named Thắng Nhất, Thắng Nhì and Thắng Tam (勝一, 勝二, 勝三) occupied arable areas at the southern tip and along the western shore of the peninsula.

The kings Gia Long, Minh Mạng and Thiệu Trị invested heavily into Vũng Tàu's protection, by opening various defensive facilities. A military barrack, Phước Thắng bảo (福勝堡), on the hill slope overlooking the Buffalo Cape, then called was built in 1839. The barrack was operated as a fortress and armed with 6 bronze cannons

=== French colonisation ===
10 February 1859 marked the first use of cannons by Nguyễn's army, when they fired at French battleships from the fortress of Phước Thắng, located 100m from Vũng Tàu's Front Beach. This marked an important period in Vietnam's war against French invaders in southern Vietnam (then called Cochinchina).

In 1876, according to a decree by the French government, Vũng Tàu was merged in Bà Rịa county per Saigon's administration. During the 1880s there were talks about moving Saigon's port facilities to Vũng Tàu, but this came to nothing due to Saigon's better infrastructure.

On 1 May 1895, the governor of Cochinchina established by decree that Cap Saint Jacques would thereafter be an autonomous town. In 1898, Cap Saint Jacques was merged with Bà Rịa county once again, but re-divided in 1899. In 1901, the population of Vũng Tàu was 5,690, of which 2,000 persons were immigrants from northern Vietnam. Most of the town's population made their living in the fishing, farming and service industries. On 4 April 1905, Cap Saint Jacques was made an administrative district of Bà Rịa province. In 1929, Cap Saint Jacques became a province, and in 1934 became a city (commune).

Between 1885 and 1934 period, the French designed the town centre along the Front Beach, then named Baie de Cocotiers, along with several notable architectural works for the administrative function such as l'Hôtel de l'Inspection, the Post Office, Grand Hotel and the Lighthouse. In 1898, the French governor of Indochina, Paul Doumer (who later became president of France), built the Villa Blanche in Vũng Tàu that is still a prominent landmark.

A national route was paved in 1896 (then called Colonial route 15), as well as a jetty in the Front Beach to connect Cap with Saigon.

In the First Indochina War Vũng Tàu's military hospital facility was used by French soldiers on sick leave.

On 21 July 1952 Viet Minh fighters disguising themselves in French military uniforms and armed with machetes, grenades, and Sten submachine guns snuck into the building's R&R centre, where a number of unarmed French officers were having dinner with their families. The rebels threw a grenade from the kitchen killing the Vietnamese bartender, then shot the cook Nguyen Van Loc who was trying to play dead. Attackers stationed in the hallway found the four children of Air Vietnam President Jean Perrin—Christian, Elysabeth, Michel, and Nicole—who were playing a game of hide-and-seek. Elysabeth, Christian and Nicole were gunned down by the Viet Minh, and Michel who tried to run away was hacked to death with machetes. Now that the coast was clear they entered the dining room where the French customers were attacked with gunfire and grenade attacks. Twenty people including four Vietnamese civilians were killed in the attack, and 23 were injured. The only people to survive unharmed were a boy who hid behind a chair and a lieutenant who covered himself in a dead woman's blood to make it appear he was dead.

=== South Vietnam ===
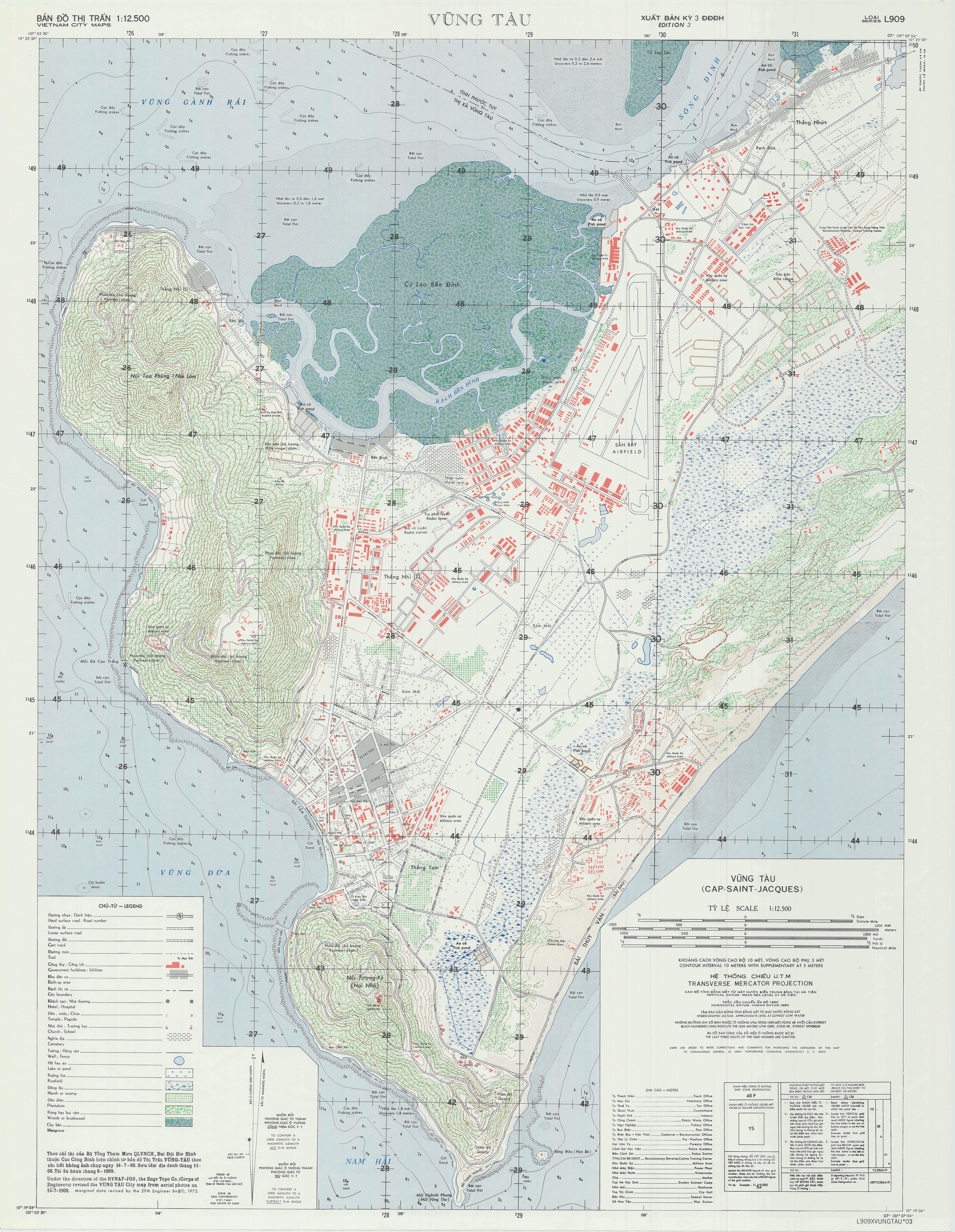
A 1969 map of Vung Tau showing numerous military facilities in Vũng Tàu

After the Geneva Agreement was signed, the State of Vietnam and Republic of Vietnam resettled 1 million people from the North to southern Vietnam, including more than 800,000 Catholic Christians. Three temporary resettlement camps were established in Vung Tau. The local government placed these new residents at key locations along Route 15 (now National Route 51) such as Bến Đá, Thắng Nhất, Thắng Nhì, Rạch Dừa, Phước Thắng and Phước Thành, forming many religious Catholic parishes throughout the region.

With a strategic location right at the sea route close to the capital city of Saigon, the government of the Republic of Vietnam and its allies in the United States, Australia, and South Korea consolidated and developed Vung Tau into a strategic defense spot. After taking over French military facilities here, the Army of the Republic of Vietnam established many large training facilities such as the Training Center for Rural Construction Officers, the Communications School, and the Military Police School, Cade School and Military Hospital.

During the Vietnam War, the 1st Australian Logistics Support Group was based in Vũng Tàu – as were various United States military units at different times. Vũng Tàu also became popular for R&R, among in-country US, Australian and New Zealand personnel.

Due to its rising significance as a military base and coastal beach resort, Vung Tau attracted a large number of residents during the war time. Its population rose from 29,390 in 1955 to a whopping 119,300 in 1973.

=== The fall of Vũng Tàu ===
In the last days of April 1975, many South Vietnamese troops retreated to Vũng Tàu as the communists closed on southern Vietnam. After the capture of Bà Rịa and Phước Tuy province on 27 April, the 3rd Division forces began their attacks on Vũng Tàu. However, the Cỏ May bridge had been destroyed, and strong defense from ARVN Airborne at the south end of the bridge proved fatal to the northern forces. The Division's 12th Regiment was then landed by fishing boats behind the Airborne lines and this, together with a renewed attack by the 2nd Regiment, forced the Airborne to retreat into Vũng Tàu. At 01:30 on 30 April the Division began its attack on Vũng Tàu forcing the Airborne into the city center where they eventually succumbed at 11:00.^{:chapter 6}

A fierce armed hostage crisis took place between the ARVN officers and the communists at Palace Hotel ended with the final surrender at 13:30.

=== Reunified Vietnam ===
After the reunification of Vietnam, Vũng Tàu was administered as a city under the Republic of Southern Vietnam. Politically, it is governed by the Military Administration Committee of Vũng Tàu City, led by Phạm Văn Hy (Tư Hy), Chairman, who is also the secretary of the Communist Party Committee of the City. In January 1976, a major adjustment of administrative boundary in southern Vietnam saw the merger of Vũng Tàu and three nearby provinces into Đồng Nai. Vũng Tàu then became a district-level town (thị xã) of this new province.

After the war, due to Vietnam being put under debilitating trade embargoes by the United States and failing economy, Vũng Tàu was a common launching place for the "Vietnamese boat people" – refugees escaping the post-war Communist regime. The government-led nationalisation of private entreprises, collectivisation of the economy, central planning and money changes carried out in the post-war years brought in hardships for the majority of people.

=== Special zone ===
After oil was discovered in southern Vietnamese waters, the Vietnamese government pushed for the exploitation and extraction of this new resource. On 30 May 1979, Vũng Tàu was merged with Côn Đảo Islands to form Vũng Tàu-Côn Đảo Special Zone in a bid to facilitate the new service and logistics hub for the oil industry. Between 1980 and 1982, the city saw drastic changes in infrastructure and demographically was transformed into a service and logistics hub for the new industry. Politically, the Special zone was given the same status as provinces and centrally-run cities. Administratively, it was divided into 1 district (Côn Đảo) and 5 wards: Châu Thành, Thắng Nhất, Thắng Nhì, Thắng Tam, Phước Thắng and Long Sơn commune.

The central government assigned nearly 10,000 officers and professional engineers from many non-business units, industries, construction and the military. A seaport logistics service area serving the import and export of technical materials and petroleum products was established in a swamp area along the shore of Gành Rái Bay.

After the signing of Soviet-Vietnam agreement on oil exploitation and establishment of Vietsovpetro, the city welcomed more than 2,000 Soviet officials and experts to work in the joint venture. To create comfortable accommodation for the new workers, in 1985 the special zone government and the General Department of Petroleum built a separate dormitory for these people, often called the "5-storey area". Currently, this apartment complex still has more than 520 households with about 1,000 Russians living and working.

=== Provincial city ===
On 12 August 1991, the Special Zone was dissolved by a governmental decree. Bà Rịa–Vũng Tàu province was officially created from this former zone and nearby districts of Đồng Nai Province. Vũng Tàu once again was re-established as a thành phố (city).

Success from Đổi Mới and profits from seafood and petroleum exports brought a large budget source to Ba Ria-Vung Tau province, creating positive changes to repel the socio-economic crisis. The production value of economic sectors across the city only reached 271 billion VND at the time of establishment, by 2021, it reached 70,500 billion VND (260 times than the origin).

in the 1990s, the tourism and industrial production sectors began to thrive. In 1996, the city inaugurated Đông Xuyên Industrial Park.

In the late 1990s and 2000s, the city carried out a spectacular transformation with the construction and improvement of inner city roads, and the expansion of many key projects such as Lê Hồng Phong Blvd, Martyrs Memorial and Five-way roundabout. March 2 Blvd (National Highway 51C) was also built and inaugurated during this period, replacing 30 Thang 4 (National Highway 51A) as the main road leading into the centre. As of 2023, 100% of roads and alleys were paved and solidified. The openings of Gò Găng and Cửa Lấp bridges helped connect Vũng Tàu with nearby districts faster.

Numerous commercial and urban developmental projects were established during the 2000s such as Vũng Tàu City Commercial Centre, Chí Linh Urban Area, Đại An Urban Area and Á Châu Urban Area.

In 2012, the provincial administrative centre moved to Bà Rịa.

In July 2025, following the Vietnamese administrative reforms, Vũng Tàu City was dissolved into 4 wards of Vũng Tàu, Tam Thắng, Rạch Dừa, Phước Thắng and the unchanged Long Sơn commune. The Bà Rịa–Vũng Tàu province was also dissolved and merged into Ho Chi Minh City, leads to the Vũng Tàu City area is now part of the new Ho Chi Minh City with its divisions are directly under the city.

== Geography ==
=== Location ===
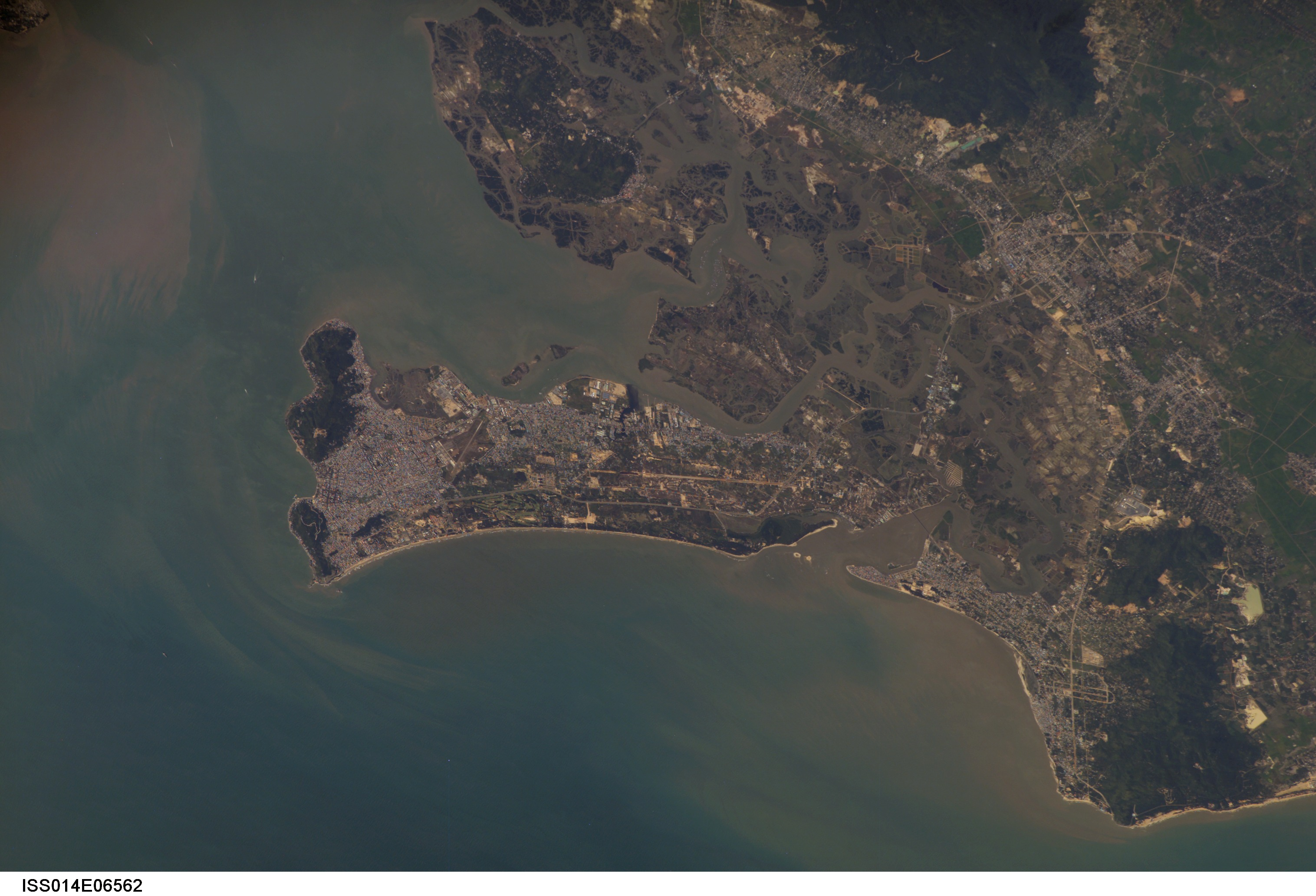
Satellite image of Vũng Tàu peninsula in 2006

Vũng Tàu consisted a large territory situated on a peninsula of the same name, along with the islands of Long Sơn, Gò Găng and several smaller islands located in the southern part of Bà Rịa–Vũng Tàu province. The city is 95 km away to the southeast of Ho Chi Minh City by road (80 km as the crow flies), and serves as a vital gateway to the sea for the Southeast region, it borders with:

- Long Đất district to the east by Cửa Lấp River
- Cần Giờ district to the west by Gành Rái Bay
- South China Sea to the south
- Bà Rịa and Phú Mỹ to the north by Cỏ May and Rạng River.

Viewed along a north-south axis, Vũng Tàu is located at the bend—where the coastline shifts from a southerly to a westerly direction—along the lower curve of the "S" shape (as seen on a map of Vietnam). It protrudes from the mainland as a strip of land approximately 14 km long and 6 km wide.

=== Area and population ===
The city of Vũng Tàu has an area of 141.1 km^{2} (54.5 sq mi) and a population of 527,025 people as of 2018. According to statistics, as of September 2017, the city had 112,358 households with a total of 673,540 people managed through the city police's population and household registration software system. If we include those who have been working and living in Vung Tau for a long time but do not have household registration, the actual population is much larger.

=== Topography & Geology ===
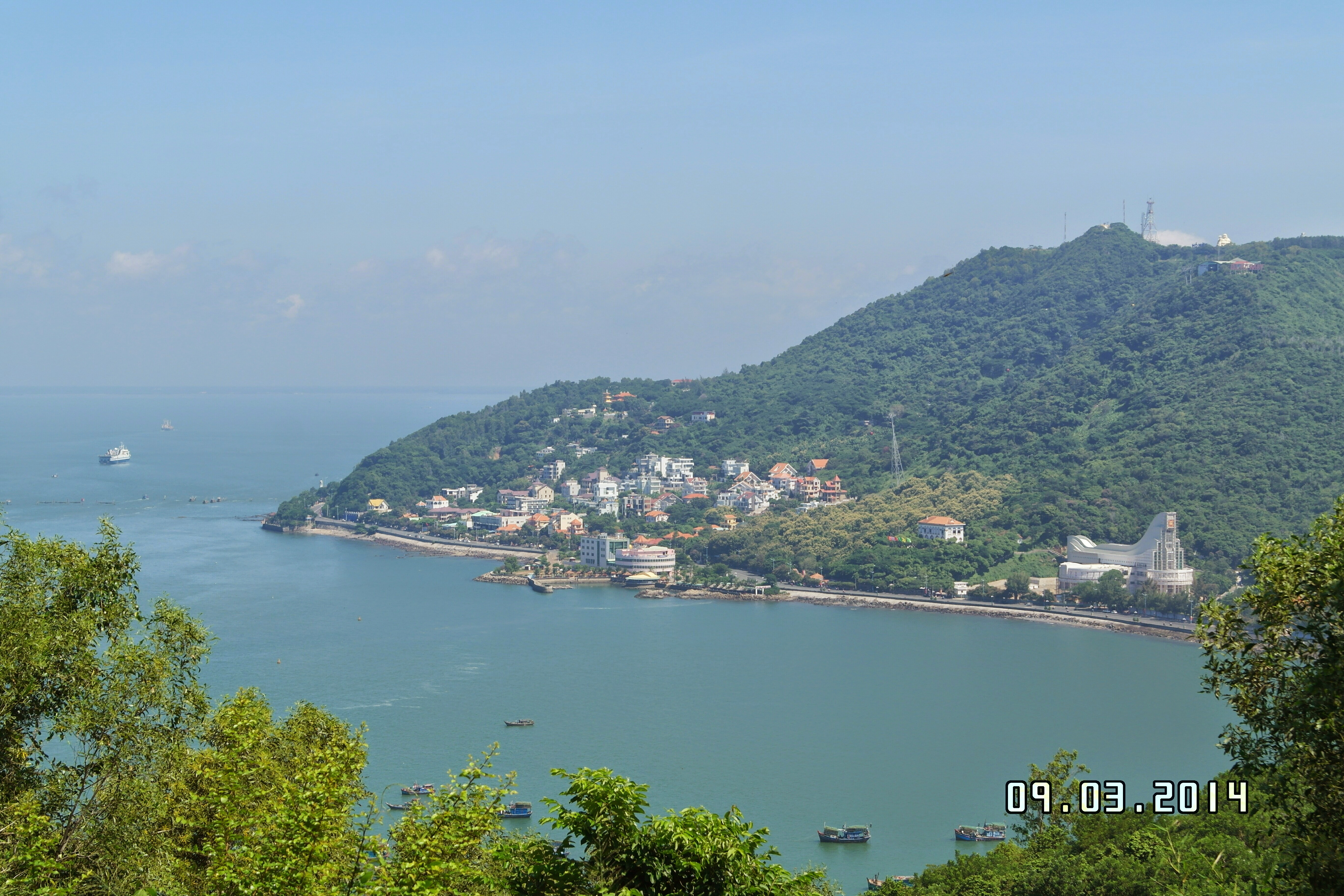
Bãi Dâu Bay on Tương Kỳ Mount slope

Vũng Tàu city is located at the intersection of 3 tectonic fault zones: Tiền River zone, Saigon River zone and Hàm Tân-Vũng Tàu zone. According to statistics from the Institute of Physics and Geophysics, there is a possibility of an earthquake occurring in this area once every 50 years. The city of Vũng Tàu can be divided into 2 distinct areas: Vũng Tàu peninsula and coastal islands.

Vũng Tàu peninsula is long and narrow, with an area of 82.86 km^{2} (31.99 sq mi), an average height of 3-4m above sea level and 42 km of coastline surrounding it. The topography of the peninsula mainly consists of low-lying plains with many ponds, lakes and swamps scattered among dry hills. The southwestern part of the peninsula is guarded by two mountain ranges: Núi Lớn (Big Mount or Tương Kỳ Mount) and Núi Nhỏ (Small Mount or Tao Phùng Mount). Mixed forests are found on these two mountain ranges. Along the eastern coast, there is a strip of sand dunes and casuarina forests, stretching over 8 km from the foot of Núi Nhỏ to Cửa Lấp. To the north of the peninsula is a natural mangrove forest with many brackish streams and river. The inner city area lies entirely on this peninsula, it is also the most densely populated area in the province and the economic engine of the city and entire province.

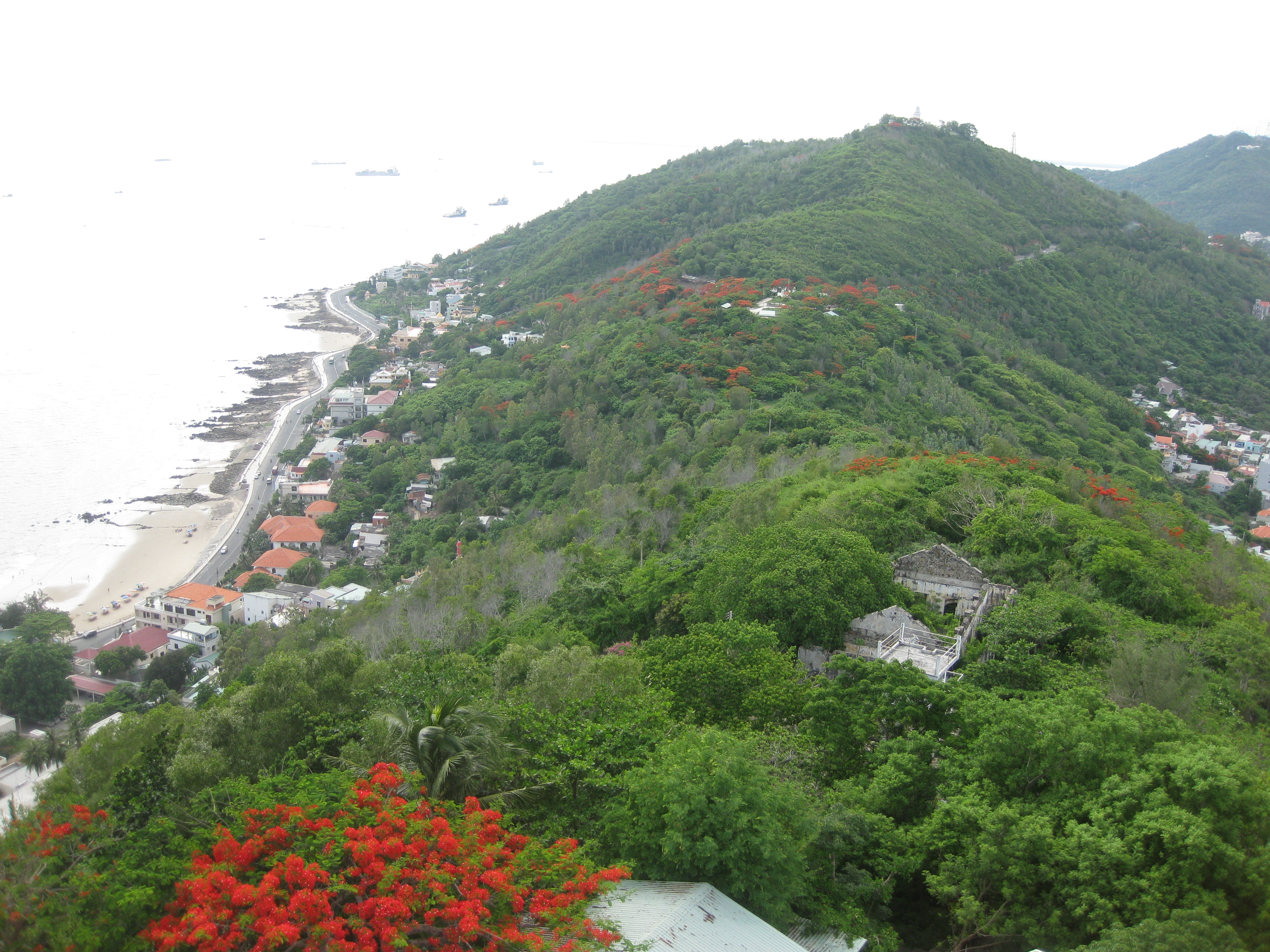
Tao Phùng Mount

On Núi Nhỏ stands an 18-meter-high lighthouse, illuminating up to 30 nautical miles and over 100 years old, considered the oldest lighthouse in Vietnam, the road leads to it also named after it in Vietnamese (Hải Đăng). On Núi Lớn is Hồ Mây (lit. 'Cloudy lake'), a large freshwater lake and primeval forest. The city is surrounded by the sea, primeval forests, high mountains, and also rivers and many large lakes, resulting in a cool and mild climate year-round. The city is filled with greenery and flowers planted everywhere.

=== Climate ===
Vũng Tàu City is located in a tropical monsoon climate zone, influenced by the ocean. The average annual temperature is approximately 27.5 °C; the highest is in May (29.3 °C); the lowest is in February (25.6 °C). The number of sunshine hours per year is approximately 2,779 hours, evenly distributed throughout the year. The average annual relative humidity is 78.8%.

The average annual rainfall is low (around 1,271 mm) and unevenly distributed, resulting in two distinct seasons: the rainy season from May to October, accounting for 90% of the annual rainfall, and the dry season from November to April of the following year.

Due to its location in the Southern region and low latitude, Vũng Tàu is less affected by typhoons. However, Typhoon Durian in 2006 caused severe damage to people and property in the city and the entire Bà Rịa–Vũng Tàu province.

Climate data for Vũng Tàu
Month	Jan	Feb	Mar	Apr	May	Jun	Jul	Aug	Sep	Oct	Nov	Dec	Year
Record high °C (°F)	33.0 (91.4)	35.8 (96.4)	37.0 (98.6)	37.6 (99.7)	38.4 (101.1)	36.4 (97.5)	34.6 (94.3)	35.3 (95.5)	35.7 (96.3)	34.7 (94.5)	34.0 (93.2)	34.7 (94.5)	38.4 (101.1)
Mean daily maximum °C (°F)	29.3 (84.7)	29.6 (85.3)	30.6 (87.1)	32.0 (89.6)	32.4 (90.3)	31.8 (89.2)	31.2 (88.2)	31.1 (88.0)	31.0 (87.8)	30.7 (87.3)	30.6 (87.1)	29.8 (85.6)	30.9 (87.6)
Daily mean °C (°F)	25.3 (77.5)	25.7 (78.3)	27.0 (80.6)	28.5 (83.3)	28.8 (83.8)	28.0 (82.4)	27.4 (81.3)	27.3 (81.1)	27.2 (81.0)	27.0 (80.6)	26.8 (80.2)	25.8 (78.4)	27.1 (80.8)
Mean daily minimum °C (°F)	23.1 (73.6)	23.9 (75.0)	25.5 (77.9)	26.8 (80.2)	26.6 (79.9)	25.8 (78.4)	25.3 (77.5)	25.4 (77.7)	25.2 (77.4)	25.0 (77.0)	24.7 (76.5)	23.6 (74.5)	25.1 (77.2)
Record low °C (°F)	16.8 (62.2)	18.0 (64.4)	16.8 (62.2)	19.7 (67.5)	18.7 (65.7)	17.9 (64.2)	17.5 (63.5)	18.2 (64.8)	18.6 (65.5)	18.7 (65.7)	17.0 (62.6)	15.0 (59.0)	15.0 (59.0)
Average rainfall mm (inches)	4.3 (0.17)	1.1 (0.04)	5.2 (0.20)	34.0 (1.34)	181.7 (7.15)	223.8 (8.81)	225.0 (8.86)	206.0 (8.11)	218.5 (8.60)	239.5 (9.43)	63.6 (2.50)	16.4 (0.65)	1,418.9 (55.86)
Average rainy days	1.0	0.4	1.0	3.7	14.3	18.7	19.9	18.7	18.4	16.9	6.8	3.5	120.8
Average relative humidity (%)	77.2	77.4	77.2	76.9	79.1	81.7	82.8	83.3	83.7	84.0	81.0	78.7	80.3
Mean monthly sunshine hours	240.7	250.8	285.6	271.7	229.2	192.4	205.8	195.7	183.7	188.7	202.9	204.5	2,643.3
Source 1: Vietnam Institute for Building Science and Technology
Source 2: The Yearbook of Indochina

== Administrative divisions ==
As of July 2025, Vũng Tàu was divided into 16 wards (phường): 1, 2, 3, 4, 5, 7, 8, 9, 10, 11, 12, Thắng Nhất, Thắng Nhì (formerly Ward 6), Thắng Tam, Nguyễn An Ninh, Rạch Dừa, and the commune (xã) of Long Sơn.

The wards were divided into quarters (khu phố), which were divided into smaller community groups (tổ dân phố). The commune was divided into hamlets (thôn).

== Economy and tourism ==
=== Industry of manufacturing, shipping and oil exploration ===
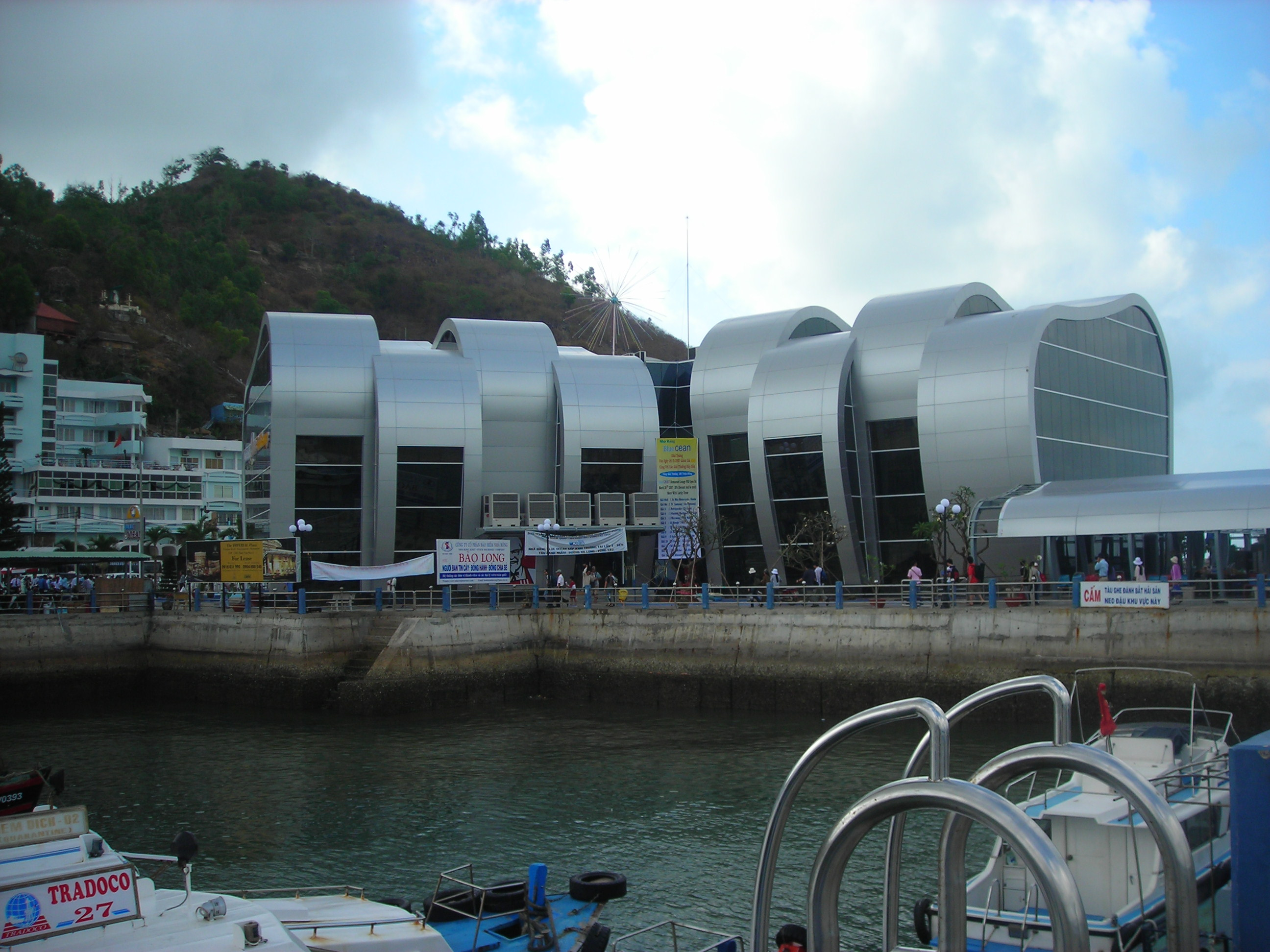
Vũng Tàu Hydrofoil Fast Ferry Station, an architectural landmark of the city

The city is located in the south of Vietnam, situated at the tip of a small peninsula. It has traditionally been a significant port, particularly during Vietnam's period of French rule. Today, the city's importance as a shipping port has diminished, but it still plays a significant role in Vietnam's offshore oil industry. Vũng Tàu is the only petroleum base of Vietnam where crude oil and natural gas exploitation activities dominate the city's economy and contribute principal income to Vietnam's budget and export volume. Vũng Tàu shipyard's reconstruction was scheduled to be completed in 2008, supplied with up-to-date anchor handling supply vessels of Aker.

The city currently has two large industrial zones: Đông Xuyên Industrial Zone (160 ha), where PEB Steel operates several factories in here, and Long Sơn Oil and Gas Industrial Zone (1,250 ha), where the Long Sơn oil refinery and Southern petrochemical complex projects are underway. In addition, the city has more than 10 seaports and river ports serving the oil and gas, defense, shipbuilding, and import/export industries. The city is also currently implementing the Sao Mai–Bến Đình International Container Transshipment Port project.

=== Beaches, resorts and theme parks ===
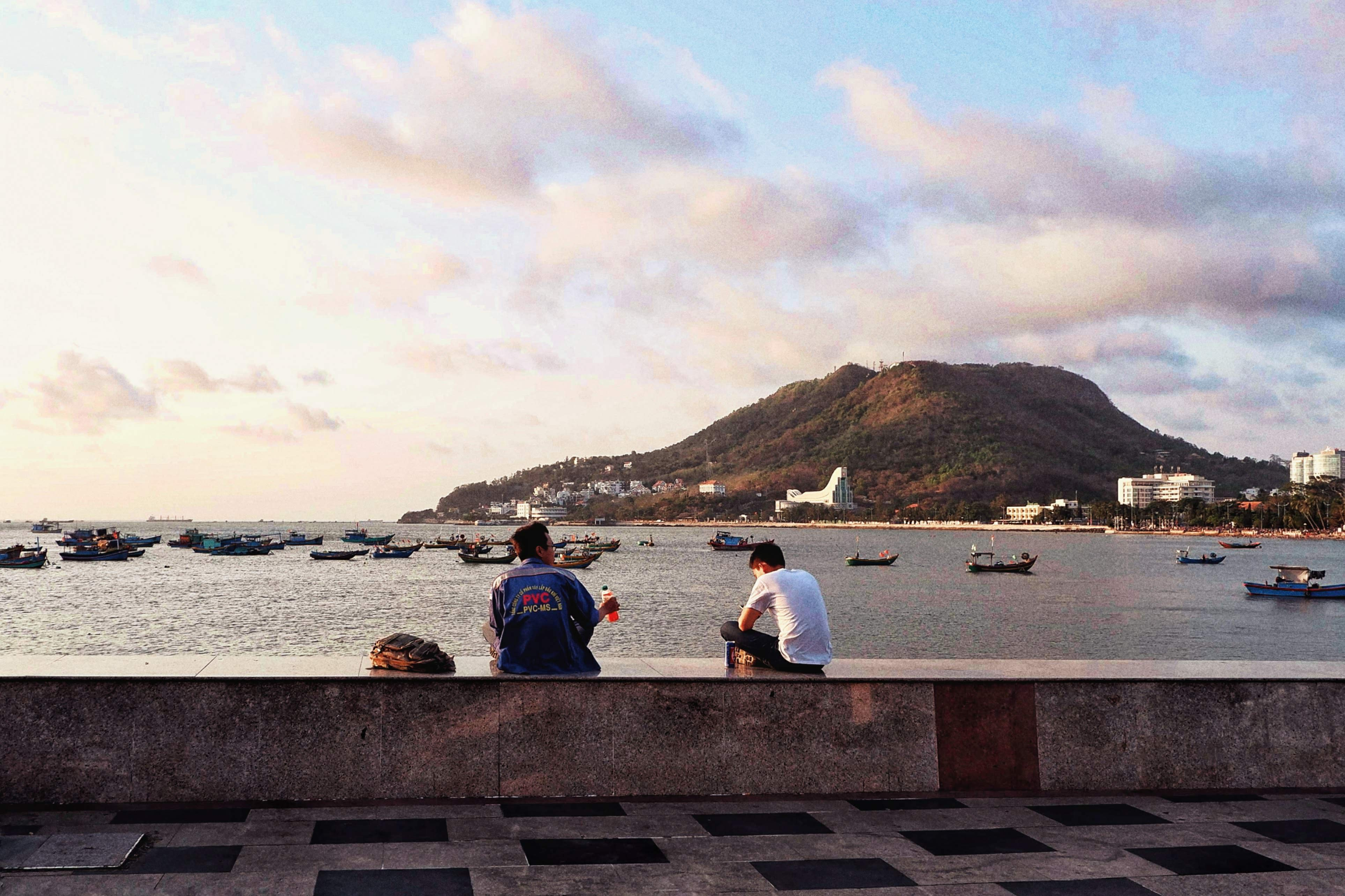
Vũng Tàu Front Beach and Tương Kỳ Mountain seen from Hạ Long Road seashore

Vũng Tàu has 4 extensive beaches, including Back Beach (Bãi Sau), Front Beach (Bãi Trước), Strawberry Beach (Bãi Dâu), Pineapple Beach (Bãi Dứa).

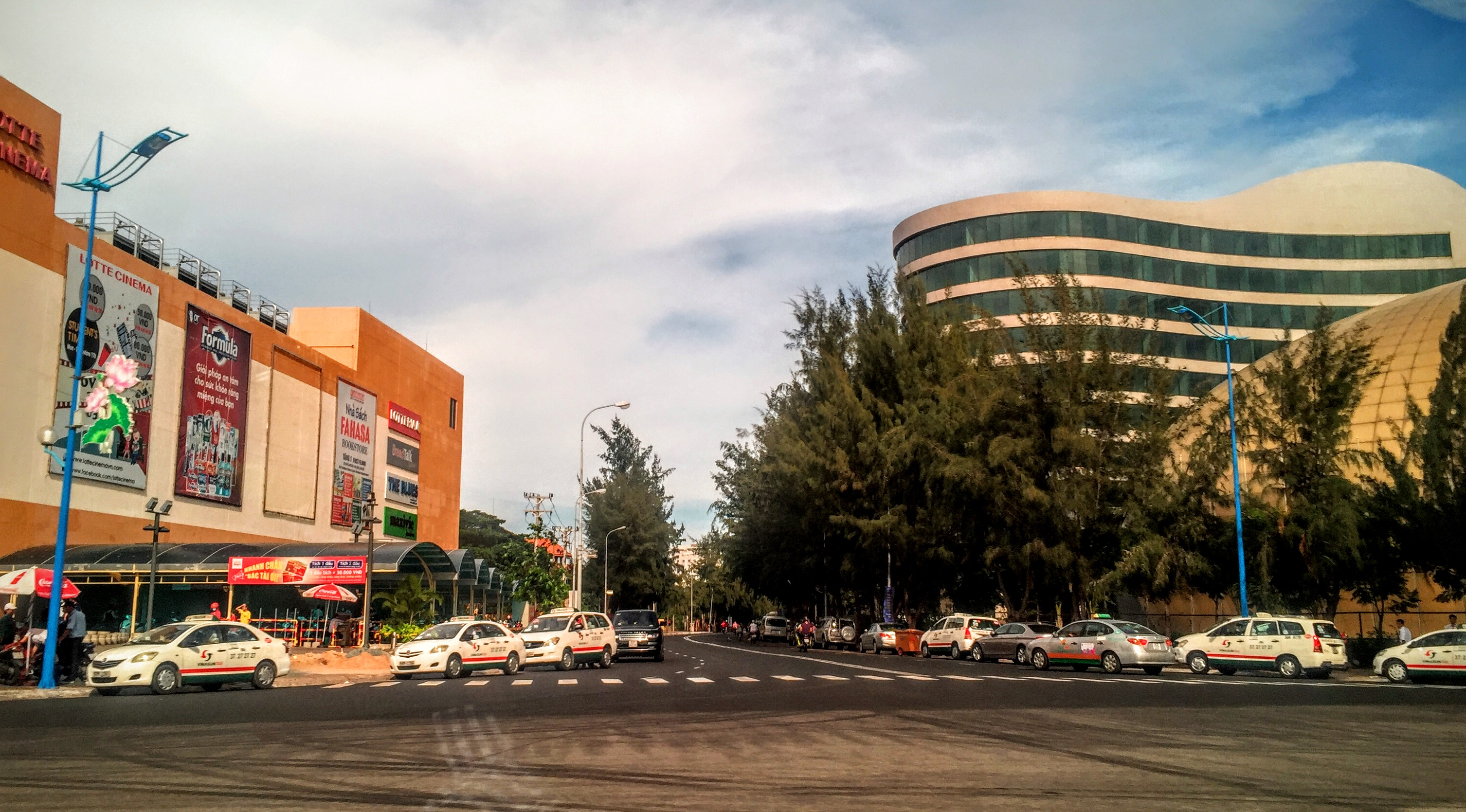
Lotte Mart (left) and Pullman Vũng Tàu Hotel (right)

The has been a major tourist site since the time of Cochinchina. It was developed as a seaside tourist city with many hospitality facilities. Nowadays, besides the domestic hotel brands, the city is also home to some international hotel brands, including Pullman, Ibis, Mercure (all are under Accor), Fusion Suites (Fusion Hotel Group).

Blanca City, a resort and waterpark developed Sun Group on March 2nd Boulevard, Ward 10 (Tam Thắng), near the Chí Linh Centre area was groundbroken on May 16, 2025. The waterpark has opened since Tết 2026. The resort is still under construction, and the project will also provide space for international hotels.

Another large resort project was licensed by the Vietnamese government, the Saigon Atlantis, located at Chí Linh – Cửa Lấp area, along the March 2nd Boulevard, Ward 11 & 12 (Tam Thắng), next to Long Hải. Upon completion, this entertainment project worth US$300 million in capital investment will include resorts, shopping and sailing. The investor of this project is proposing to raise the investment capital to US$4 billion. Two other noteworthy entertainment projects awaiting licensing are Vũng Tàu Aquarium, which will cost US$250 million, and Bàu Trũng, a Disneyland-like entertainment park which will cost US$250 million. The project includes Landmark Tower, an 88-story skyscraper proposed to be built and completed by 2010 in Vũng Tàu by a USA-based company, Good Choice Import – Export Investment Inc, once built will likely be the highest building in Vietnam. The project is under consideration for approval by the local provincial government.

== Culture ==
=== Local traditions and festivals ===
As a coastal city, Vũng Tàu's culture is deeply rooted in its connection to the sea and maritime heritage. Descendants of the original Tam Thắng villages in Vũng Tàu usually celebrate temple feasts, which are hosted once a year. A sizeable number of fishermen, particularly those living near Thắng Tam village temple also celebrate holidays related to fishing and the sea, with Lễ hội Cá Ông (Whale Festival) or Lễ hội Nghinh Ông (Whale Celebration Festival) being most prominent. Other festivals in the region include the Kite Festival and World Food Festival Culture.

Sea Festivals are modern festival activities including a wide range of activities such as beach sports competition, seafood fairs, music concerts and cultural exhibitions. Contrary to traditional feasts, this festival is usually held in summer months and aims to promote tourism and foster community spirit.

Australian tourists come to Vũng Tàu in August to mark the anniversary of the Battle of Long Tân.

=== Religion ===
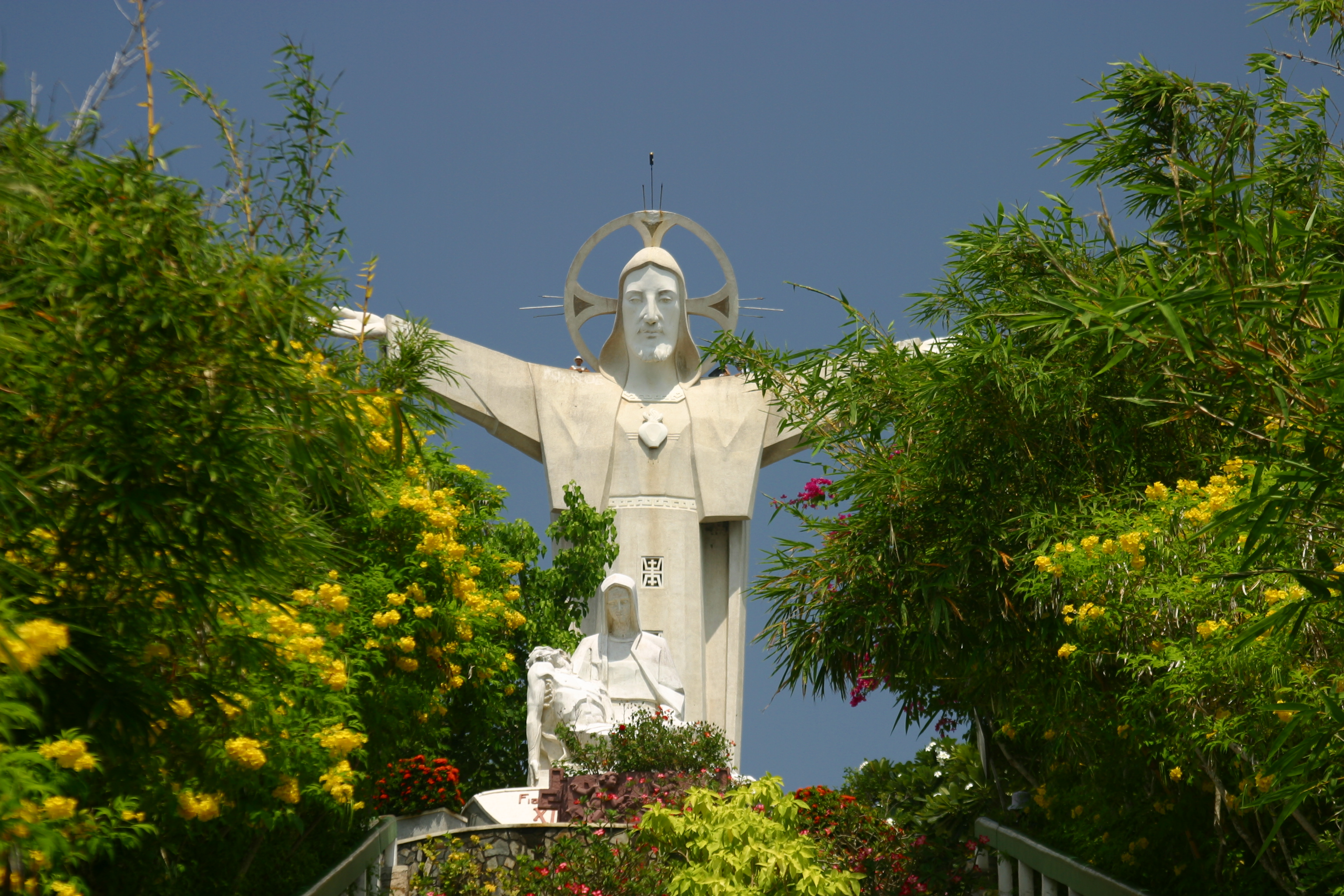
A 32m-high statue of Jesus extending his 18.3m-long arms on the top of 170m-high Small Mount (Núi Nhỏ)

As in most provinces and cities in Vietnam, Buddhism is the predominant religion. Mahayana Buddhism, the dominant form of the religion in Vietnam, was brought to Bà Rịa-Vũng Tàu by the Vietnamese settlers from the north at the beginning of the 17th century during the expansion of the Nguyễn lords. When they came bringing their original religion they built many Buddhist pagodas, temples and statues in the city. Three Buddhist temples in particular, Thích Ca Phật Đài, Phổ Đà Sơn Quan Âm Bồ Tát Tự Temple, and Niết Bàn Tịnh Xá temple, draw pilgrims from around the country.

Before the area was settled by ethnic Vietnamese, the Khmer people practiced Theravada Buddhism. The area has some 14 Catholic wards with active services. A notable monument in the city is the Christ of Vũng Tàu, a large statue built by Vietnam's Catholic minority. It was completed in 1974, with the height of 32 metres and two outstretched arms spanning 18.4 metres. It is among the tallest statues of Christ in Asia.

There has been a Russian village in Vũng Tàu ever since the Soviet era; these Russians generally worked for the Russian-Vietnamese joint venture Vietsovpetro. It is believed that these "Russians", or "citizens of the former Soviet Union", were once the most dominant group of foreigners in Vũng Tàu. Some have remained in Vũng Tàu after the dissolution of the Soviet Union. They formed a parish of the Russian Orthodox Church.

One of the Vietnamese whale worship sites, the Lăng Ông Nam Hải Whale Temple, hosts a skeleton of a whale, being respected in the name of Nam Hai General, a whale god. Nam Hai General is said to govern the ocean and protect people from evils, monsters, and disasters, and an annual festival is held in recognition.

=== Cuisine ===
Vũng Tàu's local culinary scene presents a strong emphasis on fresh seafood and local flavours.

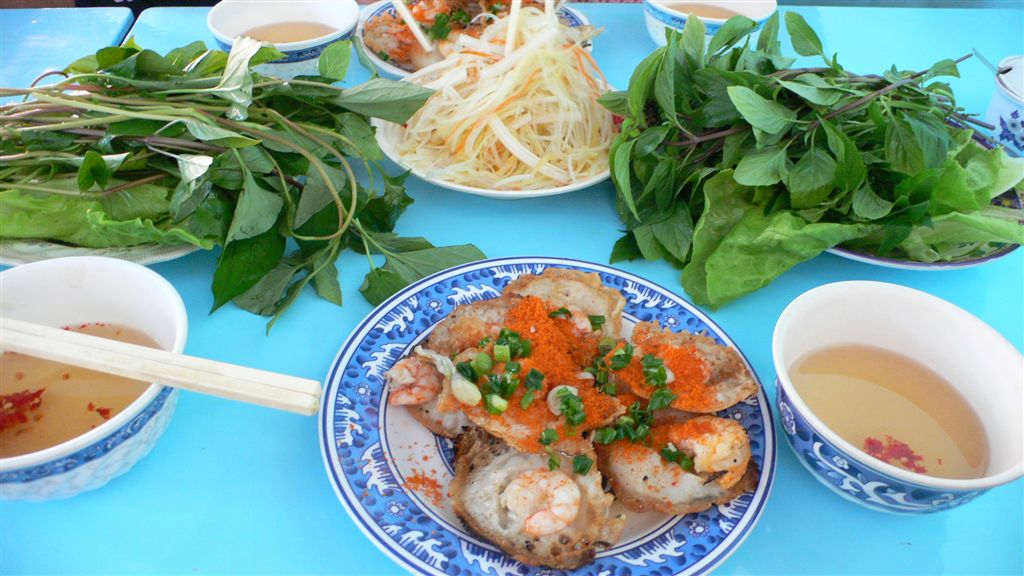
Vung Tau style Bánh khọt

Bánh khọt are small round savoury pancakes made from rice flour, coconut milk and turmeric, usually topped with shrimps, green unions and shrimp powder. Vung Tau has its own variety that is more crispy and has shrimp added on top.

Bánh xèo Vũng Tàu are pancakes famous for its taste which cannot be found in anywhere. Ingredients include rice flour, shrimp, pork, bean sprouts but it tastes is more significant thanks to the crust made from fresh chicken eggs, and the filling full of onions and mushrooms.

Lẩu cá đuối (stingray hotpots) is a hotpot dish featuring stingray as the main ingredient. This is usually cooked with various vegetables, herbs and a tangy broth.

Snails and sea snails: are street food dishes comprising various snails that are often steamed or grilled and served with a variety of dipping sauces.

=== Art and music ===
Traditional music in Vũng Tàu reflect the cultural heritage and history of the southern Vietnamese region. Common traditional music includes đờn ca tài tử, cải lương, tuồng and various folk songs.

== Transport ==
From Hồ Chí Minh City, it takes about two hours to reach Vũng Tàu by road (Route 51), and two and a half hours by high speed ferry, or one and a half hours by car on the freeway (Ho Chi Minh City–Long Thanh–Dau Giay Expressway and Bien Hoa–Vung Tau Expressway). The city does have its own airport but it only provides helicopter services to the island of Côn Đảo. However, air travel is now mainly provided by Hồ Chí Minh City's Tan Son Nhat International Airport which is located 92 km northwest of the city and the new Long Thanh International Airport located 60 km, also in the northwest, expected to be served in 2026.

== Twin towns – sister cities ==
Vũng Tàu is twinned with:

- Battambang, Cambodia
- Baku, Azerbaijan
- Ganja, Azerbaijan
- Ha Long, Vietnam
- Padang, Indonesia
- Parramatta, Australia

A street in Baku is named after Vũng Tàu as 'Vunqtau', while Vũng Tàu has a street named Baku as 'Ba Cu'. This commemorates the cooperation in petroleum extraction between Soviet Azerbaijani and Vietnamese specialists in Vũng Tàu in the 1980s.
