= PEB =

Peb or PEB may refer to: personal examination bankrupt

== Organisations ==
- École secondaire de Par-en-Bas, a Canadian French high school
- PEB Steel, Vietnamese
- Physical Evaluation Board of US Navy Department
- PLUS Expressways Berhad, Malaysia

== Technology and engineering ==
- Process Environment Block in Windows NT family
- Pre-engineered building, in structural engineering

== People ==
- Techmaster P.E.B., American Miami bass DJ
- Pierre Bellocq (born 1926), French-American artist and cartoonist known as "Peb"
- Pierre-Édouard Bellemare, professional ice hockey player for the Tampa Bay Lightning of the National Hockey League

== Other uses ==
- Eastern Pomo language (ISO 639-3 code)
- Pevensey Bay railway station, a railway station in Sussex, England
