= Gò Găng Island =

Gò Găng Island Đảo Gò Găng Village 9 (Thôn 9)
- Village
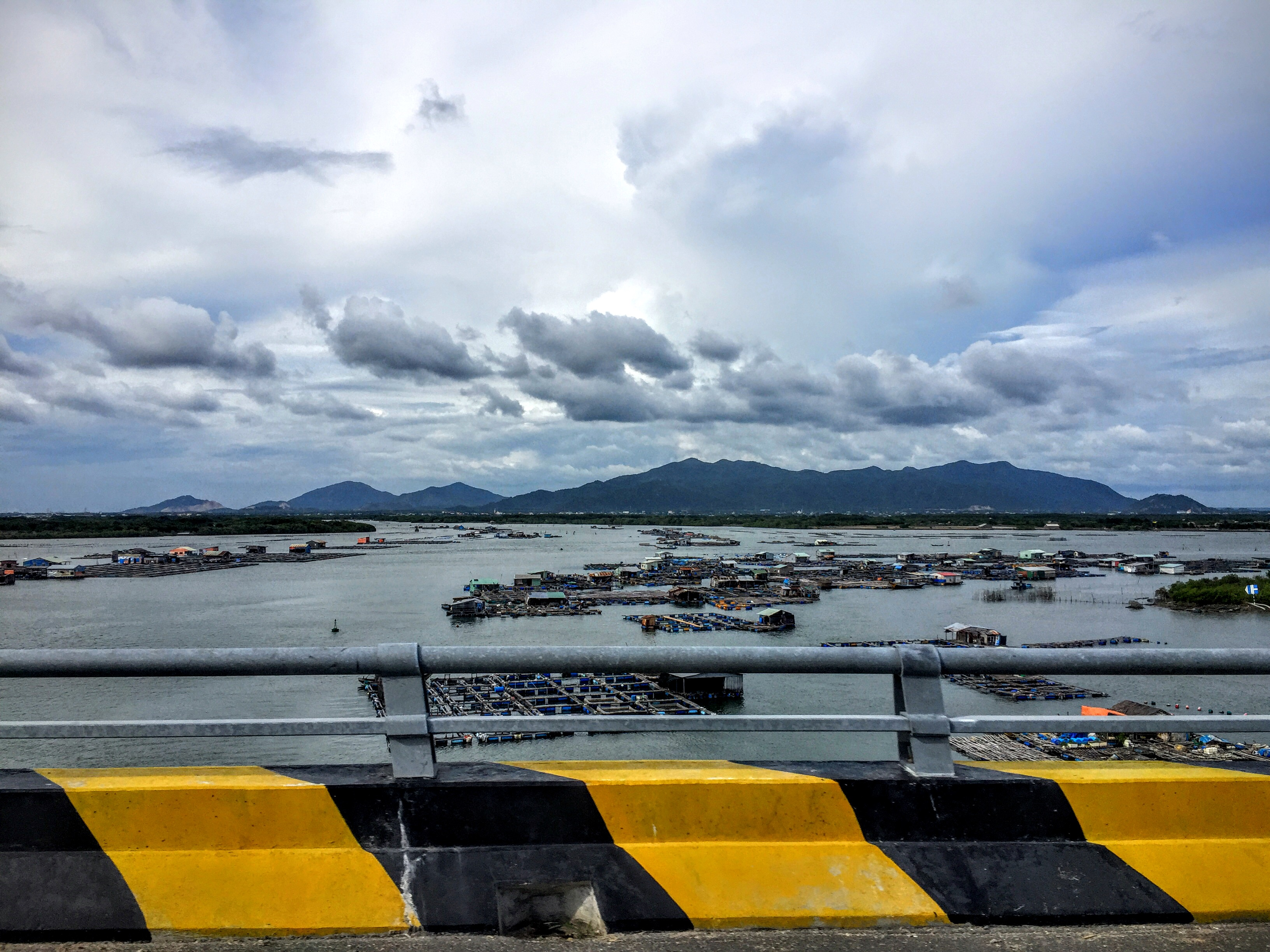
- Dinh river and Dinh hills seen from Gò Găng Bridge on Trường Sa Street (Provincial Road 994)

- Location within Vietnam
- Country: Vietnam
- Region: Southeast
- Municipality: Ho Chi Minh City
- Commune: Long Sơn

Area
  - Total: 30 km^{2} (12 sq mi)
- Time zone: UTC+7 (Indochina Time)

Gò Găng (Vietnamese: đảo Gò Găng) is an island that is part of the islandic commune of Long Sơn in Ho Chi Minh City, Vietnam.

Administratively, the island is entirely in Village 9 of the commune.

== Geography ==
Gò Găng Island is located in the Long Sơn commune, a suburban area of Vũng Tàu and is about 3 km away in southwest of the city center. The 30km^{2} island borders rivers on three sides and the sea on another. Surrounded by tributaries of the Thị Vải River and Dinh River, its topography includes also a system of forests, ponds, and lakes. On the west is the neighbor Long Sơn Island, both the islands are connected by Chà Và Bridge. On the East, the island is connected to the urban area of Vũng Tàu City through Gò Găng Bridge on Trường Sa Street to continue on National Route 51.

== Development ==
Historically, Go Gang has been a relatively deserted island featuring minimal infrastructure, with a boat required to travel to the island and no connections to municipal water or electricity. By 2005, the Go Gang bridge projects began to stimulate economic development and investment. With the construction of Gò Găng Bridge on Provincial Road 994 (now is Trường Sa Street) connecting into National Highway 51, living and conducting business on the island became a more viable prospect. Wind power stations were introduced in September 2011 to alleviate poverty. In 2015, re-zoning plans were reviewed for the island to assess whether lang development would be possible without deeply damaging the island's natural habitat.

In 2020, officials of the Bà Rịa–Vũng Tàu province established their intent towards making the island its centerpiece for a new economic zone that would emphasize sustainable development by zoning 57% of the island for urban construction. This would include housing, shopping complexes, a local fishing center, and other infrastructure. The plan would also have housing for 65,000 residents on the island.

== Gò Găng Airport ==
In 2020, official plans were announced for a new Gò Găng airport covering 248.5 hectares southwest of Gành Rái Bay and northwest of the Chà Và River. Its aim is to replace the Vũng Tàu Airport in order to increase capacity for travel and tourism. A site has been approved for the construction of the airport.
