= Rạch Dừa =

Rạch Dừa Phường Rạch Dừa Thắng Nhứt
- Ward
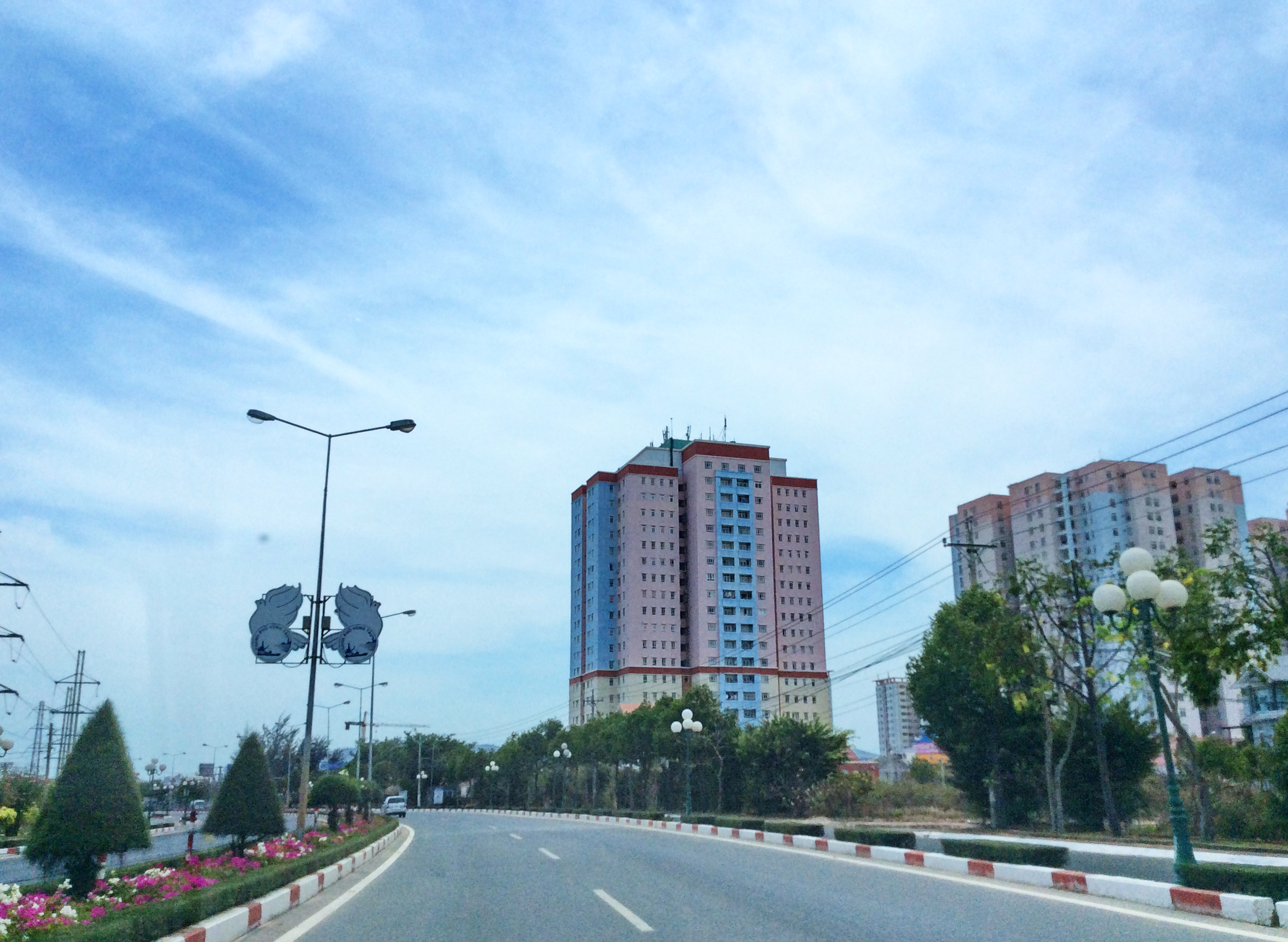
- A road in Rạch Dừa
- Interactive map of Rạch Dừa
- Coordinates: 10°23′53″N 107°06′50″E
- Country: Vietnam
- Municipality: Ho Chi Minh City
- Established: June 16, 2025

Area
  - Total: 7.61 sq mi (19.70 km^{2})

Population (2024)
  - Total: 76,281
  - Density: 10,030/sq mi (3,872/km^{2})
- Time zone: UTC+07:00 (Indochina Time)
- Administrative code: 26536

Rạch Dừa (Vietnamese: Phường Rạch Dừa) is a ward of Ho Chi Minh City, Vietnam. It is one of the 168 new wards, communes and special zones of the city following the reorganization in 2025.

== Geography ==
According to Official Dispatch No. 2896/BNV-CQĐP dated May 27, 2025 of the Ministry of Home Affairs, following the merger, Rạch Dừa has a land area of 19.70 km², the population as of December 31, 2024 is 76,281 people, the population density is 3,872 people/km².

== History ==
On June 16, 2025, the National Assembly Standing Committee issued Resolution No. 1685/NQ-UBTVQH15 on the arrangement of commune-level administrative units of Ho Chi Minh City in 2025 (effective from June 16, 2025). Accordingly, the entire land area and population of Ward 10, Thắng Nhất and Rạch Dừa wards of the former Vũng Tàu city will be integrated into a new ward named Rạch Dừa (Clause 104, Article 1).
