= Vung Tau Airport =

Airport in Vietnam

Vung Tau Airport Sân bay Vũng Tàu
- IATA: VTG; ICAO: VVVT

Summary
- Airport type: Public
- Operator: Southern Service Flight Company
- Serves: Vung Tau
- Location: Tam Thang Ward, Ho Chi Minh City, Vietnam
- Coordinates: 10°22′13″N 107°05′36″E

Map
- Location of airport in Vietnam

Runways
Direction	Length		Surface
Direction	m	ft	Surface
18/36	1,800	5,906
12/30	693	2,274
- Sources: GCM, STV

Vung Tau Airport (IATA: VTG, ICAO: VVVT) is a small airport in southern Vietnam, in Ho Chi Minh City. It serves the former city of Vũng Tàu and is located near the downtown of the city.

== Facilities ==
There is a 1,800 m paved runway (as of 2006). The airport is capable of handling small aircraft such as ATR-72 and AN-38.

== History ==
The airport was originally established as Cap St Jacques Airfield in the French colonial period.

== Airlines and destinations ==
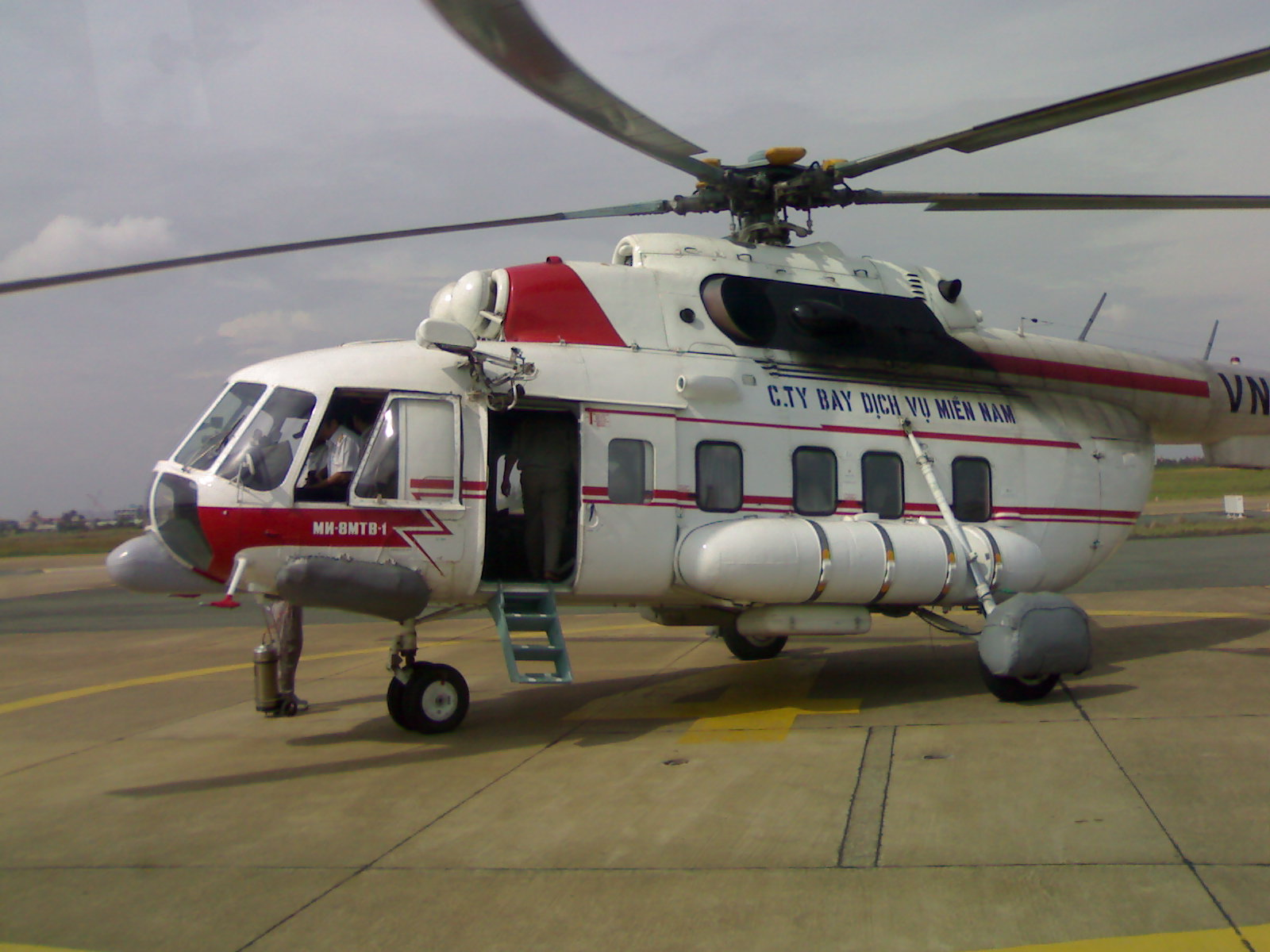
Southern Service Flight Company Mil Mi-8 helicopter at Vung Tau Airport

The Southern Service Flight Company provides helicopter services for petroleum exploration and production activities offshore of Vũng Tàu.

== See also ==
- Vung Tau
- List of airports in Vietnam
