= Christ of Vũng Tàu =

Statue in Vũng Tàu, Vietnam

Coordinates: 10.3264°N 107.084°E

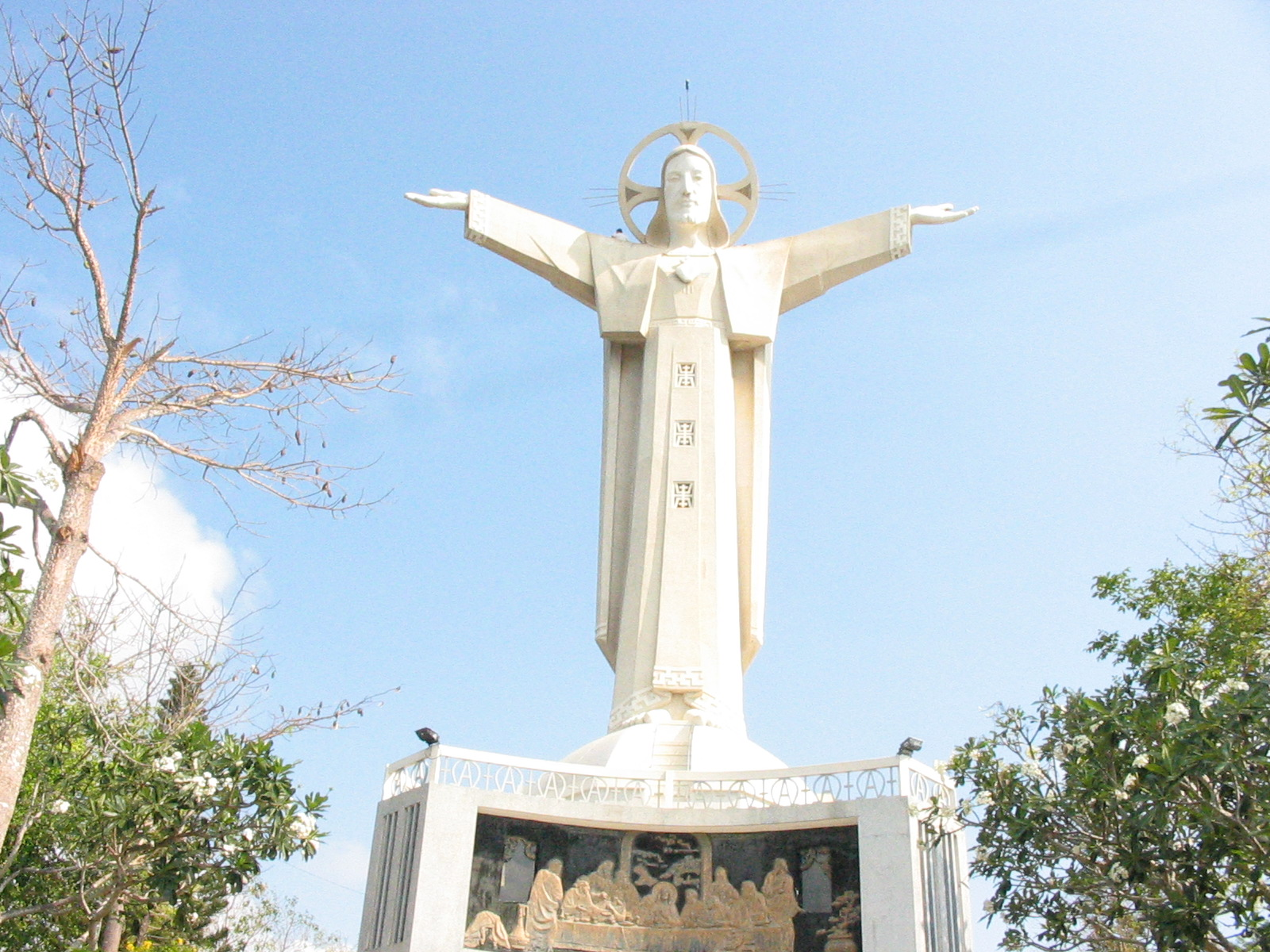
Christ of Vũng Tàu is 32 metres (105 ft) high statue of Jesus extending his 18.3 metres (60 ft) long arms on the top of 170 metres (558 ft) high Nho Mount in Vũng Tàu

Christ the King of Vũng Tàu (Vietnamese: Tượng Chúa Kitô Vua, lit. 'Statue of Christ the King') is a statue of Jesus, standing on Mount Nhỏ in Vũng Tàu, Ho Chi Minh City, Vietnam. The Vietnamese Catholic Church built the statue in 1974 and it was completed on 2 December 1994.

It is 32 metres (105 ft) high, standing on a 4 metres (13 ft) high platform, for a 36 metres (118 ft) total monument height with two outstretched arms spanning 18.3 metres (60 ft). There is a 133-step staircase inside the statue.

The statue is the largest Christian statue across Asia since 2012, and since its restoration in 1993, it has been a major pilgrim destination for Christians across Vietnam as well as Christian vacationers.

== See also ==
- List of statues of Jesus
- List of tallest statues
