= Long Sơn =

Long Sơn Xã Long Sơn
- Commune
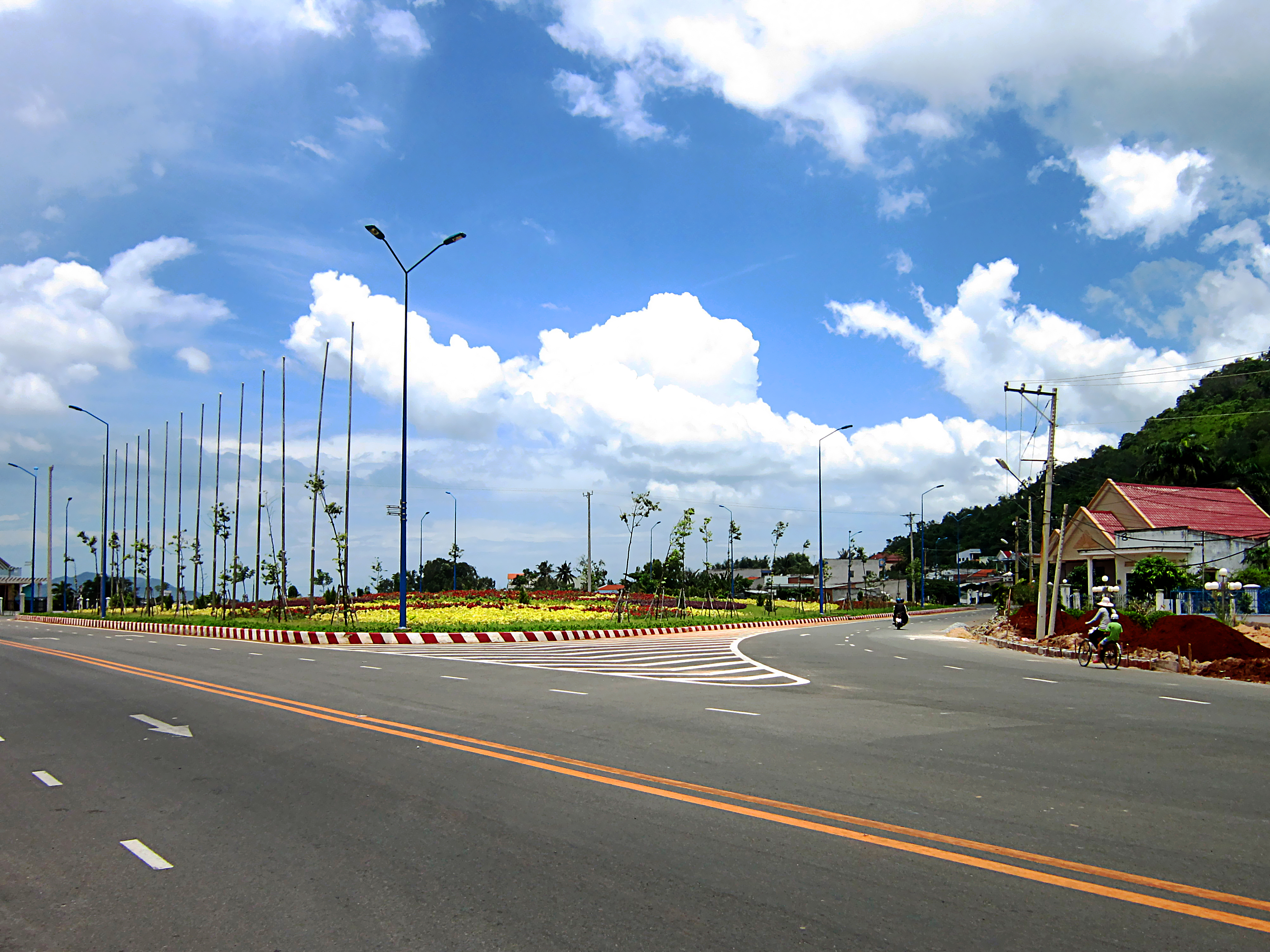
- A road in Long Sơn
- Interactive map of Long Sơn
- Coordinates: 10°27′46″N 107°04′49″E
- Country: Vietnam
- Municipality: Ho Chi Minh City
- Established: June 16, 2025

Area
  - Total: 21.81 sq mi (56.50 km^{2})

Population (2024)
  - Total: 17,767
  - Density: 814.4/sq mi (314.5/km^{2})
- Time zone: UTC+07:00 (Indochina Time)
- Administrative code: 26545

Long Sơn is an island commune in Ho Chi Minh City, Vietnam. Following the administrative reorganization in 2025, it became one of the 168 new wards, communes, and special zones integrated into the municipality from the former Bà Rịa–Vũng Tàu province.

The commune lies north of Vũng Tàu, it consists of Long Sơn Island and Gò Găng Island.

== Geography ==
Long Sơn is an island coastal commune located in the southern part of Ho Chi Minh City, approximately 13 km west of Bà Rịa ward, 25 km north of Vũng Tàu ward, and 75 km southeast of Sài Gòn ward. It comprises a main island along the slope of Núi Nứa, the end of the Phước Hòa mountain range extending into the sea, and a smaller island called Đảo Gò Găng. The commune is connected to Phước Thắng ward via the Chà Và bridge and Cầu Gò Găng, and to Tân Hải ward via the Bà Nanh bridge. It features a mix of mountains, forests, rivers, and sea, with a total area of 56.50 km² and a population of 17,767 as of December 31, 2024, resulting in a density of 314 people per km².

== History ==
The area of Long Sơn has roots in ancient times, with evidence of the Óc Eo culture from the 1st to 6th centuries AD. During French colonial rule, it belonged to Núi Nứa village in An Phú Tân commune, Bà Rịa province. It was later renamed Sơn Long village. In 1956, under the Republic of Vietnam, it became part of Phước Tuy province. On February 1, 1960, it was officially renamed Long Sơn commune. After 1975, it was under Châu Thành district in Đồng Nai province, then transferred to the Vũng Tàu–Côn Đảo special zone in 1979. Since August 12, 1991, it has been part of Vũng Tàu city. In 2025, following Resolution No. 1685/NQ-UBTVQH15, Long Sơn was integrated into Ho Chi Minh City without changes to its area or population.

== Administration ==
Long Sơn is divided into 10 villages (thôn).

== Economy ==
The economy of Long Sơn centers on aquaculture, particularly oyster farming, which has become a signature specialty attracting tourists. The commune also hosts the Long Sơn Petrochemical Complex, a $5 billion USD project by SCG, which is Vietnam's first integrated petrochemical facility. This complex, operational since 2024 with pauses for upgrades, contributes significantly to industrial development and is expected to generate $1.5 billion USD annually. Additional activities include fishing, with floating fish farms, and emerging tourism focused on seafood and eco-experiences. Infrastructure projects, such as the expanded Trường Sa road and proposed ports, support logistics and industrial growth.

Environmental challenges have arisen, including fish die-offs attributed to pollution from industrial activities, leading to legal actions by residents.

== Culture ==
Long Sơn preserves unique cultural traditions, notably the Nhà Lớn Long Sơn (also known as Đền Ông Trần or Mr. Tran's Temple), an ancient-style architectural complex serving as a cultural and religious center for followers of the Ông Trần faith. The site includes townhouses, a market, pavilions, and lanterns, and hosts religious activities. A distinctive custom among residents is the reuse of a shared coffin for burials, where the deceased is buried within 24 hours, and the coffin is returned for future use—a practice over 100 years old.

The commune is also known for its seafood cuisine, particularly oysters, and attracts visitors for eco-tourism and village experiences.
