= PEB Steel =

Vietnamese construction company

PEB Steel Buildings Co., Ltd. (Pebsteel)
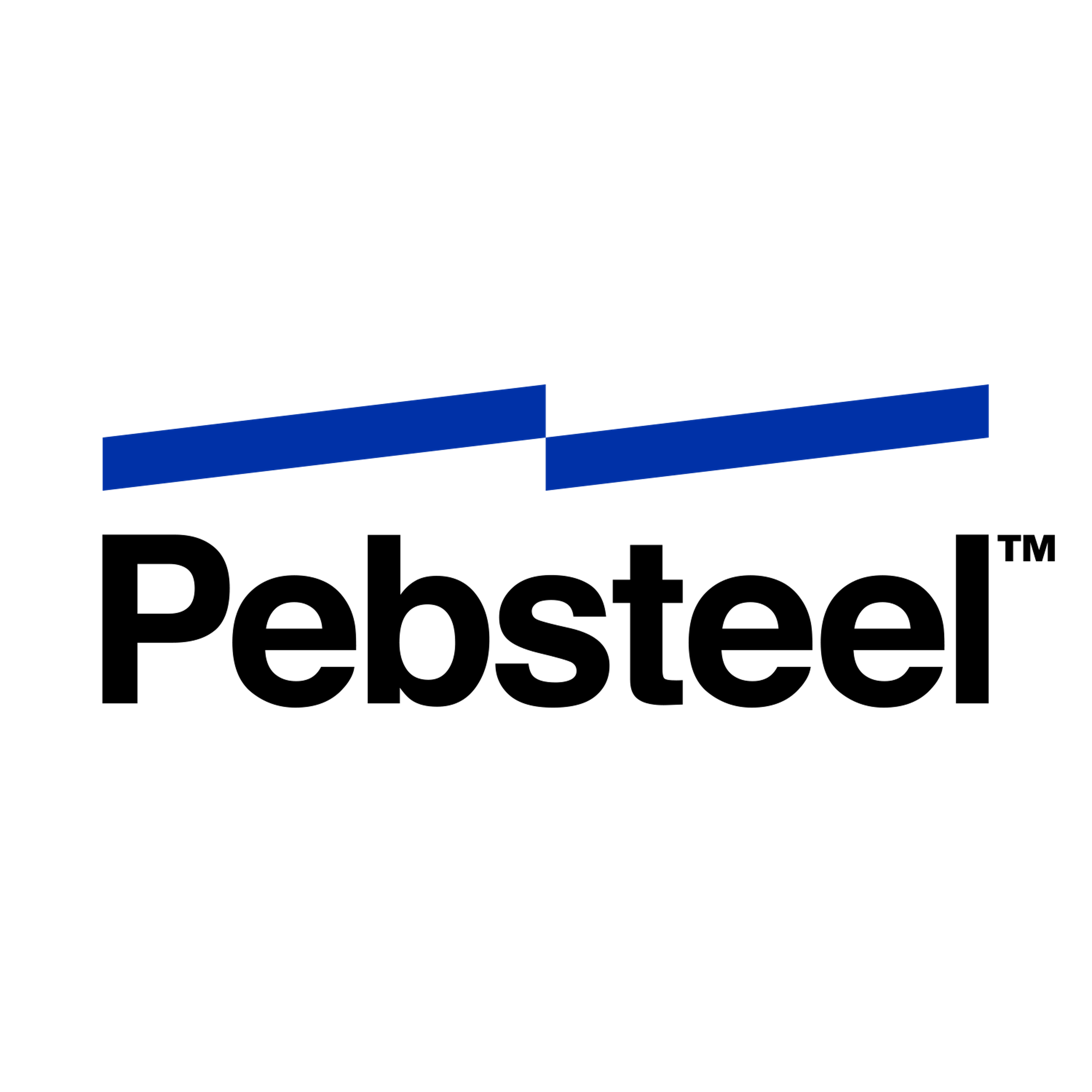
- Type: Multinational Corporation
- Industry: Construction, Manufacturing
- Founded: 1994
- Headquarters: Menas Mall Saigon Airport, 60A Truong Son St., Tan Binh Dist., Ho Chi Minh City, Vietnam
- Number of locations: 6
- Key people: Sami Kteily (Executive Chairman); Adib Kouteili (Director)
- Products: Pre Engineered Building; Steel Structure; Structural Steel
- Production output: 100,000 MT per year
- Services: Design, Fabrication, Erection
- Revenue: ▲US$ 100 million (2010)
- Number of employees: 1400
- Website: pebsteel.com

PEB Steel Buildings is a Vietnamese-based steel manufacturing and construction company which was established in 1999. The company specializes in the design, making and building of pre-engineered steel buildings.

The company's customers include Nike, an Adidas shoes manufacturer, Canon, Unilever, Samsung, Doosan, Aeon, Anheuser-Busch Inbev Brewery, Heineken, LG Electronics, Sapporo and Obayashi.

PEB steel structure buildings are widely used in industrial, commercial, agricultural and residential fields.

The company’s steel structures are used in industrial, commercial, agricultural, and residential sectors. Its product range includes industrial plants, warehouses, commercial buildings, stadiums, agricultural sheds, office buildings, and residential structures. The designs are flexible and can be customized to meet specific project requirements.

== Projects ==
PEB Steel Buildings has completed 6,000 buildings with varying functional purposes, including factories, warehouses and distribution centers, steel and paper mills, petrochemical plants, power stations, shipyards, spectator venues, sports centers, and multi-storey buildings.

The firm services a regional demand for the construction of steel buildings in Vietnam, Thailand, Cambodia, Malaysia, Bangladesh, India, Sri Lanka, Indonesia, Myanmar, the Philippines, and Pakistan. PEB Steel has also recently sold and constructed large projects to Qatar and Saudi Arabia.

== Other products ==
PEB Steel Buildings has developed, marketed, and installed other building-related products.

== Pebsteel's Factories ==
PEB Steel Buildings has seven factories in Asia. Six are located in Ba Ria-Vung Tau, Vietnam. PEB Steel has a joint venture with PEB Steel Lloyd factory in Pithampur, India with an area of 90,000 sqm.

PEB Steel Buildings fabricates steel structures at its own plant in Ba Ria-Vung Tau Province, Vietnam.

PEB Steel Buildings' fifth factory opened in 2009 and is located in Dong Xuyen Industrial Park, Ba Ria-Vung Tau Province. The plant increased production capacity in Vietnam by 18,000 MT, with total Asian capacity recorded at 120,000 MT annually.
