= Tam Thắng =

Tam Thắng Phường Tam Thắng
- Ward
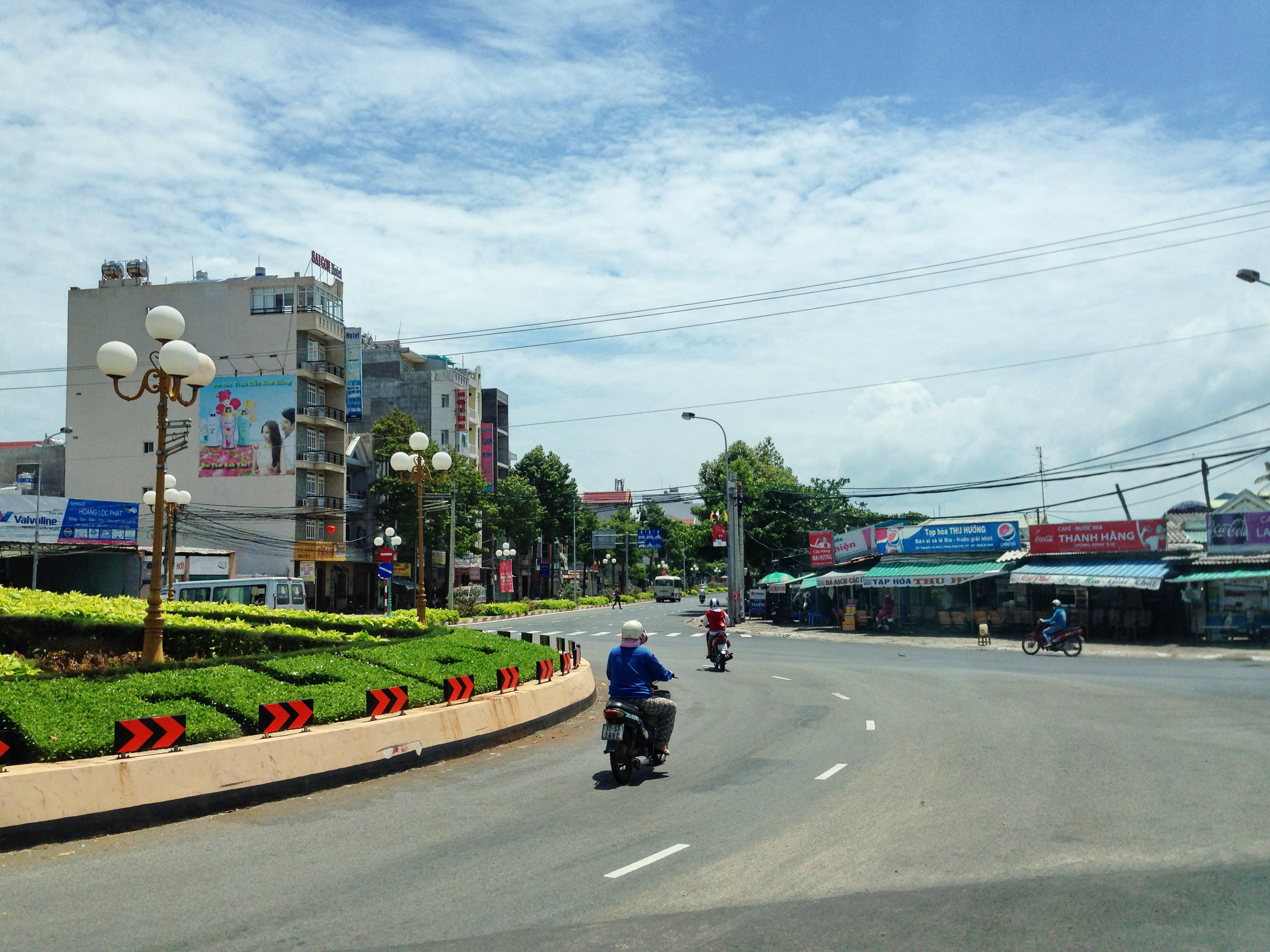
- Nguyễn An Ninh Street in Tam Thắng
- Interactive map of Tam Thắng
- Coordinates: 10°21′48″N 107°05′37″E
- Country: Vietnam
- Municipality: Ho Chi Minh City
- Established: June 16, 2025

Area
  - Total: 4.54 sq mi (11.76 km^{2})

Population (2024)
  - Total: 86,420
  - Density: 19,030/sq mi (7,349/km^{2})
- Time zone: UTC+07:00 (Indochina Time)
- Administrative code: 26526

Tam Thắng (Vietnamese: Phường Tam Thắng) is a ward of Ho Chi Minh City, Vietnam. It is one of the 168 new wards, communes and special zones of the city following the reorganization in 2025.

== Geography ==
According to Official Dispatch No. 2896/BNV-CQĐP dated May 27, 2025 of the Ministry of Home Affairs, following the merger, Tam Thắng has a land area of 11.76 km², the population as of December 31, 2024 is 86,420 people, the population density is 7,348 people/km².

== History ==
On June 16, 2025, the National Assembly Standing Committee issued Resolution No. 1685/NQ-UBTVQH15 on the arrangement of commune-level administrative units of Ho Chi Minh City in 2025 (effective from June 16, 2025). Accordingly, the entire land area and population of Ward 7, Ward 8, Ward 9 and Nguyễn An Ninh ward of the former Vũng Tàu city will be integrated into a new ward named Tam Thắng (Clause 103, Article 1).

== Gallery ==
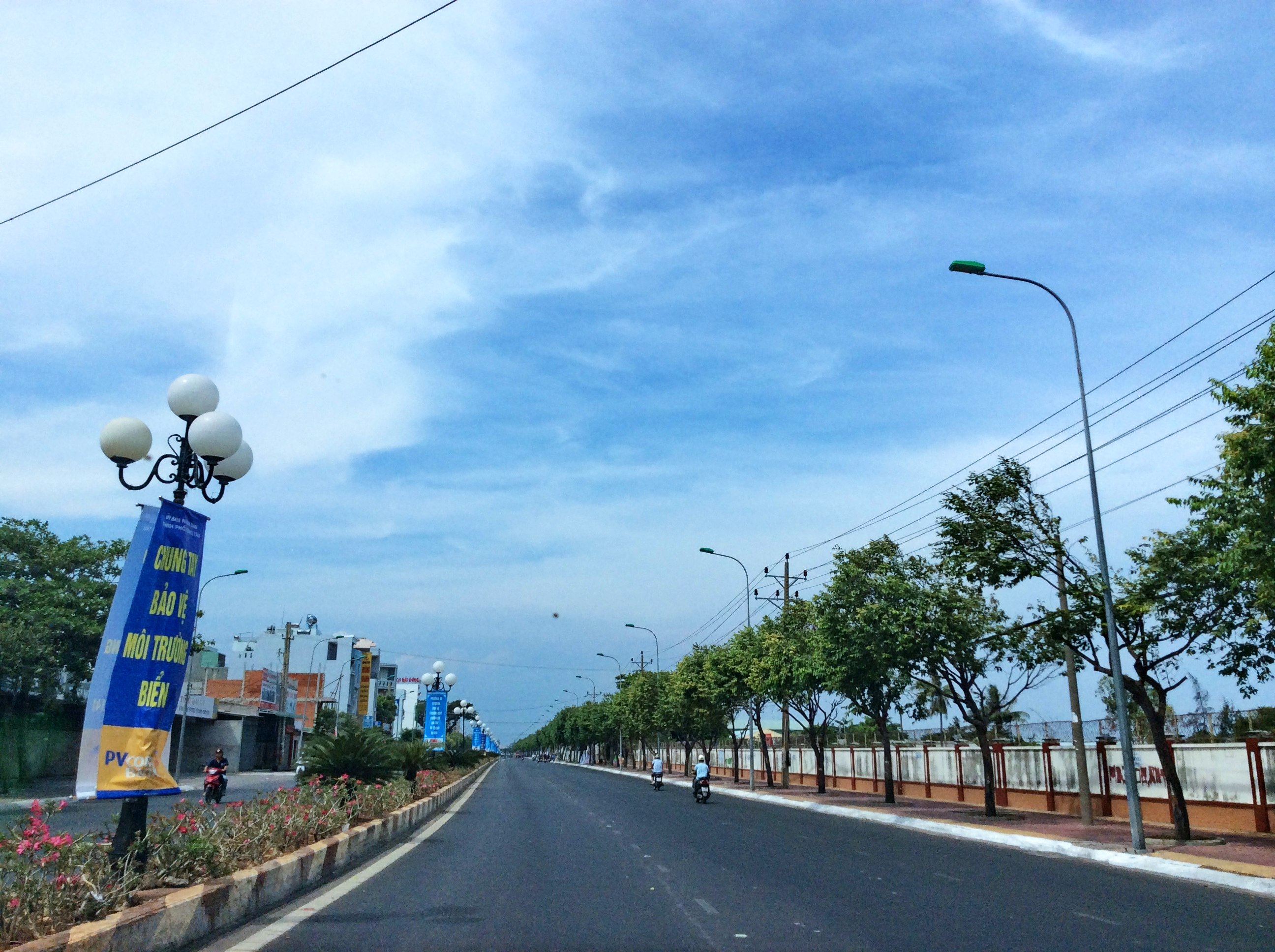
April 30th Road

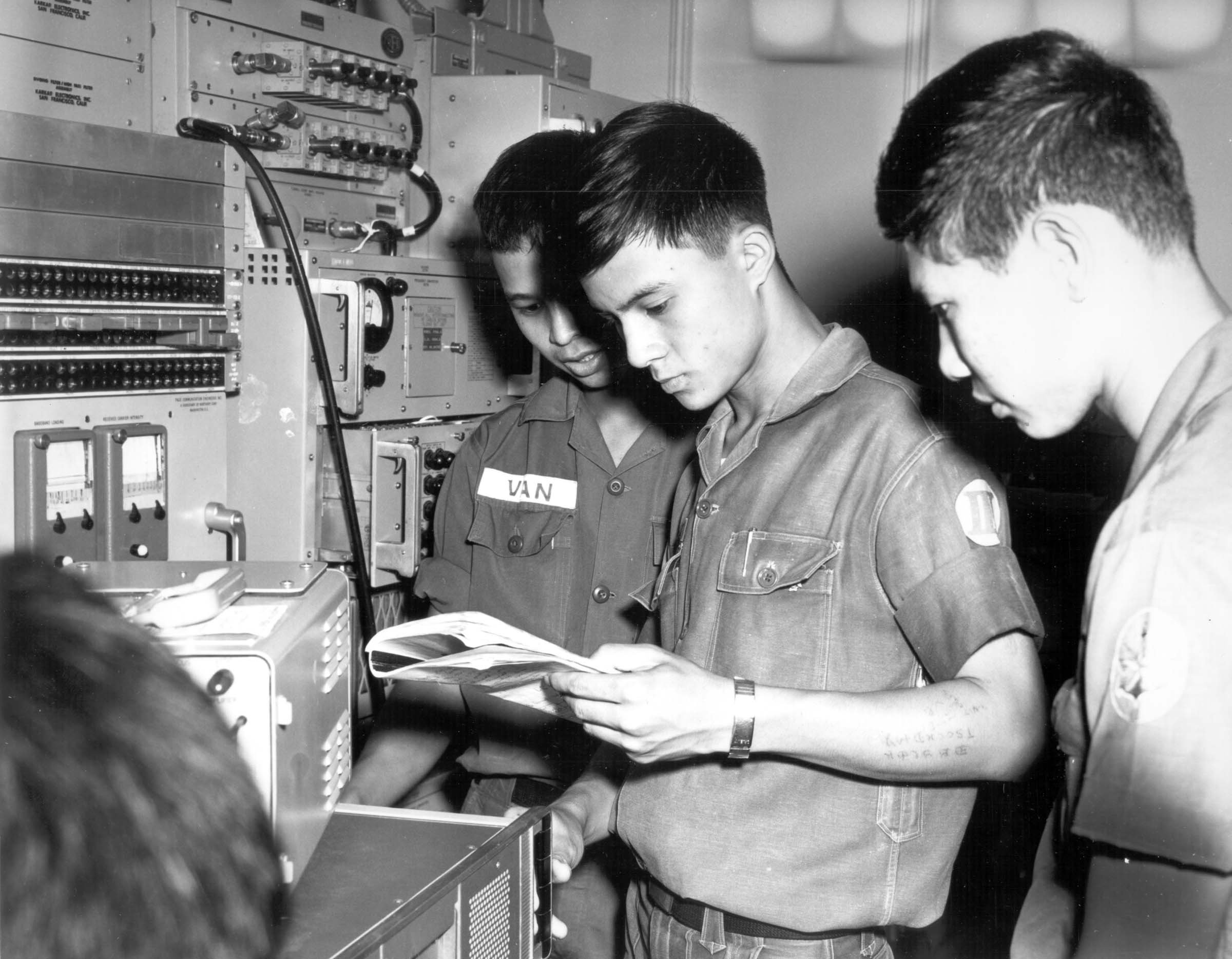
Students of the Vung Tau Communications School

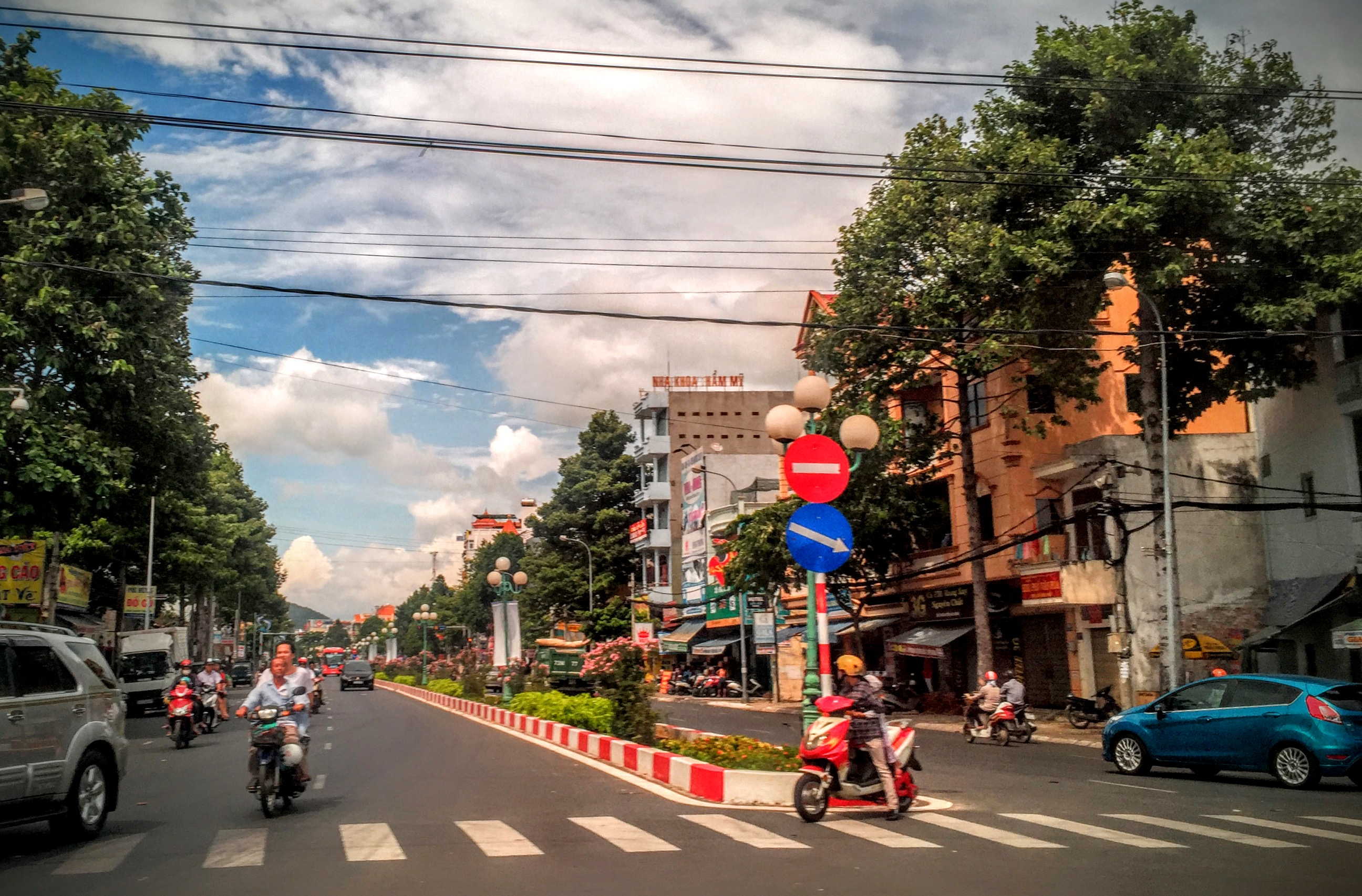
Nguyễn An Ninh Street
