= Transport in Vietnam =

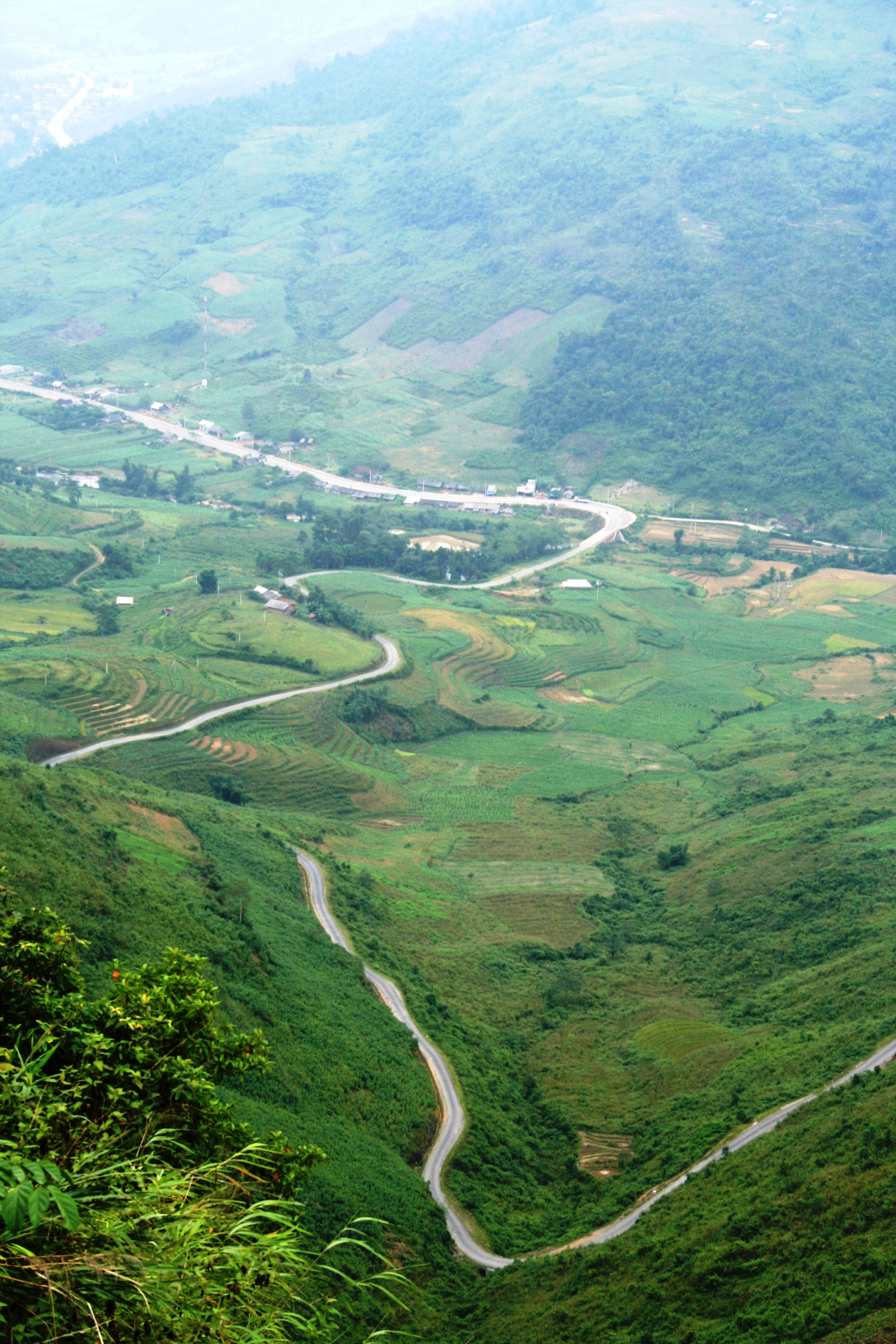
Bắc Sum Pass on National Road 4C

Transportation in Vietnam is improving rapidly in terms of both quantity and quality. Road traffic is growing rapidly but the major roads are dangerous and slow to travel on due to outdated design and an inappropriate traffic mix. In recent years, the construction of expressways has accelerated. Air travel is also important for long-distance travel. The two major metropolises of Hanoi and Ho Chi Minh City operate metro networks which are currently being expanded. Like most of the other ASEAN member states, Vietnam has historically under invested in public transit.

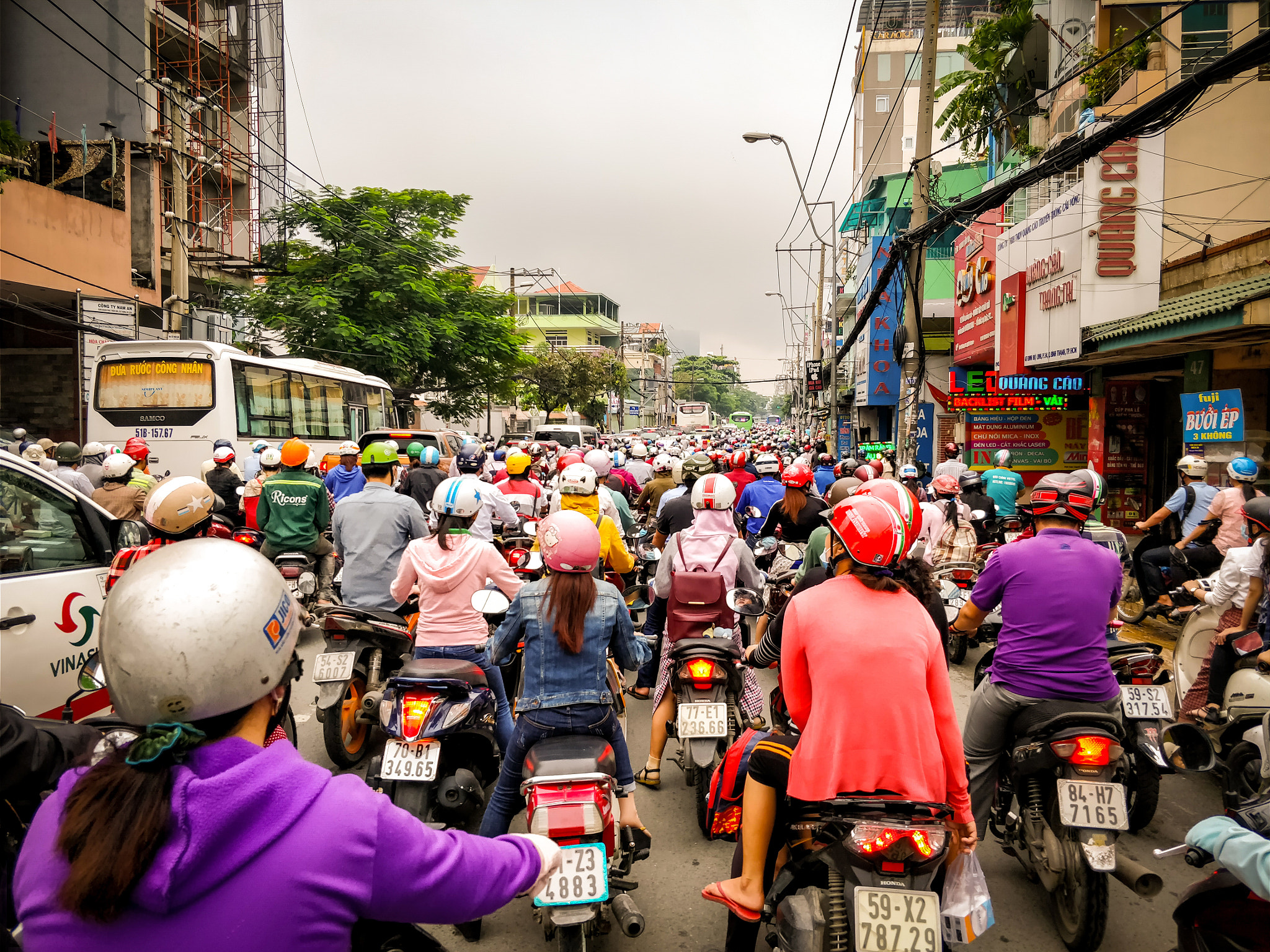
Vietnamese road traffic is dominated by motorcycles. Heavy traffic, bad air and loud noises are expected regularly.

== Road transport ==
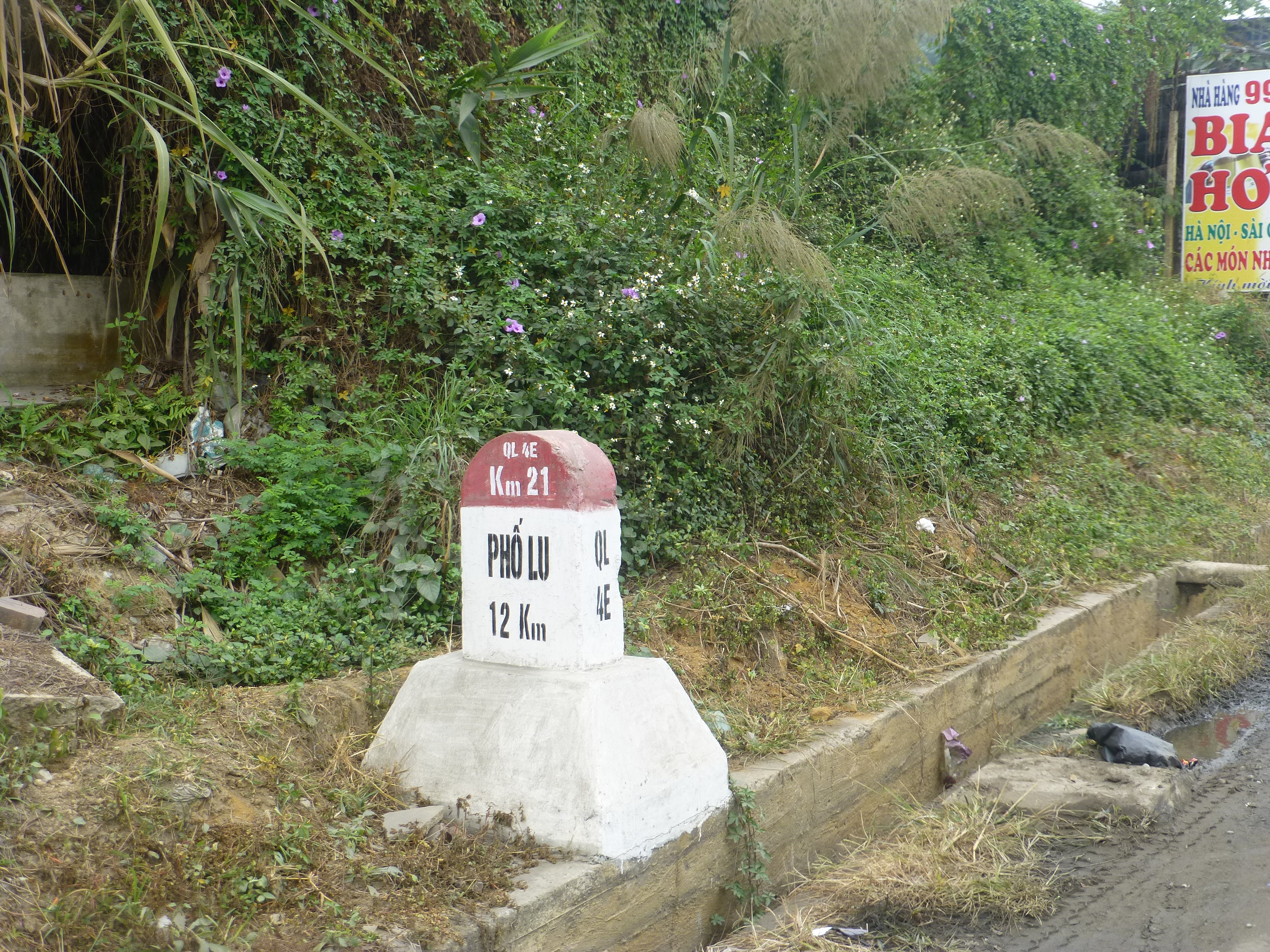
National Road 4E milestone

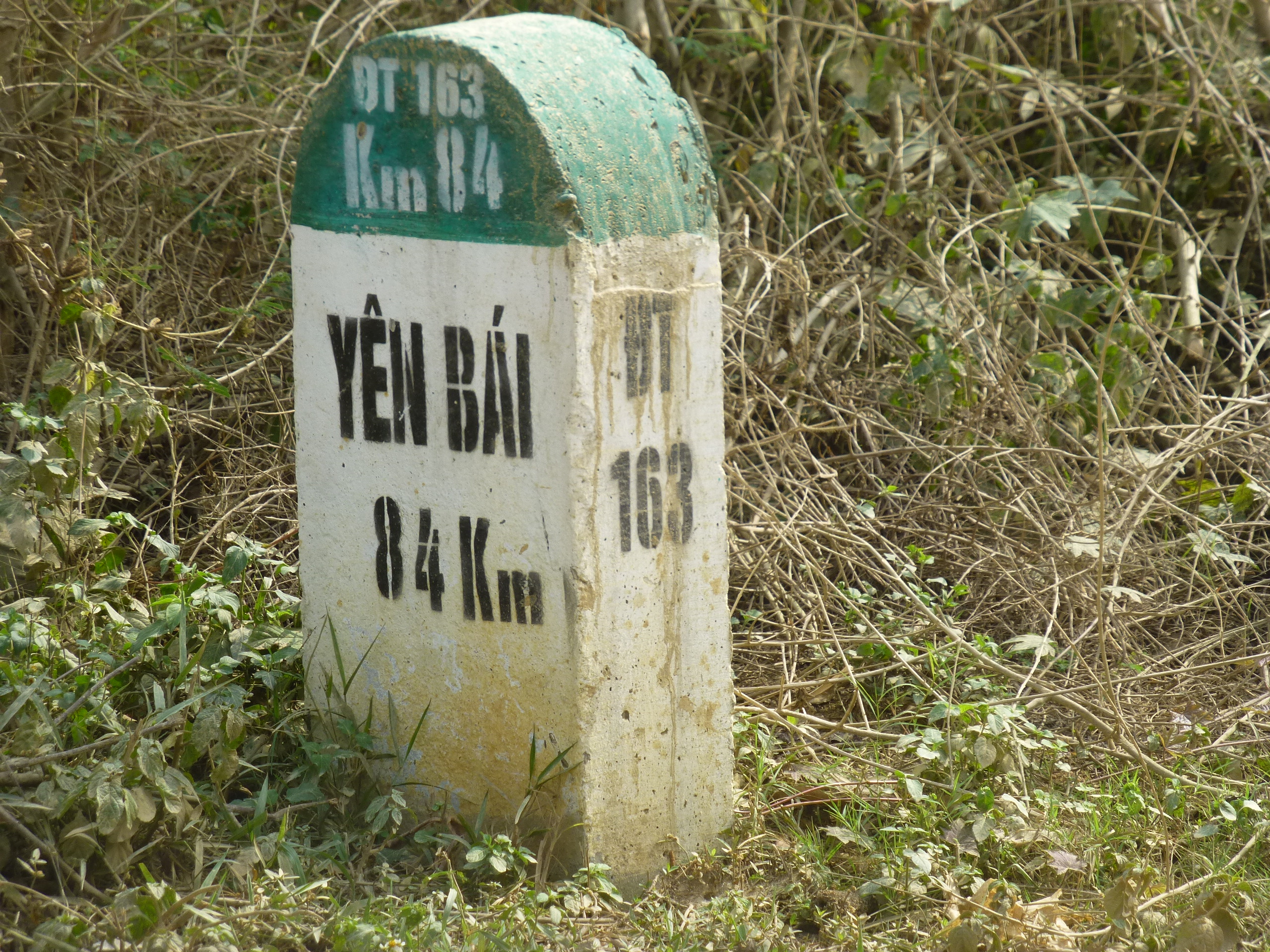
Yên Bái Provincial Road 163 milestone

The total length of the Vietnamese road system is about 570.448 km (2018) (including three main systems: 21,109 km of national highways managed by the central government; 583 km of expressways already in operation, not including expressways under construction that will be put into operation in the near future; and 548,756 km of local roads: 26,953 km of urban roads, 28,911 km of provincial roads, and 492,892 km of rural roads) and over 28,000 bridges of various sizes. The road transport infrastructure assets in Vietnam currently handle approximately 90% of passenger transport and 70% of freight transport within the entire national transport system. The road network is relatively well developed, but in poor condition. Due to congestion and lack of safety, the average speed on the national roads is a mere 50 kilometres per hour (31 mph).

Road financing comes from a number of sources including the government, overseas donors such as the Asian Development Bank, World Bank, JBIC and business organizations. Road investment recovery is mainly through tolls collected on bridges and roads, in accordance with laws mentioned above.

Vietnam's road system is classified according to the administrative hierarchy. Each classification is assigned a milestone color and abbreviation.

- National roads (quốc lộ, abbreviated QL) are administered by the central government. They are marked by white milestones with red tops. On direction signs, they were historically denoted by white on blue markers, but since 2015 are denoted by black on white markers.
  - Expressways or freeways (đường cao tốc, CT) are denoted by black on yellow markers on direction signs. Guide signs along expressways are green, in contrast to the blue guide signs along surface roads.
- Provincial roads (tỉnh lộ or đường tỉnh, TL or ĐT) are managed by provinces. They are marked by white milestones with blue or green tops. On direction signs, they are denoted by black on white markers.
- District roads (hương lộ or đường huyện, HL or ĐH) are managed by rural districts. They are marked by white milestones with brown tops.
- Commune roads (đường xã, ĐX) are managed by communes.
- Urban roads (đường đô thị, ĐĐT) are managed by cities and towns.
- Certain service roads (đường chuyên dùng, ĐCD) may be marked by white milestones with yellow tops.

National roads
- National Route 1: Huu Nghi Quan Border Gate (Lạng Sơn) – Cà Mau province
- National Route 1B: Lạng Sơn – Thái Nguyên
- National Route 1C: Khánh Hòa
- National Route 1D: Gia Lai – Đắk Lắk
- National Route 1K: Đồng Nai – Ho Chi Minh City
- National Route 2: Hanoi – Tuyên Quang (border checkpoint Thanh Thuy)
- National Route 2B: Phú Thọ
- National Route 2C: Hanoi – Tuyên Quang
- National Route 2D: Tuyên Quang – Phú Thọ
- National Route 3: Hanoi – Cao Bằng (border checkpoint Ta Lung)
- National Route 3B: Tuyên Quang – Lạng Sơn
- National Route 3C: Thái Nguyên
- National Route 3E: Lạng Sơn
- National Route 4 (Ring road 1): 4A (Lạng Sơn – Cao Bằng), 4B (Quảng Ninh – Lạng Sơn), 4C (Tuyên Quang - Cao Bằng), 4D (Lào Cai – Lai Châu), 4H (Điện Biên)
- National Route 4E: Lào Cai
- National Route 4G: Sơn La
- National Route 4I: Điện Biên - Lai Châu
- National Route 5: Hanoi – Haiphong
- National Route 5C: Haiphong (Đình Vũ - Lạch Huyện)
- National Route 6: Hanoi – Điện Biên
- National Route 6B: Sơn La (Thuận Châu – Quỳnh Nhai)
- National Route 7: Nghệ An
- National Route 7B: Nghệ An (Diễn Châu – Thanh Chương)
- National Route 8A: Hà Tĩnh (Hồng Lĩnh – Cầu Treo)
- National Route 8B: Hà Tĩnh (Hồng Lĩnh – Nghi Xuân)
- National Route 9: Quảng Trị
- National Route 9A: Quảng Trị (Đông Hà – Lao Bảo)
- National Route 9B: Quảng Trị (Đồng Hới – Lệ Thủy)
- National Route 9C: Quảng Trị (Đông Hà)
- National Route 9D: Quảng Trị (Hiền Lương – Của Việt)
- National Route 9E: Quảng Trị
- National Route 9G: Quảng Trị (Bố Trạch)
- National Route 10: Quảng Ninh – Thanh Hóa
- National Route 12: Lai Châu (border checkpoint Ma Lu Thang) – Điện Biên
- National Route 12A: Quảng Bình
- National Route 12B: Ninh Bình – Hòa Bình
- National Route 12C: Hà Tĩnh – Quảng Trị
- National Route 13: Ho Chi Minh City – Đồng Nai (border checkpoint Hoa Lư)
- National Route 14A: Quảng Trị – Đồng Nai
- National Route 14B: Da Nang
- National Route 14C: Gia Lai – Lâm Đồng
- National Route 14D: Da Nang (Thạnh Mỹ – Đắk Tôi, Nam Giang)
- National Route 14E: Da Nang
- National Route 14G: Da Nang
- National Route 14H: Da Nang (Hội An – Nông Sơn)
- National Route 15: Phú Thọ – Quảng Trị
- National Route 15B: Hà Tĩnh (Can Lộc – Cẩm Xuyên)
- National Route 15C: Thanh Hóa (Bá Thước – Mường Lát)
- National Route 15D: Quảng Trị (Đa Krông)
- National Route 16: Quảng Trị (Đồng Hới – Bố Trạch)
- National Route 17: Hanoi – Thái Nguyên
- National Route 17B: Quảng Ninh – Haiphong
- National Route 18: Hanoi – Quảng Ninh (border checkpoint Mong Cai)
- National Route 18C: Quảng Ninh (Bình Liêu – Tiên Yên)
- National Route 19A: Gia Lai
- National Route 19B: Gia Lai (Nhơn Hội – Phú Phong)
- National Route 19C: Gia Lai – Đắk Lắk
- National Route 20: Đồng Nai – Lâm Đồng
- National Route 21: Hanoi – Ninh Bình
- National Route 21B: Hanoi – Ninh Bình
- National Route 21C: Hanoi – Ninh Bình
- National Route 22A: Ho Chi Minh City – Tây Ninh (border checkpoint Moc Bai)
- National Route 22B: Tây Ninh (Gò Dầu – border checkpoint Xa Mat)
- National Route 23: Hanoi – Phú Thọ
- National Route 24: Quảng Ngãi
- National Route 24B: Quảng Ngãi (Bình Sơn – Ba Tơ)
- National Route 24C: Quảng Ngãi (Bình Sơn – Bắc Trà My)
- National Route 25: Đắk Lắk – Gia Lai
- National Route 26: Khánh Hòa – Đắk Lắk
- National Route 26B: Khánh Hòa
- National Route 27: Đắk Lắk – Khánh Hòa
- National Route 27B: Khánh Hòa
- National Route 27C: Khánh Hòa – Lâm Đồng
- National Route 28: Bình Thuận – Đắk Nông province
- National Route 28B: Bình Thuận – Lâm Đồng
- National Route 29: Đắk Lắk province
- National Route 30: Đồng Tháp
- National Route 31: Lạng Sơn – Bắc Ninh
- National Route 32: Hanoi – Lai Châu
- National Route 32B: Phú Thọ – Sơn La
- National Route 32C: Phú Thọ – Lào Cai
- National Route 34: Cao Bằng – Tuyên Quang
- National Route 34B: Cao Bằng
- National Route 35: Ninh Bình
- National Route 36: Nghệ An – Thanh Hóa
- National Route 37: Hưng Yên – Sơn La
- National Route 37B: Hưng Yên – Ninh Bình
- National Route 37C: Nam Định province – Phú Thọ
- National Route 38: Bắc Ninh – Ninh Bình
- National Route 38B: Haiphong – Ninh Bình
- National Route 39: Hưng Yên province
- National Route 39B: Hưng Yên – Ninh Binh
- National Route 40: Quảng Ngãi
- National Route 40B: Da Nang – Quảng Ngãi
- National Route 43: Sơn La
- National Route 45: Ninh Bình – Thanh Hóa
- National Route 46: Nghệ An
- National Route 46B: Nghệ An
- National Route 46C: Nghệ An
- National Route 47: Thanh Hóa
- National Route 47B: Thanh Hóa
- National Route 47C: Thanh Hóa
- National Route 48: Nghệ An
- National Route 48B: Nghệ An (Quỳnh Lưu)
- National Route 48C: Nghệ An (Tương Dương)
- National Route 48D: Nghệ An
- National Route 48E: Nghệ An
- National Route 49: Huế
- National Route 49B: Quảng Trị – Huế
- National Route 49C: Quảng Trị
- National Route 50: Ho Chi Minh City – Đồng Tháp
- National Route 51: Đồng Nai – Ho Chi Minh City
- National Route 52: Ho Chi Minh City – Đồng Nai
- National Route 53: Vĩnh Long
- National Route 54: Đồng Tháp – Vĩnh Long
- National Route 55: Ho Chi Minh City – Lâm Đồng
- National Route 55B: Lâm Đồng (Tánh Linh – Hàm Tân)
- National Route 56: Ho Chi Minh City – Đồng Nai
- National Route 56B: Đồng Nai – Tây Ninh
- National Route 57: Vĩnh Long
- National Route 57B: Vĩnh Long
- National Route 57C: Vĩnh Long
- National Route 60: Đồng Tháp – Cần Thơ
- National Route 61: Cần Thơ – An Giang
- National Route 61B: Cần Thơ
- National Route 61C: Cần Thơ
- National Route 62: Tây Ninh
- National Route 63: An Giang – Cà Mau
- National Route 70: Phú Thọ – Lào Cai
- National Route 70B: Phú Thọ
- National Route 71: Hà Tĩnh
- National Route 80: Vĩnh Long – An Giang
- National Route 80B: Đồng Tháp - An Giang
- National Route 91: Cần Thơ – An Giang
- National Route 91B: Cần Thơ – Cà Mau
- National Route 91C: An Giang
- National Route 100: Lai Châu
- National Route 217: Thanh Hóa
- National Route 217B: Thanh Hóa
- National Route 279: Quảng Ninh – Điện Biên (border checkpoint Tay Trang)
- National Route 279D: Lai Châu – Sơn La
- National Route 280: Tuyên Quang
- National Route 281: Hà Tĩnh
- National Route N1: Long An – Kiên Giang
- National Route N2: Bình Dương – Kiên Giang
- Ho Chi Minh Highway: Cao Bằng – Cà Mau
- Quan Lo – Phung Hiep Highway: Hậu Giang – Cà Mau

=== Expressways ===
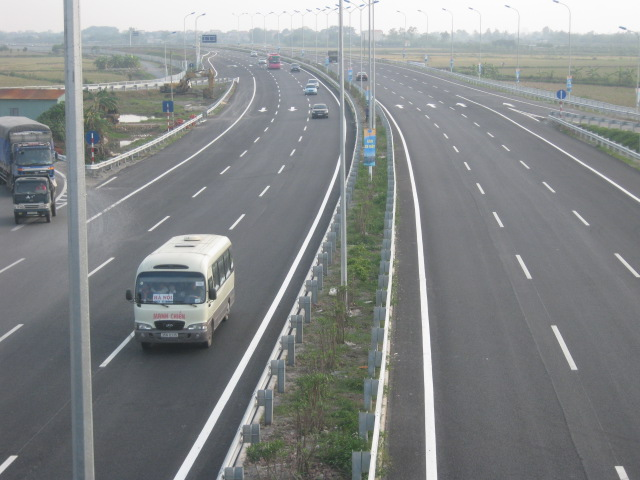
North–South Expressway near Ninh Bình

Expressways are a rather new concept for Vietnam. Traffic is growing rapidly but the major roads are dangerous due to inappropriate design and an inappropriate traffic mix. Expressways would solve these problems along the key corridors, by separating high speed traffic from slower, local traffic.

Vietnam currently recognizes two classes of expressway. Both have a minimum of two lanes in each direction, but Class A has grade separated interchanges, while Class B has at-grade intersections. There are 4 design-speed categories: 60, 80, 100 and 120 km/h. Generally all cars, buses and trucks are permitted on the expressway but công nông (agricultural vehicles) and all types of motorcycles are not.

=== Road vehicles ===
Motorbikes

Vietnam is renowned for its motorbike culture. In 1995, over 90% of trips in both Hanoi and Saigon were done by motorcycle. In 2017, 79% of Vietnamese reported using a motorbike regularly. With 45 million registered motorbikes on a 92 million population headcount, Vietnam has one of the highest motorbike ownership rates worldwide. Vietnam is the 4th largest market for motorbike sales, after China, India and Indonesia. 87% of Vietnamese households own a motorbike, a number only surpassed by Thailand.

One of the reasons for the extensive use of motorbikes is lack of investment in public transportation. In recent years, the government has expressed the desire to reduce the number of motorbikes in an effort to curb congestion.

Cars

As of 2015, 2 million passenger cars were registered.

Car prices are kept high by import taxes and sales tax, which put Vietnam as one of the most expensive countries to buy a car, with up to 2 or 3 times the final price consisting of taxes and fees. In 2016, a Lexus LX was priced at 7.3 billion VND (US$315,000), a Toyota Innova at 800 million VND (US$35,000), Despite this, car sales are growing at double digit rates each year.

== Water transport ==
=== Ferries ===
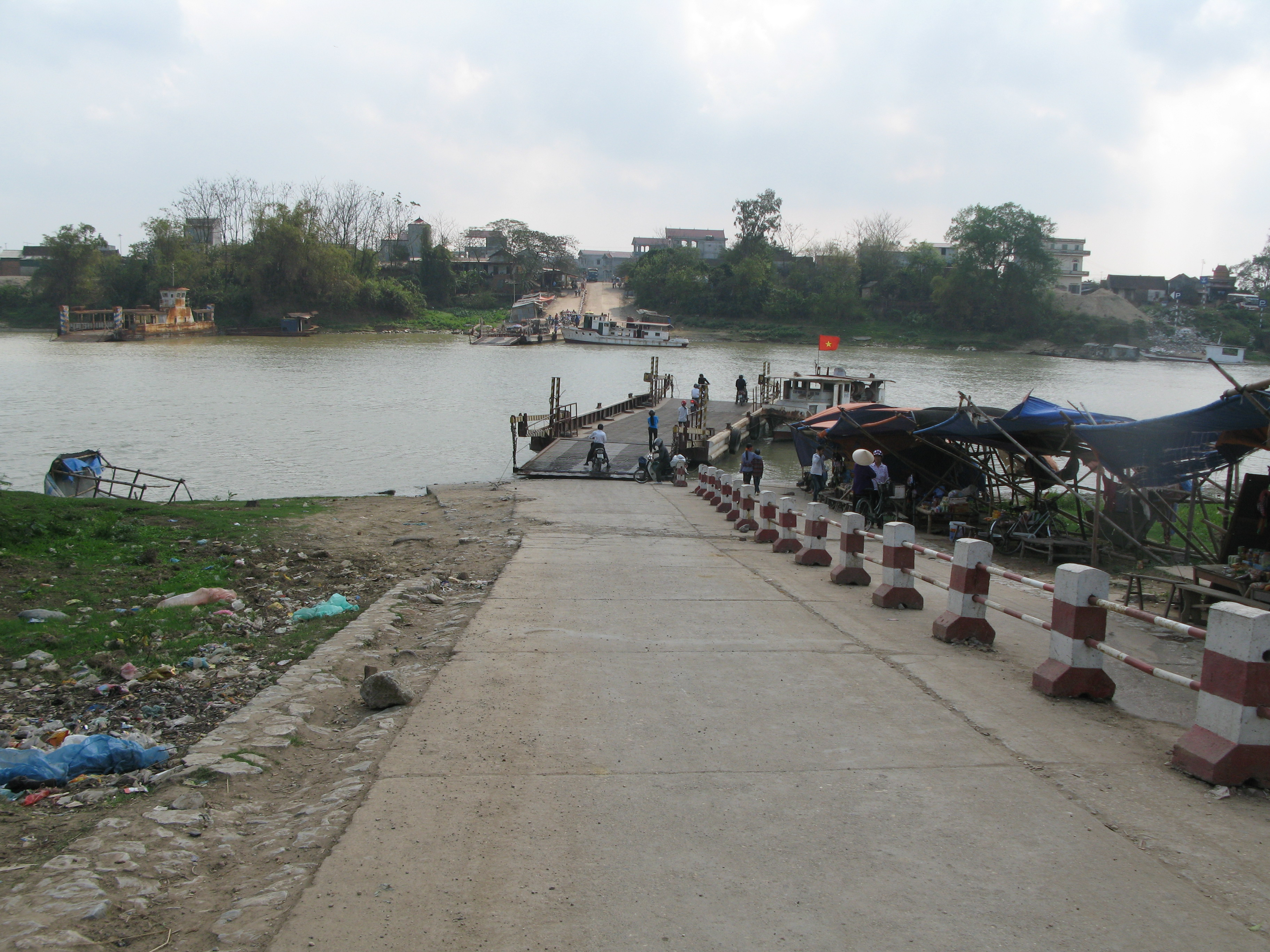
Ferry over the Cầu River

Most river crossings have long been replaced by bridges, however ferry crossings still operate for vehicles not allowed on expressways.

- Cát Lái ferry, between Ho Chi Minh City and former Nhơn Trạch district, crossing the Đồng Nai River.
- Between Ho Chi Minh City and Vũng Tàu, a high-speed passenger ferry service is available.

=== Ports and harbors ===
- Cam Ranh – large deep water port used by Marco Polo during his voyages to China; formerly a major military facility for the U.S. Army and US Navy during the 1960s; later used by the Soviet Navy and the Vietnamese Navy
- Da Nang – Tien Sa seaport is the third largest sea port in Vietnam after Ho Chi Minh City and Hai Phong; handles 3-4 million tons of cargo annually
- Hai Phong
- Ho Chi Minh City – Saigon Port
- Hong Gai
- Qui Nhơn
- Nha Trang
- Nghi Son (Thanh Hóa)
- Son Duong (Hà Tĩnh)
- Dung Quất (Quảng Ngãi)
- Vũng Tàu – Vũng Tàu Port

Vietnam has 17,702 km of waterways; 5,000 km of which are navigable by vessels up to 1.8 m draft.

=== Merchant marine ===
- Total: 579 ships (1,000 GT or over)
- Ships by type: barge 1, bulk 142, cargo 335, chemical tanker 23, container 19, liquified gas 7, passenger/cargo 1, petroleum tanker 48, refrigerated cargo 1, roll on/roll off 1, specialized tanker 1
- Registered in other countries: 86 (Cambodia 1, Kiribati 2, Mongolia 33, Panama 43, Taiwan 1, Tuvalu 6) (2010)

== Air transport ==
Air travel is rapidly growing in importance. The route between Hanoi and Ho Chi Minh City has been world's 7th busiest airline route by seat capacity since 2016.

=== Airports ===
Vietnam operates 37 civilian airports, including three international gateways: Noi Bai serving Hanoi, Da Nang serving Da Nang City, and Tan Son Nhat serving Ho Chi Minh City. Tan Son Nhat is the largest, handling 75 percent of international passenger traffic. A new airport is currently being built, Long Thanh International Airport, also serving Ho Chi Minh City. Vietnam Airlines, the national airline, has a fleet of 82 aircraft that link Vietnam with 49 foreign cities. The second largest domestic carrier is VietJet Air, serving 16 domestic destinations and 31 international destinations, and the third largest is Bamboo Airways (with eight and six destinations respectively).

Airports with civil service

- Total : 37
- Airports with runways over 3,047 m : 9
- Airports with runways from 2,438 to 3,047 m :6
- Airports with runways from 1,524 to 2,437 m :13
- Airports with runways from 914 to 1,523 m :9

Heliports

- Total: 1

== Railways ==
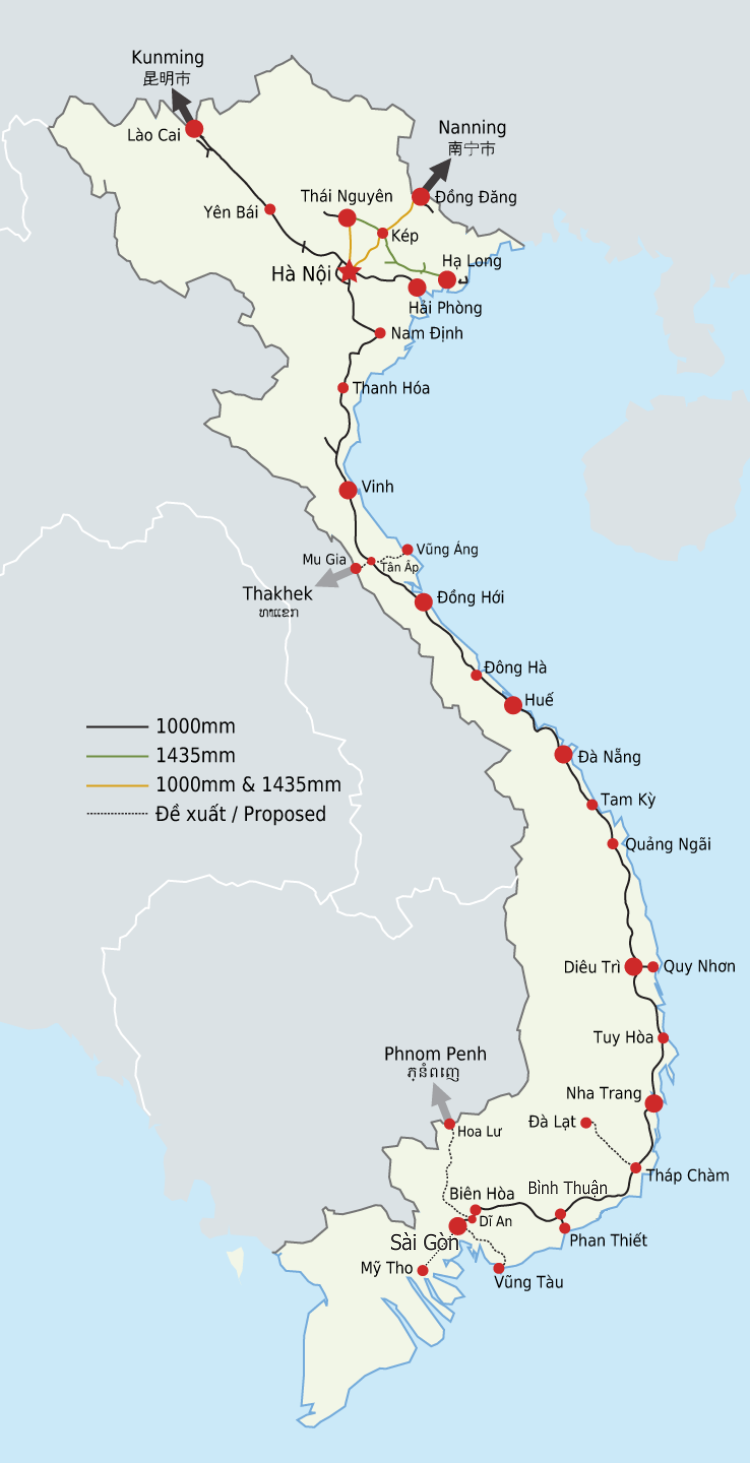
The Vietnamese railway network.

The Vietnamese railway network has a total length of 2,600 kilometres (1,600 mi), dominated by the 1,726 kilometres (1,072 mi) single track North–South Railway running between Hanoi and Ho Chi Minh City. The national railway network uses mainly 1,000 mm (3 ft 3 3/8 in) metre gauge, although there are several 1,435 mm (4 ft 8 1/2 in) standard gauge and mixed gauge lines in the North of the country. There were 278 stations on the Vietnamese railway network as of 2005, most of which are located along the North–South line. The Vietnamese railway network is owned and operated by the state-owned enterprise Vietnam Railways (VNR), which operates a number of different subsidiaries involved in construction, communications, training, and other activities connected to railway maintenance.

The overall condition of railway infrastructure in Vietnam varies from poor to fair; most of the network remains in need of rehabilitation and upgrading, having received only temporary repair from damages suffered during decades of war. A joint Japanese-Vietnamese evaluation team found that the poor state of railway infrastructure was the fundamental cause for most railway crashes and derailments, of which the most common types are train collisions involving vehicles and pedestrians, especially at illegal level crossings; derailments caused by failure to decrease speed was also noted as a common cause of collisions.

=== International railway links ===
People's Republic of China

Two railways connect Vietnam to the People's Republic of China: the western Yunnan–Vietnam Railway, from Haiphong to Kunming, and the eastern railway from Hanoi to Nanning. The railway into Yunnan is a metre-gauge line, the only such line to operate inside China; it may, however, be converted to standard gauge. Railway service along the Chinese portion of the route is currently suspended. Cross-border service was available until 2002, when floods and landslides, which frequently caused delays along the route, caused serious damage to the tracks on the Chinese side. Hanoi–Đồng Đăng Railway access to Nanning is done through the border at Đồng Đăng, in Lạng Sơn province. Regular service generally entails stopping at the border, changing from a Vietnamese metre-gauge train to a Chinese standard-gauge train, and continuing on to Nanning.

The Yunnan–Vietnam Railway will form the Chinese part of the Singapore–Kunming Rail Link, which is expected to be completed in 2015.

Cambodia and Laos

There are currently no railway connections between Vietnam and Cambodia or Laos. As part of plans established by ASEAN, however, two new railways are under development: Saigon–Lộc Ninh Railway connecting Ho Chi Minh City to Phnom Penh, Cambodia, and one connecting the North–South Railway to Thakhek in Laos. The Vietnamese portion of the Phnom Penh railway would begin with a junction of the North–South Railway at Dĩ An railway station, and would end in Lộc Ninh, Bình Phước province, close to the Cambodian border, linking up with a similar project on the Cambodian side. According to the plan established by ASEAN, this stretch is scheduled for completion by 2020; it will form part of the Kunming–Singapore railway project, overseen by the ASEAN–Mekong Basin Development Cooperation (AMBDC). Vientiane – Vũng Áng Railway would run between Vung Ang, a port in Hà Tĩnh province, to connect with the North–South Railway at Tân Ấp railway station in Quảng Bình province, then crossing through the Mụ Giạ Pass towards Thakhek. According to plans established by ASEAN, the line may then be extended via Thakhek all the way to the Laotian capital Vientiane. Both Laos and Thailand have expressed interest in the project as a shorter export gateway to the Pacific Ocean.

=== High-speed rail ===
North–South Express Railway

National railway company Vietnam Railways has proposed a high-speed rail link between Hanoi and Ho Chi Minh City, capable of running at speeds of 300 km/h (186 mph). Once completed, the high-speed rail line—using Japanese Shinkansen technology—would allow trains to complete the Hanoi–Ho Chi Minh City journey in less than six hours, compared to around 30 hours taken on the existing railway. Vietnamese prime minister Nguyễn Tấn Dũng had originally set an ambitious target, approving a 1,630 km (1,010 mi) line to be completed by 2013, with 70 percent of funding (initially estimated at US$33 billion) coming from Japanese ODA, and the remaining 30 percent raised through loans. Later reports raised estimated costs to US$56 billion (almost 60 percent of Vietnam's GDP in 2009) for a completion date in the mid-2030s. On June 19, 2010, after a month of deliberation, Vietnam's National Assembly rejected the high speed rail proposal due to its high cost; National Assembly deputies had asked for further study of the project.

In 2018 a new feasibility study was submitted and based on that the government wants to reconsider the cost-benefit of the project. Plans show the first phase of construction to build sections between Hanoi and Vinh, and simultaneously between Ho Chi Minh City and Nha Trang both to be finished by 2032 with the entire north–south link to be finished by 2045.

Ho Chi Minh City–Cần Thơ Express Railway

Another high-speed rail has been proposed to connect Ho Chi Minh City to Southeast Vietnam and Cần Thơ.

=== Metro ===
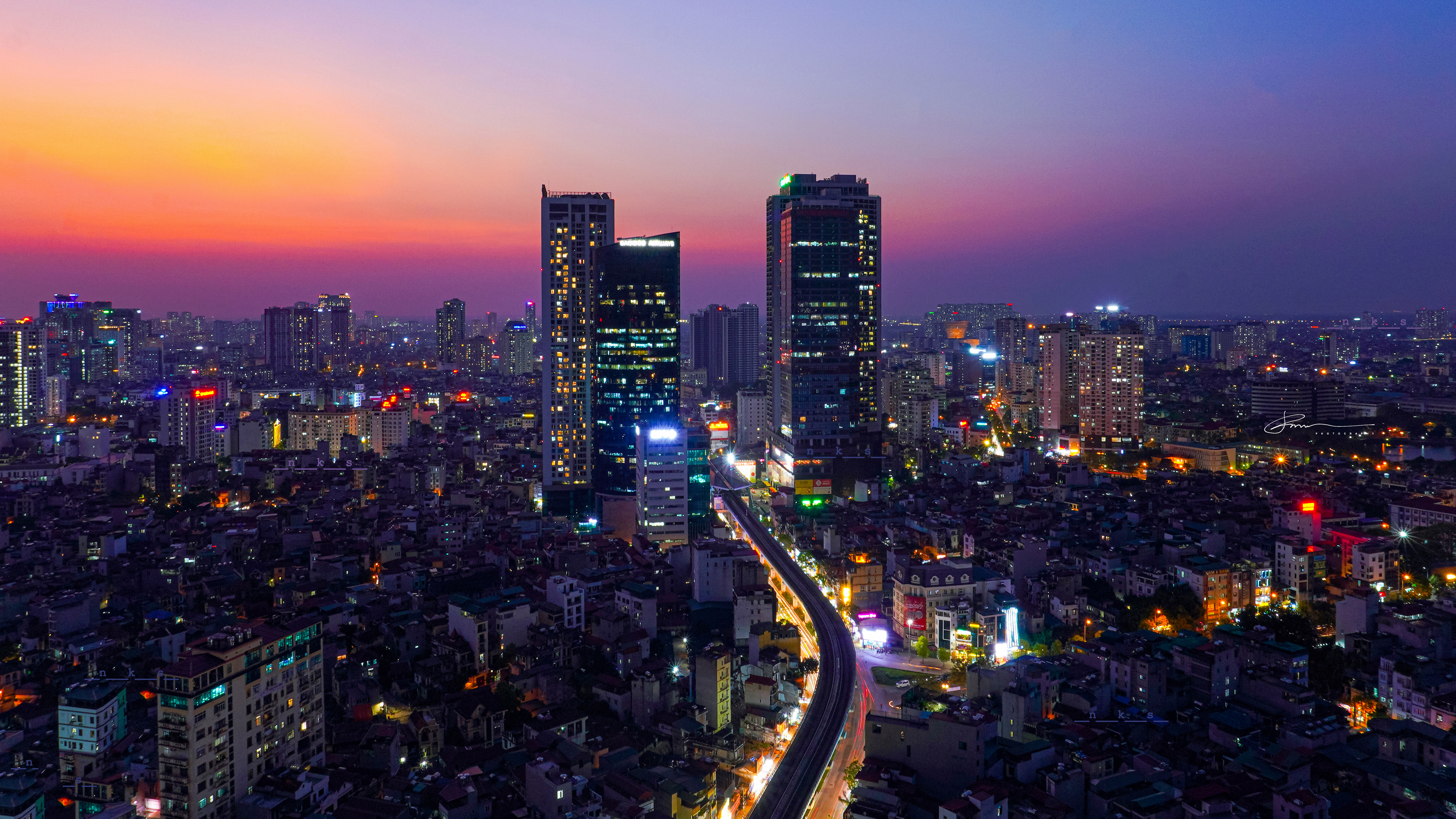
A view of Hanoi Metro Line 3, which will eventually be extended underground

The two biggest cities in Vietnam have operating metro systems. After years of delays, the Hanoi Metro system began operations on November 6, 2021, with Line 2A. This was followed by the partial opening of Line 3 on August 8, 2024. On December 22, 2024, Line 1 of the Ho Chi Minh City Metro opened to service, which also saw the opening of the country's first underground stations.

== Pipelines ==
In April 1995, a 125-kilometer natural gas pipeline connecting Bach Ho with a power plant near Vũng Tàu went into operation. With the subsequent addition of compressors, the volume pumped rose to more than 1 billion cubic meters per year. In 2005 a 399-kilometer underwater pipeline, the world's longest, began to carry natural gas onshore from the Nam Côn Sơn basin. The pipeline's anticipated capacity is 2 billion cubic meters per year, while the basin has an estimated 59 billion cubic meters of natural gas reserves. Vietnam has 28 km of condensate pipeline, 10 km of condensate/gas pipeline, 216 of natural gas line, and 206 km of pipeline for refined products.

== See also ==
- North–South Express Railway (Vietnam)
- North–South Expressway East
- North–South Expressway West
- Motorcycle industry in Vietnam
