= List of busiest container ports =

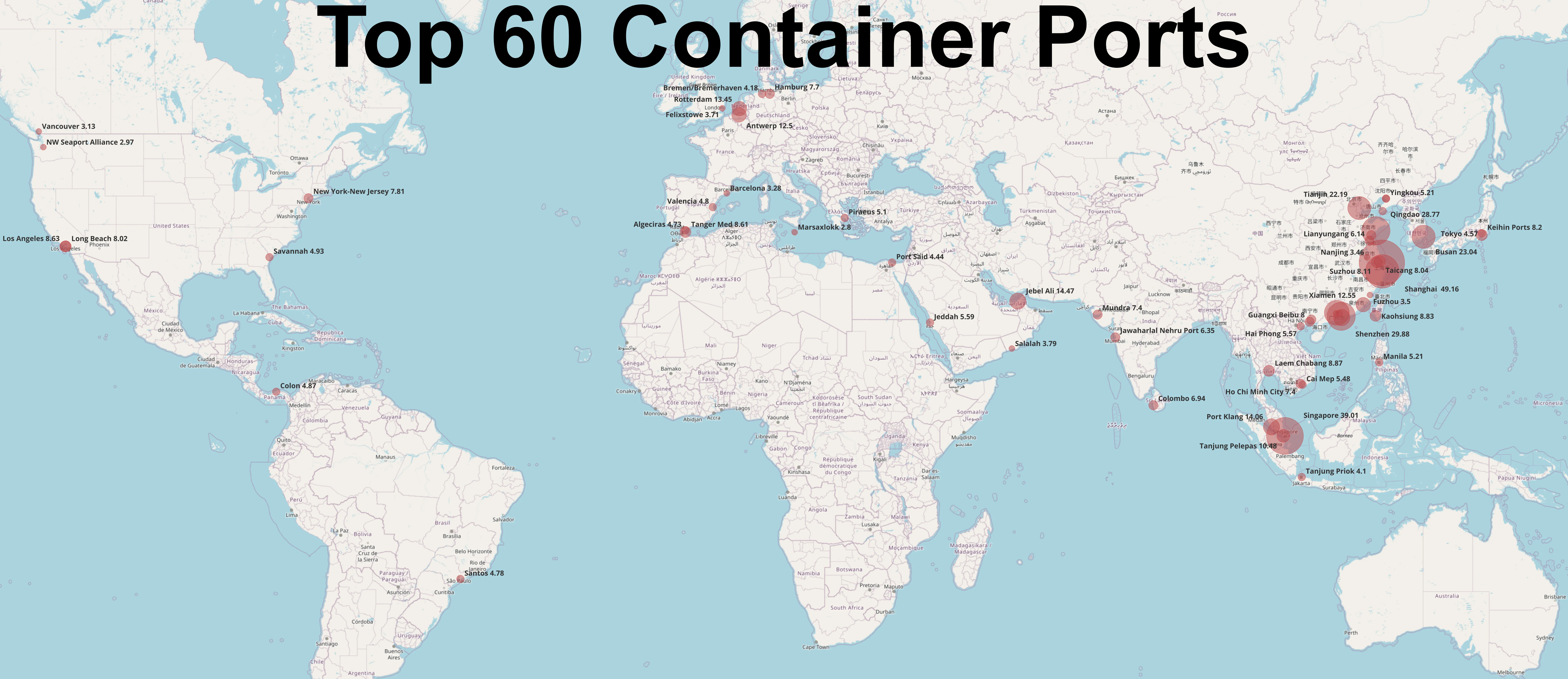
Top 60 container ports

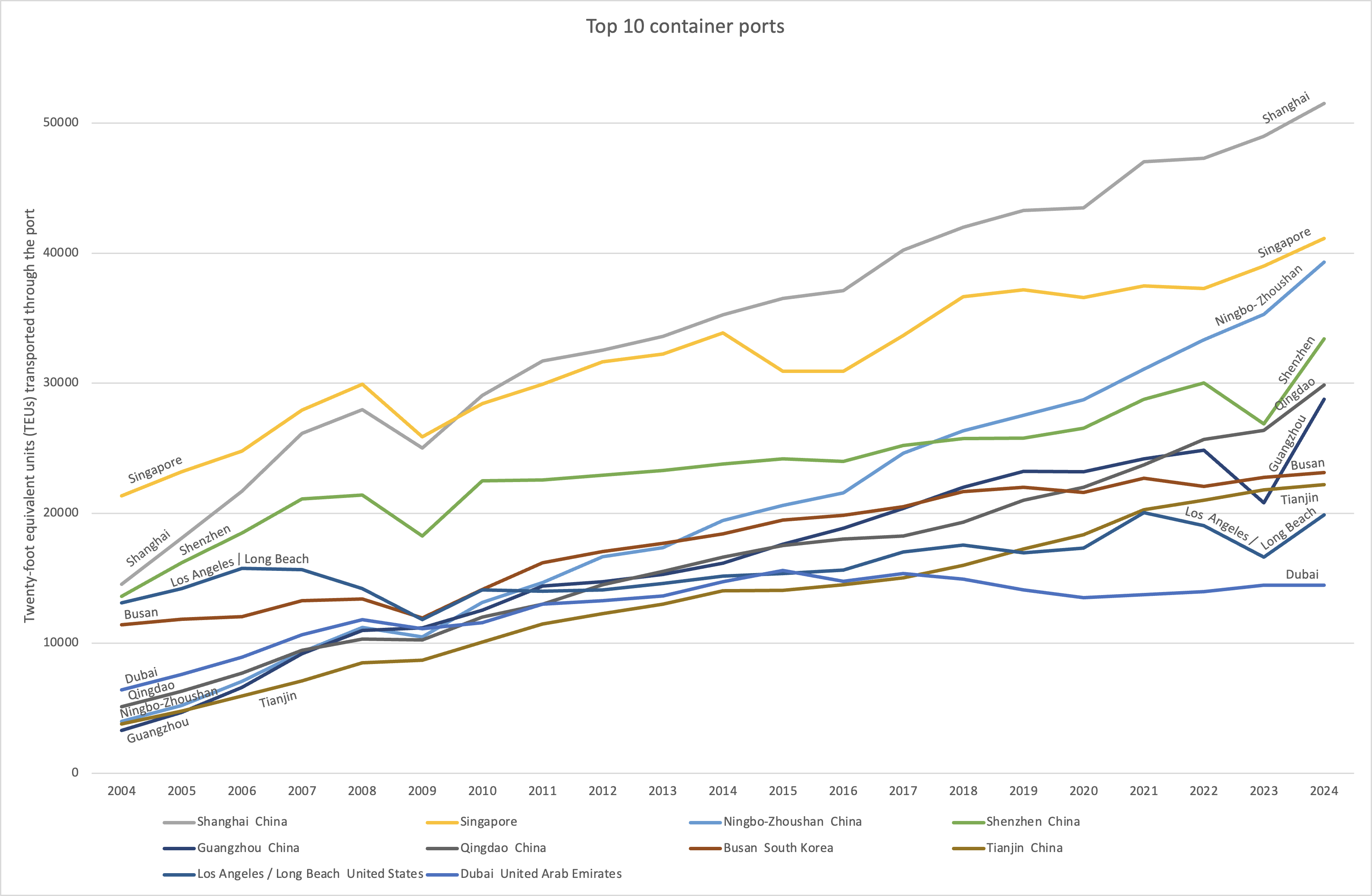
The top 10 busiest container ports by year (2004–2024)

This article lists the world's busiest container ports (ports with container terminals that specialize in handling goods transported in intermodal shipping containers), by total number of twenty-foot equivalent units (TEUs) transported through the port. The table lists volume in thousands of TEU per year. The vast majority of containers moved by large, ocean-faring container ships are 20-foot (1 TEU) and 40-foot (2 TEU) ISO-standard shipping containers, with 40-foot units outnumbering 20-foot units to such an extent that the actual number of containers moved is between 55%–60% of the number of TEUs counted.

The latest ranking reflected the figures for the year 2023, as published in the Lloyds List Top 100 and World Shipping Council (2024 figures)

== World's busiest container port - Top 10 ==
Container traffic (in thousand TEUs, based on Lloyds List Top 100 and World Shipping Council (2024 figures)
#	Port	Country	Region	Location	2025	2023	2022	2021	2020	2019	2018	2017	2016	2015	2014	2013	2012	2011	2010	2009	2008	2007	2006	2005	2004	
1	Shanghai	China	East Asia	Yangtze Delta	55,062	49,000*	47,303	47,030	43,500	43,303	42,010	40,233	37,133	36,537	35,268	33,617	32,529	31,700	29,069	25,002	27,980	26,150	21,710	18,084	14,557	
2	Singapore	Singapore	Southeast Asia	Singapore Strait	44,660	39,010^	37,289	37,470	36,600	37,195	36,599	33,666	30,904	30,922	33,869	32,240	31,649	29,937	28,431	25,866	29,918	27,932	24,792	23,192	21,329	
3	Ningbo-Zhoushan	China	East Asia	Yangtze Delta	43,872	35,300**	33,351	31,070	28,720	27,530	26,351	24,607	21,560	20,620	19,450	17,351	16,670	14,686	13,144	10,502	11,226	9,349	7,068	5,208	4,006	
4	Shenzhen	China	East Asia	Pearl River Delta	35,408	26,890	30,036	28,768	26,550	25,770	25,740	25,208	23,979	24,204	23,798	23,280	22,940	22,570	22,510	18,250	21,414	21,099	18,469	16,197	13,615	
5	Qingdao	China	East Asia	Yellow Sea	32,893	26,390	25,670	23,710	22,000	21,010	19,315	18,262	18,010	17,510	16,624	15,520	14,503	13,020	12,012	10,260	10,320	9,462	7,702	6,307	5,140	
6	Guangzhou	China	East Asia	Pearl River Delta	28,050	20,800	24,857	24,180	23,190	23,236	21,992	20,370	18,858	17,625	16,160	15,309	14,744	14,400	12,550	11,190	11,001	9,200	6,600	4,685	3,308	
7	Busan	South Korea	East Asia	Korean Strait	24,881	22,750	22,078	22,706	21,590	21,992	21,662	20,493	19,850	19,469	18,423	17,690	17,046	16,185	14,157	11,954	13,425	13,270	12,039	11,843	11,430	
8	Tianjin	China	East Asia	Yellow Sea	24,032	21,800	21,021	20,269	18,350	17,264	15,972	15,040	14,490	14,090	14,050	13,010	12,300	11,500	10,080	8,700	8,500	7,103	5,950	4,801	3,814	
9	Jebel Ali Dubai	United Arab Emirates	West Asia	Persian Gulf	15,552	14,472	13,970	13,742	13,488	14,111	14,954	15,368	14,772	15,592	14,750	13,641	13,270	13,000	11,600	11,124	11,827	10,653	8,923	7,619	6,429	
10	Port Klang	Malaysia	Southeast Asia	Malacca Strait	15,138	14,061	13,220	13,724	13,240	13,580	12,316	11,978	13,170	11,887	10,736	10,350	10,000	9,604	8,870	7,309	7,970	7,120	6,326	5,544	5,244	
* Shanghai crossed the 50 millionth TEUs mark in December 22, 2024.																										
^ Singapore posted 41.12million TEUs by end-December 2024.																										
** Ningbo-Zhoushen reported 39.3 million TEUs for end-December 2024. == World's busiest container port : 11-52 ==
11	Ports of Johor	Malaysia	Southeast Asia	Malacca Strait	15,110	10,480	10,512	11,200	9,850	9,100	8,960	8,261	8,281		9,120	8,500	7,628	7,700	7,500	6,530	6,000	5,600	5,500	4,770	4,177	4,020
12	Rotterdam	Netherlands	Europe	Rhine delta	14,245	13,400	14,455	15,300	14,350	14,810	14,512	13,734	12,385	12,235	12,453	11,621	11,866	11,877	11,146	9,743	10,784	10,791	9,655	9,287	8,281	
13	Antwerp	Belgium	Europe	Scheldt delta	13,630	12,528	13,500	12,020	12,031	11,860	11,100	10,451	10,037	9,654	9,136	8,578	8,635	8,664	8,468	7,309	8,663	8,176	7,019	6,482	6,064	
14	Hong Kong	China	East Asia	Pearl River Delta	12,995	14,300	16,685	17,798	20,070	18,361	19,596	20,770	19,813	20,073	22,374	22,352	23,117	24,384	23,532	20,983	24,248	23,881	23,539	22,427	21,984	
15	Xiamen	China	East Asia	Taiwan Strait	12,507	12,550	12,434	12,045	11,410	11,122	10,702	10,380	9,614	9,183	8,572	8,010	7,202	6,461	5,820	4,680	5,035	4,627	4,019	3,342	2,872	
16	Tanger-Med	Morocco	North Africa	Western Mediterranean	11,106	8,617	7,596	7,173	5,771	4,801	3,472	3,312	2,960													
17	Laem Chabang	Thailand	Southeast Asia	Gulf of Thailand	10,542	8,680	8,741	8,335	7,547	8,106	8,070	7,670	7,227	6,780	6,518	6,032	5,830	5,731	5,068	4,538	5,134	4,642	4,123	3,834	3,529	
18	Los Angeles	United States	North America	West Coast	10,239	8,634	19,044	20,061	17,327	16,969	17,549	17,013	15,632	15,352	15,161	14,600	14,124	14,002	14,095	11,815	14,200	15,671	15,759	14,195	13,101	
19	Taicang / Suzhou	China	East Asia	Yangtze Delta		8,039	8,025	7,038	5,212	5,152	5,071	4,514	4,081	3,760												
21	Long Beach	United States	North America	Los Angeles		8,018																				
22	Ho Chi Minh Saigon	Vietnam	Southeast Asia	South China Sea		7,397	7,905	7,956	7,854	7,220	6,586	6,156	5,987		5,788	6,334	5,542	5,060	4,674	4,100	3,563	3,100	2,532	2,532	2,122	1,868
23	New York / New Jersey	United States	North America	East Coast		7810	9,493	8,985	7,586	7,471	7,179	6,711	6,252	6,372	5,772	5,467	5,530	5,503	5,292	4,561	5,265	5,299	5,093	4,785	4,478	
24	Kaohsiung	Taiwan	East Asia	Taiwan Strait		8,834	9,491	9,864	9,622	10,428	10,445	10,271	10,465	10,264	10,593	9,938	9,781	9,636	8,872	8,581	9,677	10,257	9,775	9,471	9,714	
25	Mundra	India	South Asia	Gulf of Kutch		7,400	6,503	6,660	6,503	5,657	4,732	4,449	4,240	3,320	2,895											
26	Tanjung Priok	Indonesia	Southeast Asia	Java Sea		7,290	6,849	6,134	7,600	7,640	6,090	5,515		5,201	5,034	6,590	6,200	5,618	4,715	3,800	3,984	3,900	3,280	3,282	3,170	
27	Hamburg	Germany	Europe	Elbe River		7,700	8,261	8,715	8,540	9,274	8,730	8,860	8,910	8,821	9,729	9,302	8,864	9,022	7,900	7,007	9,737	9,890	8,862	8,088	7,003	
27	Colombo	Sri Lanka	South Asia	Laccadive Sea		6,940	6,860	7,250	6,855	7,228	7,047	6,209	5,735		5,185	4,910										2,221
28	Nhava Sheva / Jawaharlal Nehru Mumbai	India	South Asia	Arabian Sea		6,354	5,959	5,630	4,470	5,100	5,051	4,833	4,432	4,490	4,450											
29	Rizhao	China	East Asia	Yellow Sea		6,260	5,804	5,174	4,860	4,500	4,000	3,240	3,010	2,810												
30	Qinzhou	China	East Asia	Gulf of Tonkin		6,210	5,407	4,630	3,950	2,580	2,400	2,303	2,091													
31	Lianyungang	China	East Asia	Yellow Sea		6,140	5,570	5,090	4,800	4,780	4,750	4,711	4,703	4,703												
32	Jeddah	Saudi Arabia	West Asia	Red Sea		5,586	4,960	4,882	4,737	4,433	4,120	4,150	3,957	4,188		4,200	4,561	4,738	4,010	3,830	3,091	3,326	3,068	2,964	2,836	2,426
33	Hai Phong	Vietnam	Southeast Asia	Hong River Delta		5,567.9	5,629	5,696	5,142	5,133	4,954															
34	Cai Mep, Vũng Tàu	Vietnam	Southeast Asia	South China Sea		5,482	5,593	5,385	4,411	3,742	3,567	3,065	2,261													
35	Yingkou	China	East Asia	Liaodong Bay		5,331	4,995	5,207	5,650	5,480	6,487	6,278	6,086		5,922	5,770										
36	Manila	Philippines	Southeast Asia	Manila Bay		5,209.4	5,474	4,976	4,443	5,315	5,085	4,782	4,523	3,976	3,673	3,770	3,705	3,250	3,257	2,815	2,977	2,800	2,638	2,625		
37	Piraeus	Greece	Europe	Eastern Mediterranean		5,100	5,000	5,311	5,437	5,648	4,907	4,145	3,737	3,330	3,164	2,745	1,680	1,198	665	434	1,373	N/A	N/A	N/A		
38	Dalian	China	East Asia	Yellow Sea		5,028	4,459	3,672	5,110	10,210	9,770	9,707	9,614		9,450	10,128	10,860	8,060	6,400	5,242	4,552	4,503	4,574	3,212	2,665	2,211
39	Savannah	United States	North America	East Coast		4,927	5,892	5,613	4,682	4,599	4,350	4,046	3,645	3,737	3,346	3,034	2,966	2,945	2,825	2,356	2,616	2,604	2,160	1,902	1,662	
40	Abu Dhabi	United Arab Emirates	West Asia	Persian Gulf		4,910	4,330	3,440	3,220	2,780	1,740	1,400														
41	Colón	Panama	Central America	Caribbean coast		4,868	5,102	4,916	4,454	4,379	3,890	3,891	3,258	3,577	3,356	2,060	1,900	1,600	2,802	1,856	2,262	N/A	1,947	2,150		
42	Valencia	Spain	Europe	Western Mediterranean		4.804	5,052	5,604	5,428	5,439	5,128	4,832	4,722	4,616	4,442	4,328	4,470	4,327	4,207	3,653	3,593	3,043	2,612	2,410	2,145	
43	Santos	Brazil	South America	South Atlantic Ocean		4,783	4,986	4,831	4,232	4,165	4,120	3,854	3,394	3,645	3,685	3,446	3,172	2,985	2,716	2,252	2,675	2,533	2,208	2,240	1,883	
44	Algeciras	Spain	Europe	Western Mediterranean		4,733	4,767	4,799	5,108	5,125	4,773	4,340	4,761	4,516	4,457	4,501	4,114	3,603	2,810	3,042	3,324	3,152	3,257	3,180	2,937	
45	Yantai	China	East Asia	Yellow Sea		4,627	4,117	3,651	3,300	3,102	3,001															
46	Tokyo	Japan	East Asia	Tokyo Bay		4,570	4,430	4,326	4,260	4,510	4,570	4,500	4,700	4,629	4,917	4,861	4,752	4,640	4,286	3,810	4,271	3,818	3,969	3,593	3,358	
47	Port Said	Egypt	North Africa	North of Suez Canal		4,438	4,252	4,765	4,010	3,816	3,105	2,968	3,036	3,462	3,036	4,100	3,631	4,272	3,646	3,300	3,202	2,127	2,127	1,522	869	
48	Bremerhaven	Germany	Europe	North Sea		4,181	4,572	5,018	4,767	4,856	5,450	5,510	5,535		5,479	5,796	5,831	6,115	5,915	4,871	4,578	5,529	4,912	4,450	3,736	3,469
49	Tanjung Perak	Indonesia	Southeast Asia	Madura Strait		4,100	3,972	3,901	3,602																	
50	Dongguan	China	East Asia	Pearl River Delta		3,901	-																			
51	Houston	United States	North America	Gulf of Mexico		3,824	3,974	3,453	3,001	2,987	2,701															
52	Salalah	Oman	West Asia	Arabian Sea		3,790	4,504	4,510	4,340	4,109	3,390	3,946	3,325	2,569										2,229		

== See also ==
- United States container ports
- List of largest container shipping companies
- List of largest container ships
- List of busiest ports in Europe
- List of countries by container port traffic

== World's busiest container port ==
Container traffic (in thousand TEUs)
#	Port	Country	Region	Location	2024	2023	2022	2021	2020	2019	2018	2017	2016	2015	2014	2013	2012	2011	2010	2009	2008	2007	2006	2005	2004
1	Shanghai	China	East Asia	Yangtze Delta	51,506	49,000	47,303	47,030	43,500	43,303	42,010	40,233	37,133	36,537	35,268	33,617	32,529	31,700	29,069	25,002	27,980	26,150	21,710	18,084	14,557
2	Singapore	Singapore	Southeast Asia	Singapore Strait	41,124	39,010	37,289	37,470	36,600	37,195	36,599	33,666	30,904	30,922	33,869	32,240	31,649	29,937	28,431	25,866	29,918	27,932	24,792	23,192	21,329
3	Ningbo-Zhoushan	China	East Asia	Yangtze Delta	39,308	35,300	33,351	31,070	28,720	27,530	26,351	24,607	21,560	20,620	19,450	17,351	16,670	14,686	13,144	10,502	11,226	9,349	7,068	5,208	4,006
4	Shenzhen	China	East Asia	Pearl River Delta	33,380	26,890	30,036	28,768	26,550	25,770	25,740	25,208	23,979	24,204	23,798	23,280	22,940	22,570	22,510	18,250	21,414	21,099	18,469	16,197	13,615
5	Qingdao	China	East Asia	Yellow Sea	30,870	26,390	25,670	23,710	22,000	21,010	19,315	18,262	18,010	17,510	16,624	15,520	14,503	13,020	12,012	10,260	10,320	9,462	7,702	6,307	5,140
6	Guangzhou	China	East Asia	Pearl River Delta	26,070	20,800	24,857	24,180	23,190	23,236	21,992	20,370	18,858	17,625	16,160	15,309	14,744	14,400	12,550	11,190	11,001	9,200	6,600	4,685	3,308
7	Busan	South Korea	East Asia	Korean Strait	24,402	22,750	22,078	22,706	21,590	21,992	21,662	20,493	19,850	19,469	18,423	17,690	17,046	16,185	14,157	11,954	13,425	13,270	12,039	11,843	11,430
8	Tianjin	China	East Asia	Yellow Sea	23,290	21,800	21,021	20,269	18,350	17,264	15,972	15,040	14,490	14,090	14,050	13,010	12,300	11,500	10,080	8,700	8,500	7,103	5,950	4,801	3,814
9	Jebel Ali Dubai	United Arab Emirates	West Asia	Persian Gulf	15,536	14,472	13,970	13,742	13,488	14,111	14,954	15,368	14,772	15,592	14,750	13,641	13,270	13,000	11,600	11,124	11,827	10,653	8,923	7,619	6,429
10	Port Klang	Malaysia	Southeast Asia	Malacca Strait	14,645	14,061	13,220	13,724	13,240	13,580	12,316	11,978	13,170	11,887	10,736	10,350	10,000	9,604	8,870	7,309	7,970	7,120	6,326	5,544	5,244
11	Rotterdam	Netherlands	Europe	Rhine delta	13,820	13,400	14,455	15,300	14,350	14,810	14,512	13,734	12,385	12,235	12,453	11,621	11,866	11,877	11,146	9,743	10,784	10,791	9,655	9,287	8,281
12	Hong Kong	Hong Kong China	East Asia	Pearl River Delta	13,668	14,401	16,685	17,798	20,070	18,361	19,596	20,770	19,813	20,073	22,374	22,352	23,117	24,384	23,532	20,983	24,248	23,881	23,539	22,427	21,984
13	Antwerp	Belgium	Europe	Scheldt delta	13,532	12,528	13,500	12,020	12,031	11,860	11,100	10,451	10,037	9,654	9,136	8,578	8,635	8,664	8,468	7,309	8,663	8,176	7,019	6,482	6,064
14	Xiamen	China	East Asia	Taiwan Strait	12,255	12,550	12,434	12,045	11,410	11,122	10,702	10,380	9,614	9,183	8,572	8,010	7,202	6,461	5,820	4,680	5,035	4,627	4,019	3,342	
15	Tanjung Pelepas	Malaysia	Southeast Asia	Malacca Strait	12,253	10,480	10,512	11,200	9,850	9,100	8,960	8,261	8,281	9,120	8,500	7,628	7,700	7,500	6,530	6,000	5,600	5,500	4,770	4,177	4,020
16	Los Angeles	United States	North America	San Pedro Bay	10,297	8,634	19,044	20,061	17,327	16,969	17,549	17,013	15,632	15,352	15,161	14,600	14,124	14,002	14,095	11,815	14,200	15,671	15,759	14,195	7,321
17	Tanger-Med	Morocco	North Africa	Western Mediterranean	10,241	8,617	7,596	7,173	5,771	4,801	3,472	3,312	2,960												
18	Taicang / Suzhou	China	East Asia	Yangtze Delta	9,670	8,039	8,025	7,038	5,212	5,152	5,071	4,514	4,081	3,760											
19	Long Beach	United States	North America	San Pedro Bay	9,650	8,018																			5,780
20	Laem Chabang	Thailand	Southeast Asia	Gulf of Thailand	9,555	8,680	8,741	8,335	7,547	8,106	8,070	7,670	7,227	6,780	6,518	6,032	5,830	5,731	5,068	4,538	5,134	4,642	4,123	3,834	3,529
21	Kaohsiung	Taiwan	East Asia	Taiwan Strait	9,228	8,834	9,491	9,864	9,622	10,428	10,445	10,271	10,465	10,264	10,593	9,938	9,781	9,636	8,872	8,581	9,677	10,257	9,775	9,471	9,714
22	Ho Chi Minh Saigon	Vietnam	Southeast Asia	South China Sea	9,158	7,397	7,905	7,956	7,854	7,220	6,586	6,156	5,987		5,788	6,334	5,542	5,060	4,674	4,100	3,563	3,100	2,532	2,532	
23	Beibu Gulf	China	East Asia	Gulf of Tonkin	9,020	6,210	5,407	4,630	3,950	2,580	2,400	2,303	2,091												
24	New York / New Jersey	United States	North America	Hudson-Raritan Estuary	8,698	7810	9,493	8,985	7,586	7,471	7,179	6,711	6,252	6,372	5,772	5,467	5,530	5,503	5,292	4,561	5,265	5,299	5,093	4,785	4,478
25	Mundra	India	South Asia	Gulf of Kutch	8,217	7,400	6,503	6,660	6,503	5,657	4,732	4,449	4,240	3,320	2,895										
26	Tanjung Priok	Indonesia	Southeast Asia	Java Sea	7,827	7,290	6,849	6,134	7,600	7,640	6,090	5,515		5,201	5,034	6,590	6,200	5,618	4,715	3,800	3,984	3,900	3,280	3,282	3,597
27	Hamburg	Germany	Europe	Elbe River	7,800	7,700	8,261	8,715	8,540	9,274	8,730	8,860	8,910	8,821	9,729	9,302	8,864	9,022	7,900	7,007	9,737	9,890	8,862	8,088	7,003
28	Colombo	Sri Lanka	South Asia	Laccadive Sea	7,780	6,940	6,860	7,250	6,855	7,228	7,047	6,209	5,735		5,185	4,910									2,221
29	Haiphong	Vietnam	Southeast Asia	Hong River Delta	7,151	5,567.9	5,629	5,696	5,142	5,133	4,954														
30	Cai Mep, Vũng Tàu	Vietnam	Southeast Asia	South China Sea	7,083	5,482	5,593	5,385	4,411	3,742	3,567	3,065	2,261												
31	Jawaharlal Nehru	India	South Asia	Arabian Sea	7,053	6,354	5,959	5,630	4,470	5,100	5,051	4,833	4,432	4,490	4,450										2,361
32	Rizhao	China	East Asia	Yellow Sea	6,710	6,260	5,804	5,174	4,860	4,500	4,000	3,240	3,010	2,810											
33	Lianyungang	China	East Asia	Yellow Sea	6,691	6,140	5,570	5,090	4,800	4,780	4,750	4,711	4,703	4,703											
34	Yingkou	China	East Asia	Liaodong Bay	5,560	5,331	4,995	5,207	5,650	5,480	6,487	6,278	6,086		5,922	5,770									
35	Savannah	United States	North America	East Coast	5,546	4,927	5,892	5,613	4,682	4,599	4,350	4,046	3,645	3,737	3,346	3,034	2,966	2,945	2,825	2,356	2,616	2,604	2,160	1,902	
36	Manila	Philippines	Southeast Asia	Manila Bay	5,503	5,209	5,474	4,976	4,443	5,315	5,085	4,782	4,523	3,976	3,673	3,770	3,705	3,250	3,257	2,815	2,977	2,800	2,638	2,625	2,698
37	Santos	Brazil	South America	South Atlantic Ocean	5,485	4,783	4,986	4,831	4,232	4,165	4,120	3,854	3,394	3,645	3,685	3,446	3,172	2,985	2,716	2,252	2,675	2,533	2,208	2,240	1,883
38	Valencia	Spain	Europe	Western Mediterranean	5,476	4,804	5,052	5,604	5,428	5,439	5,128	4,832	4,722	4,616	4,442	4,328	4,470	4,327	4,207	3,653	3,593	3,043	2,612	2,410	2,145
39	Abu Dhabi	United Arab Emirates	West Asia	Persian Gulf	5,421	4,910	4,330	3,440	3,220	2,780	1,740	1,400													
40	Dalian	China	East Asia	Yellow Sea	5,400	5,028	4,459	3,672	5,110	10,210	9,770	9,707	9,614	9,450	10,128	10,860	8,060	6,400	5,242	4,552	4,503	4,574	3,212	2,665	2,211
41	Colón	Panama	Central America	Caribbean Sea	5,395	4,868	5,102	4,916	4,454	4,379	3,890	3,891	3,258	3,577	3,356	2,060	1,900	1,600	2,802	1,856	2,262	N/A	1,947	2,150	
42	Yantai	China	East Asia	Yellow Sea	5,090	4,627	4,117	3,651	3,300	3,102	3,001														
43	Piraeus	Greece	Europe	Eastern Mediterranean	4,792	5,100	5,000	5,311	5,437	5,648	4,907	4,145	3,737	3,330	3,164	2,745	1,680	1,198	665	434	1,373	N/A	N/A	N/A	
44	Algeciras	Spain	Europe	Western Mediterranean	4,713	4,733	4,767	4,799	5,108	5,125	4,773	4,340	4,761	4,516	4,457	4,501	4,114	3,603	2,810	3,042	3,324	3,152	3,257	3,180	2,937
45	Tokyo	Japan	East Asia	Tokyo Bay	4,701	4,570	4,430	4,326	4,260	4,510	4,570	4,500	4,700	4,629	4,917	4,861	4,752	4,640	4,286	3,810	4,271	3,818	3,969	3,593	3,358
46	Bremen	Germany	Europe	North Sea	4,445	4,181	4,572	5,018	4,767	4,856	5,450	5,510	5,535	5,479	5,796	5,831	6,115	5,915	4,871	4,578	5,529	4,912	4,450	3,736	3,469
47	Tanjung Perak	Indonesia	Southeast Asia	Madura Strait	4,300	4,100	3,972	3,901	3,602																
48	Houston	United States	North America	Gulf of Mexico	4,140	3,824	3,974	3,453	3,001	2,987	2,701														
49	Dongguan	China	East Asia	Pearl River Delta	4,018	3,901	-																		
50	Balboa	Panama	Central America	Panama Bay	4,014																				
51	Gioia Tauro	Italy	Europe	Mediterranean Sea	3,941																				3,261
	Port Said	Egypt	North Africa	North of Suez Canal		4,438	4,252	4,765	4,010	3,816	3,105	2,968	3,036	3,462	3,036	4,100	3,631	4,272	3,646	3,300	3,202	2,127	2,127	1,522	
	Jeddah	Saudi Arabia	West Asia	Red Sea		5,586	4,960	4,882	4,737	4,433	4,120	4,150	3,957	4,188	4,200	4,561	4,738	4,010	3,830	3,091	3,326	3,068	2,964	2,836	2,426
	Salalah	Oman	West Asia	Arabian Sea		3,790	4,504	4,510	4,340	4,109	3,390	3,946	3,325	2,569											2,229
	Yantian	China	East Asia	Mirs Bay																					2,872
	Yokohama	Japan	East Asia	Tokyo Bay																					2,718
	Felixstowe	United Kingdom	Europe	North Sea																					2,675
	Kobe	Japan	East Asia	Osaka Bay																					2,177
	Nagoya	Japan	East Asia	Ise Bay																					2,155
	HAROPA	France	Europe	Seine																					2,132
	Keelung	Taiwan	East Asia	East China Sea																					2,070
	Oakland	United States	North America	San Francisco Bay																					2,043
	Osaka	Japan	East Asia	Osaka Bay																					2,009
	Virginia	United States	North America	Hampton Roads																					1,982
	Melbourne	Australia	Australia																						1,910
	Barcelona	Spain	Europe	Western Mediterranean																					1,883
	Charleston	United States	North America																						1,864
	Khor Fakkan	United Arab Emirates	West Asia	Gulf of Oman																					1,819
	Tacoma	United States	North America																						1,798
	Seattle	United States	North America																						1,776
	Durban	South Africa	South Africa																						1,717

== See also ==
- United States container ports
- List of largest container shipping companies
- List of largest container ships
- List of busiest ports in Europe
- List of countries by container port traffic
