= National Route 1C (Vietnam) =

Road in Vietnam

National Route 1C
- Quốc lộ 1C
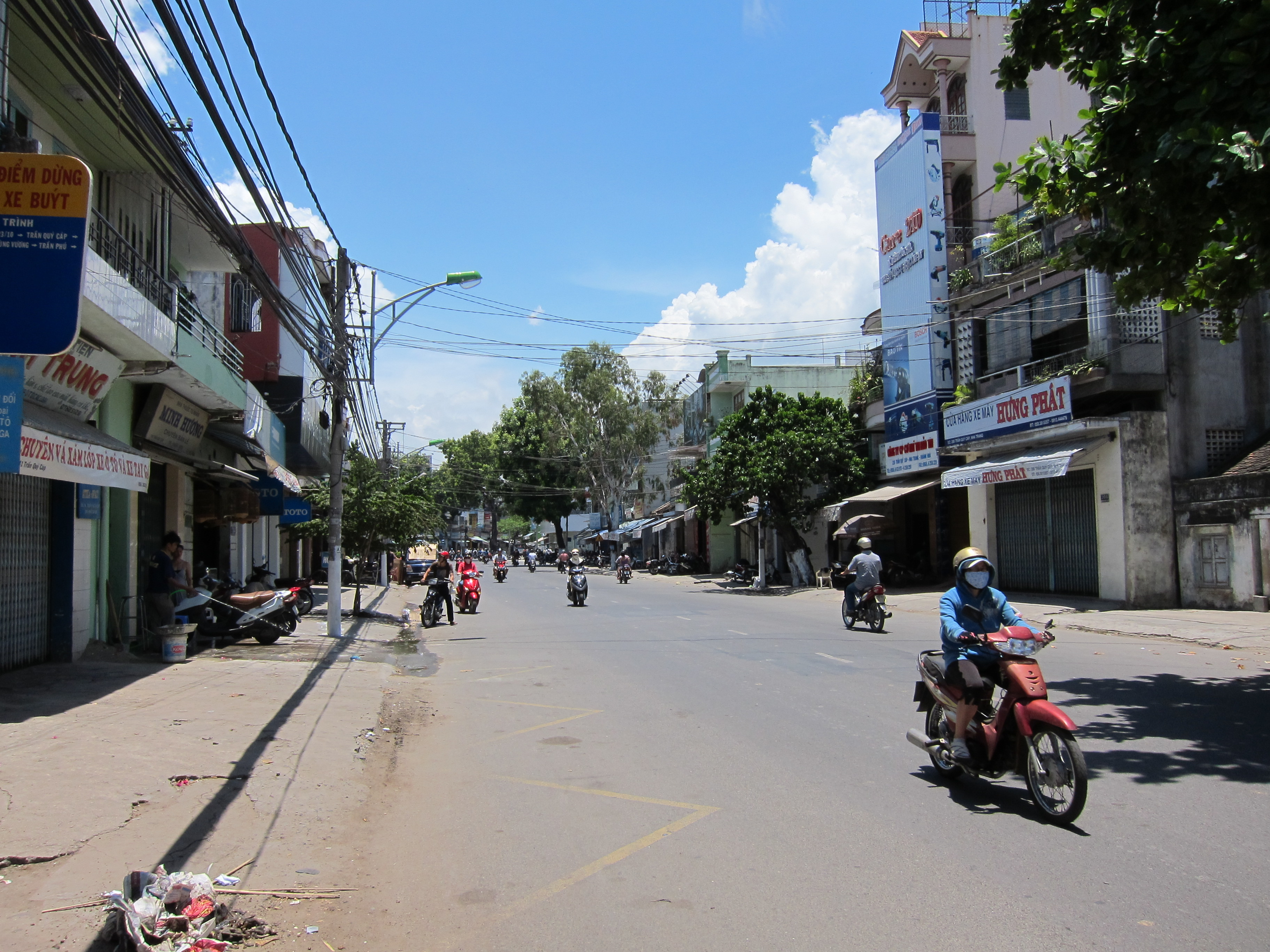

Route information
- Length: 17.3 km (10.7 mi)

Major junctions
- West end: at Thanh junction, Diên Khánh, Nha Trang
- East end: at Rù Rì Pass in Vĩnh Lương, Nha Trang

Location
- Country: Vietnam

Highway system
- Transport in Vietnam
← QL 1B	→ QL 1D

National Route 1C is a 17.3 km long road running west–east in Khanh Hoa province. starting at the Ri Ri Pass in Vinh Luong Commune, Nha Trang City, and ending at Thanh T-junction, Dien town, Dien Khanh district. Route 1C was the main route of Route 1A before it was rerouted to bypass Nha Trang.
