= Binh Gia =

Binh Gia may refer to several places in Vietnam, including:

- Bình Gia District, a rural district of Lạng Sơn Province
- Bình Gia, a township and capital of Bình Gia District
- Bình Giã, a rural commune of Châu Đức District in Bà Rịa-Vũng Tàu Province
