= National Route 91 (Vietnam) =

Road in Vietnam

National Route 91
- Quốc lộ 91

Route information
- Length: 145 km (90 mi)

Major junctions
- Southeast end: in Cần Thơ
- in Long Thành, Cần Thơ; in Thoi Thuan, Thốt Nốt District; in Vam Cong, Long Xuyên; in Châu Đốc; in Tịnh Biên
- Northwest end: N2 at Tịnh Biên Border Gate, Cambodian border

Location
- Country: Vietnam

Highway system
- Transport in Vietnam
← QL 80	→ QL 100

National Route 91 (Vietnamese: Quốc lộ 91) is highway in the Mekong Delta region of Vietnam, stretching from Cần Thơ, the largest city in the delta, northwest toward the border town of Tịnh Biên, near Cambodia. The highway continues into Cambodia as National Route 2 and eventually leads to the Cambodian capital of Phnom Penh.

The highway starts at Cần Thơ city, the capital of Cần Thơ Province, diverging from National Route 1, and heads northwest, parallel to the Hau River, the main branch of the Mekong River in the delta region. The highway passes through the towns of Ô Môn, Thốt Nốt District before reaching the regional centre of Long Xuyên, the capital of neighbouring An Giang Province, the westernmost province of Vietnam bordering Cambodia. Approximately 40 km further northwest along the highway is Châu Đốc, the site of an airport, before the road turns southwest and straddles the Cambodian border for approximately 20 km before turning northwest again and crossing the Cambodian border.

The 18 km segment from Ô Môn District to Cai Cui Port is designated as National Route 91B and the section from Chau Doc to the Cambodian border in Long Binh (former Provincial Road 956) is designated as National Route 91C.
