= Bình Gia =

Bình Gia Xã Bình Gia
- Commune
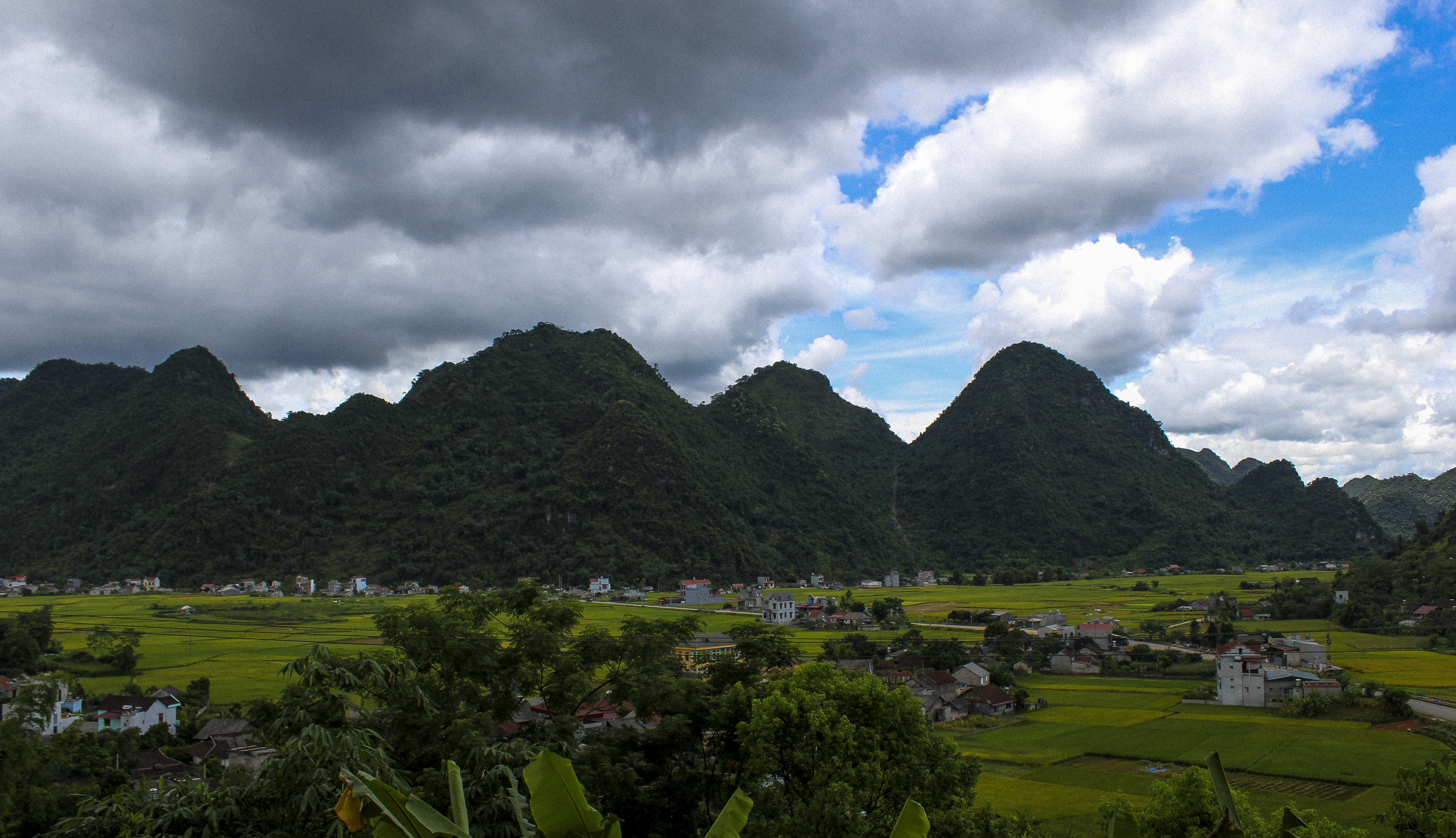
- Skyline of Bình Gia

- Location in Vietnam
- Coordinates: 21°57′27″N 106°22′09″E
- Country: Vietnam
- Region: Northeast
- Province: Lạng Sơn
- Established: June 16th 2025

Area
  - Total: 40.53 sq mi (104.98 km^{2})

Population (2025)
  - Total: 15,008
  - Density: 370.27/sq mi (142.96/km^{2})
- Time zone: UTC+7 (UTC+7)

Bình Gia is a commune (xã) of Lạng Sơn Province, Vietnam.

== Traffic ==
National Route 1B and National Route 279 runs through Bình Gia.
