= Thốt Nốt district =

Coordinates: 10.167°N 105.417°E

Thốt Nốt district Quận Thốt Nốt
- Urban district
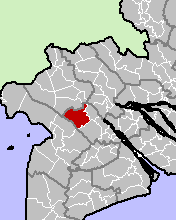
- Location in Cần Thơ province.
- Country: Vietnam
- Province: Cần Thơ
- Capital: Thốt Nốt

Area
  - Total: 66 sq mi (171 km^{2})

Population (2019)
  - Total: 155.360
- Time zone: UTC+7 (Indochina Time)

Thốt Nốt is a former urban district of the city of Cần Thơ in the Mekong Delta region of Vietnam. To the south and west it borders Vĩnh Thạnh district and An Giang province, and to the north with Đồng Tháp province.

On June 16, 2025, the Standing Committee of the National Assembly issued Resolution No. 1685/NQ-UBTVQH15. The district was dissolved and new wards were rearranged from the district.

== Demographics ==
As of 2003 the district had a population of 192,327. By 2007 this had risen to 196,610. The district covers an area of 171 km^{2}. The district capital lies at Thốt Nốt.

== Administrative divisions ==
The district is divided into 9 wards:

Thới Thuận, Thuận An, Thốt Nốt, Thạnh Hòa, Trung Nhứt, Trung Kiên, Thuận Hưng, Tân Hưng and Tân Lộc.
