= List of countries by container port traffic =

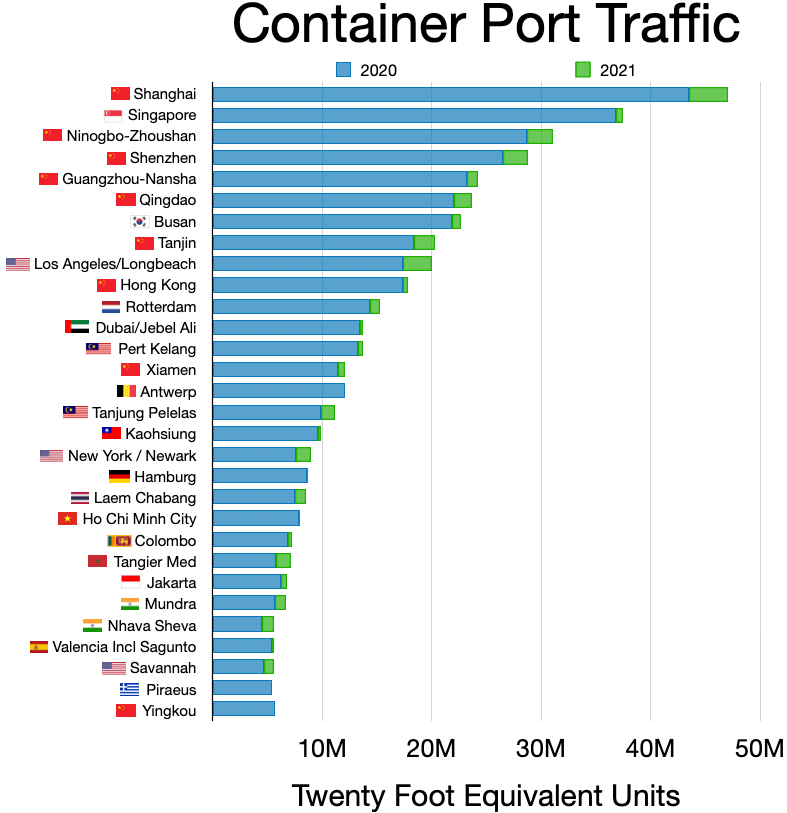
Busiest container ports 2020-2021

The following list sorts countries and territories by volume of container port traffic in Twenty-foot equivalent unit (TEU) according to data from the World Bank.

Rank	Country / Region	Container port traffic in TEUs	Year
1	China	299,703,800	2024
2	United States	59,707,490	2024
3	Singapore	41,124,100	2024
4	South Korea	31,850,924	2024
5	Malaysia	30,659,850	2024
6	Vietnam	24,423,183	2024
7	India	23,898,000	2024
8	United Arab Emirates	23,466,906	2024
9	Japan	21,886,683	2024
10	Spain	18,114,517	2024
11	Indonesia	14,709,550	2024
12	Netherlands	14,517,179	2024
13	Brazil	13,893,906	2024
14	Hong Kong	13,690,000	2024
15	Turkey	13,507,070	2024
16	Germany	13,294,081	2024
17	Belgium	12,395,047	2024
18	Italy	11,927,016	2024
19	Morocco	11,789,130	2024
20	Thailand	11,432,626	2024
21	United Kingdom	9,621,469	2024
22	Australia	9,579,396	2024
23	Panama	9,570,767	2024
24	Mexico	9,284,170	2024
25	Philippines	9,216,842	2024
26	Egypt	8,581,339	2024
27	Saudi Arabia	8,029,571	2024
28	Sri Lanka	7,782,776	2024
29	Canada	6,394,038	2024
30	Greece	5,691,448	2024
31	France	5,371,045	2024
32	Colombia	5,188,127	2024
33	Russia	5,187,096	2024
34	Chile	4,474,125	2024
35	South Africa	4,303,682	2024
36	Oman	4,246,786	2024
37	Portugal	3,541,777	2024
38	Peru	3,477,011	2024
39	New Zealand	3,371,175	2024
40	Bangladesh	3,353,732	2024
41	Pakistan	3,338,000	2024
42	Poland	3,270,784	2024
43	Israel	3,059,136	2024
44	Malta	2,967,924	2024
45	Iran	2,921,359	2024
46	Ecuador	2,567,040	2024
47	Jamaica	2,349,405	2024
48	Dominican Republic	2,110,608	2024
49	Guatemala	2,010,490	2024
50	Togo	2,006,435	2024
51	Kenya	2,005,076	2024
52	Algeria	1,827,788	2024
53	Ivory Coast	1,802,000	2024
54	Costa Rica	1,717,439	2024
55	Ghana	1,701,246	2024
56	Sweden	1,640,487	2024
57	Nigeria	1,566,109	2024
58	Bahamas	1,540,740	2024
59	Argentina	1,471,434	2024
60	Qatar	1,421,000	2024
61	Finland	1,317,452	2024
62	Puerto Rico	1,300,000	2024
63	Djibouti	1,293,000	2024
64	Ireland	1,209,552	2024
65	Slovenia	1,133,340	2024
66	Uruguay	1,115,000	2024
67	Lithuania	1,068,771	2024
68	Republic of the Congo	1,046,064	2024
69	Cambodia	1,030,000	2024
70	Ukraine	1,022,376	2021
71	Romania	989,795	2024
72	Tanzania	985,000	2024
73	Denmark	935,848	2024
74	Iraq	932,729	2019
75	Honduras	905,497	2024
76	Senegal	881,239	2024
77	Kuwait	863,618	2020
78	Norway	862,983	2024
79	Jordan	824,199	2024
80	Myanmar	782,951	2024
81	Lebanon	762,062	2024
82	Angola	709,221	2024
83	Georgia	636,497	2024
84	Trinidad and Tobago	545,177	2023
85	Croatia	532,451	2024
86	Benin	510,996	2019
87	Tunisia	491,955	2024
88	Latvia	490,971	2024
89	Mozambique	489,000	2023
90	Mauritius	468,254	2024
91	Libya	465,168	2023
92	South Sudan	430,000	2011
93	Iceland	425,000	2023
94	Bahrain	409,382	2024
95	Cyprus	386,498	2024
96	Yemen	380,000	2024
97	Cameroon	350,000	2024
98	Sudan	320,274	2021
99	Bulgaria	296,350	2024
100	Guinea	286,286	2023
101	Austria	285,900	2017
102	Cuba	281,140	2023
103	Estonia	261,822	2024
104	El Salvador	255,017	2024
105	Syria	243,348	2020
106	Venezuela	221,081	2021
107	Haiti	201,514	2024
108	Papua New Guinea	200,000	2022
109	Madagascar	199,713	2019
110	Guam	190,200	2019
111	Albania	184,017	2023
112	Gabon	180,878	2024
113	Namibia	171,151	2024
114	Nicaragua	167,682	2024
115	Seychelles	154,423	2019
116	Fiji	145,782	2019
117	Solomon Islands	128,036	2019
118	Switzerland	114,075	2020
119	New Caledonia	107,834	2021
120	Maldives	107,728	2019
121	Suriname	105,949	2024
122	Sint Maarten	105,200	2019
123	Barbados	101,300	2023
124	Brunei	99,000	2023
125	Curaçao	98,100	2024
126	Somalia	92,238	2019
127	Liberia	91,454	2019
128	Cape Verde	89,382	2024
129	French Polynesia	84,772	2022
130	Mauritania	84,458	2019
131	Sierra Leone	78,413	2019
132	Vanuatu	77,436	2019
133	Tonga	76,854	2019
134	American Samoa	76,200	2019
135	Gambia	71,470	2019
136	Aruba	64,800	2024
137	Guyana	58,377	2021
138	Comoros	54,359	2019
139	East Timor	53,289	2019
140	Samoa	53,017	2024
141	Kiribati	52,100	2019
142	São Tomé and Príncipe	49,553	2019
143	Cayman Islands	46,658	2024
144	British Virgin Islands	45,956	2019
145	Northern Mariana Islands	44,952	2019
146	Democratic Republic of the Congo	42,211	2019
147	Paraguay	37,901	2020
148	Saint Lucia	37,054	2023
149	Faroe Islands	31,214	2019
150	Marshall Islands	30,711	2019
151	Guinea-Bissau	28,700	2019
152	Antigua and Barbuda	28,000	2024
153	Eritrea	27,453	2019
154	Federated States of Micronesia	25,234	2019
155	Saint Vincent and the Grenadines	24,416	2024
156	Belize	21,279	2023
157	Grenada	20,299	2022
158	Montenegro	17,263	2024
159	Palau	16,399	2019
160	Equatorial Guinea	9,951	2019
161	Saint Kitts and Nevis	13,560	2020
162	Gibraltar	10,870	2019
163	Dominica	7,401	2020
165	Greenland	6,145	2019
166	Nauru	5,327	2019
167	Tuvalu	5,150	2019
168	Bermuda	4,006	2019
169	Moldova	818	2019
	World	913,279,048	2024
