= Thốt Nốt =

- Ward
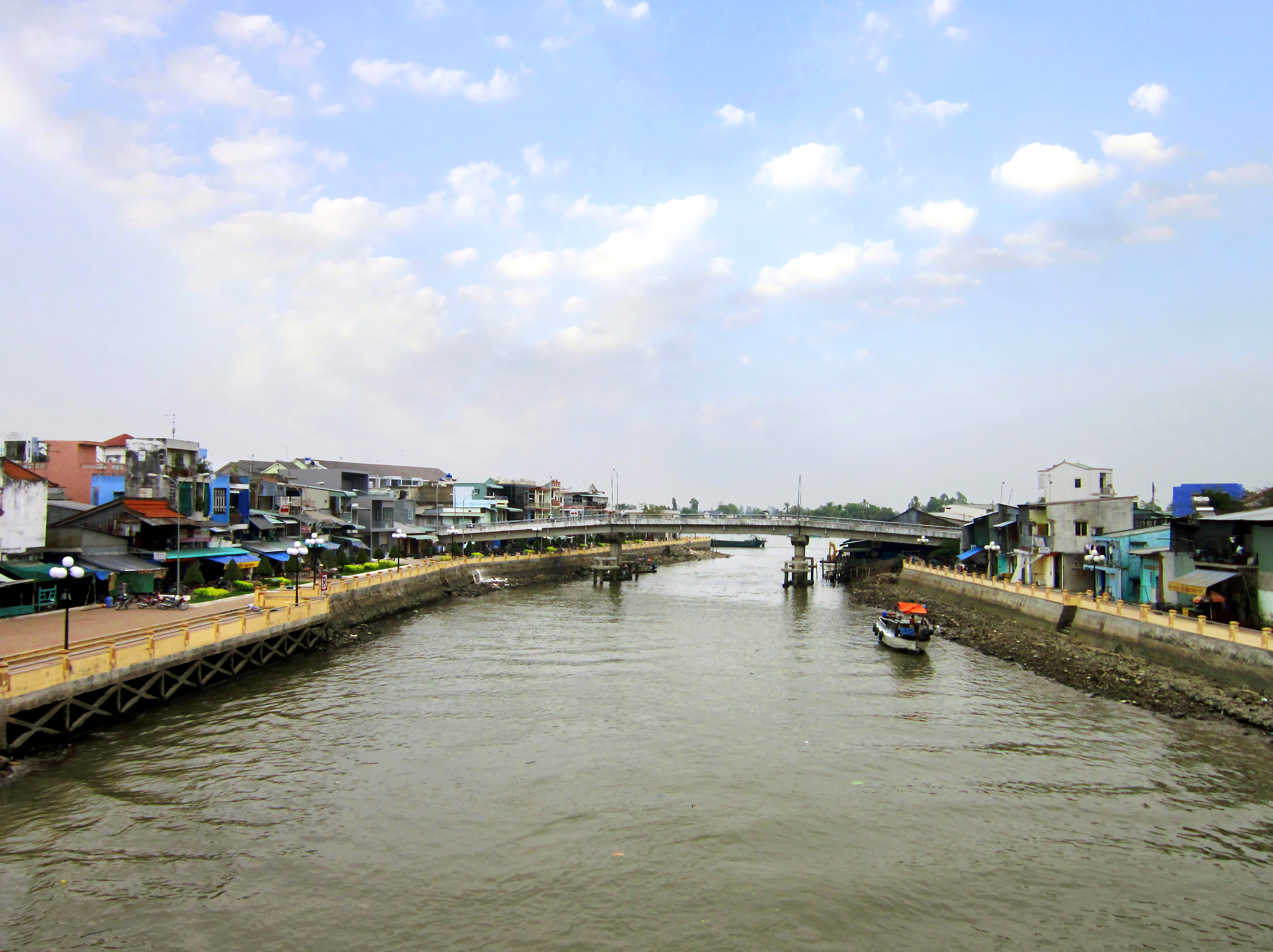
- At the mouth of the Thốt Nốt canal
- Interactive map of Thốt Nốt
- Coordinates: 10°16′24″N 105°31′6″E
- Country: Vietnam
- Municipality: Cần Thơ
- Region: Mekong Delta
- Established: 2008
- Seat: National Route 91, Khu vực Long Thạnh 2

Area
  - Total: 23.61 km^{2} (9.12 sq mi)

Population (31 December 2024)
  - Total: 61,387
  - Density: 2,600/km^{2} (6,700/sq mi)
- Website: thotnot.cantho.gov.vn

Thốt Nốt is a ward in Cần Thơ, Vietnam.

On 12 June 2025, the National Assembly of Vietnam adopted Resolution No. 202/2025/QH15 on the reorganization of provincial-level administrative units, which took effect on the same date. Under the resolution, Hậu Giang province and Sóc Trăng province were merged into Cần Thơ.

On 16 June 2025, the National Assembly adopted Resolution No. 203/2025/QH15 on amendments and supplements to several articles of the Constitution of the Socialist Republic of Vietnam. Under the resolution, district-level administrative units nationwide ceased operations from 1 July 2025.

Also on 16 June 2025, the Standing Committee of the National Assembly of Vietnam adopted Resolution No. 1668/NQ-UBTVQH15 on the reorganization of commune-level administrative units in Cần Thơ in 2025. Under the resolution, 0.94 km² of land and a population of 4,789 from Thốt Nốt ward were transferred to Thuận Hưng ward in the former Thốt Nốt town.

Under the same resolution, Thốt Nốt ward was established in Cần Thơ from the entire area and population of Thuận An ward, comprising 8.07 km² and 15,850 people; Thới Thuận ward, comprising 10.83 km² and 25,146 people; and the remaining 4.71 km² and 20,391 people of Thốt Nốt ward in the former Thốt Nốt town.
