= Tịnh Biên =

Cities and wards in An Giang province, Vietnam

- Urban municipality and town
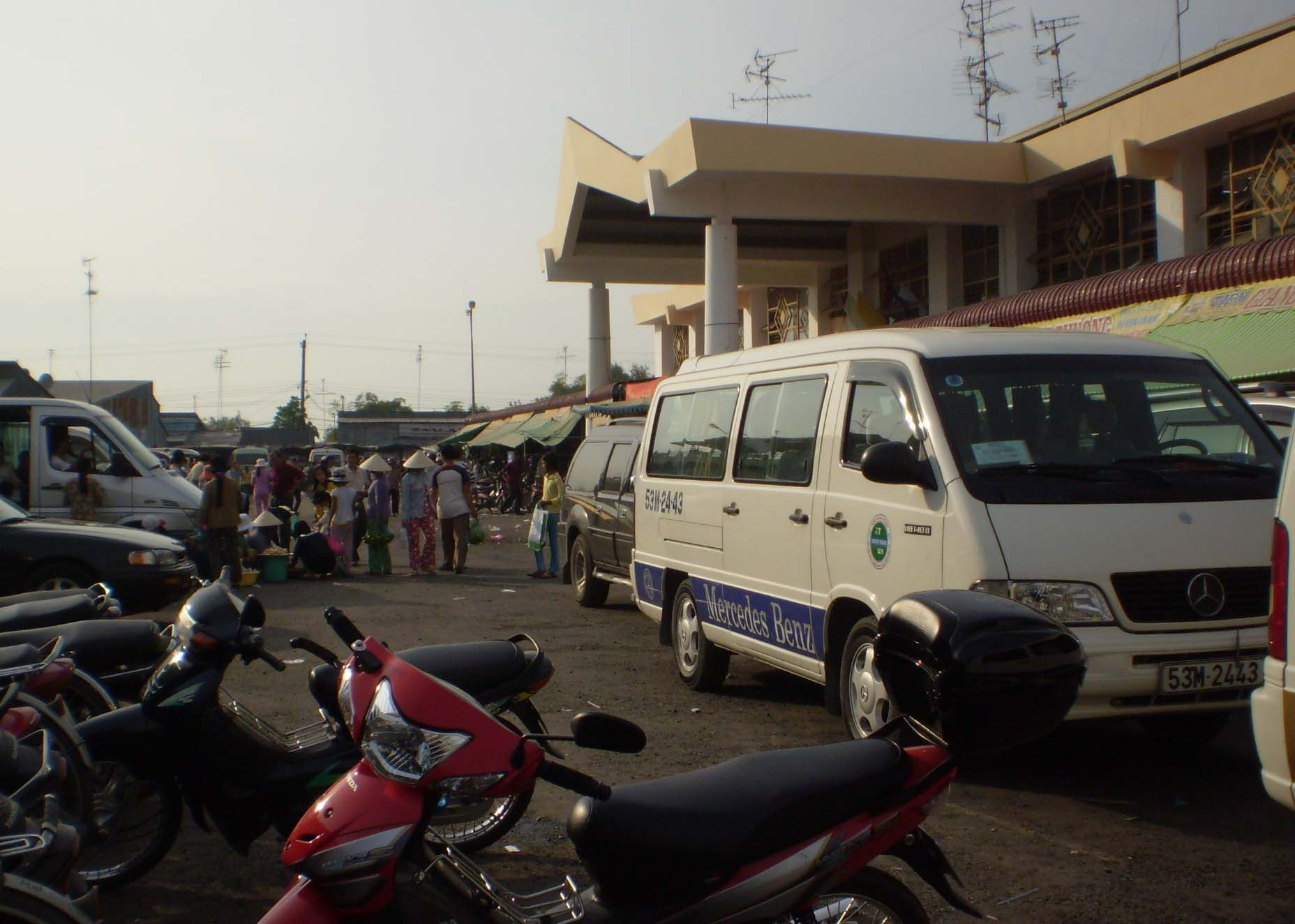
- Tịnh Biên town

- Location in Vietnam
- Coordinates: 10°35′N 105°0′E
- Country: Vietnam
- Province: An Giang Province
- Time zone: UTC+07:00
- Climate: Aw

Tịnh Biên is an urban ward (phường) of the An Giang Province, Vietnam.

Tịnh Biên was depicted in Robin Moore's fiction book The Green Berets; chapter 1 described a real-life battle during the Vietnam War in which all of the members of a United States Army Special Forces detachment were injured during the fighting.
