= Saigon Port =

- Saigon Port headquarters next to the Dragon House
- Interactive map of Saigon Port
- Native name: Công ty Cổ phần Cảng Sài Gòn (Vietnamese)

Location
- Country: Vietnam
- Location: Ho Chi Minh City
- Coordinates: 10°46′06″N 106°42′27″E

Details
- sea port: 10 m (33 ft)

Statistics
- Website; Official website

Saigon Port is a network of ports in Ho Chi Minh City. It is a major main port for Vietnam (which has six main sea ports), and the only able to handle post-Panamax ships. Its headquarter located next to the Dragon House in Xóm Chiếu. The port name is derived from the former name of the city. In 2013, it became the 24th busiest container port in the world. The system is largely managed by Saigon Port JSC, a subsidiary of Vietnam Maritime Corporation (VIMC).

== History ==
Saigon Port played an important role in the foundation and development of the city of Saigon. During the era of French Indochina, the port played a significant role in the import and export of materials from the colony. Today the original port is still used for river excursion ships and a floating restaurant.

Today, this port network is the hub for the export and import of goods in south Vietnam – the economic hub of the nation, which accounts for more than two-thirds of Vietnam's economy, and the Mekong delta farming as one of the more productive in the world, and the main producer of cereals (rice) and shrimp in Vietnam.

== Operations ==
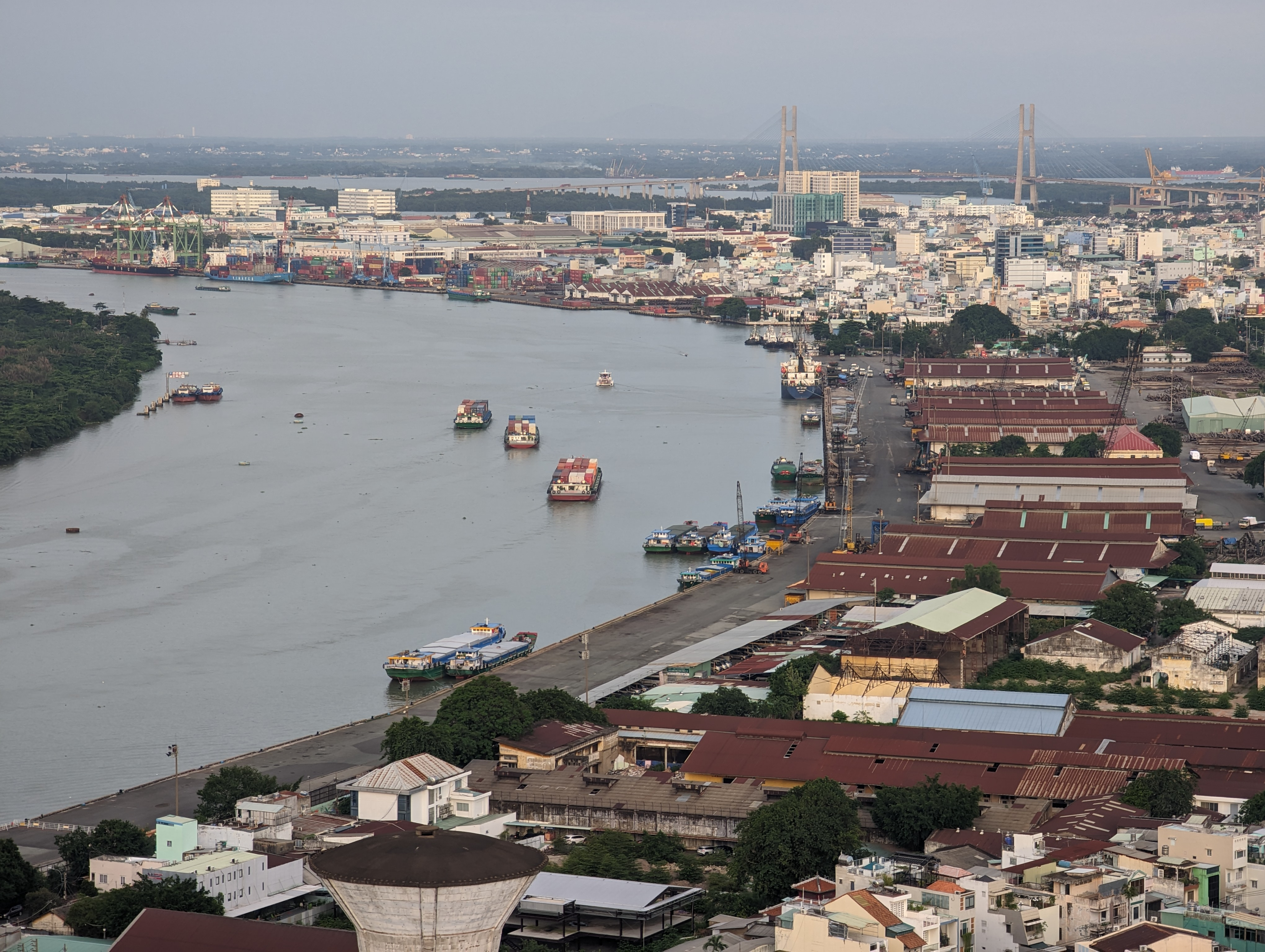
Nhà Rồng–Khánh Hội Pier of the Saigon Port on Saigon River

In 2006, Saigon Port handled more than 35 million metric tons of cargo and 1.5 million TEU of containers. By the end of 2012, Saigon Port now handled 3.5 million TEU of containers, an increase of 14% from 2011.

From the Saigon port there is inland waterway navigation into Cambodia.

The other container ports of Vietnam are Hai Phong Port, Da Nang Port, Nha Trang and Quy Nhon.

== Relocation ==
Due to urban planning, the main Saigon Port has been relocated from the city center to the outskirts of Ho Chi Minh City, specifically to the Hiep Phuoc New Urban and Port Area, Cát Lái Port area in Cát Lái and especially to Cái Mép–Thị Vải, 60 km Southeast of Saigon and 30 km northwest of Vũng Tàu. The Cái Mép–Thị Vải Port with the capacity of handling ships up to 50,000 tons will be the leading deepwater port of this region.
