= National Route 1D (Vietnam) =

Road in Vietnam

National Route 1D
- Quốc lộ 1D
- Map of National Route 1D
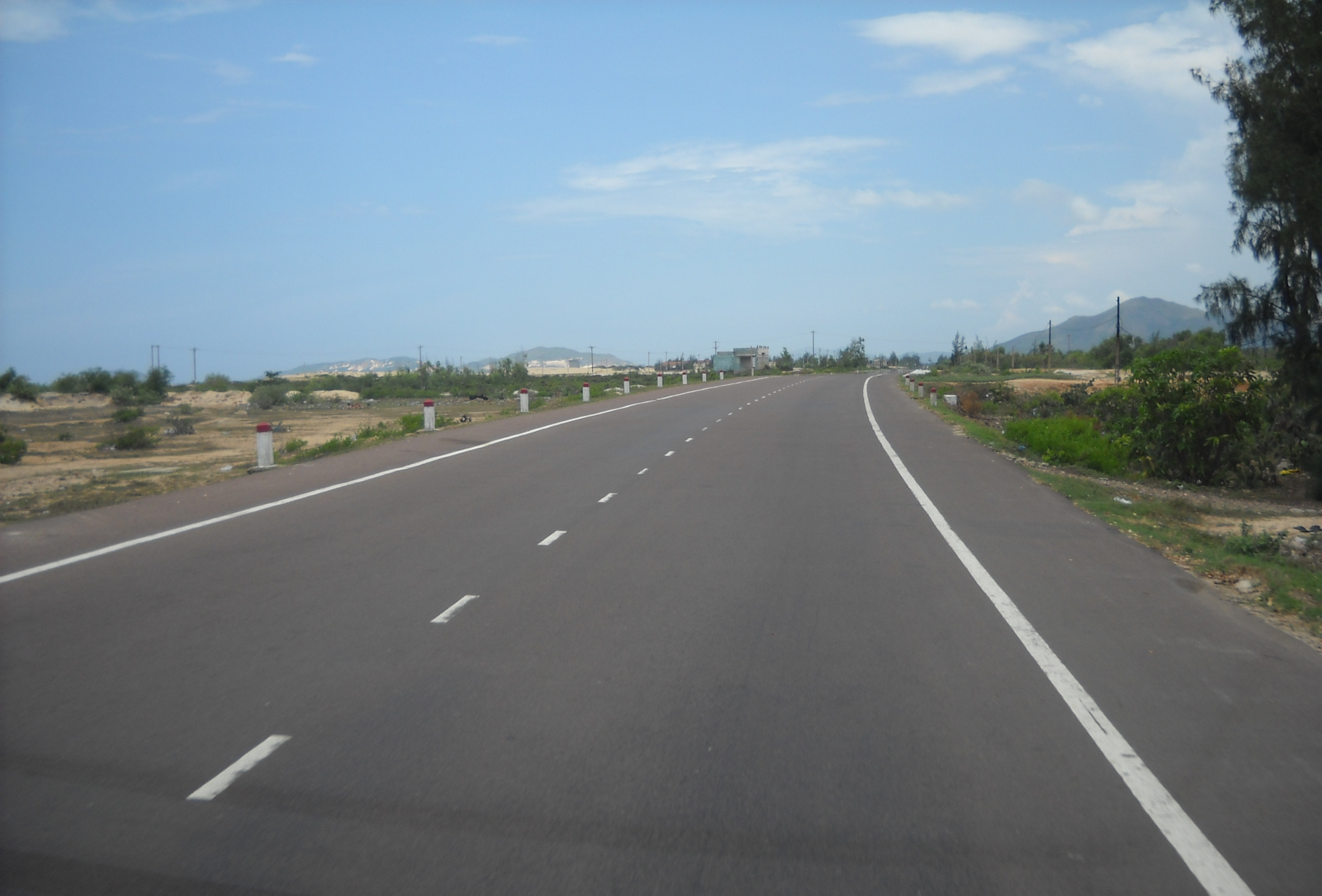
- National Route 1D near Sông Cầu

Route information
- Length: 33 km (21 mi)

Major junctions
- North end: in Quy Nhơn, Gia Lai province
- South end: in Sông Cầu, Đắk Lắk province

Location
- Country: Vietnam

Highway system
- Transport in Vietnam

National Route 1D (Vietnamese: Quốc lộ 1D (or abbrv. QL 1D)) is a road in South Central Coast of Vietnam. It connects QL 1 to Quy Nhơn and continues along the coast to Sông Cầu in Đắk Lắk province rejoining QL 1A.

The total length of the route is 33 km. The route runs along the coastal tourist area South of Quy Nhon to Sông Cầu.

== Road layout ==
Route 1D runs through the following places:

- Quy Nhơn, Bình Định province, where it connects with QL1
- Tuy Phong
- Sông Cầu District, Phú Yên province, where it connects with QL1

== Specifications ==
- Total length: 33 km
- Road width: 10 m
- Road surface: paved with asphalt

== Controversies ==
In early September 2018, several hotels and resorts were found connecting to the national highway without authorization, violating traffic safety regulations.

By early 2019, Giao Thông News reported that National Highway 1D in Bình Định had deteriorated, with numerous "potholes" causing safety hazards, though the damage was subsequently repaired.
