= National Route 1B (Vietnam) =

Road in Vietnam

National Route 1B
- Quốc lộ 1B
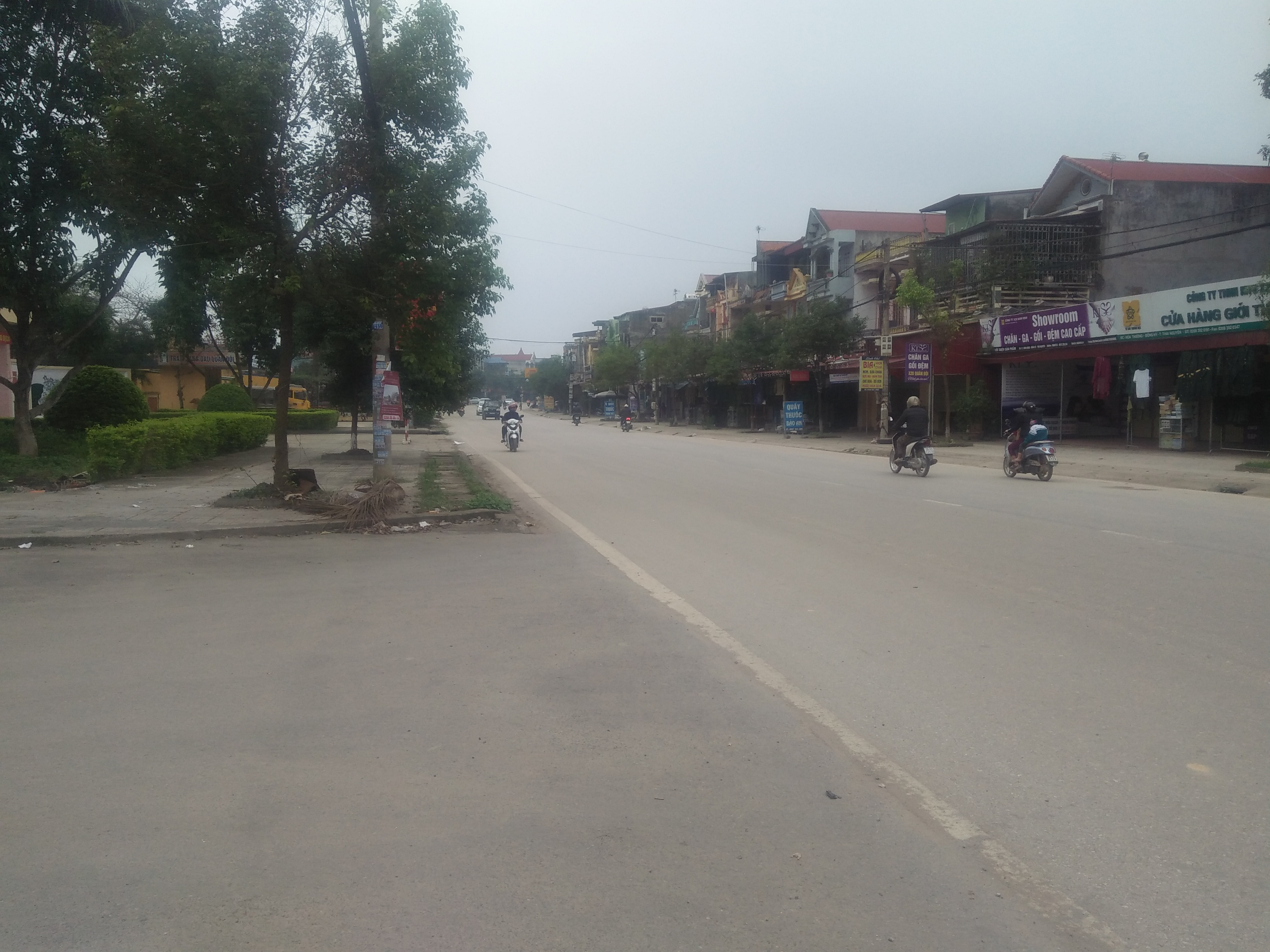

Route information
- Length: 135 km (84 mi)

Major junctions
- East end: QL 1 / QL 4A in Dong Dang, Cao Loc

- QL 239 in Van Quan; QL 239 in Binh Gia
- East end: intersection near the Gia Bay Bridge, Thái Nguyên

Location
- Country: Vietnam

Highway system
- Transport in Vietnam
← QL 1	→ QL 1C

National Route 1B is a 135 km long east-west Vietnamese highway. The starting point is in Dong Dang town, Cao Loc district, Lang Son province at the intersection of National highways 1 and 4A. The end of the route is at the crossroads near Gia Bay bridge in Thai Nguyen city. National Route 1B runs through the districts of Cao Loc, Van Quan, Binh Gia, Bac Son, Vo Nhai, and Dong Hy.
