= Vũng Tàu Port =

Coordinates: 10.386°N 107.085°E

Vung Tau Port
- Interactive map of Vung Tau Port

Location
- Country: Vietnam
- Location: Vũng Tàu

Vung Tau Port is a group of seaports, one of the sea transport hubs of Vietnam. Vung Tau Port is located in Ho Chi Minh City, Southeast region, Vietnam.

Vung Tau port includes the following component ports:

- Cai Mep - Thi Vai Port, Sao Mai-Ben Dinh: This is the main port for container transport. Currently, the port is capable of receiving ships up to 200,000 DWT. The main container terminals are TCTT/TCIT, CMIT, TCTT, SSIT and Gemalink (expected to officially open January 2020).
- Ports of Phu My, My Xuan: a general port, a container port capable of receiving ships up to 30,000 DWT. As planned by the government of Vietnam, this port will be capable of receiving ships up to 80,000 DWT.
- Port on Dinh river: is capable of receiving ships up to 20,000 DWT, and will be capable to handle ships up to 30,000 DWT.
- Port of Ben Dam, Con Dao Island.

According to the approved plan, from now to 2020, two more harbors will be built, one is the Long Son Port serving the oil refinery, the other is Sao Mai-Ben Dinh serving passenger transportation.

National Route 51 connects Cai Mep - Thi Vai Port to the manufacturing centres in Đồng Nai Province.
