= Xuyên Mộc =

Xuyên Mộc Xã Xuyên Mộc Bông Trang, Bưng Riềng
- Commune
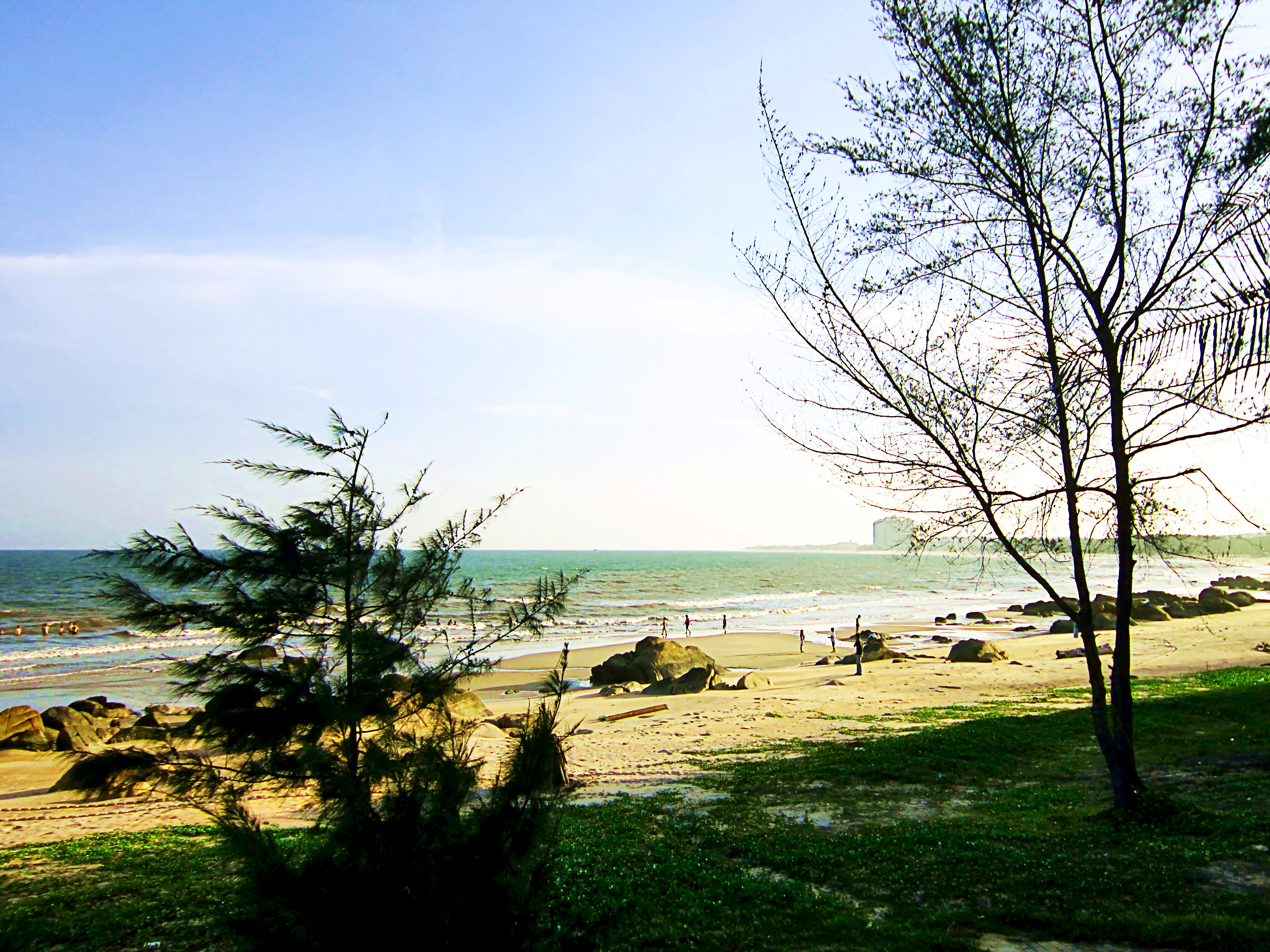
- Hồ Cốc Beach
- Interactive map of Xuyên Mộc
- Coordinates: 10°33′38″N 107°25′29″E
- Country: Vietnam
- Municipality: Ho Chi Minh City
- Established: June 16, 2025

Area
  - Total: 39.75 sq mi (102.96 km^{2})

Population (2024)
  - Total: 26,917
  - Density: 677.10/sq mi (261.43/km^{2})
- Time zone: UTC+07:00 (Indochina Time)
- Administrative code: 26632

Xuyên Mộc (Vietnamese: Xã Xuyên Mộc) is a commune of Ho Chi Minh City, Vietnam. It is one of the 168 new wards, communes and special zones of the city following the reorganization in 2025.

== Geography ==
Xuyên Mộc is a coastal commune at southeastern of Ho Chi Minh City, 35 km to the east of Bà Rịa, 48 km to the northeast of Vũng Tàu is 35 km and 105 km to the southeast of Saigon, it is part of the former Xuyên Mộc district, Bà Rịa–Vũng Tàu province. It borders with:

- Bình Châu to the east
- Hồ Tràm to the west by Ray River
- Hòa Hội to the north
- South China Sea to the south

According to Official Dispatch No. 2896/BNV-CQĐP dated May 27, 2025 of the Ministry of Home Affairs, following the merger, Hồ Tràm has a land area of 102.96 km^{2}, the population as of December 31, 2024 is 51,895 people, the population density is 261.43 people/km^{2}.

== Division ==
Xuyên Mộc commune is divided into 15 hamlets (ấp): 1, 2, 3, 4, Nhân Đức, Nhân Hòa, Nhân Nghĩa, Nhân Tâm, Nhân Thuận, Nhân Tiến, Nhân Trí, Nhân Trung, Trang Định, Trang Hoàng, Trang Trí.

== History ==
On February 24, 1976, the Provisional Revolutionary Government of the Republic of South Vietnam issued a decree on the dissolution of districts and the merger of provinces in South Vietnam. Accordingly, Đồng Nai province was established based on the natural area and population size of the provinces of Phước Tuy, Biên Hòa và Long Khánh.

At that time, the communes of Bông Trang, Bưng Riềng and Xuyên Mộc were under Xuyên Mộc district of Đồng Nai province.

On August 12, 1991, the National Assembly issued a Resolution on the adjustment of administrative boundaries of some provinces and centrally-administered cities. Accordingly:

- Bà Rịa–Vũng Tàu province was established based on the natural area and population size of:
  1. Vũng Tàu–Côn Đảo special administrative zone
  2. 3 district of Đồng Nai province are: Long Đất, Châu Thành (later split into the cities of Bà Rịa, Phú Mỹ and Châu Đức district), Xuyên Mộc.
- From that, the communes of Bông Trang, Bưng Riềng and Xuyên Mộc were under Xuyên Mộc district, Bà Rịa–Vũng Tàu province.

On June 12, 2025, the 15th National Assembly issued Resolution No. 202/2025/QH15 on the reorganization of provincial-level administrative units. Accordingly, the entire natural area and population of Ho Chi Minh City and the provinces of Bình Dưong and Bà Rịa–Vũng Tàu will be combined into a new administrative unit called Ho Chi Minh City.

On June 16, 2025, the National Assembly Standing Committee issued Resolution No. 1685/NQ-UBTVQH15 on the arrangement of commune-level administrative units of Ho Chi Minh City in 2025 (effective from June 16, 2025). Accordingly, the entire land area and population of Xuyên Mộc, Bông Trang and Bưng Riềng communes of the former Xuyên Mộc district will be integrated into a new commune named Xuyên Mộc (Clause 160, Article 1).

== Tourist attraction ==
Xuyên Mộc commune is known for its beach, called as Hồ Cốc in the former Bưng Riềng commune, the beach is next to the famous Hồ Tràm beach and these two names always go together when it comes to luxury resort areas of former Bà Rịa–Vũng Tàu province or the current Ho Chi Minh City.

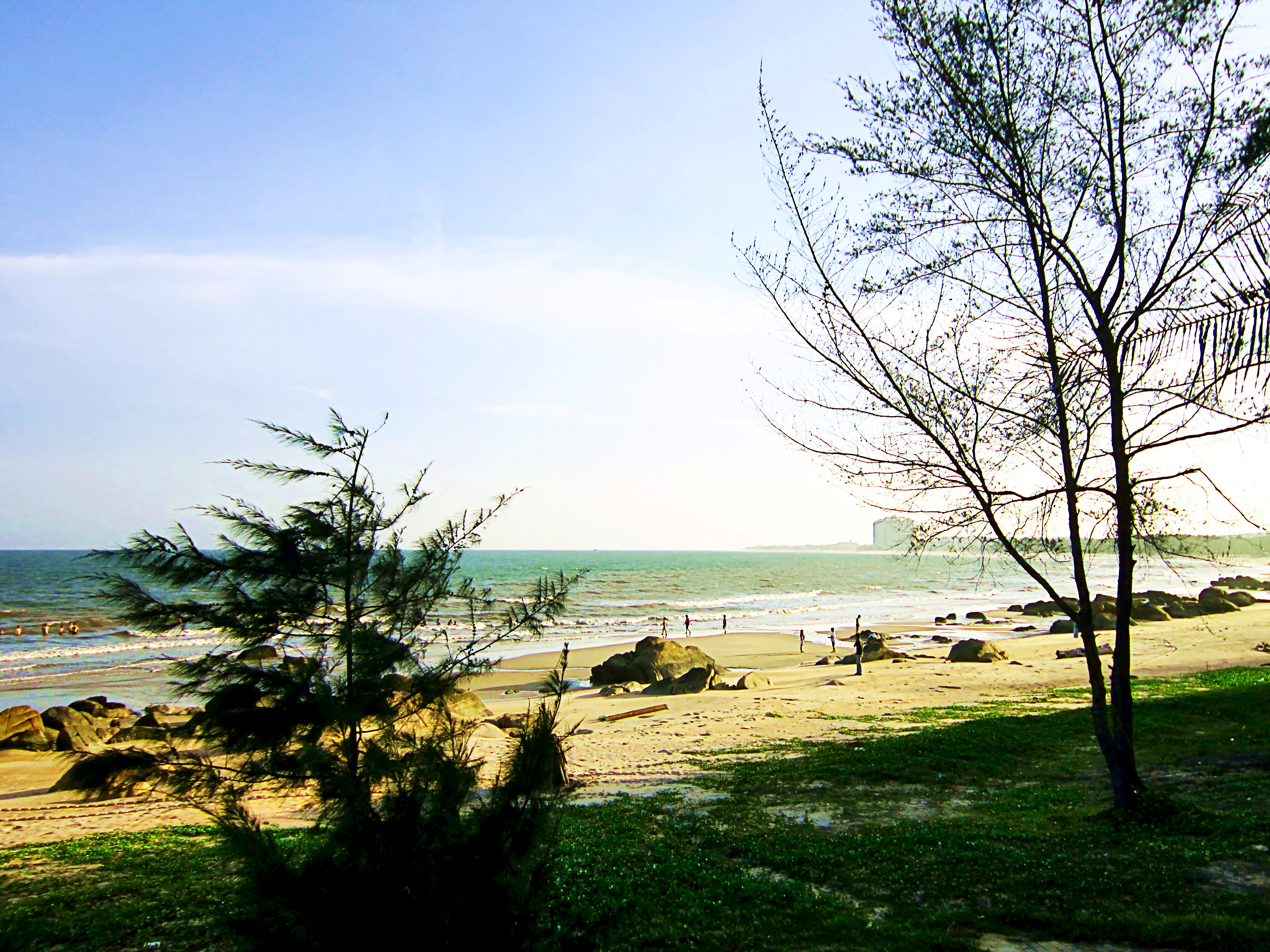
The Casuarina on Hồ Cóc Beach

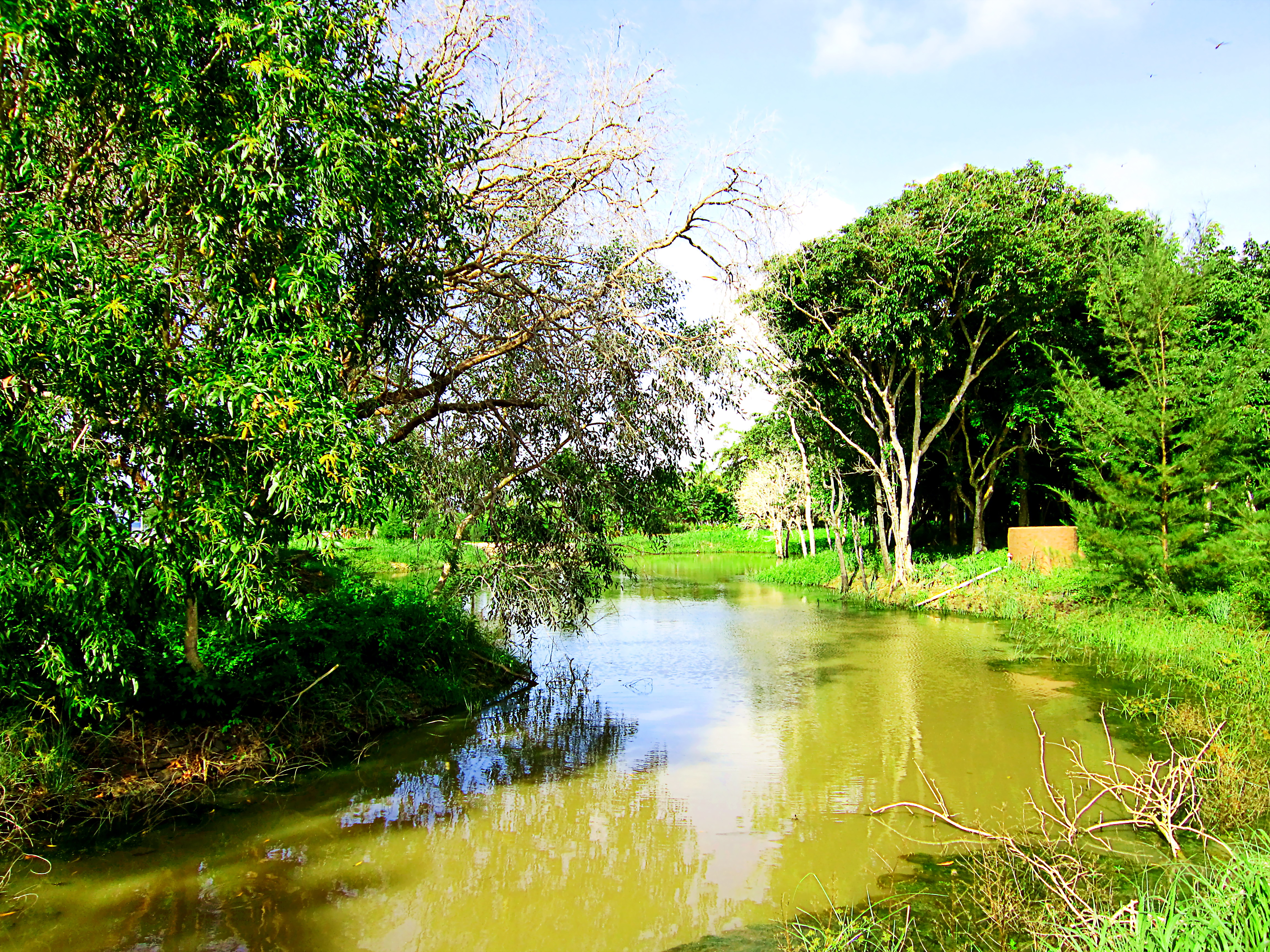
Scene of a resort in Hồ Cốc

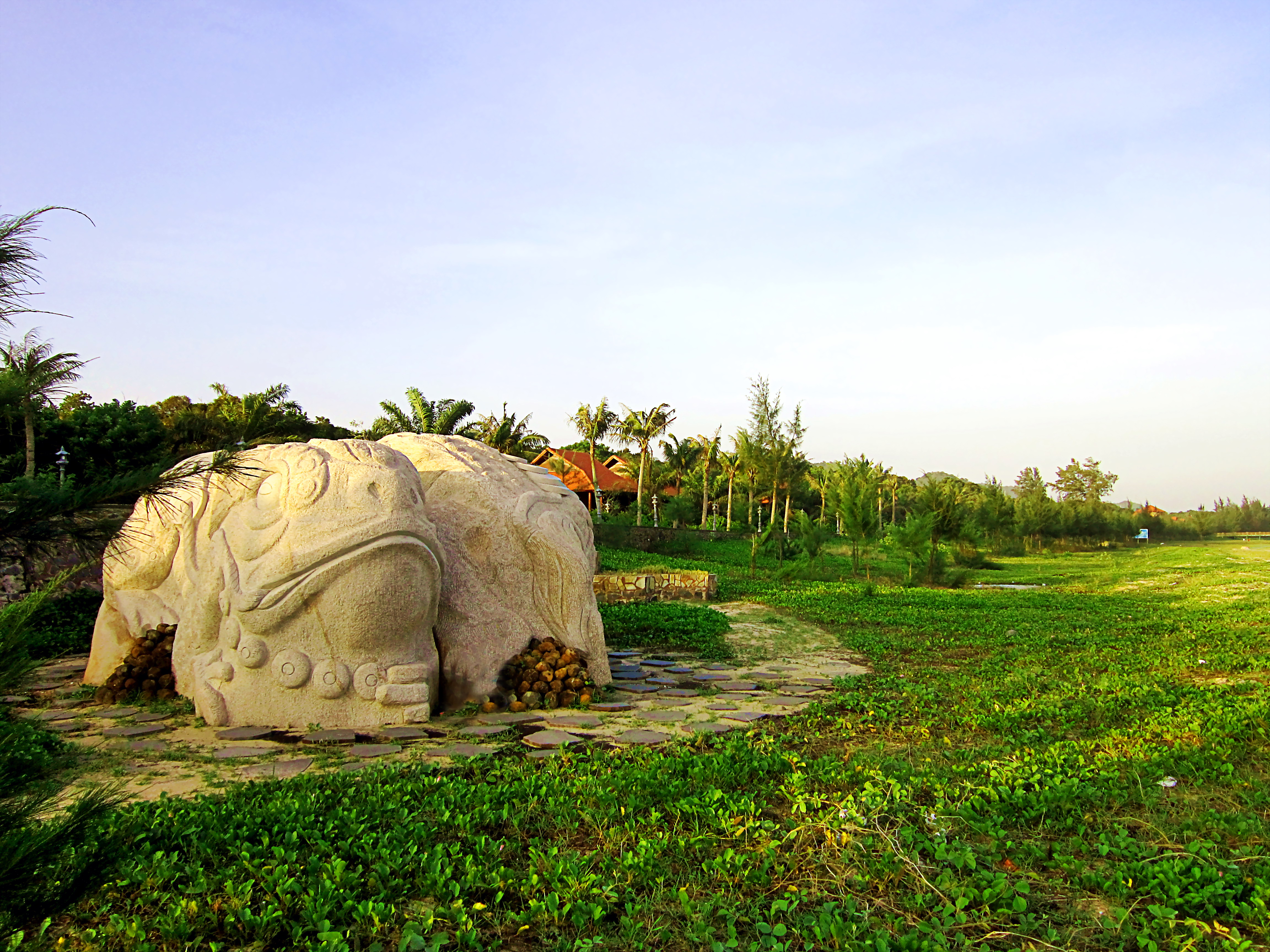
Toad statue in a resort in Hồ Cốc

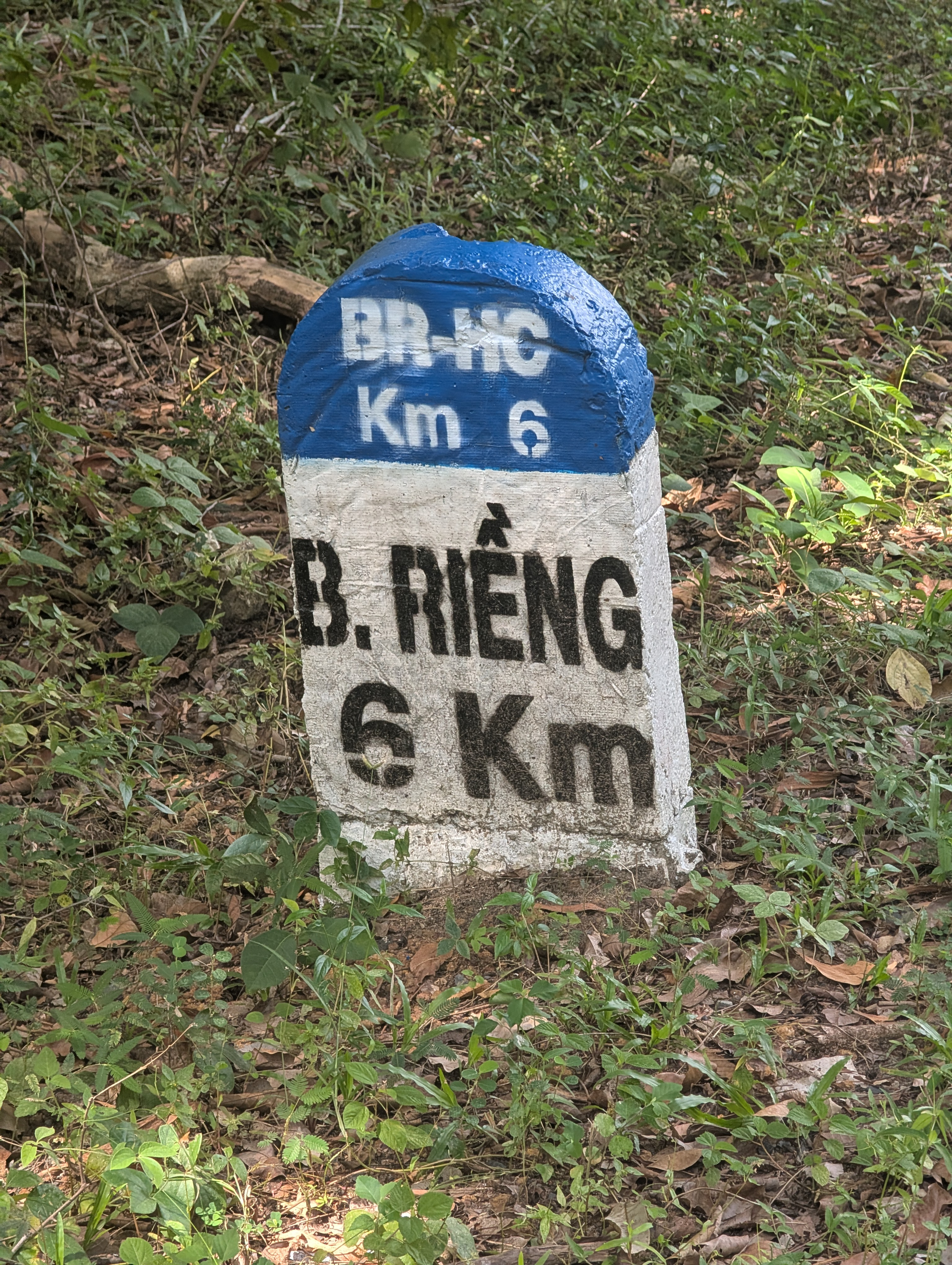
A Kilometer post in Bình Châu–Phước Bửu Nature Reserve shows that it is 6 Km away from Bưng Riềng (Hồ Cốc)

Beside beach, Xuyên Mộc also located at the centre of the Bình Châu–Phước Bửu Nature Reserve

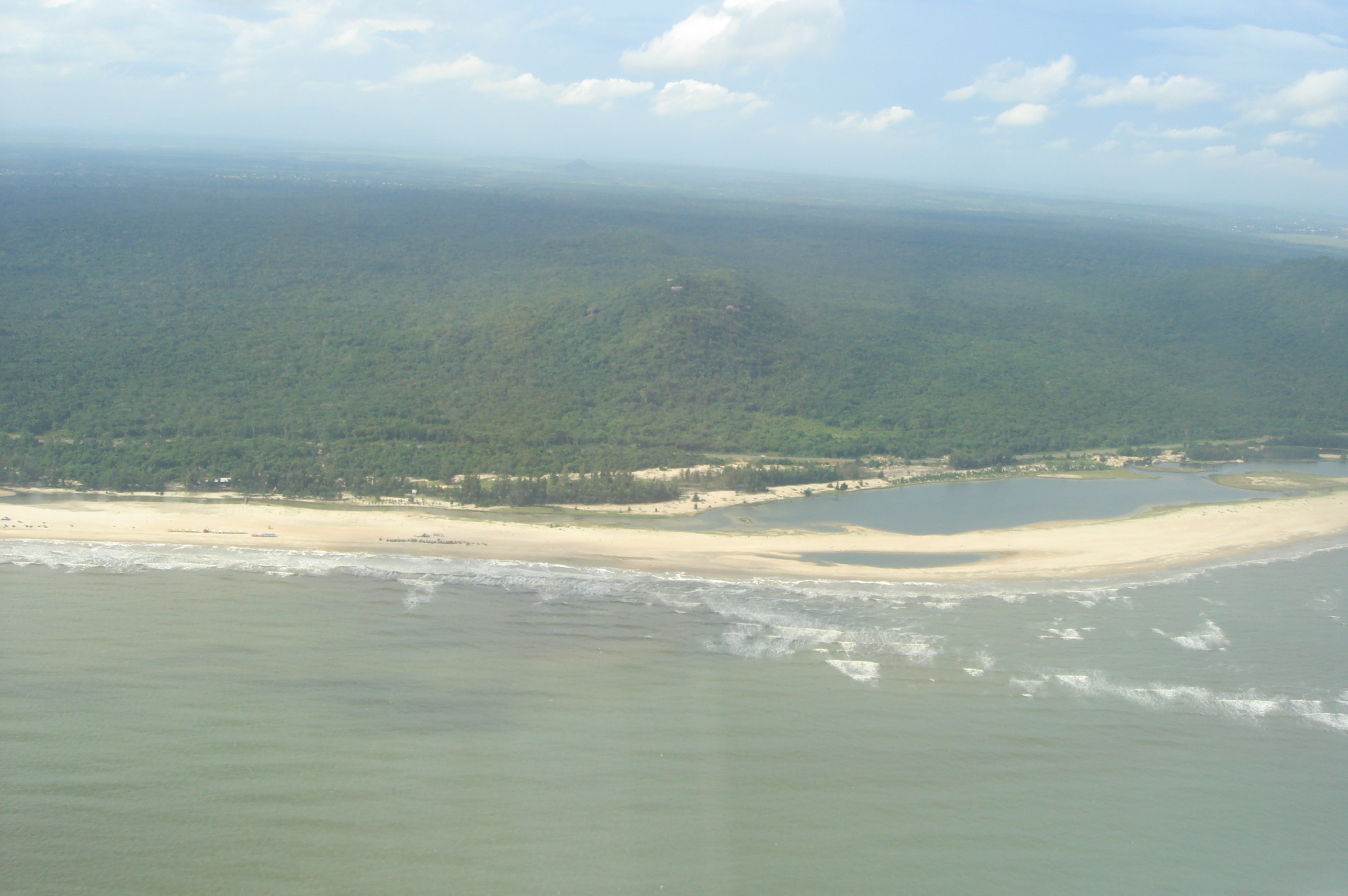
Aerial view of Hồ Cốc Beach with Bình Châu–Phước Bửu Nature Reserve

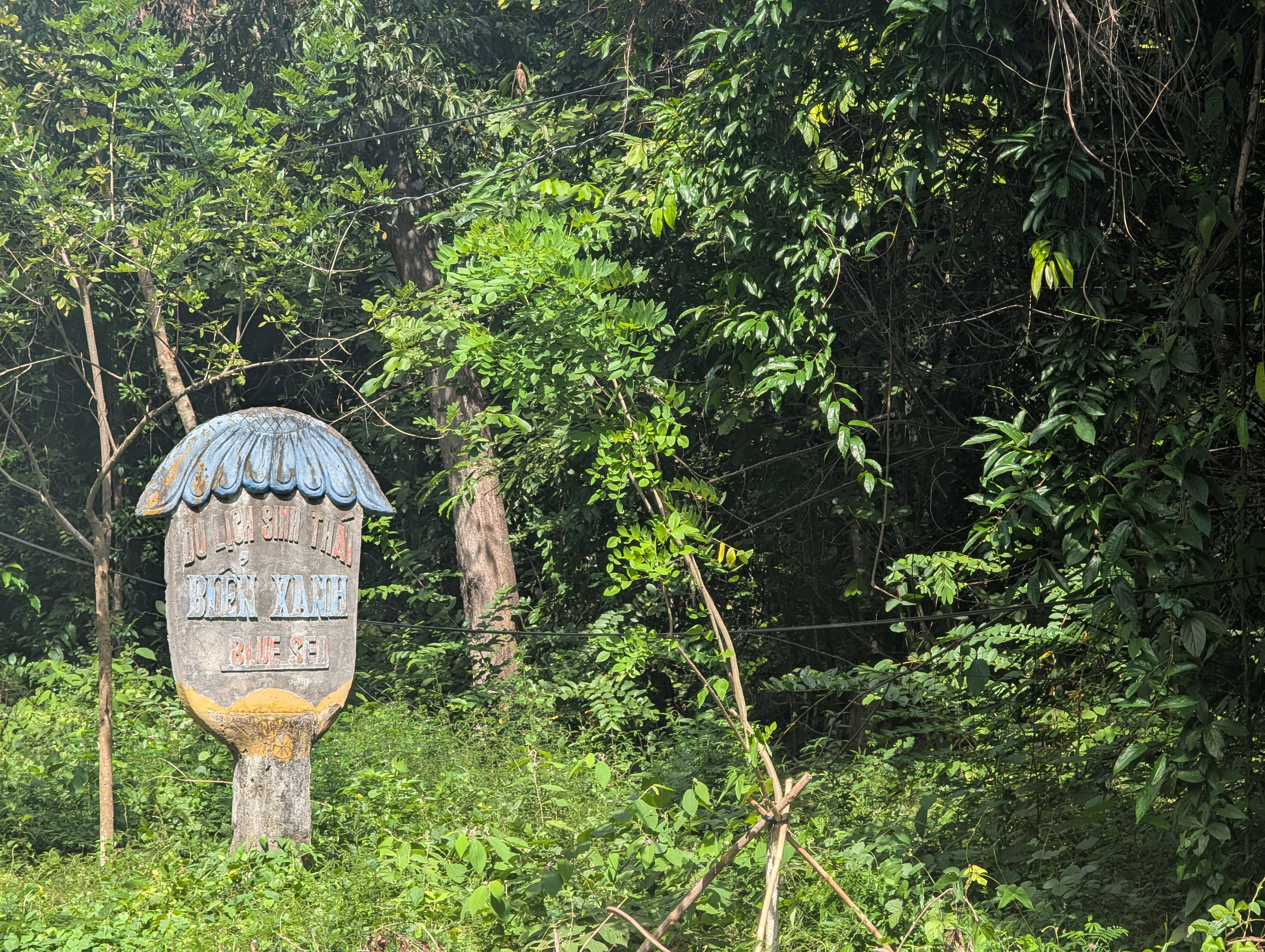
An ecotourism area sign

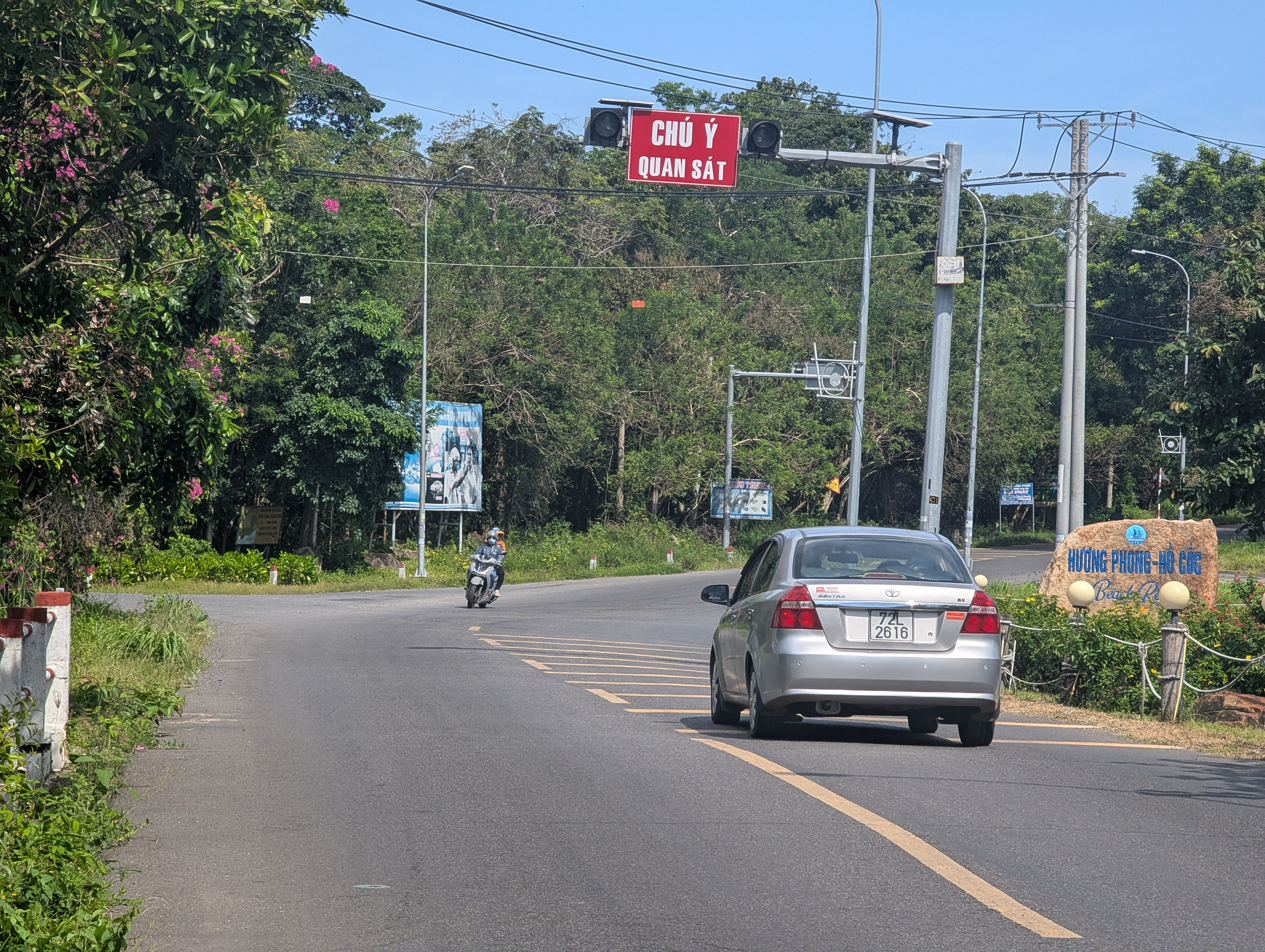
T-junction of Provincial Road 994 (Vũng Tàu – Hồ Tràm – Bình Châu Coastal Road) with Provincial Road 999B run through the forest
