= Xuyên Mộc district =

Coordinates: 10.633°N 107.417°E

Xuyên Mộc district Huyện Xuyên Mộc
- District
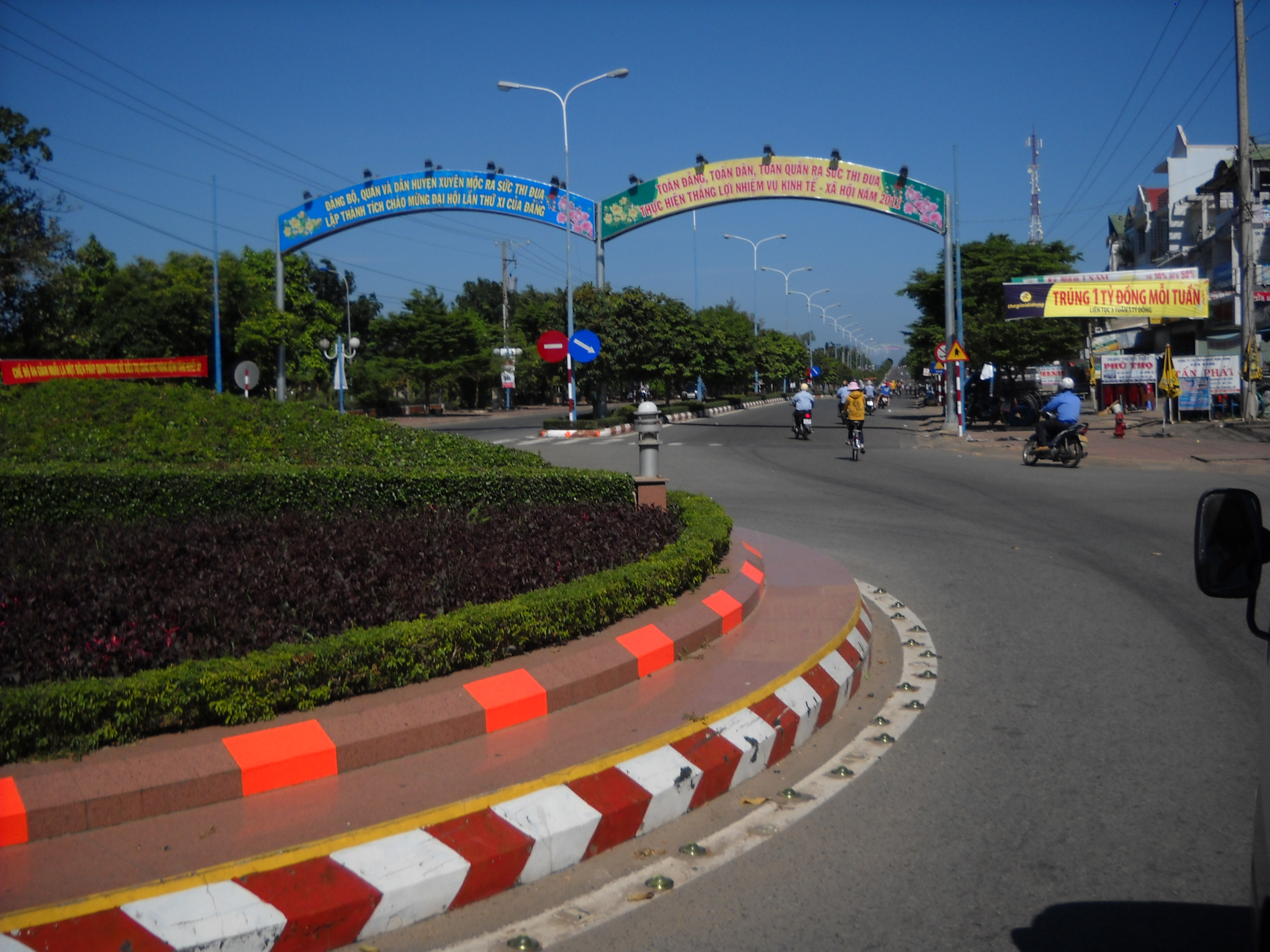
- Streets of Xuyên Mộc
- Interactive map of Xuyên Mộc district
- Country: Vietnam
- Region: South East
- Province: Bà Rịa–Vũng Tàu
- Capital: Phước Bửu

Area
  - District: 248 sq mi (642 km^{2})

Population (2019 census)
  - District: 140,723
  - Density: 568/sq mi (219/km^{2})
  - Urban: 16,315
  - Rural: 124,408
- Time zone: UTC+7 (Indochina Time)

Xuyên Mộc is a former rural district of Bà Rịa–Vũng Tàu province in the Southeast region of Vietnam. As of 2019, the district had a population of 140,723. The district covers an area of 642 km^{2} (248 sq mi).

== Overview ==
This city is home to primitive forest in which there exists a significant elephant population. Xuyên Mộc is noted for its hot spring in Bình Châu - Phước Bửu nature reserve which is available to tourists. Xuyên Mộc is located by the South China Sea and is known for its white sand, beaches and seafood.

Beaches in the area include Hồ Tràm Beach, which is starting to see numerous new high end developments come up, including The Grand Hồ Tràm Strip (formerly known as MGM Hồ Tràm Casino & Resort), Melia Ho Tram Beach Resort and several additional private developments along the main Hồ Tràm Beach. Hồ Cốc beach is also nearby is a common weekend destination for Ho Chi Minh City residents.

== Administrative divisions ==
The district is divided into one township, the capital of Phước Bửu, and 12 communes: Phước Thuận, Phước Tân, Xuyên Mộc, Bông Trang, Bàu Lâm, Hòa Bình, Hòa Hưng, Hòa Hiệp, Hòa Hội, Bưng Riềng, Tân Lâm and Bình Châu.
