= Phước Tân (disambiguation) =

Phước Tân may refer to several places in Vietnam, including:

- Phước Tân, Đồng Nai, a ward of Đồng Nai
- Phước Tân, Khánh Hòa, a former ward of Nha Trang
- Phước Tân, Ninh Thuận, a former commune of Bác Ái District
- Phước Tân, Bình Phước, a former commune of Phú Riềng District
- Phước Tân, Phú Yên, a former commune of Sơn Hòa District
- Phước Tân, Bà Rịa-Vũng Tàu, a former commune of Xuyên Mộc District
