= Bàu Lâm =

Bàu Lâm Xã Bàu Lâm
- Commune
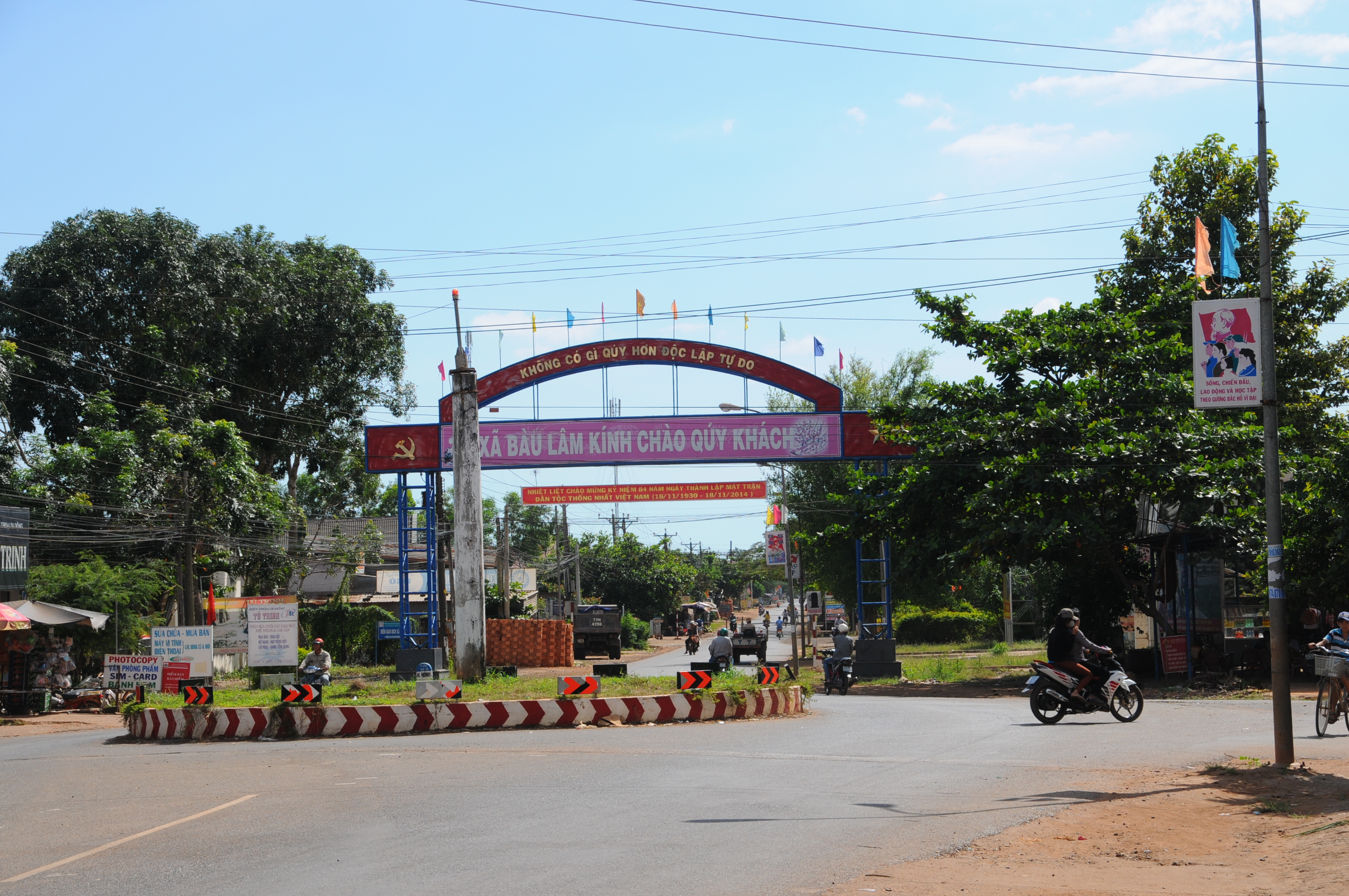
- Interactive map of Bàu Lâm
- Coordinates: 10°41′51″N 107°24′09″E
- Country: Vietnam
- Municipality: Ho Chi Minh City
- Established: June 16, 2025

Area
  - Total: 47.81 sq mi (123.83 km^{2})

Population (2024)
  - Total: 22,567
  - Density: 472.00/sq mi (182.24/km^{2})
- Time zone: UTC+07:00 (Indochina Time)
- Administrative code: 26638

Bàu Lâm (Vietnamese: Xã Bàu Lâm) is a commune of Ho Chi Minh City, Vietnam. It is one of the 168 new wards, communes and special zones of the city following the reorganization in 2025.

== Geography ==
Bàu Lâm is located in the East of Ho Chi Minh City, about 42km northeast of Bà Rịa and about 110km east of Saigon. It has the following geographical location:

- To the east, it borders Hòa Hiệp
- To the south, it borders Hòa Hội
- To the southwest, it borders Xuân Sơn
- To the west, it borders Sông Ray and Xuân Đông
- To the north, it borders Xuân Hòa

According to Official Dispatch No. 2896/BNV-CQĐP dated May 27, 2025 of the Ministry of Home Affairs, following the merger, Bàu Lâm has a land area of 123.83 km², the population as of December 31, 2024 is 22,567 people, the population density is 182 people/km².

== History ==
On June 16, 2025, the National Assembly Standing Committee issued Resolution No. 1685/NQ-UBTVQH15 on the arrangement of commune-level administrative units of Ho Chi Minh City in 2025 (effective from June 16, 2025). Accordingly, the entire land area and population of Tân Lâm and Bàu Lâm communes of the former Xuyên Mộc district will be integrated into a new commune named Bàu Lâm (Clause 162, Article 1).
