= Hòa Hiệp =

Hòa Hiệp may refer to:

- Commune Hòa Hiệp, Đắk Lắk, Cư Kuin District, Đắk Lắk Province
- Commune Hòa Hiệp, Tây Ninh, Tân Biên District, Tây Ninh Province
- Commune Hòa Hiệp, Bà Rịa–Vũng Tàu, Xuyên Mộc District, Bà Rịa–Vũng Tàu Province.
