= Hòa Hội =

Hòa Hội may refer to several places in Vietnam, including:

- Hòa Hội, Bà Rịa-Vũng Tàu, a rural commune of Xuyên Mộc District
- Hòa Hội, Phú Yên, a rural commune of Phú Hòa District
- Hòa Hội, Tây Ninh, a rural commune of Châu Thành District
