= Hòa Hưng =

Hòa Hưng may refer to several places in Vietnam:

Current

- Hòa Hưng, a ward in Ho Chi Minh City
- Hòa Hưng, a commune in An Giang Province

Former

- Hòa Hưng, a former commune and village in Xuyên Mộc District, Bà Rịa–Vũng Tàu Province
- Hòa Hưng, a former commune and village in Cái Bè District, Tiền Giang Province
