= Hồ Cốc =

Coordinates: 10.49964°N 107.47866°E

Hồ Cốc Bãi biển Hồ Cốc Hồ Cốc Beach
- Settlement
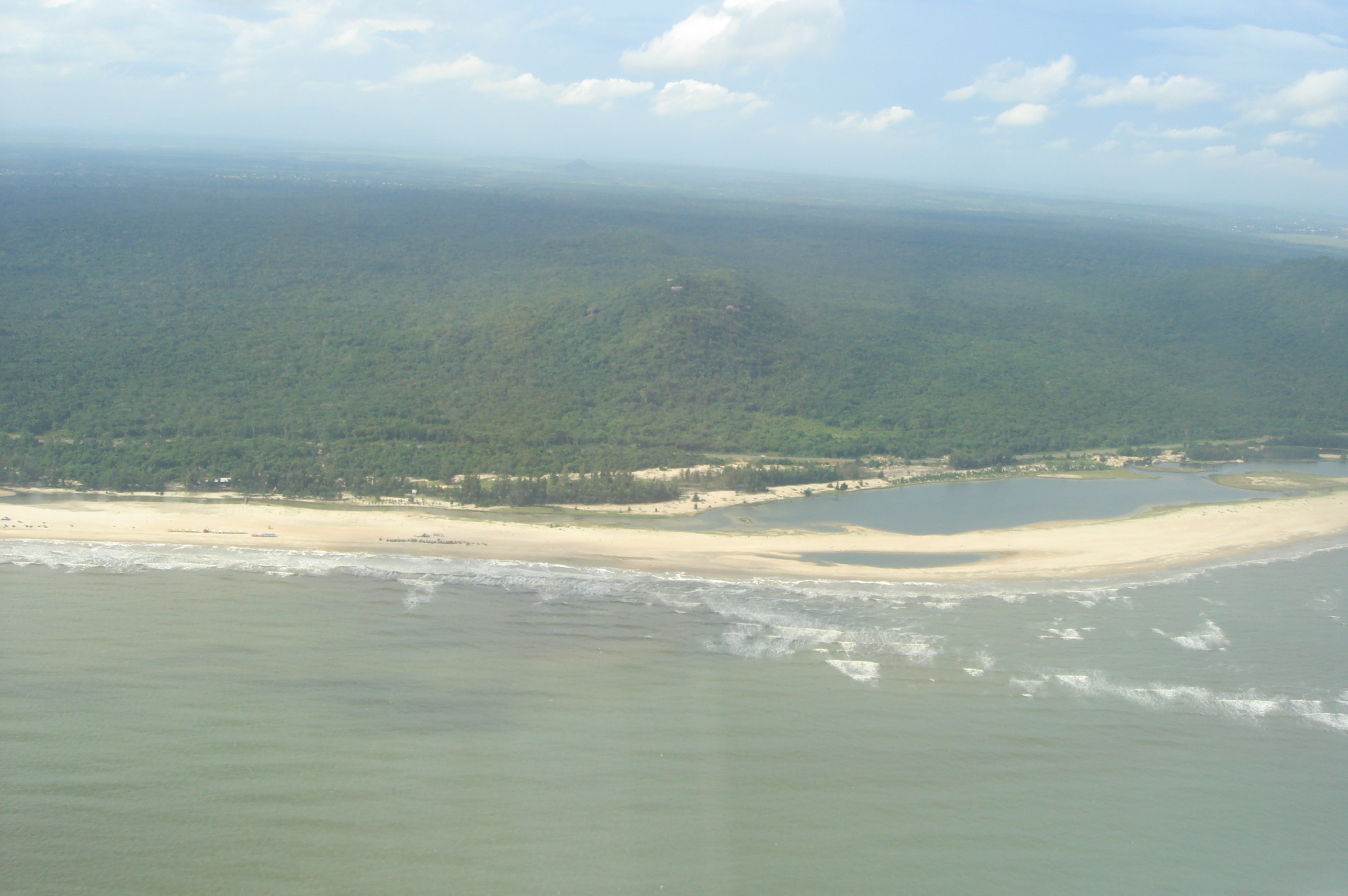
- Aerial view of Hồ Cốc Beach with Bình Châu–Phước Bửu Nature Reserve
- Interactive map of Hồ Cốc
- Country: Vietnam
- Region: Southeast
- Municipality: Ho Chi Minh City
- Province: Bà Rịa–Vũng Tàu (before July 2025)
- District: Xuyên Mộc (before July 2025)
- Time zone: UTC+7 (UTC + 7)

Hồ Cốc is a small beach community located in Vietnam's Ho Chi Minh City, in Xuyên Mộc commune (former Bưng Riềng commune, Xuyên Mộc District, Bà Rịa–Vũng Tàu province).

== Location and transportation ==
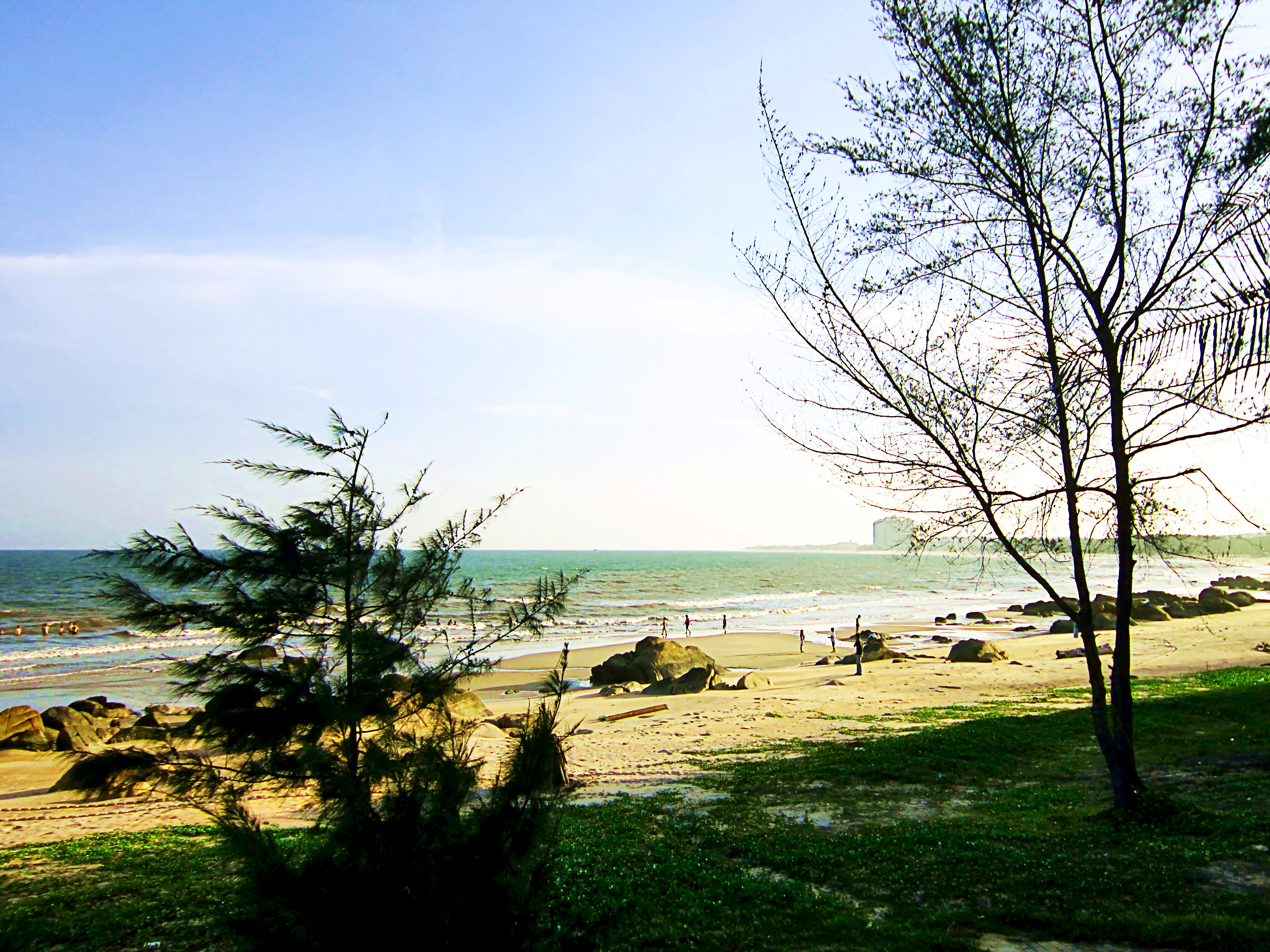
Hồ Cốc Beach

It is situated about 125 kilometres (78 miles) southeast of Saigon, Ho Chi Minh City (HCMC) and 60 kilometres (37 miles) to northeast of Vũng Tàu. The trip to Hồ Cốc takes only about 2 hours from HCMC by car or 90 minutes via the ferry from HCMC to Vũng Tàu.

The most popular route to access is to follow the National Route 51, through Bà Rịa, then turn onto National Highway 55 and follow the coastal road of Bình Châu – Hồ Cốc. The estimated travel time by car or private motorbike takes about 2.5 hours.

== Accommodation ==
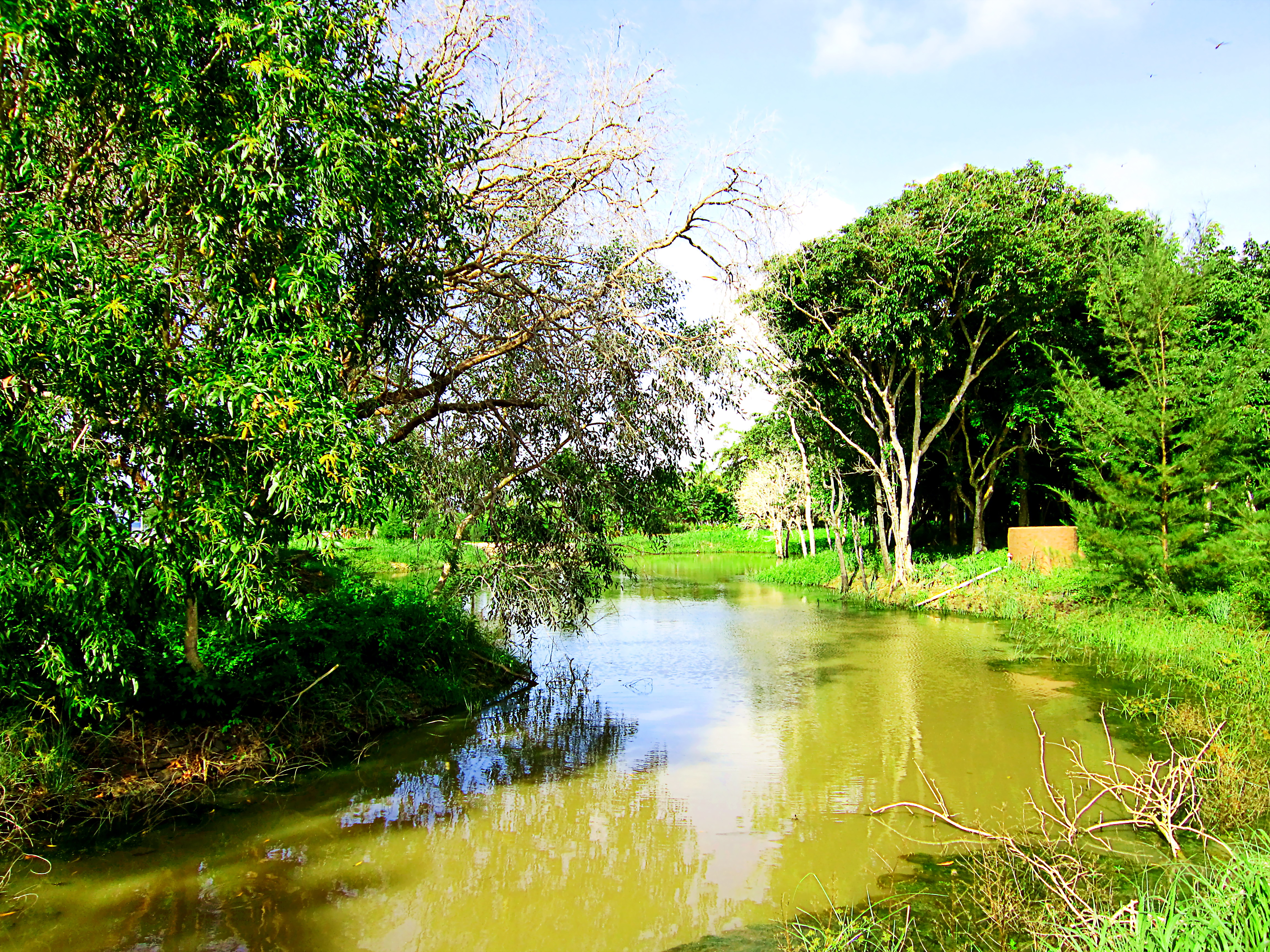
Scene of a resort in Hồ Cốc

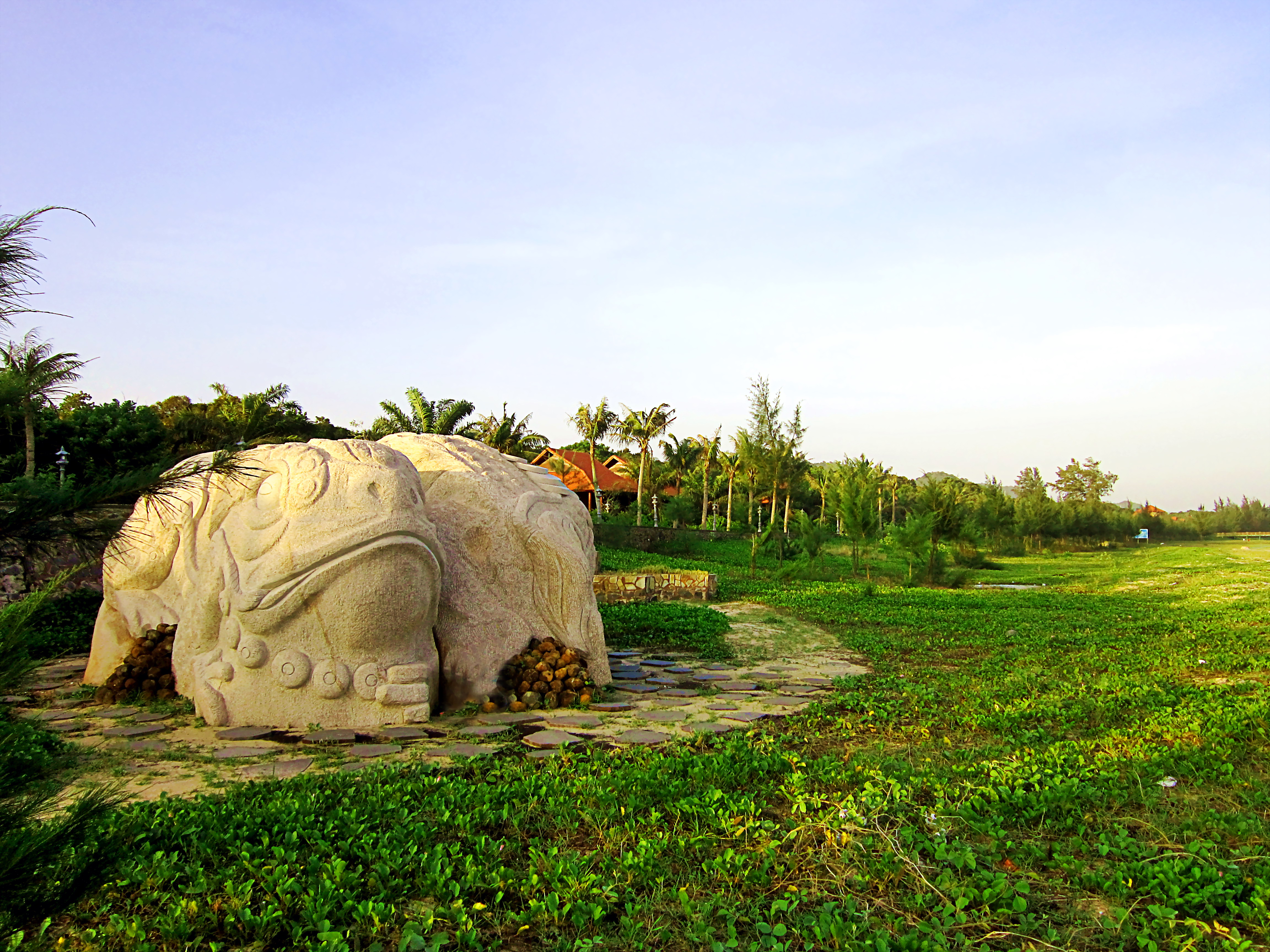
Toad statue in a resort in Hồ Cốc

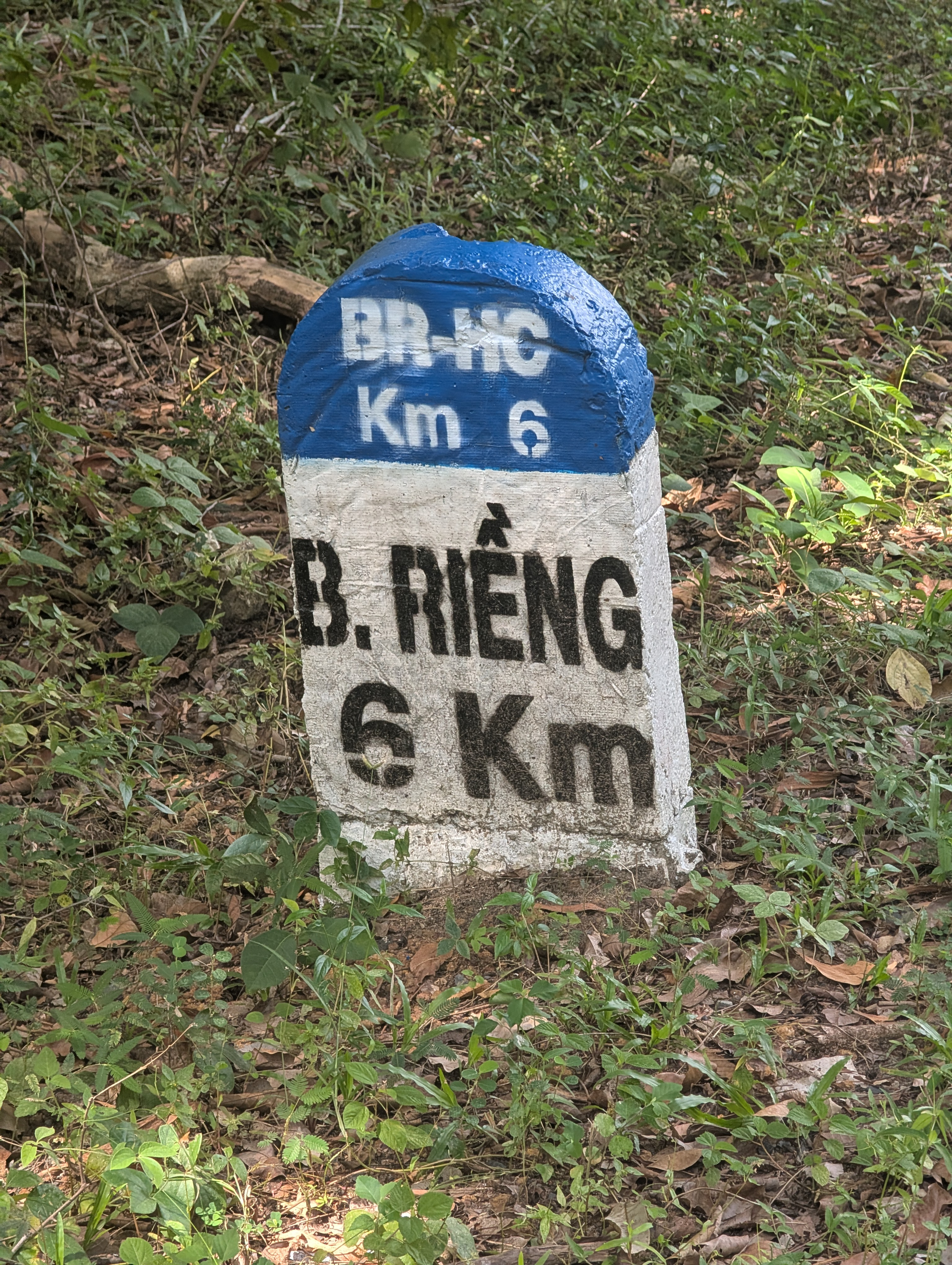
A Kilometer post in Bình Châu–Phước Bửu Nature Reserve shows that it is 6 Km away from Bưng Riềng (Hồ Cốc)

Hồ Cốc is expected to follow the development of Hồ Tràm beach as well as the ACDL MGM Hồ Tràm casino project located nearby and become a major resort destination in southern Vietnam. Also notable in the area are hot springs and an 11,000 ha (27,000 acres) rain forest that was designated as a nature reserve in 1975.
