= Hồ Tràm =

Hồ Tràm Xã Hồ Tràm Phước Bửu
- Commune
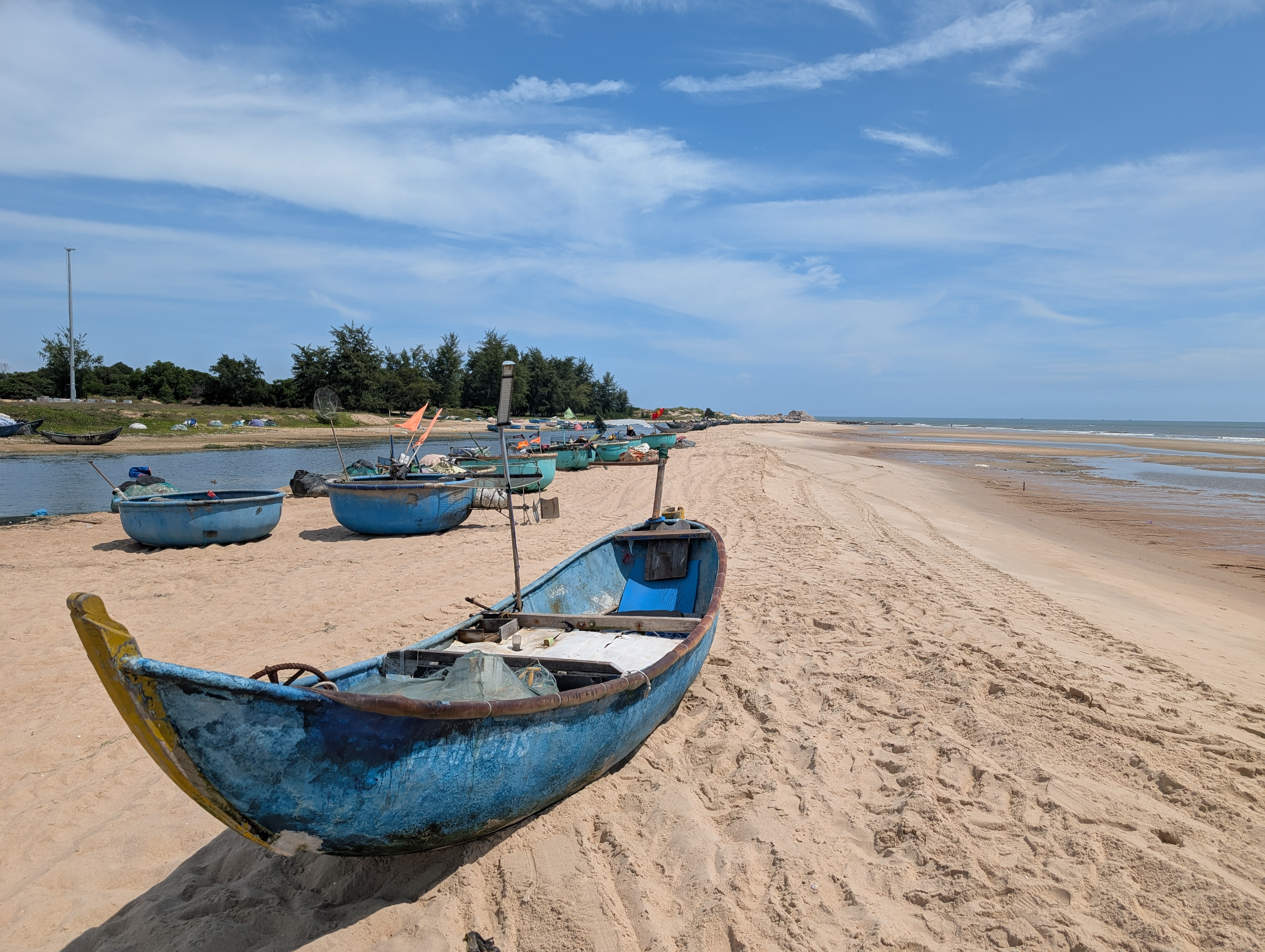
- Traditional Vietnamese fishing boats on Ho Tram Beach
- Interactive map of Hồ Tràm
- Coordinates: 10°29′00″N 107°26′00″E
- Country: Vietnam
- Municipality: Ho Chi Minh City
- Established: June 16, 2025

Area
  - Total: 36.49 sq mi (94.51 km^{2})

Population (2024)
  - Total: 51,895
  - Density: 1,422/sq mi (549.1/km^{2})
- Time zone: UTC+07:00 (Indochina Time)
- Administrative code: 26620

Hồ Tràm (Vietnamese: Xã Hồ Tràm) is a commune of Ho Chi Minh City, Vietnam. It is one of the 168 new wards, communes and special zones of the city following the reorganization in 2025.

== Geography ==
Hồ Tràm is a coastal commune at southeastern of Ho Chi Minh City, 30 km to the east of Bà Rịa, 40 km to the northeast of Vũng Tàu and 100 km to the southeast of Saigon, it is part of the former Xuyên Mộc district, Bà Rịa–Vũng Tàu province. It borders with:

- Xuyên Mộc to the east
- Phước Hải and Đất Đỏ to the west by Ray River
- Xuân Sơn to the northwest by Ray River
- Hòa Hội to the north
- South China Sea to the south

According to Official Dispatch No. 2896/BNV-CQĐP dated May 27, 2025 of the Ministry of Home Affairs, following the merger, Hồ Tràm has a land area of 94.51 km^{2}, the population as of December 31, 2024 is 51,895 people, the population density is 549 people/km^{2}.

== Etymology ==
The name Hồ Tràm originates from the presence of melaleuca trees (Vietnamese: Cây Tràm), which once served as a shield protecting the surrounding fishing villages from the onslaught of waves and wind, combined with the fact that the area has many lakes.

The name Hồ Tràm refers not only to the small hamlet of the former Phước Thuận commune, Xuyên Mộc district in Bà Rịa–Vũng Tàu province or a commune of Ho Chi Minh City currently, but also once previously referred to a seaside strip from Long Hải town to Bình Châu.

== History ==
On February 24, 1976, the Provisional Revolutionary Government of the Republic of South Vietnam issued a Decree on the dissolution of districts and the merger of provinces in South Vietnam. Accordingly, Đồng Nai province was established based on the natural area and population size of Phước Tuy, Biên Hoà, and Long Khánh provinces. At that time, Phước Bửu commune belonged to Xuyên Mộc district, Đồng Nai Province. Simultaneously, the commune was also the district capital. Hồ Tràm then was just a village of Phước Bửu.

On January 17, 1984, the Council of Ministers issued Decision 12-HĐBT on the demarcation of boundaries of some communes, towns, and wards in Đồng Nai province. Accordingly:

- Established Phước Tân commune based on the natural area and population size of the hamlets of Thạnh Sơn 4, Thạnh Sơn 3, Việt Kiều, Bà Rịa, Tân Phú and part of Gò Cát of Phước Bửu.
- After the adjustments, Phước Bửu commune retains the natural area and population size of the hamlets of Xóm Rẫy, Gò Cà, Thanh Sơn 1A, Thanh Sơn 1B, Xim, and part of Gò Cát.
- At that time, Phước Bửu commune was the district capital of the Xuyên Mộc district, Đồng Nai province.

On August 12, 1991, the National Assembly issued a Resolution on the adjustment of administrative boundaries of some provinces and centrally-administered cities. Accordingly:

- The province of Bà Rịa–Vũng Tàu province was established based on the natural area and population size of:
  1. Đặc khu Vũng Tàu - Côn Đảo Special Zone
  2. 3 districts of Đồng Nai province: Long Đất, Châu Thành (later split into Châu Đức and Tân Thành), and Xuyên Mộc.
  3. Phước Bửu commune is the capital of Xuyên Mộc district, Bà Rịa - Vũng Tàu province.
- From that, communes of Phước Tân and Phước Bửu is under Xuyên Mộc district, Bà Rịa–Vũng Tàu province.

On October 30, 1995, the Government issued Decree 71-CP on the establishment of the district town of Xuyen Moc district, Lộc An commune of Long Đất district, Bà Rịa–Vũng Tàu province. Accordingly:

- The town (thị trấn) of Phước Bửu was established by adjusting 800 hectares of natural area and a population of 7,649 people from Phước Bửu commune.
- After the adjustment, Phước Bửu commune retained 5,202 hectares of natural area and a population of 8,041 people and was renamed Phước Thuận commune. Hồ Tràm village was part of Phước Thuận commune.
- The Phước Bửu town became the district capital of Xuyên Mộc district in Bà Rịa - Vũng Tàu province.

On June 16, 2025, the National Assembly Standing Committee issued Resolution No. 1685/NQ-UBTVQH15 on the arrangement of commune-level administrative units of Ho Chi Minh City in 2025 (effective from June 16, 2025). Accordingly, the entire land area and population of Phước Bửu township and Phước Tân, Phước Thuận communes of the former Xuyên Mộc district will be integrated into a new commune named Hồ Tràm (Clause 159, Article 1).

== Administration ==
=== Division ===
Hồ Tràm is divided into 23 hamlets (ấp): Bà Rịa, Bà Tô, Cây Điệp, Gò Cà, Gò Cát, Hồ Tràm, Láng Sim, Ông Tô, Phước An, Phước Bửu, Phước Hòa, Phước Lộc, Phước Tân, Phước Tiến, Phước Thuận, Tân An, Tân Phước, Tân Rú, Tân Trung, Thạnh Sơn, Việt Kiều, Xóm Rẫy, Xuyên Phước Cơ.

Previously, there are 7 of 23 hamlets were quarters (Khu phố) of Phước Bửu town (thị trấn), the rest are hamlets of both Phước Tân and Phước Thuận communes. Notably, Hồ Tràm commune had previously restructured 23 hamlets (ấp) into villages (thôn) after mergers, but has since converted them back into hamlets according to Resolution No. 19/NQ-HĐND dated July 29, 2025, of the People's Council of the commune.

Comparison table of hamlet/village names in Hồ Trầm commune, before and after merger and renaming (in Vietnamese)
Hamlet/quarter names before merger	Village names	Current hamlets
Khu phố Láng Sim (thị trấn Phước Bửu)	Thôn Láng Sim	Ấp Láng Sim
Khu phố Phước Hòa (thị trấn Phước Bửu)	Thôn Phước Hòa	Ấp Phước Hòa
Khu phố Phước Lộc (thị trấn Phước Bửu)	Thôn Phước Lộc	Ấp Phước Lộc
Khu phố Xóm Rẫy (thị trấn Phước Bửu)	Thôn Phước Bửu	Ấp Phước Bửu
Khu phố Phước An (thị trấn Phước Bửu)	Thôn Phước An	Ấp Phước An
Khu phố Thạnh Sơn (thị trấn Phước Bửu)	Thôn Thạnh Sơn	Ấp Thạnh Sơn
Khu phố Phước Tiến (thị trấn Phước Bửu)	Thôn Phước Tiến	Ấp Phước Tiến
Ấp Hồ Tràm (xã Phước Thuận)	Thôn Hồ Tràm	Ấp Hồ Tràm
Ấp Gò Cà (xã Phước Thuận)	Thôn Gò Cà	Ấp Gò Cà
Ấp Xóm Rẫy (xã Phước Thuận)	Thôn Xóm Rẫy	Ấp Xóm Rẫy
Ấp Thạnh Sơn 1A (xã Phước Thuận)	Thôn Thạnh Sơn 1A	Ấp Xuyên Phước Cơ
Ấp Thạnh Sơn 2A (xã Phước Thuận)	Thôn Phước Thuận	Ấp Phước Thuận
Ấp Gò Cát (xã Phước Thuận)	Thôn Gò Cát	Ấp Gò Cát
Ấp Ông Tô (xã Phước Thuận)	Thôn Ông Tô	Ấp Ông Tô
Ấp Tân An (xã Phước Tân)	Thôn Tân An	Ấp Tân An
Ấp Tân Rú (xã Phước Tân)	Thôn Tân Rú	Ấp Tân Rú
Ấp Thạnh Sơn 4 (xã Phước Tân)	Thôn Thạnh Sơn 4	Ấp Tân Phước
Ấp Thạnh Sơn 3 (xã Phước Tân)	Thôn Thạnh Sơn 3	Ấp Cây Điệp
Ấp Bà Rịa (xã Phước Tân)	Thôn Bà Rịa	Ấp Bà Rịa
Ấp Thạnh Sơn 2B (xã Phước Tân)	Thôn Thạnh Sơn 2B	Ấp Phước Tân
Ấp Việt Kiều (xã Phước Tân)	Thôn Việt Kiều	Ấp Việt Kiều
Ấp Tân Trung (xã Phước Tân)	Thôn Tân Trung	Ấp Tân Trung
Ấp Thạnh Sơn 2A (xã Phước Tân)	Thôn Thạnh Sơn 2A	Ấp Bà Tô

=== Headquarters of several agencies in Ho Tram commune ===
Headquarters of several agencies administrate the Hồ Tràm commune:

- Headquarters of the People's Council and People's Committee: 151 National Route 55 (Former People's Committee Head Office of Xuyên Mộc District)
- Public Administration Service Center: 147 National Route 55 (Former One-Stop Service Center of Xuyên Mộc District)
- Police Headquarters: 284 National Route 55 (Former Xuyên Mộc District Police)
- Commune Party Committee Headquarters: 153 National Route 55 (Former Party Committee of Xuyên Mộc District )
- Headquarters of the Vietnam Fatherland Front: 160 Bình Giã Road (Former Xuyên Mộc District Organizing Committee)
- Military Command: 01 Phạm Văn Đồng Street (Former Military Command of Phước Bửu town)

Other agencies in Hồ Tràm commune:

- Regional Prosecutor's Office 14 - Ho Chi Minh City (Branch 2): 266 National Route 55 (Former Xuyên Mộc District Prosecutor's Office)

== Transportation ==
=== Roads ===
An expressway connecting Long Thanh International Airport with Hồ Tràm, Long Thành – Hồ Tràm Expressway, is started to build in July 2026 to marked 50 years of Saigon – Gia Định City renamed to Ho Chi Minh City.

The Provincial Road 994 is a coastal road that runs from Cửa Lấp Bridge in former city of Vũng Tàu to Bình Châu, also known as Vũng Tàu – Bình Châu coastal road, with a length around 40 km. The National Route 55, started in the west at Bà Rịa Roundabout, intersect with National Route 51.

== Tourism ==
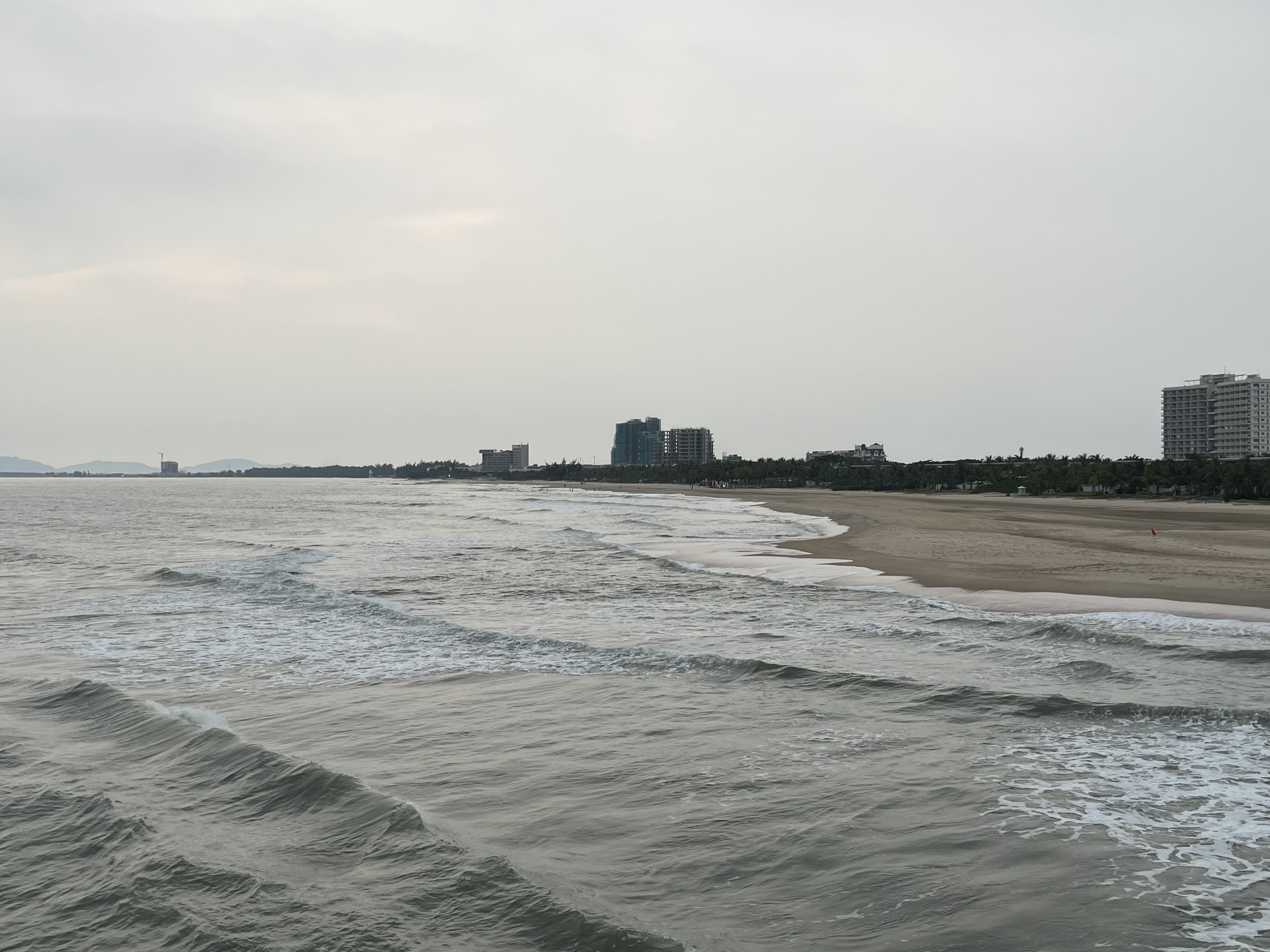
Hồ Tràm Beach skyline

Ho Tram's beachfront is located 2 hours from Ho Chi Minh City (HCMC) by car or 90 minutes via the ferry from Bạch Đằng Quay, HCMC to Vũng Tàu. For over a century, the Vung Tau cape (Cap St Jacques) has been known as a sea-side sanatorium for treatment of diseases with climate and sea water, and it became an early tourism city of Vietnam. Ho Tram is a resort destination in a developing region, along with its nearby "sister" beach destination Hồ Cốc. Ho Tram has a wide beach of clear sand and is a week-end destination for Ho Chi Minh City residents as well as a resort destination for international tourists. Ho Tram also provides local excursions to Binh Chau Hot Springs in Bình Châu, known for its mud baths and hot mineral springs said to improve blood circulation and mental disorders. The area is also home to an 11,000-hectare (42 sq mi) rainforest that was designated as a nature reserve in 1975. Most of the larger wildlife was exterminated or moved for safety reasons (most of the elephants were sent to Thailand), but birds and monkeys can be spotted in the forest.

Ho Tram Beach is mentioned by Lonely Planet Guide as the #3 of the Top 5 Places to visit around Ho Chi Minh City Lonely Planet Top 5 Around HCMC.

The current development plans in this temperate climate of southern Vietnam parallels the early growth of Phuket, Las Vegas and Macau into premier tourist destinations. The yearly average temperature is 28 °C (82 °F) which is more moderate than other South Vietnamese provinces, the annual rainfall is only 1,500 millimetres (59 in) which makes it one of the driest in the country. The temperature of the sea surface is about 25 °C (77 °F) all year round.

=== Accommodations ===
Some notable accommodations in Hồ Tràm:

Notes: The first three are in one complex known as The Grand Ho Tram or The Grand Ho Tram Strip, formerly the MGM Grand Ho Tram Strip

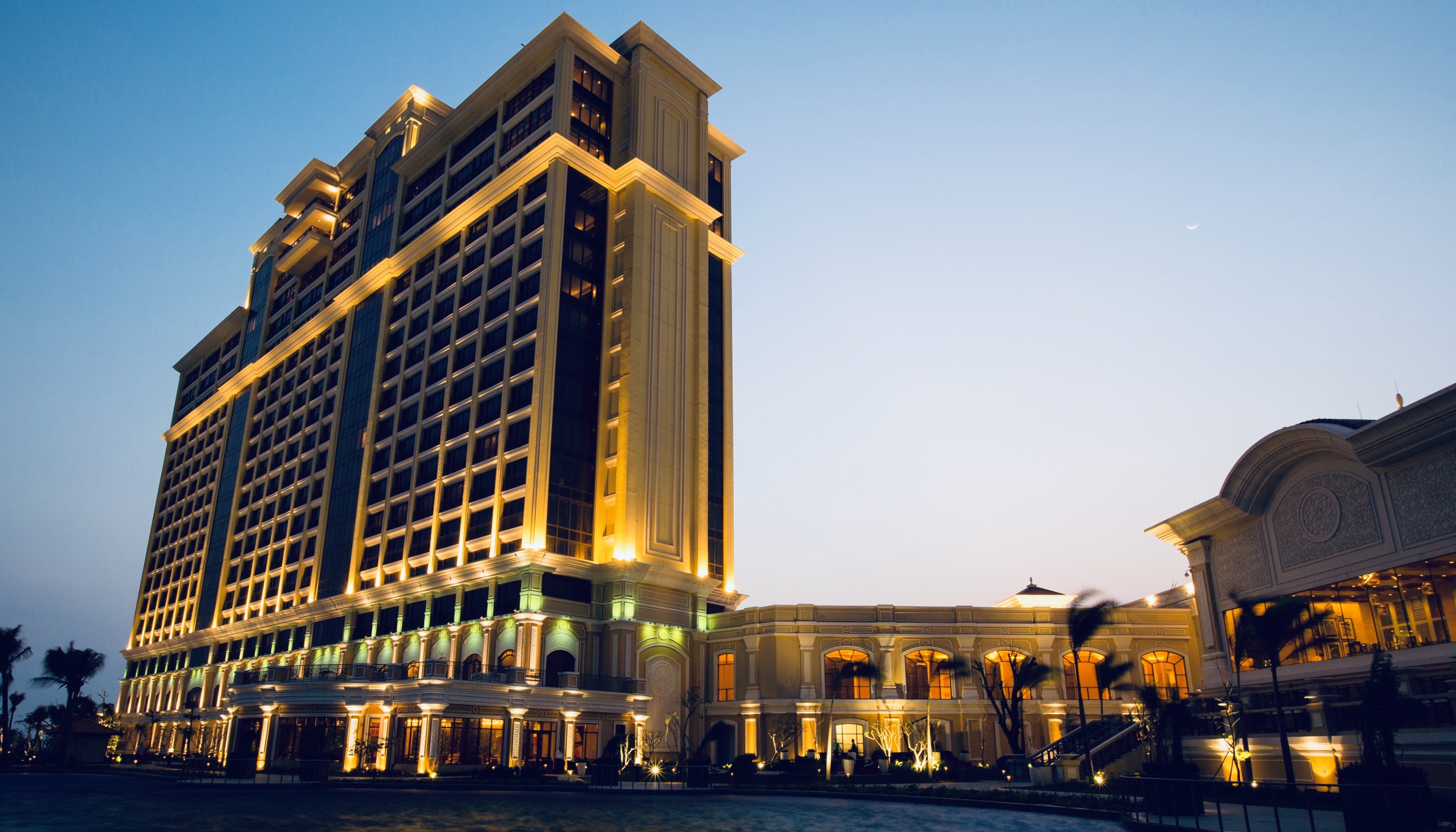
InterContinental Grand Ho Tram

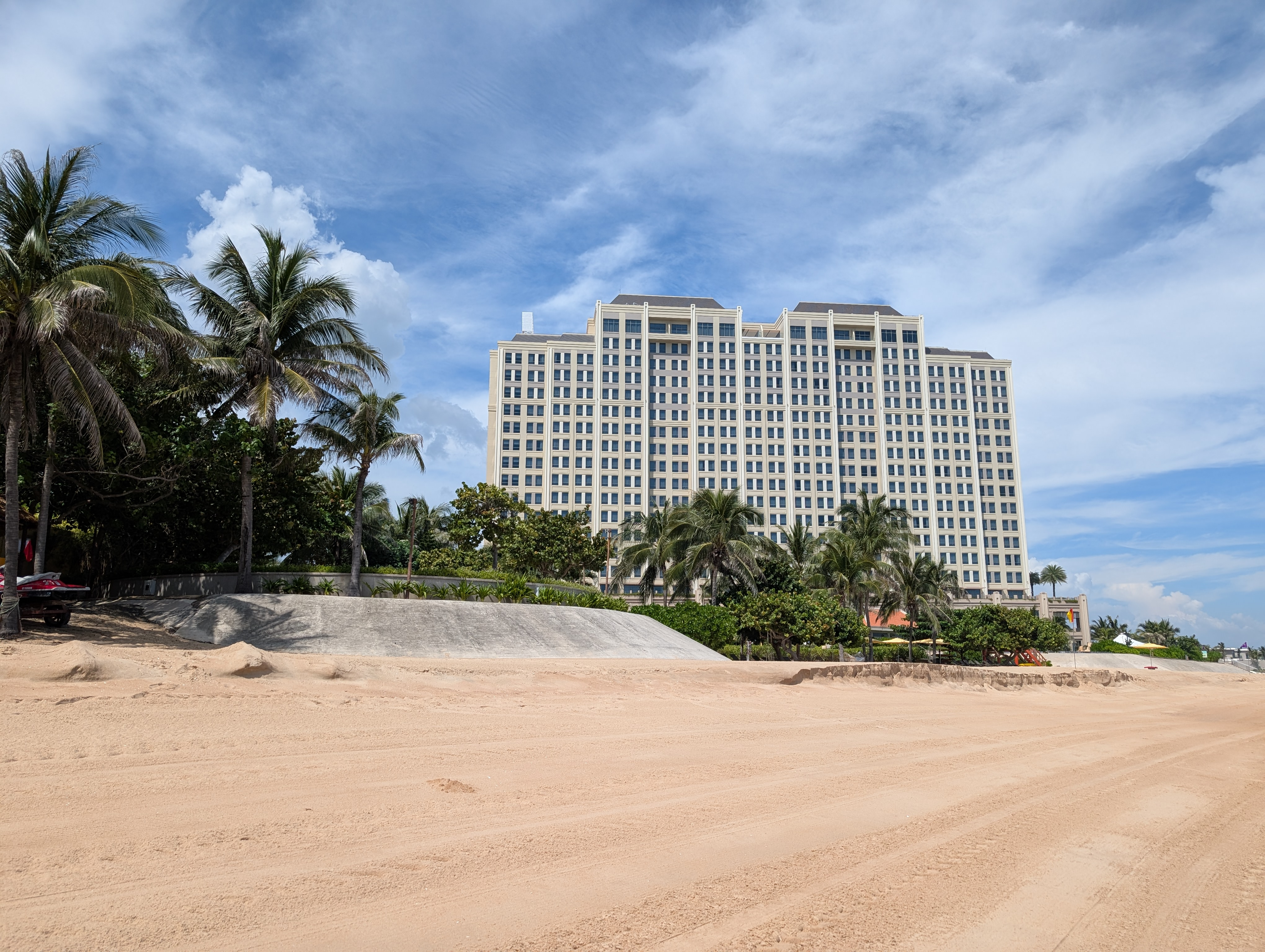
Holiday Inn Resort Ho Tram Beach

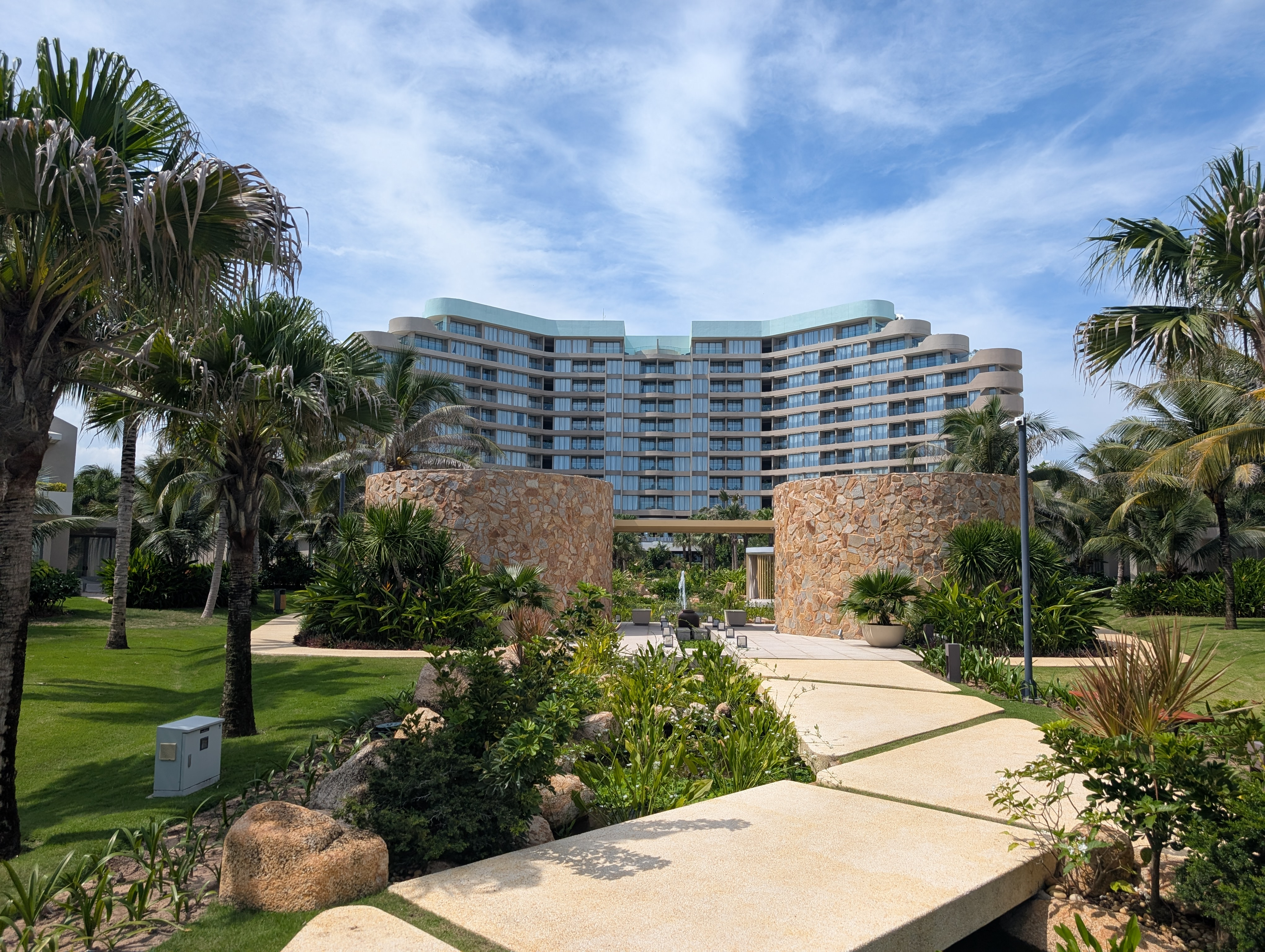
Ixora Ho Tram by Fusion

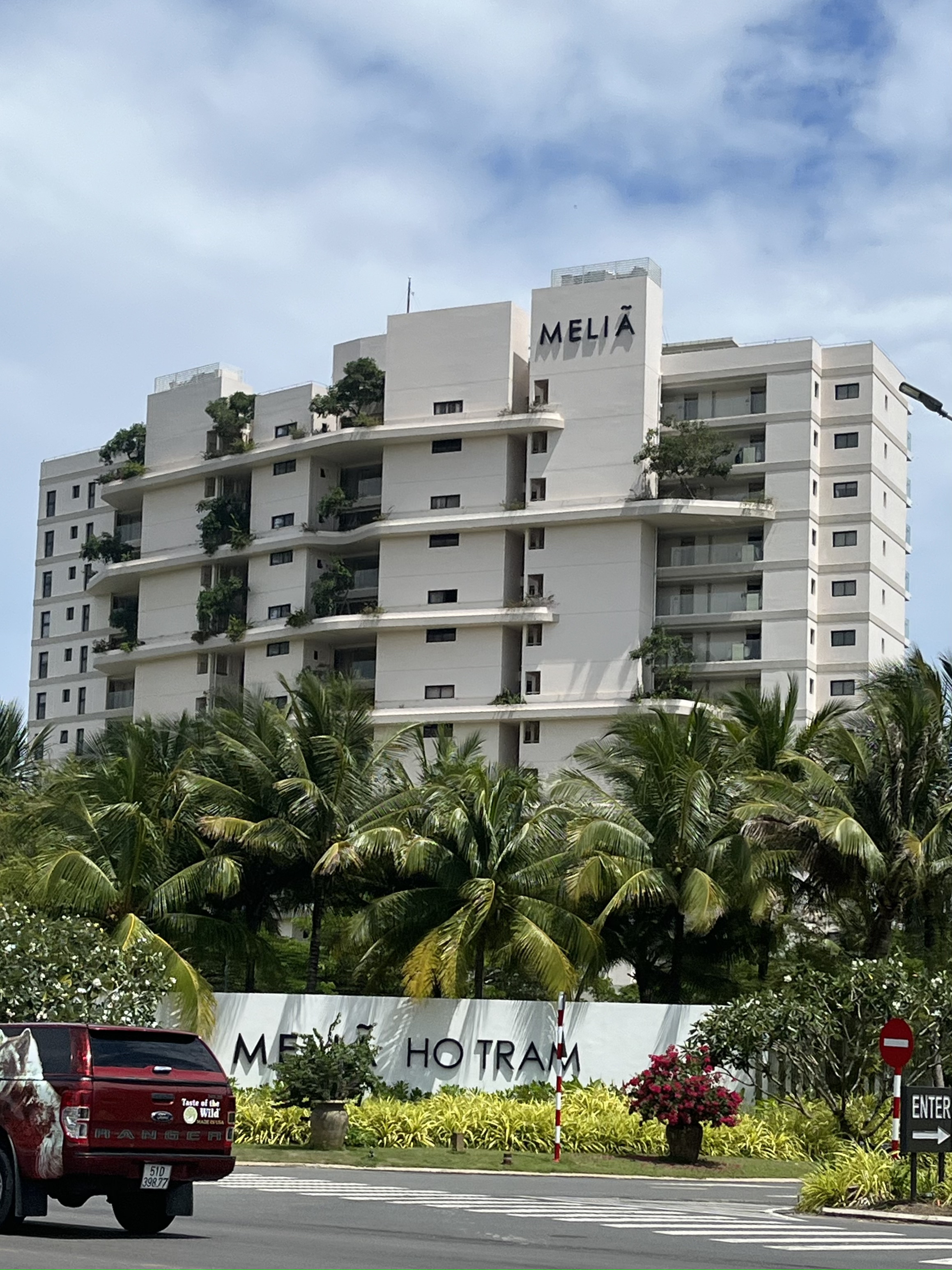
Meliã Ho Tram Beach Resort

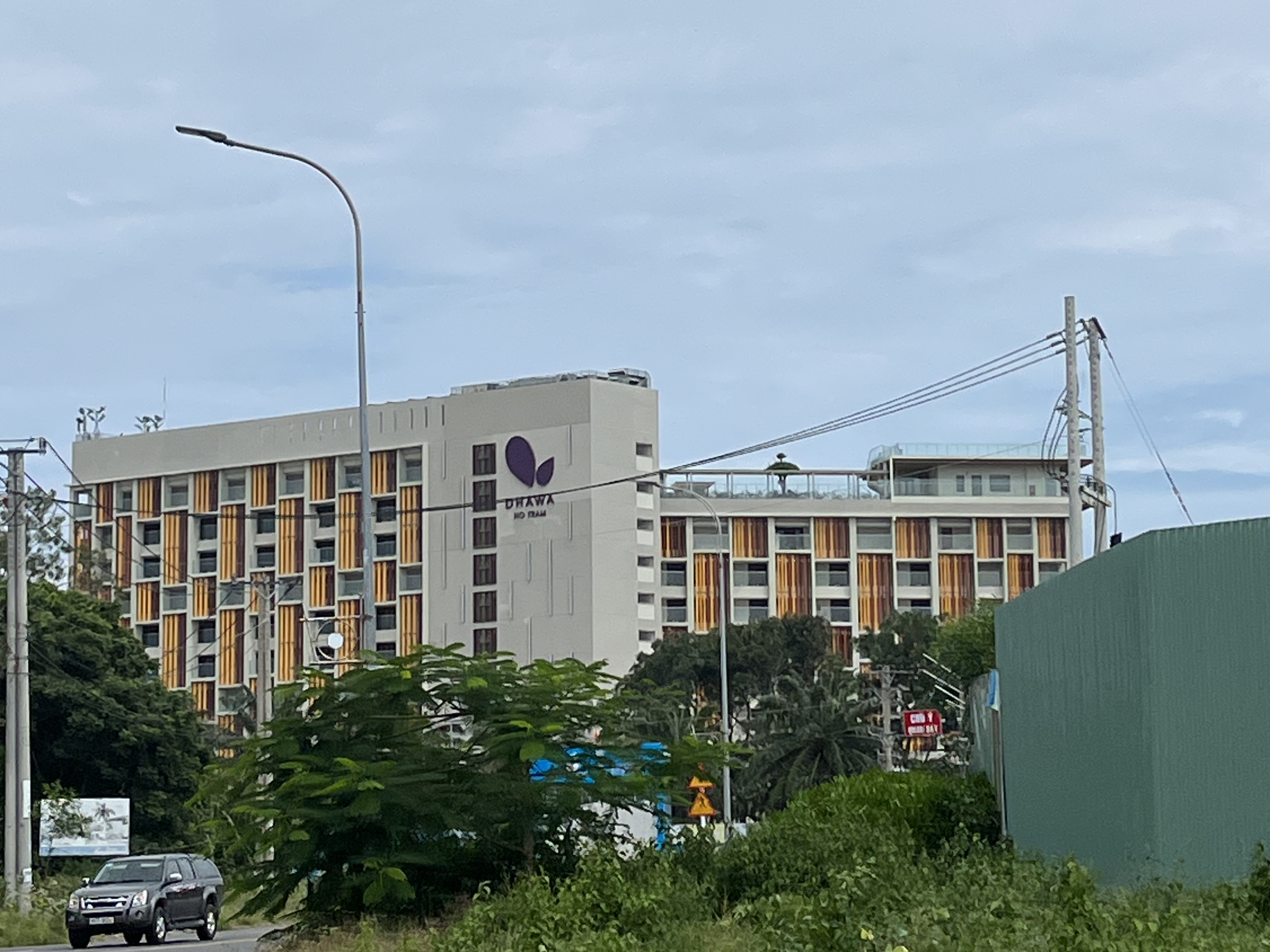
Dhawa Ho Tram

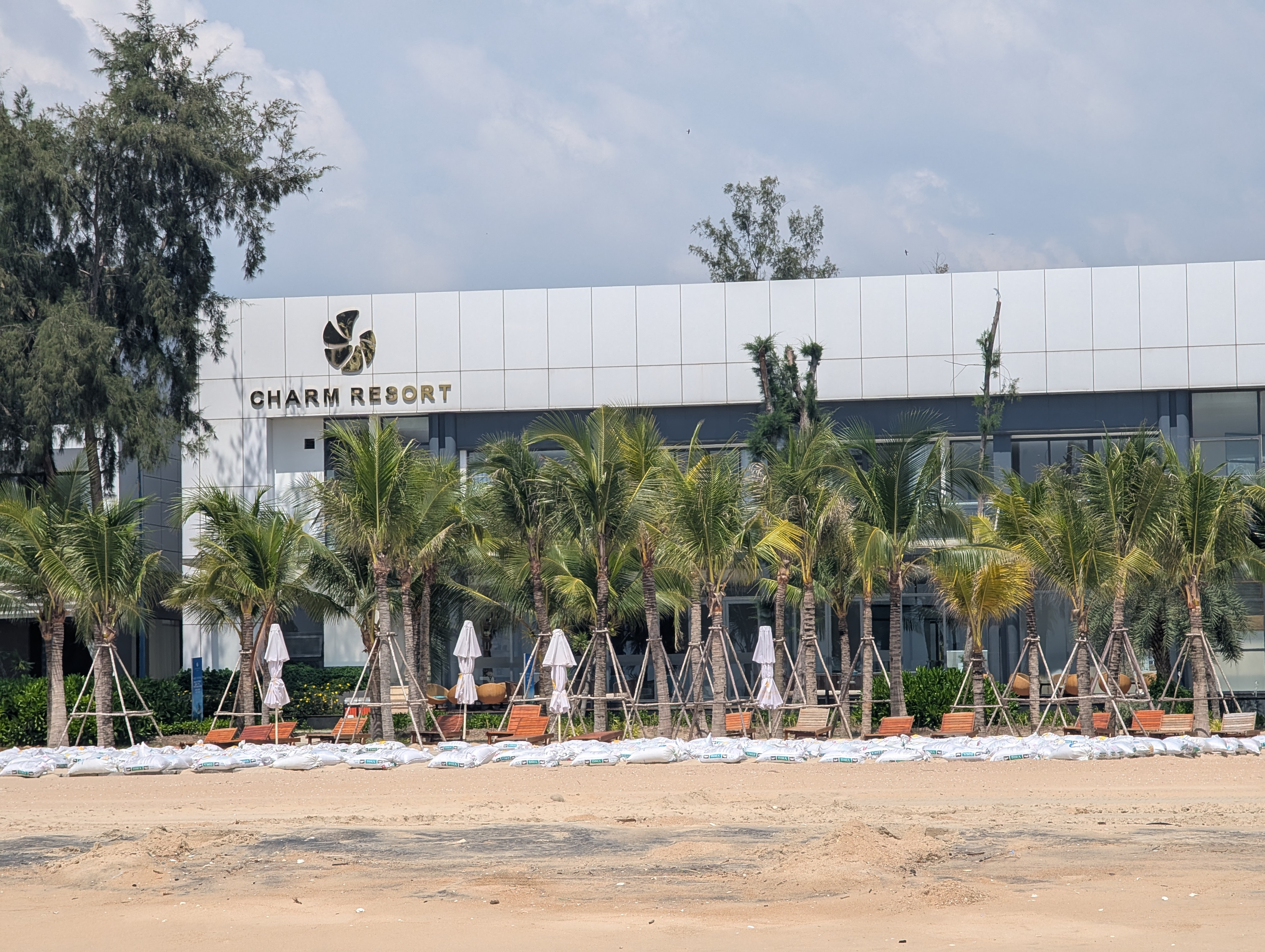
Charm Resort

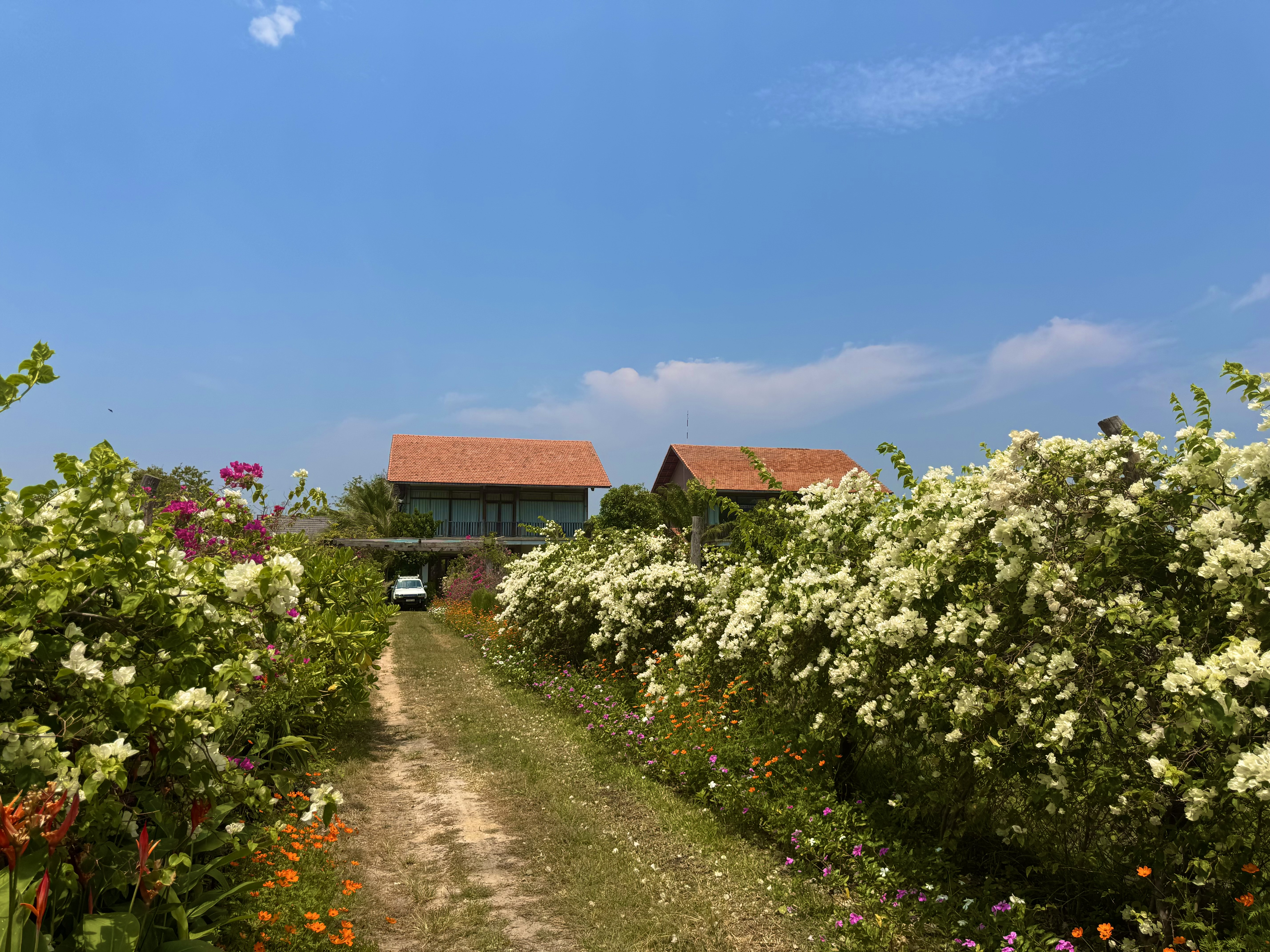
The Cottage Ho Tram Hills

== Gallery ==
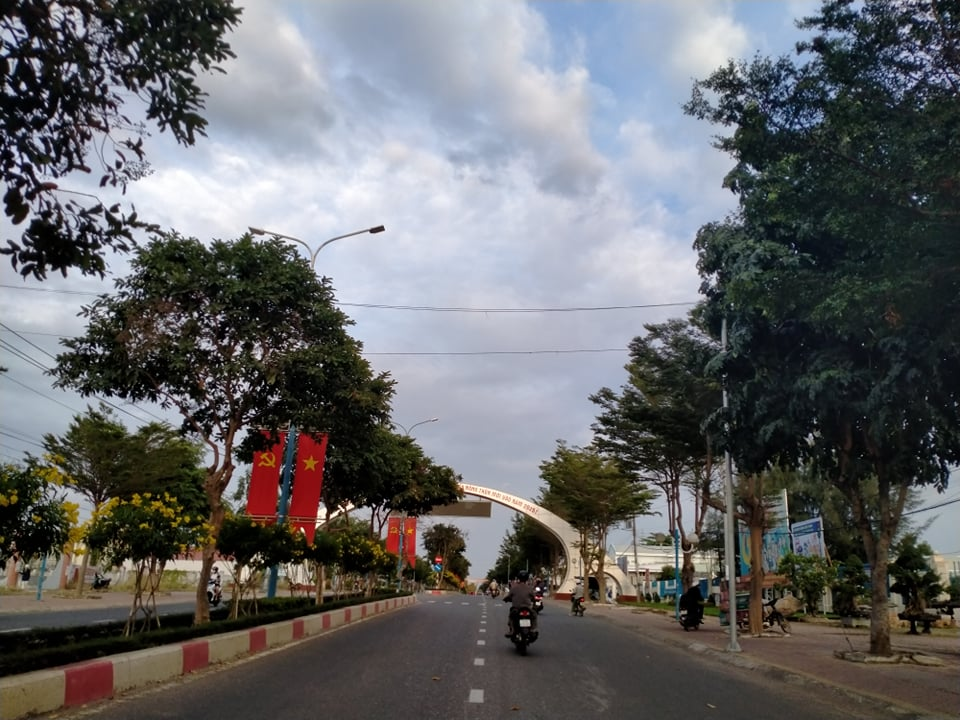
Phước Bửu town gate on National Route 55

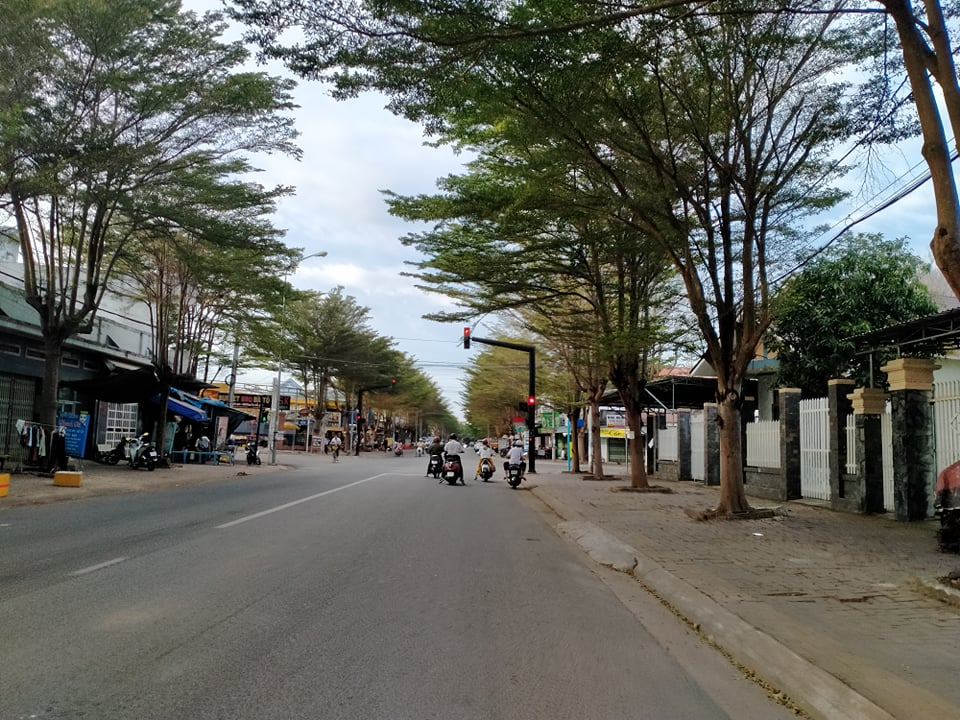
Huỳnh Minh Thạnh Street

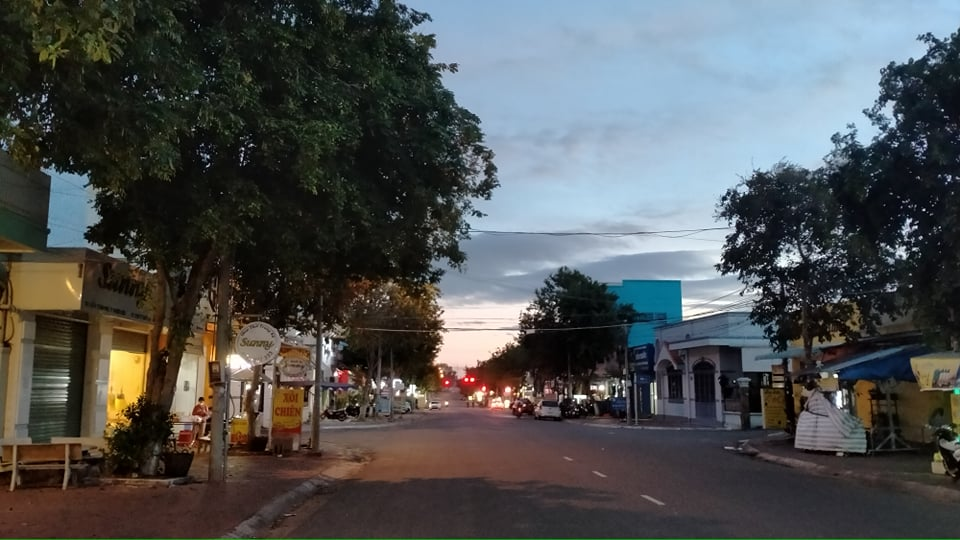
Trần Phú Street

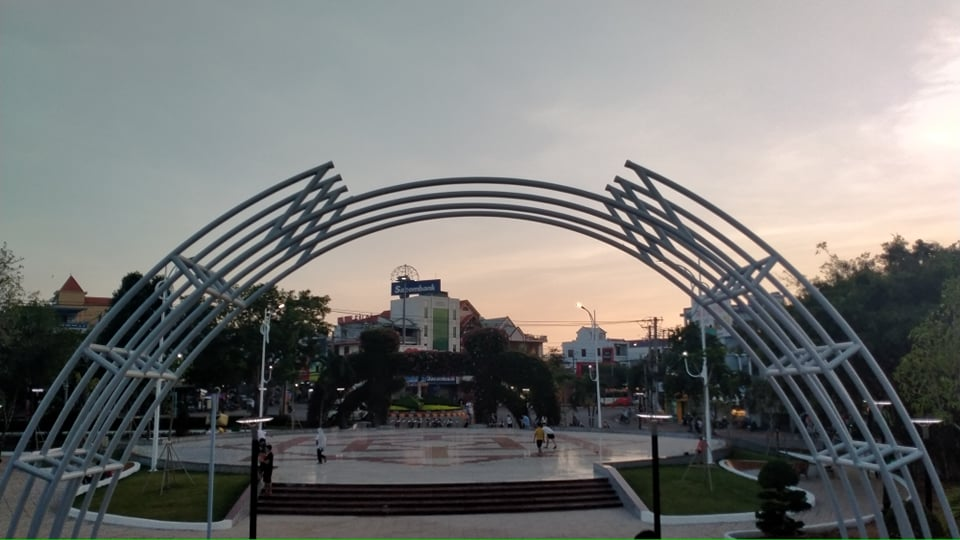
Lakeside Park

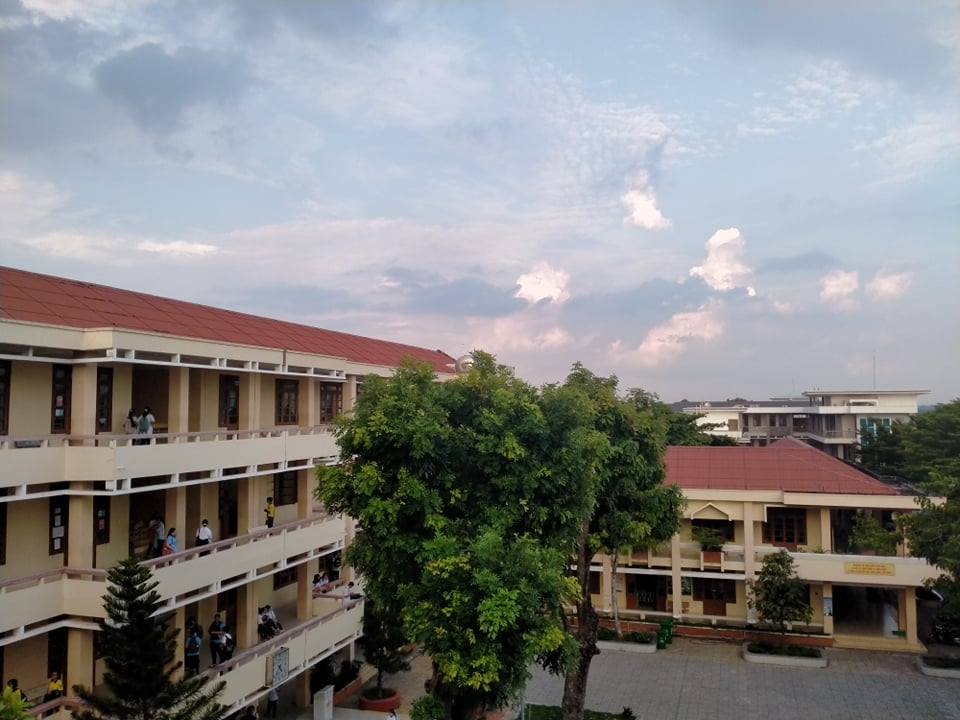
Xuyên Mộc High School

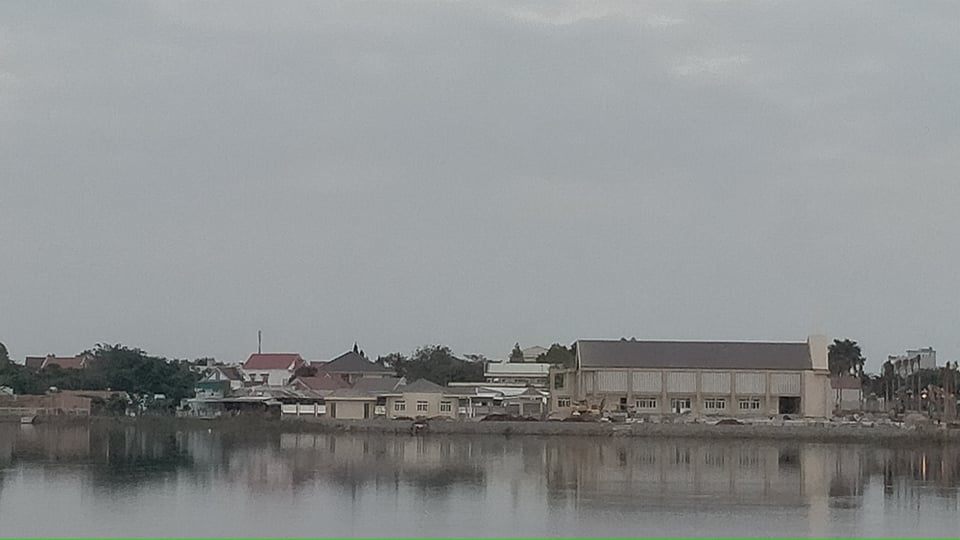
Phước Bửu Square

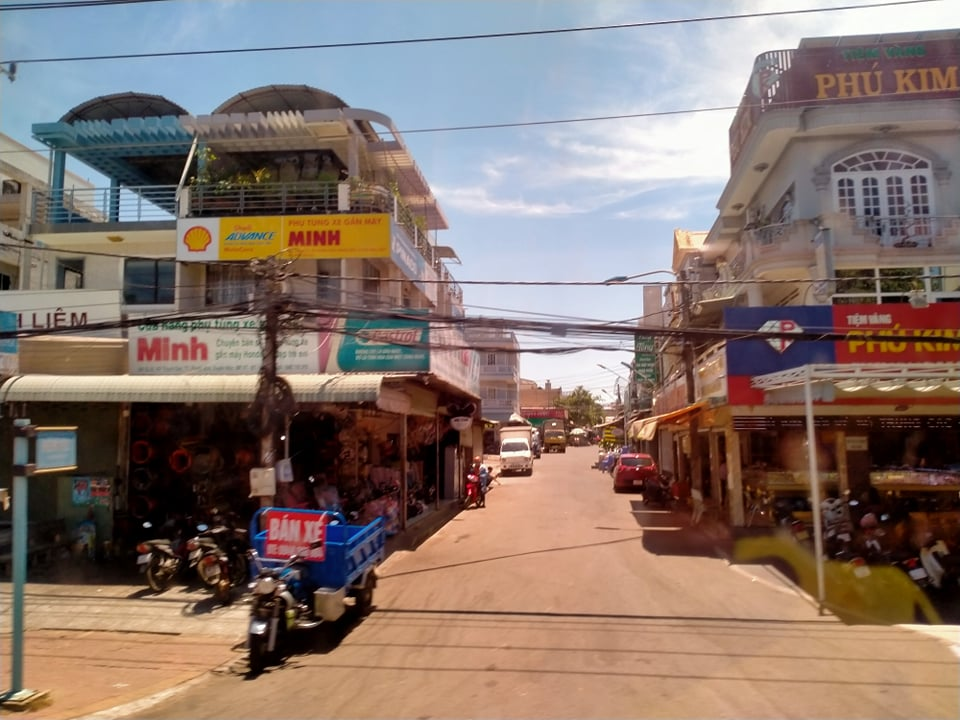
Bà Tô Market

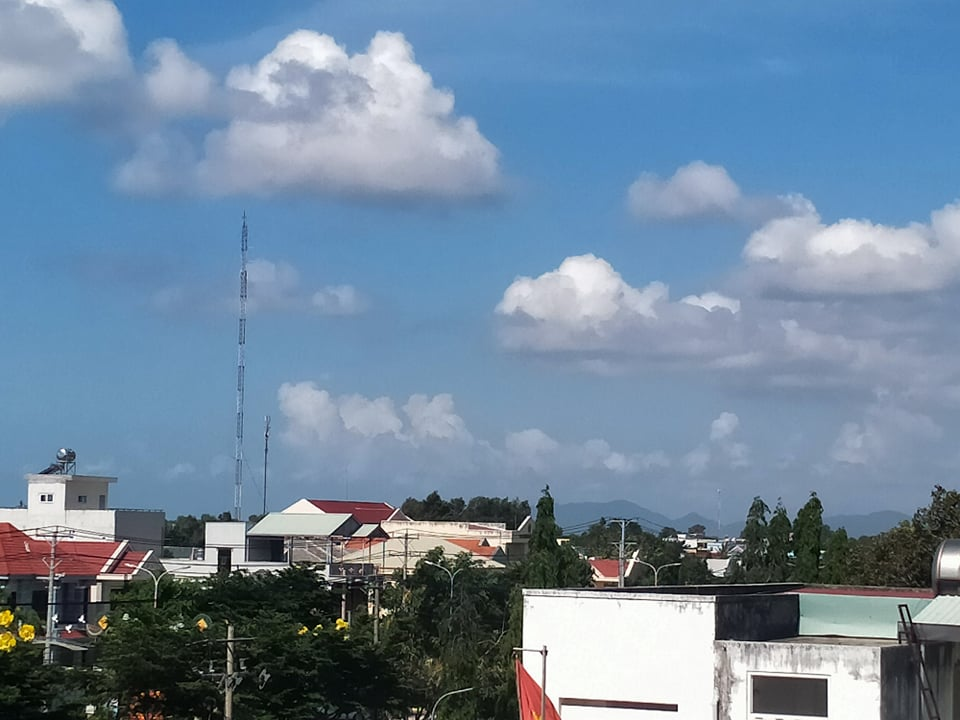
Former Phước Bửu town skyline

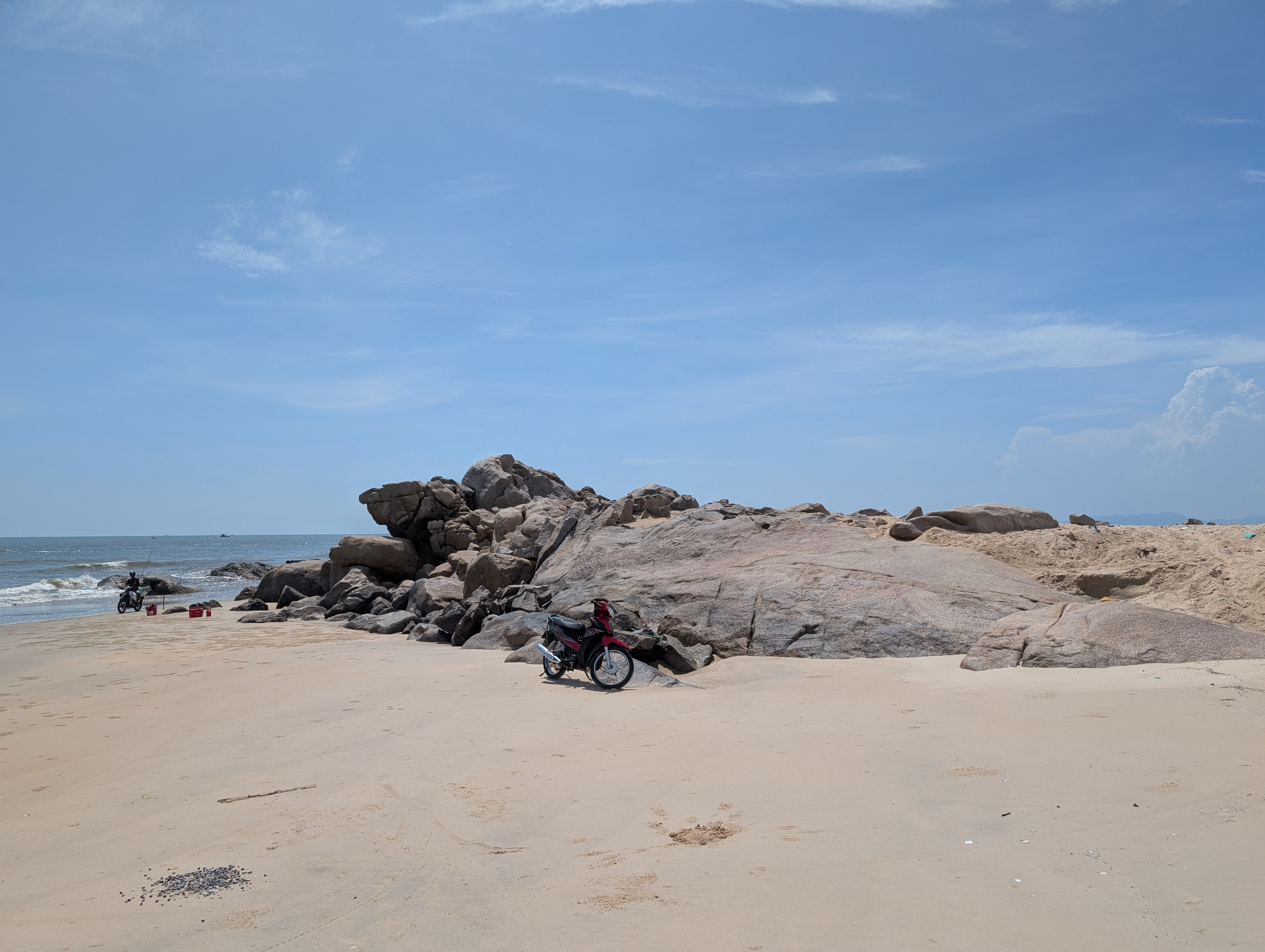
Hồ Tràm Cliff

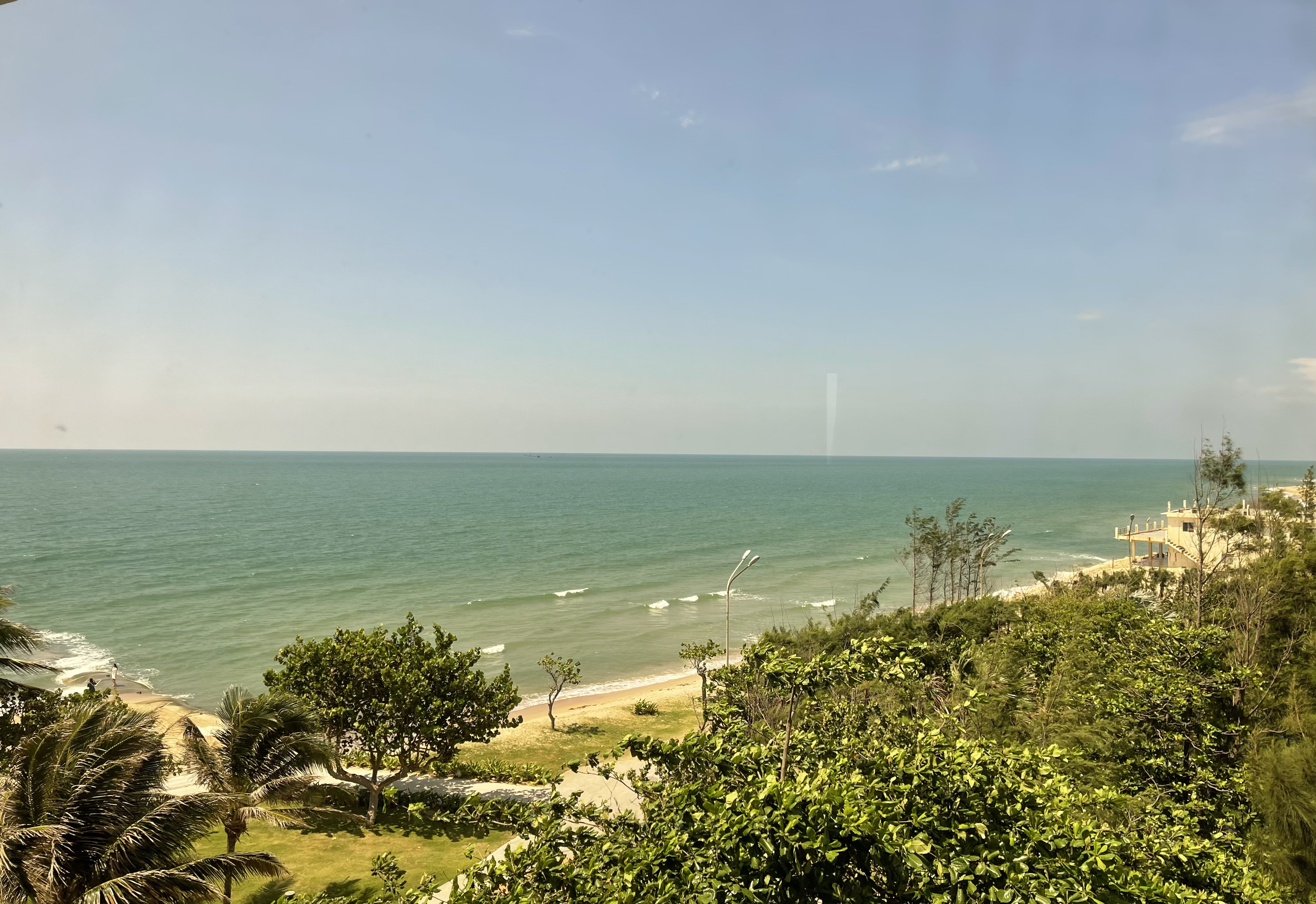
Hồ Tràm Beach
