= Ray River =

River in Vietnam

The Ray River (Vietnamese: Sông Ray) is a river of Vietnam. It flows north-south for 55 kilometres (34 mi) through Đồng Nai Province and Bà Rịa–Vũng Tàu province.
