= Bình Châu–Phước Bửu Nature Reserve =

Nature reserve in Vietnam

Coordinates: 10°32′00″N 107°30′15″E

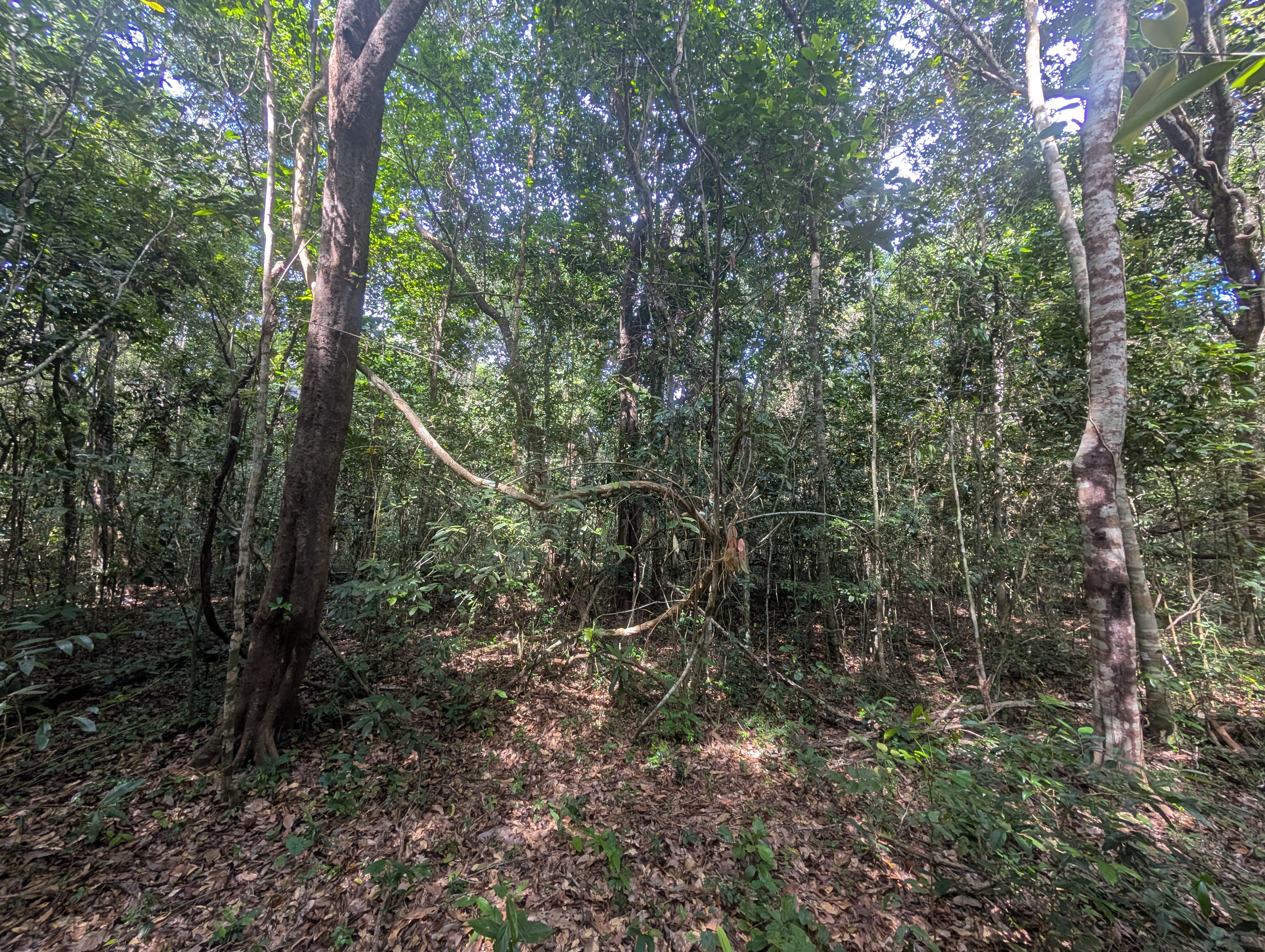
Inside the reserve

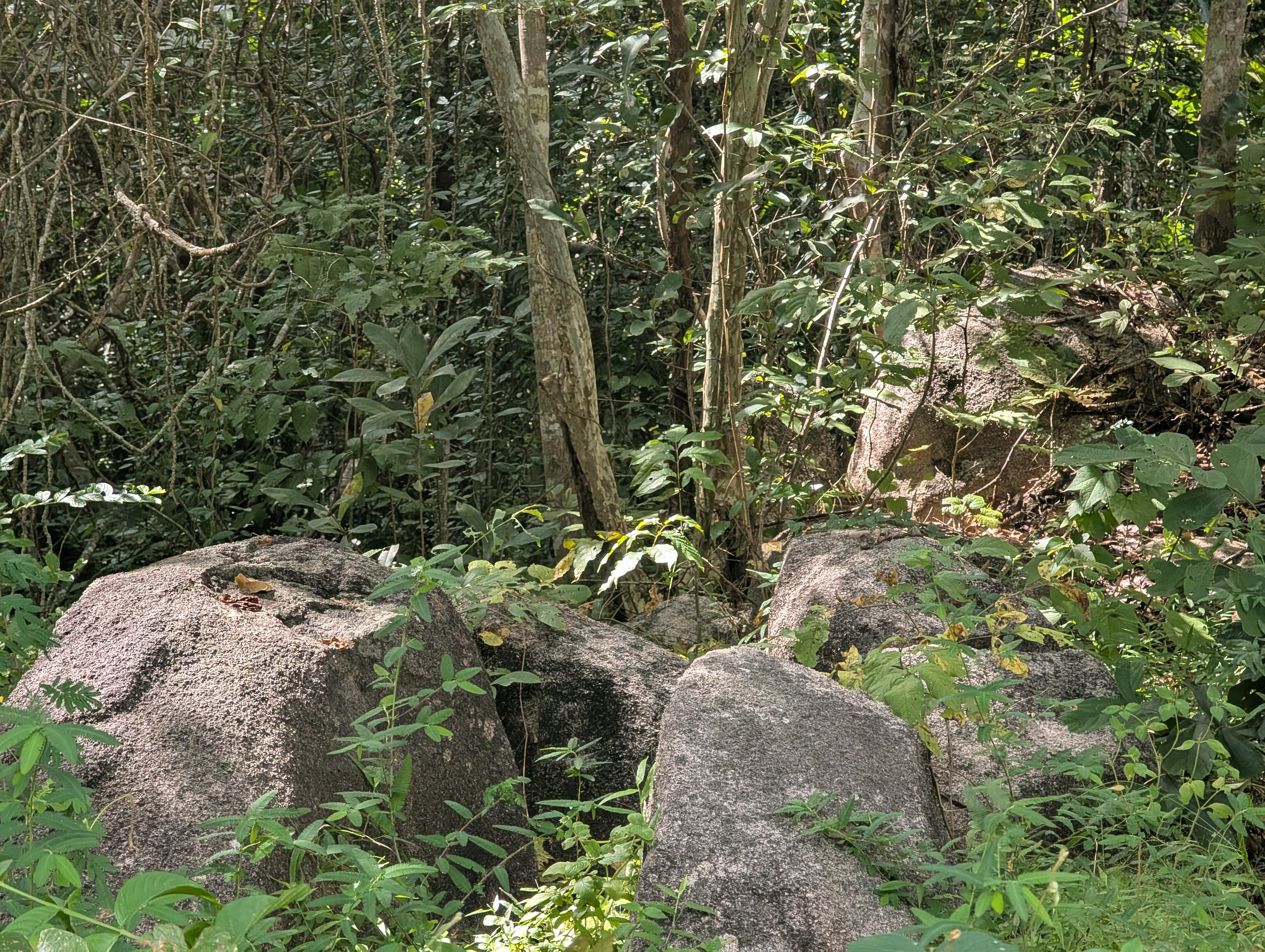
Rocks in the reserve

The Bình Châu–Phước Bửu Nature Reserve (also called Phuoc Buu nature reserve) is a 11,293 ha nature reserve in Phước Bửu, Vietnam.

== Description ==
Established in 1978, it was recognized as a specially protected natural area by the Vietnam Prime Minister.

It is a tropical rainforest, more exactly a tropical evergreen broad-leaved semi-deciduous forest, and the only remaining natural deciduous dipterocarp forest.

The nature reserve is surrounded by the Bình Châu and Phước Bửu towns on its North side, as well as by the Hồ Tràm and Hồ Cốc beach resorts on its South side. It contains the Núi Hồ Linh hill, 136 meters high.

It hosts at least 7 endangered species (red book of IUCN 2020). According to 2020 research, many rare and endangered species are threatened due to habitat change, and the number of individuals has decreased.
