= Bình Châu =

Bình Châu Xã Bình Châu
- Commune
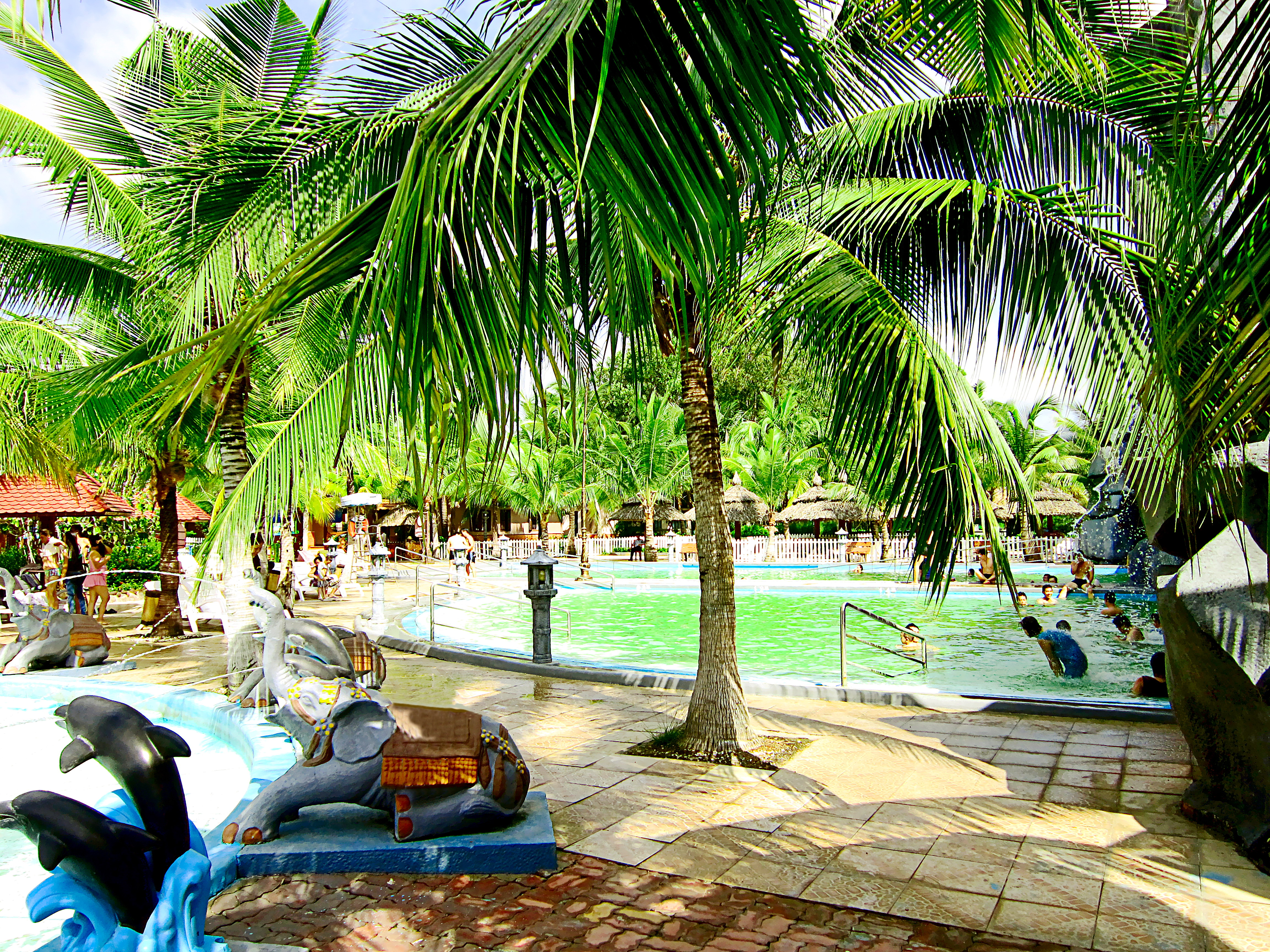
- Bình Châu hot springs
- Interactive map of Bình Châu
- Coordinates: 10°33′38″N 107°32′33″E
- Country: Vietnam
- Municipality: Ho Chi Minh City
- Established: June 16, 2025

Area
  - Total: 33.61 sq mi (87.06 km^{2})

Population (2024)
  - Total: 26,054
  - Density: 775.1/sq mi (299.3/km^{2})
- Time zone: UTC+07:00 (Indochina Time)
- Administrative code: 26656

Bình Châu (Vietnamese: Xã Bình Châu) is a commune of Ho Chi Minh City, Vietnam. It is one of the 168 new wards, communes and special zones of the city following the reorganization in 2025.

== Demographics ==
As of December 31, 2024, Bình Châu recorded a population of 26,054 inhabitants.
