= Hòa Hiệp, Ho Chi Minh City =

Hòa Hiệp Xã Hòa Hiệp
- Commune
- Interactive map of Hòa Hiệp
- Coordinates: 10°42′29″N 107°29′47″E
- Country: Vietnam
- Municipality: Ho Chi Minh City
- Established: June 16, 2025

Area
  - Total: 38.33 sq mi (99.28 km^{2})

Population (2024)
  - Total: 25,995
  - Density: 678.2/sq mi (261.8/km^{2})
- Time zone: UTC+07:00 (Indochina Time)
- Administrative code: 26647

Hòa Hiệp (Vietnamese: Xã Hòa Hiệp) is a commune of Ho Chi Minh City, Vietnam. It is one of the 168 new wards, communes and special zones of the city following the reorganization in 2025.
