= Hòa Hội, Ho Chi Minh City =

Hòa Hội Xã Hòa Hội
- Commune
- Interactive map of Hòa Hội
- Coordinates: 10°37′38″N 107°27′22″E
- Country: Vietnam
- Municipality: Ho Chi Minh City
- Established: June 16, 2025

Area
  - Total: 52.61 sq mi (136.27 km^{2})

Population (2024)
  - Total: 36,174
  - Density: 687.53/sq mi (265.46/km^{2})
- Time zone: UTC+07:00 (Indochina Time)
- Administrative code: 26641

Hòa Hội (Vietnamese: Xã Hòa Hội) is a commune of Ho Chi Minh City, Vietnam. It is one of the 168 new wards, communes and special zones of the city following the reorganization in 2025.

== History ==
On June 16, 2025, the National Assembly Standing Committee issued Resolution No. 1685/NQ-UBTVQH15 on the arrangement of commune-level administrative units of Ho Chi Minh City in 2025 (effective from June 16, 2025). Accordingly, the entire land area and population of Hòa Hưng, Hòa Bình and Hòa Hội communes of the former Xuyên Mộc district will be integrated into a new commune named Hòa Hội (Clause 161, Article 1).
