= Ho Chi Minh City–Long Thanh–Dau Giay Expressway =

Road in Vietnam

Ho Chi Minh City–Long Thanh–Dau Giay Expressway
- Đường cao tốc Thành phố Hồ Chí Minh–Long Thành–Dầu Giây
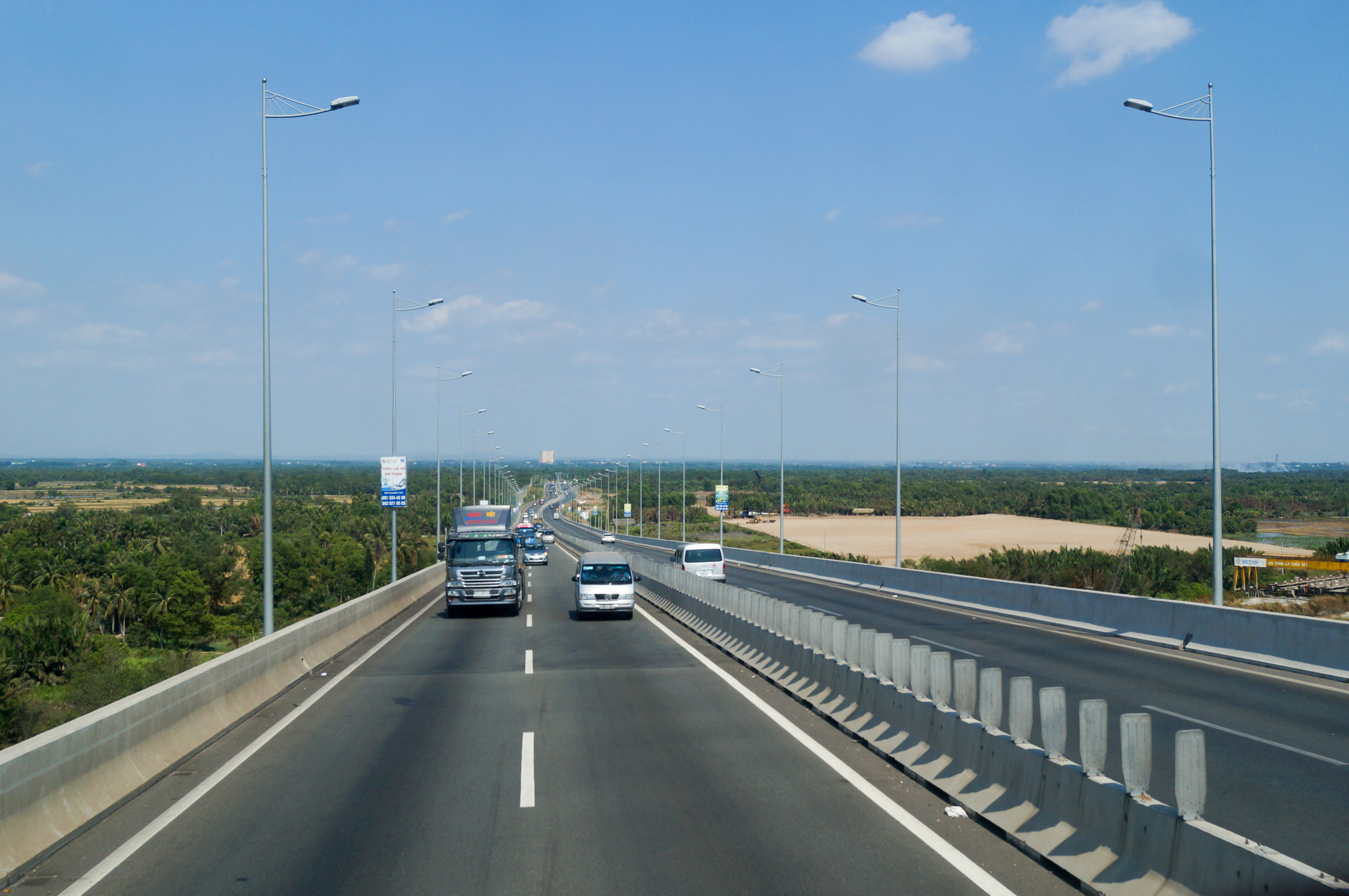
- Long Thành bridge on the route passes Đồng Nai river

Route information
- Part of (Long Thành - Cẩm Mỹ); AH1 (Cẩm Mỹ - Long Trường)
- Maintained by Vietnam Expressway Corp (VEC)
- Length: 34 mi (55 km)
- Existed: 8 February 2015–present

Major junctions
- West end: Mai Chí Thọ Blvd (East–West Highway), Streets of Lương Định Của and Nguyễn Thị Định at An Phú Interchange, District 2, Ho Chi Minh City
- Ring Road 2 Interchange, Phú Hữu, Thủ Đức, Ho Chi Minh City; Ring Road 3 Interchange, at Long Trường, Thủ Đức, Ho Chi Minh City; AH17 at NH51 Interchange, Long Thành District, Đồng Nai Province; at Long Thành Interchange, Long Thành District, Đồng Nai Province; at Lộ 25 Interchange, Thống Nhất District, Đồng Nai Province
- East end: AH1 at Dầu Giây Interchange, Thống Nhất District, Đồng Nai Province.

Location
- Country: Vietnam
- Municipalities: Hồ Chí Minh City, Đồng Nai

Highway system
- Transport in Vietnam

The Ho Chi Minh City–Long Thanh–Dau Giay Expressway ( Vietnamese: Đường cao tốc Thành phố Hồ Chí Minh–Long Thành–Dầu Giây) is an expressway section of the Expressways of Vietnam, 55.7 km long and has its starting point at An Phú Interchange in Thủ Đức and the end point at Dầu Giây Interchange, Thống Nhất district, Đồng Nai. Most of the expressway is part of the Asian Highway Network (AH1).

This route passes through Ho Chi Minh City and Đồng Nai Province, also connect the downtown Ho Chi Minh City with Long Thanh International Airport, the future main airport of Ho Chi Minh City metropolitan area.

== Planning ==
According to planning from 2015 to 2021, this entire expressway used to be part of the North-South Expressway before being separated into an independent expressway (only the Long Thành - Lộ 25 section still belongs to this system). However, in reality, this expressway is still denoted as CT.01 on some signposts of this expressway. This expressway is part of the AH1 system (section of Lộ 25 - Long Trường).

== Construction ==
=== Construction ===
The project was started on October 3, 2009 with a scale of 4 lanes and a total length of 55.7 km. The investor is Vietnam Expressway Development Investment Corporation (VEC) with total investment in phase I: 997.67 million USD (equivalent to 20,630 billion VND). The project is sponsored by the Asian Development Bank (ADB) and the Japan International Cooperation Agency (JICA).

=== Completion ===
About 20 km out of a total of 55 km of the expressway, the section from Ring Road 2 to National Highway 51 in Đồng Nai province was opened to traffic on 2 January 2014. On 29 August 2014, Ring Road 2 intersection opened to traffic. The 4 km long road from An Phú interchange, Mai Chí Thọ Avenue (part of East–West Highway) to Ring Road 2 intersection opened to traffic on 10 January 2015. All The expressway opened to traffic on 2 February 2015, when the 31 km long Long Thanh - Dau Giay section completed construction.

=== Extension ===
Currently, Vietnam Expressway Development Investment Corporation (VEC) is researching investment in expanding the section from Ring Road 2 intersection to the intersection with Bien Hoa - Vung Tau Expressway, 21.92 km long, from 4 to 8 - 10 lanes, total investment is about 14,786 billion VND.

== Design ==
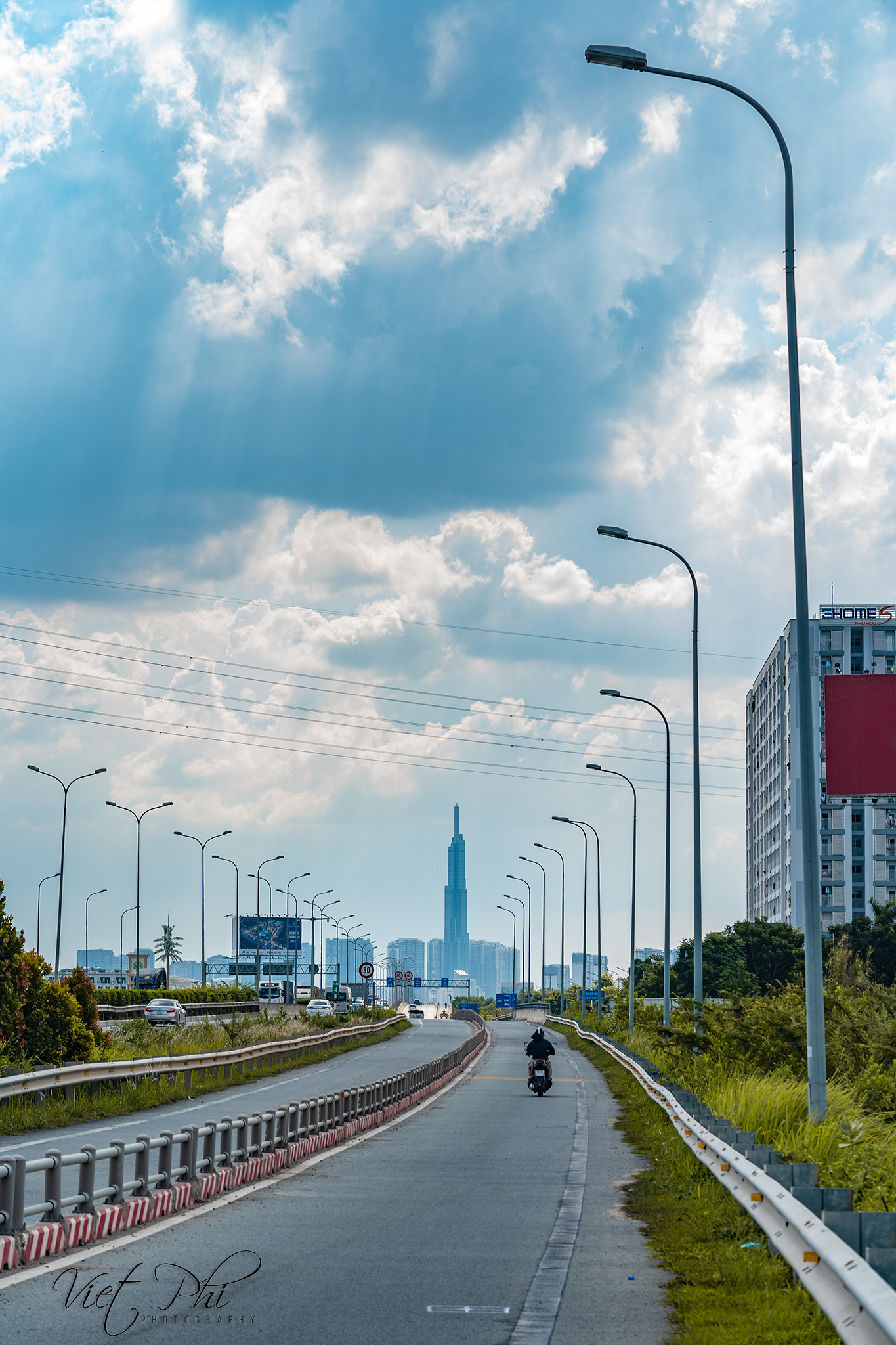
Direction of the expressway leading to An Phú Interchange in Ho Chi Minh City

The expressway has a total length of 55.7 km and is divided into two sections:

- An Phú-Ring Road II section: 4 km long, designed according to urban road standards, design speed 80 km/h; Phase 1 scale: four lanes, roadbed width 26.5 m, road surface width 2×7.5 m and emergency stop lane width 2×3 m.
- Ring Road II-Long Thanh-Dau Giay section: designed according to type A Expressway standards TCVN 5729–97, design speed 120 km/h (except Long Thanh Bridge with design speed 100 km/h); Scale of phase 1: 4 lanes, 27.5 m wide roadbed, 2×7.5 m wide road surface and 2×3 m wide emergency stopping lane.

== Route details ==
Speed information table

=== Lanes ===
- 4 lanes + 2 shoulder
- Long Thành Bridge: 4 lanes

=== Length ===
Total length: 55.7 km

=== Speed ===
- An Phú-Ring Road II: 80 kilometres per hour (50 mph)
- Ring Road II-Long Thành-Dầu Giây: 60–120 kilometres per hour (37–75 mph)
- Long Thành Bridge: 100 kilometres per hour (62 mph)

== List of interchanges and features ==
- IC - interchange, JCT - junction, SA - service area, PA - parking area, BS - bus stop, TN - tunnel, TB - toll gate, BR - bridge
- The section coinciding with has its route and intersection number written in italics

No.	Name	Dist. from Origin (km)	Connections	Notes	Location	
Connect with Lương Định Của Road
1	An Phú IC	0.0	Mai Chí Thọ–Võ Văn Kiệt Highway	Beginning of the expressway Construction is underway to expand the scale of the intersection	Ho Chi Minh City	Thủ Đức
2	Global City JCT	8.7	D3 Street	Exit to D3 street Entrance towards An Phu	Ho Chi Minh City	Thủ Đức
3	Đỗ Xuân Hợp JCT	2.6	Đỗ Xuân Hợp Road	Exit to Do Xuan Hop street Entrance towards An Phu	Ho Chi Minh City	Thủ Đức
4	Khang Điền JCT	3.6		Exit towards An Phu	Ho Chi Minh City	Thủ Đức
5	Ring Road 2 IC	5.9	Võ Chí Công Road		Ho Chi Minh City	Thủ Đức
6	Long Trường IC	8.7	Ring Road 3 HCMC	Under Construction	Ho Chi Minh City	Thủ Đức
TG	Long Phước Tollgate	10.8			Ho Chi Minh City	Thủ Đức
7	Long Phước IC		Long Phước Road	Proposing	Ho Chi Minh City	Thủ Đức
BR	Long Thanh Bridge	↓		pass Đồng Nai River	Ho Chi Minh City – Đồng Nai Boundary	
SA	Tam An Technical Maintenance Center	14.0			Đồng Nai	Long Thành
8	Tam An IC		District Road 2	No construction	Đồng Nai	Long Thành
9	Nhơn Trạch IC	19.9	Provincial Road 319		Đồng Nai	Nhơn Trạch
10	National Highway 51 IC	23.5	National Highway 51		Đồng Nai	Long Thành
11 (3)	Long Thành IC	25.4 (1766.5)	Bien Hoa–Vung Tau Expressway	Connect with Ben Luc – Long Thanh Expressway	Đồng Nai	Long Thành
12 (2)	Ring Road 4 IC	39.2 (1762.7)	Ring Road 4 HCMC	No construction	Đồng Nai	Cẩm Mỹ
SA	Rest stop	41.2 (1760.7)			Đồng Nai	Cẩm Mỹ
13 (1)	Cẩm Mỹ IC	43.5 (1758.4)	Phan Thiet–Dau Giay Expressway		Đồng Nai	Thống Nhất
TG	Dầu Giây Tollgate	54.6			Đồng Nai	Thống Nhất
BR		↓		Pass North–South railway	Đồng Nai	Thống Nhất
14	Dầu Giây IC	55.7	National Highway 1		Đồng Nai	Thống Nhất
Connect directly to Dau Giay–Lien Khuong Expressway (No construction)
1.000 mi = 1.609 km; 1.000 km = 0.621 mi: Closed/former; Proposed; Incomplete access; Route transition; Unopened
