= National Route 51 (Vietnam) =

Road in Vietnam

National Route 51
- Quốc lộ 51
- Trường Chinh Street (Long Thành); Độc Lập Street (Phú Mỹ); Võ Nguyên Giáp Street (Vũng Tàu)
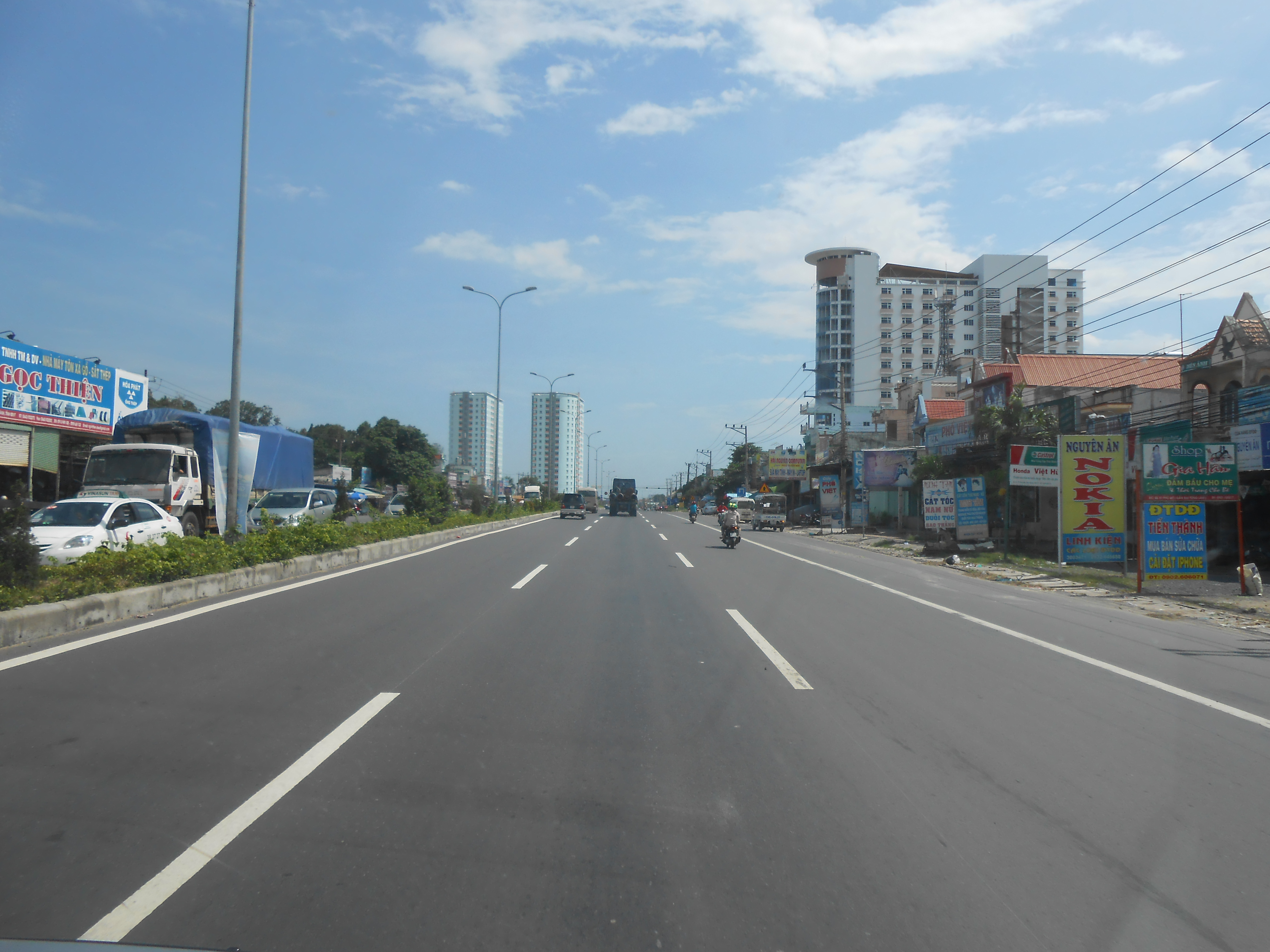
- National Route 51 at Phú Mỹ, Ba Ria Vung Tau

Route information
- Part of AH17
- Length: 86 km (53 mi)

Major junctions
- North end: Vũng Tàu Intersection in Long Hưng, Đồng Nai
- Ben Luc – Long Thanh Expressway at Phước Thái Intersection in Long Thành, Đồng Nai and in Bà Rịa
- South end: Cửa Lấp Bridge Roundabout, Phước Thắng, Ho Chi Minh City

Location
- Country: Vietnam
- Provinces: Đồng Nai
- Districts: Long Thành district

Highway system
- Transport in Vietnam
← QL 50	→ QL 52

National Route 51 (Vietnamese: Quốc lộ 51) is a highway starting from the city of Biên Hòa to Vũng Tàu in the Southeast region of Vietnam, passing Biên Hòa City, Long Thành district in Đồng Nai province and the cities of Phú Mỹ, Bà Rịa and Vũng Tàu in Bà Rịa–Vũng Tàu province (all former administrative divisions). This is the backbone route linking Bà Rịa–Vũng Tàu province with Đồng Nai province and Ho Chi Minh City and also a part of Asian Highway 17 (planned to replace it by Bien Hoa–Vung Tau Expressway).

With a total length of 85.6 km, with of 15 to 23 km, this road includes 15 bridges, going through several important industrial parks of the Principal Economic Area of South Vietnam, an area which includes province in Southeast region. The towns and cities along this road include: Long Thành (where Long Thanh International Airport is under construction), Tam An Town, Nhơn Trạch City, Phú Mỹ (an important electricity hub of Vietnam). This national road starts from the roundabout in Biên Hòa city, 20 km northeast of Saigon Bridge of Ho Chi Minh City through Hanoi Highway.

== History ==
=== South Vietnam period ===
National Route 51 before 1975 was named as National Route 15 by the South Vietnam government, at that time National Route 15 included is stretch from the former National Route 1 (now is Nguyễn Ái Quốc Boulevard, part of National Route 1K [vi]) at Vườn Mít 4-way intersection to Suối Quan Bridge intersection (near Gate 11 roundabout) and from Suối Quan Bridge intersection to Cửa Lấp Bridge roundabout at Vũng Tàu.

=== Modern Vietnam period ===
After the reunification, the national highway system in the South was rearranged, and at the same time, the Biên Hòa City bypass route from the Suối Quan Bridge intersection to the Vũng Tàu intersection was built. This bypass route, along with the section from the Suối Quan Bridge intersection to the Cửa Lấp Bridge roundabout, was renamed National Highway 51 as it is today. The section from the Vườn Mít intersection to the Suối Quan Bridge intersection was renamed to Phạm Văn Thuận and Bùi Văn Hòa (both meet at Tam Hiệp intersection).

In 2014, when Võ Nguyên Giáp street (the bypass) was completed, it intersects with Bùi Văn Hòa street to form the 4-way roundabout of Gate 11 (Cổng 11).

== Length and segments ==
Length of National Route 51 through every province and its districts, cities:

- Đồng Nai: Biên Hòa City and Long Thành, 37 km.
- Length of the route throughout Biên Hòa City: 17 km (Km 0 - Km 17)
  - Long Bình Tân, Biên Hòa
  - An Hòa, Biên Hòa
  - Phước Tân, Biên Hòa
  - Tam Phước, Biên Hòa
- Length of the route throughout Long Thành: dài 20 km (Km 17 - Km 37). Also known as Trường Chinh or Lê Duẩn Street in Long Thành, from Trầu Stream T-intersection to Long An commune
  - An Phước commune, Long Thành
  - Long Đức, huyện Long Thành
  - Lộc An commune, huyện Long Thành
  - Long Thành town, huyện Long Thành
  - Long An commune, huyện Long Thành
  - Long Phước commune, huyện Long Thành
  - Phước Thái commune, huyện Long Thành
  - Phước Bình commune, huyện Long Thành

The border between Đồng Nai province and Bà Rịa – Vũng Tàu on National Highway 51 is located at Sonadezi Gò Dầu Industrial Park, the border area is in Hamlet 2, Phước Bình commune, Long Thành, Đồng Nai and Phú Hà quarter, Mỹ Xuân ward, Phú Mỹ, Bà Rịa – Vũng Tàu.

- Bà Rịa – Vũng Tàu: throughout three cities of Phú Mỹ, Bà Rịa and Vũng Tàu: 49 km.
- Length of the route throughout Phú Mỹ: Dài 23 km (Km 37 - Km 60). Also known as Độc Lập Street in Phú Mỹ, from Thị Vải Bridge to Nguyễn Huệ Street
  - Mỹ Xuân, Phú Mỹ
  - Phú Mỹ, Phú Mỹ
  - Tân Phước, Phú Mỹ
  - Phước Hòa, Phú Mỹ
  - Tân Hòa, Phú Mỹ
  - Tân Hải, Phú Mỹ
- Length of the route throughout Bà Rịa: Dài 16 km (Km 60 - Km 76)
  - Kim Dinh, Bà Rịa
  - Long Hương, Bà Rịa
  - Phước Trung, Bà Rịa
- Length of the route throughout Vũng Tàu: Dài 10 km (Km 76 - Km 86). Also known as Võ Nguyên Giáp Street in Vũng Tàu, from Cỏ May Bridge to Cửa Lấp Roundabout
  - Ward 12, Vũng Tàu

== All major junctions ==
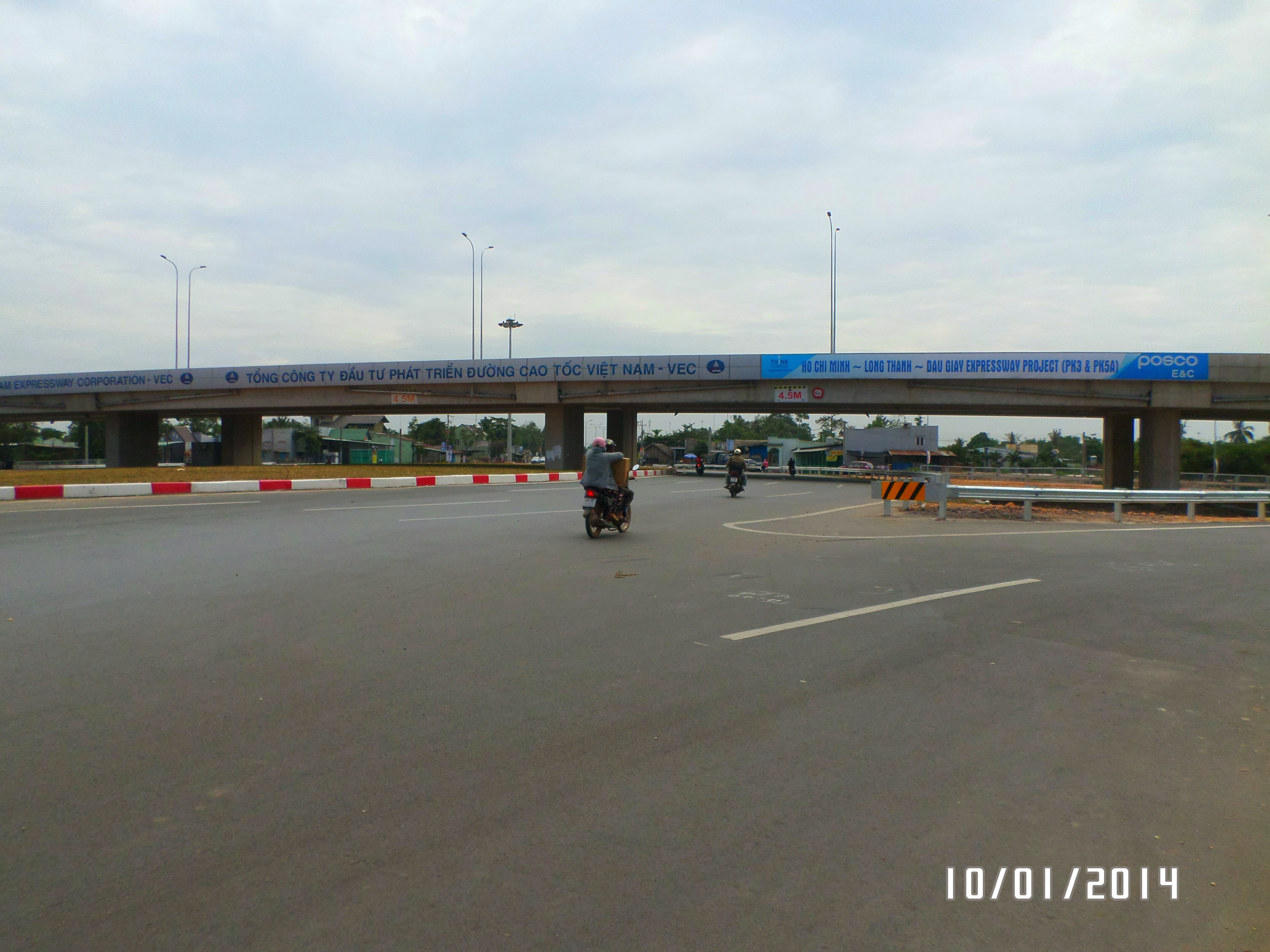
Ho Chi Minh City–Long Thanh–Dau Giay Expressway overpass crosses National Route 51 at Long Thành

- Bến Gỗ T-junction crosses with District Road 2 (now is Ngô Quyền Street) leads to Long Hưng Urban Area (Aqua City by Novaland Group)
- Quan Stream Bridge (Cầu Suối Quan) Y-junction crosses with Bùi Văn Hòa street. When Võ Nguyên Giáp street near here was completed (also known as Biên Hòa City bypass), the intersection became a 4-way intersection and called as Gate 11 intersection (Ngã tư Cổng 11), after the 11th Gate of the nearby Long Bình Post now was resized into industrial park and residential area.
- Thailand T-junction crosses with Phùng Hưng Street (Tam Phước, Biên Hòa, Đồng Nai): Phùng Hưng Street here is the borderline of Biên Hòa City and Long Thành district, Đồng Nai. Before 1972, in the period of Vietnam-America war, a Thai army unit that joined the Allied forces was stationed in this area. The road in front led to the Armor School of the Army of the Republic of Vietnam. Today, that area is the Army School of the People's Army of Vietnam. This road can connect with other roads to Dầu Giây.
- Lộc An 4-way: crosses with Provincial road 769 from National Route 51 in Long Thành township, provincial road 769 cut route 51B (now is Trường Chinh Street) at Lộc An then lead to Dầu Giây 4-way
- Cầu Xéo T-junction, crosses with provincial road 769 at Xéo Bridge (Cầu Xéo) distant from Long Thành town for 1 km. Road 769 leads to Nhơn Trạch and Cát Lái ferry.
- Long Thành 4-way roundabout, crosses with Hồ Chí Minh City – Long Thành – Dầu Giây Expressway
- T-junction of Dầu Khí (Gas and oil) or also known as T-junction of Nhơn Trạch (Long Thành): crosses with provincial road 25B (now is Tôn Đức Thắng Street). Tôn Đức Thắng Street leads to the district center of Nhơn Trạch and Cát Lái ferry to come to Thủ Đức, Hồ Chí Minh City.
- Bà Ký T-junction (huyện Long Thành): intersection with District road 12 that from the Highway 51 leads to the market Long Thọ commune, Nhơn Trạch.
- Bàu Cạn T-junction or previously called as 67 T-junction, Long Thành): crosses with the inter-commune road from Route 51 to Bàu Cạn commune, Long Thành district, rubber plantation (nông trường cao su) of Thái Hiệp Thành, Đồi 61 commune, Trảng Bom district.
- Phước Thái intersection with Bến Lức – Long Thành Expressway at Phước Thái, Long Thành district.
- Mỹ Xuân T-junction (Phú Mỹ): to Ngãi Giao, Hắc Dịch, Hồ Tràm Osaka tourism area, Hồ Cốc
- Long Hương T-junction (thành phố Bà Rịa): crosses with National Route 56, to city of Long Khánh, Đồng Nai
- Bà Rịa Y-junction roundabout (thành phố Bà Rịa): to National Route 55, La Gi town, Lâm Đồng

=== Toll plazas ===
There are 3 toll plazas on the route:

- T1 at Thailand T-junction of Km 11 Tam Phước, Đồng Nai
- T2 at Km 29, Long An commune, Long Thành
- T3 is called as Long Sơn Toll Plaza at Km 56, Tân Hải, Phú Mỹ, Bà Rịa – Vũng Tàu

== Specifications ==
- Total length: 86 km;
- Width: road surface from 25 m to 38 m wide, paved with asphalt concrete;
- There are 15 bridges on the road, load capacity from 13 tons to 25 tons;
- Road type: level I plain road. Cross-section suitable for 8 mixed lanes. Particularly from the Roundabout
- Along the road are residential areas, newly established industrial parks such as Long Thành, Tam An, Nhơn Trạch, Mỹ Xuân, Phú Mỹ...
- It is a vital road connecting Bà Rịa – Vũng Tàu with other provinces and cities in the economic development triangle of the South: Ho Chi Minh City, Đồng Nai and Bà Rịa – Vũng Tàu

== Bypasses ==
National Highway 51 when entering Vung Tau city runs on the west bank and opens 2 more roads to the east, respectively 51B and 51C. Currently, September 2nd Street in Vung Tau city is being used for National Highway 51. 30-4 Street is converted into a local road.

On August 2, 2009, the project to expand National Highway 51 to 8 lanes was officially started, with a total investment of up to 3,200 billion VND..
