= Ho Chi Minh City metropolitan area =

Ho Chi Minh City Metropolitan Area Vùng đô thị Thành phố Hồ Chí Minh
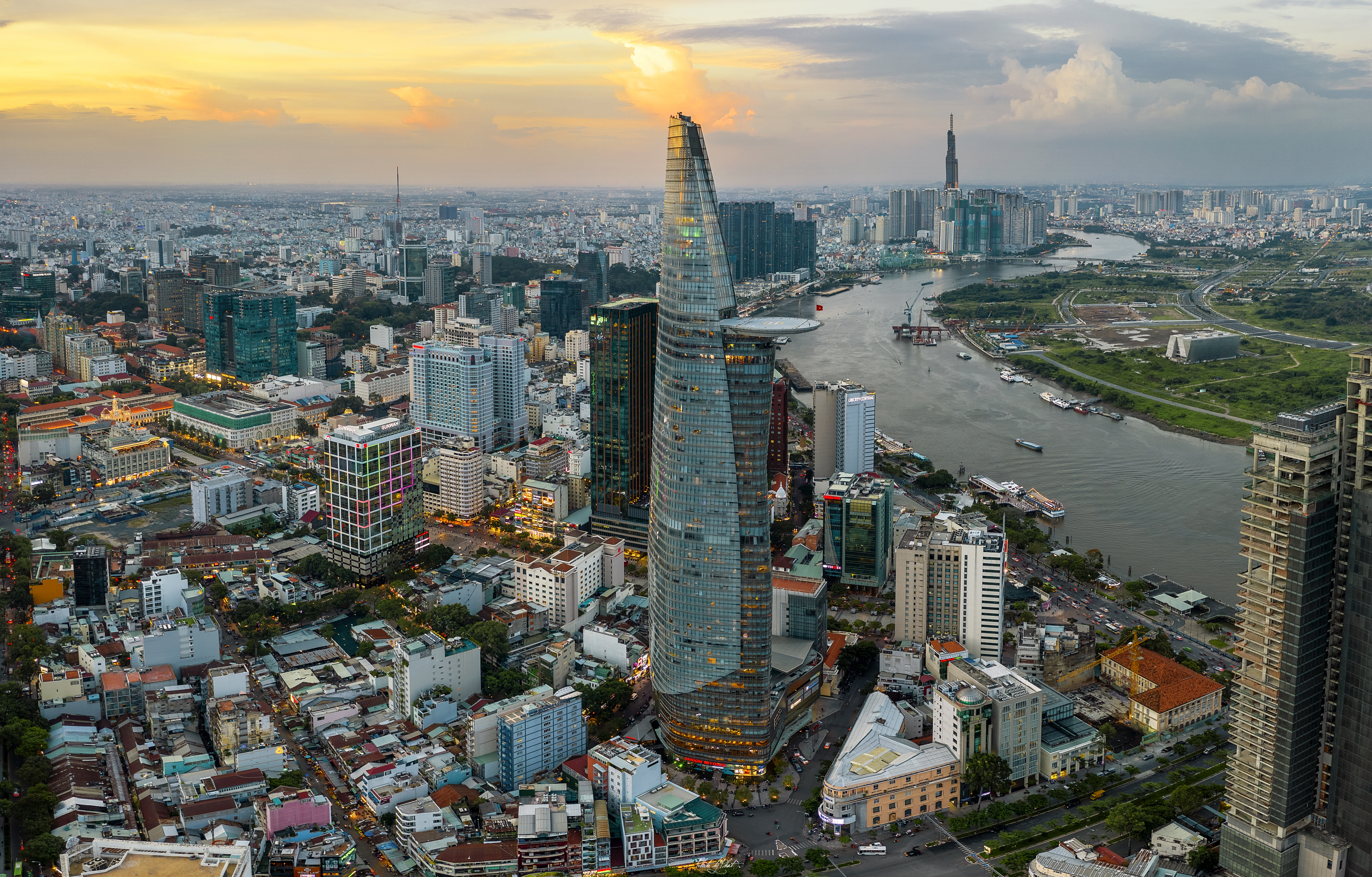
- Ho Chi Minh City, the largest city in the metropolitan area

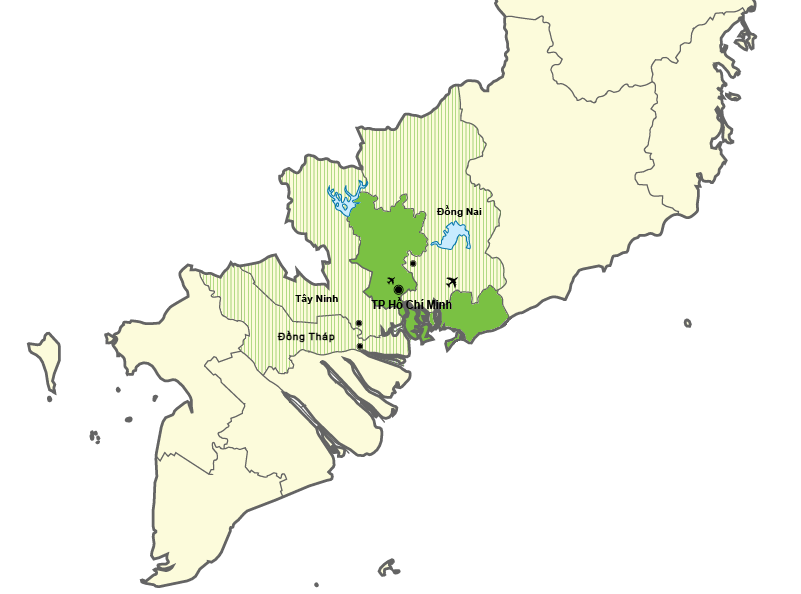
- Map of Ho Chi Minh City metropolitan area consists of 2 provinces, 1 municipality and Ho Chi Minh City
- Country: Vietnam

Area
  - Metro: 30,595 km^{2} (11,813 sq mi)

Population
  - Metro: 21,281,639
  - Metro density: 695.59/km^{2} (1,801.6/sq mi)

GDP
  - Metro: US$117.3 billion
- Time zone: UTC+7 (UTC +7)

Ho Chi Minh City metropolitan area (Vietnamese: Vùng đô thị Thành phố Hồ Chí Minh) is a metropolitan area that was proposed by the Ministry of Construction of Vietnam to the Government of Vietnam for approval in June 2008. According to this master plan, this metropolitan area will include provinces around Ho Chi Minh City in the Southeast region and 2 provinces in the Mekong Delta region.

This metropolitan area currently has an area of 30,404 square kilometres with radius of 150–200 km, a population of 20–22 million inhabitants, of which urban residents account for 16–17 million indicating an urbanisation rate of 77–80%. By 2050, the population will have increased to 25-27 million people, and the urbanized rate is estimated to rise to 90%. Constructed land will be 1800–2100 square kilometres by 2020. Ho Chi Minh City will be the core urban center of the area while other surrounding cities and towns will play their role as satellite municipalities. Baria-Vungtau will serve as the main deepwater seaport of the region, especially Sao Mai-Ben Dinh seaport, Thi Vai Port. Long Thanh International Airport and Tan Son Nhat International Airport will serve as the air traffic hub of the region. Hi-tech park will be located in Ho Chi Minh City while other heavy industry will concentrate in Đồng Nai, Bình Dương and Bà Rịa–Vũng Tàu. Vũng Tàu is planned to serve as a tourism hub, with coastal beaches and several entertainment resort projects.

== Major cities prior to July 2025 ==
Name	Type	Province	Class	Area (sq. km)	Population	Density (people per sq. km)
Ho Chi Minh City	Municipality		Special Class	2,095.239	8,993,082	4292.15
Biên Hòa	Provincial city	Đồng Nai province	Class I	264.08	1,055,414	3996.57
Vũng Tàu	Provincial city	Ho Chi Minh City	Class I	141.01	527,025	3737.5
Thủ Dầu Một	Provincial city	Ho Chi Minh City	Class I	118.67	325,521	2743.08
Mỹ Tho	Provincial city	Đồng Tháp province	Class I	81.54	220,109	2699.4
Thủ Đức	Municipal city	Ho Chi Minh City	Class I	211.56	1,013,795	4792
Bà Rịa	Provincial city	Ho Chi Minh City	Class II	91.5	205,192	2242.54
Tân An	Provincial city	Tây Ninh province	Class II	81.94	145,120	1771.05
Tây Ninh	Provincial city	Tây Ninh province	Class III	140	132,592	947.09
Đồng Xoài	Provincial city	Đồng Nai province	Class III	167.03	108,595	650.15
Long Khánh	Provincial city	Đồng Nai province	Class III	191.75	171,276	893.23
Thuận An	Provincial city	Đồng Nai province	Class III	83.71	596,227	7122.53
Dĩ An	Provincial city	Đồng Nai province	Class II	60.10	403,760	6718.14
Gò Công	Provincial city	Tiền Giang province	Class III	101.99	98,959	970.28
Bến Cát	Provincial city	Đồng Nai province	Class III	234.42	306,438	1307.22
Tân Uyên	Provincial city	Đồng Nai province	Class III	192.5	370,512	192.47
Phú Mỹ	District-level town	Ho Chi Minh City	Class III	333.84	207,688	622.12
Cai Lậy	District-level town	Đồng Tháp province	Class III	140.19	143,050	1020.4
Bình Long	District-level town	Đồng Nai province	Class IV	126.02	105,520	837.33
Phước Long	District-level town	Đồng Nai province	Class IV	118.8	81,200	683.5
Kiến Tường	District-level town	Long An province	Class IV	204.36	43,674	213.71
Hòa Thành	District-level town	Tây Ninh province	Class IV	82.92	147,666	1780.82
Trảng Bàng	District-level town	Tây Ninh province	Class IV	340.14	161,831	475.78
Chơn Thành	District	Đồng Nai province	Class IV	383.59	107,350	279.86
Long Thành	Commune-level town	Đồng Nai province	Class IV	9.28	52,000	5603.45
Trảng Bom	Commune-level town	Đồng Nai province	Class IV	15.71	57,560	3663.91
Bến Lức	Commune-level town	Tây Ninh province	Class IV	8.71	16,851	1934.67
Hậu Nghĩa	Commune-level town	Tây Ninh province	Class IV	11.36	13,070	1150.53
Đức Hòa	Commune-level town	Tây Ninh province	Class IV	7.33	10,468	1428.1
Cần Giuộc	Commune-level town	Tây Ninh province	Class IV	21.05	53,877	2559.48
Cần Đước	Commune-level town	Tây Ninh province	Class IV	5.75	12,147	2112.52

== Transportation ==
=== Air transport ===
As of 2008, Tan Son Nhat International Airport is the only airport in use with the designed capacity of 15-17 million passengers per annum. Long Thanh International Airport which located in Đồng Nai, 40 km northeast of Ho Chi Minh City constructed in 2010. This new airport will have full designed capacity of 80-100 million passengers annually. The estimated investment capital is US$8 billion and due to be completed in 2015 (phase I) and 2020 (phase II). Once the first phase is completed, this airport will be capable to serve 20 million passengers per year.

=== Ports ===
Most of the principal ports will concentrate in Ho Chi Minh City and Bà Rịa–Vũng Tàu. In 2007, all ports in Ho Chi Minh City alone handled 50.5 million metric tons of cargo.

== Highway ==
National Highway 1A, the core road in Vietnam crosses this region. Other expressways are under construction include: Long Thành-Dầu Giây-Đà Lạt Expressway, Saigon-Cần Thơ Expressway, Trans-Asian Highway, 3 belt ring expressways in Ho Chi Minh City, Biên Hòa-Vũng Tàu Expressway, Tân An-Biên Hòa Expressway.

=== Railway ===
Together with the trans-Vietnam railway development, Ho Chi Minh City-Nha Trang express railway will be built after 2010 to enable an average speed of 300 km/hour. Ho Chi Minh City Metro is currently under construction.

== Education ==
This region is currently home to more than 40 universities and 40 colleges and hundreds of vocational schools, included Vietnam National University, Ho Chi Minh City.

== Economy ==
Ho Chi Minh City will host the region's financial, commercial, hi-tech, educational, transportation and communication services. Vũng Tàu will be the seaside entertainment hub as well as petroleum center (oil and gas exploitation, oil refinery, LPG production), steel, fertilizer, electricity. Đồng Nai and Bình Dương will focus on electrical and electronic industry, food processing, machinery, textile, footwear, furniture.

== See also ==
- Hanoi Capital Region
