= Bà Rịa–Vũng Tàu province =

Former province of Vietnam

Bà Rịa – Vũng Tàu Phước Tuy
- Province
- Bà Rịa – Vũng Tàu Province
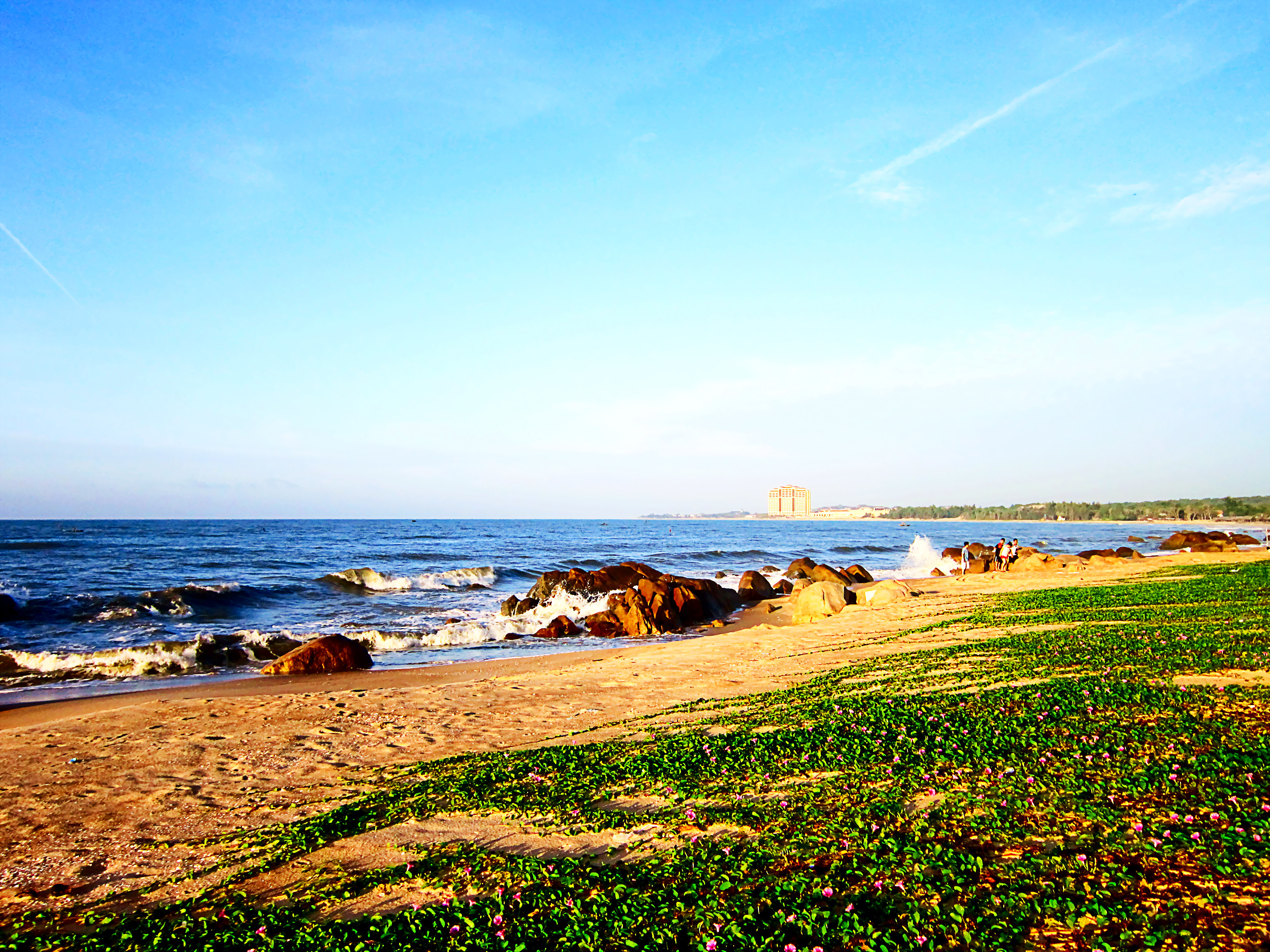
- Hồ Cốc Beach

- Seal
- Nickname: A Place to Dock Boats
- Location of Bà Rịa–Vũng Tàu within Vietnam

- Location within Vietnam Location within Asia
- Coordinates: 10°35′N 107°15′E
- Country: Vietnam
- Region: Southeast
- Metropolitan area: Ho Chi Minh City metropolitan area
- Capital: Bà Rịa
- Largest city and former capital: Vũng Tàu (until 2 May 2012)

Government
  - People's Council Chair: Nguyễn Hồng Lĩnh
  - People's Committee Chair: Nguyễn Thành Long
  - Secretary of Bà Rịa–Vũng Tàu Party Committee: Nguyễn Hồng Lĩnh

Area
  - Total: 1,982.56 km^{2} (765.47 sq mi)

Population (2025)
  - Total: 1,313,905
  - Density: 662.732/km^{2} (1,716.47/sq mi)

Demographics
  - Ethnic groups: 97.53% Vietnamese Other minorities: 1.01% Hoa; 0.76% Chơ Ro; 0.23% Khmer; 0.20% Chăm; 0.14% Tày; 0.33% others

GDP
  - Total: VND 366.456 trillion US$ 15.250 billion (2023)
- Time zone: UTC+7 (ICT)
- Area codes: 64 (until 16 July 2017); 254 (from 17 June 2017)
- ISO 3166 code: VN-43
- HDI (2022): ▲0.821 (1st)
- Website: baria-vungtau.gov.vn

Bà Rịa–Vũng Tàu (abbreviated as BRVT) is a former coastal province in the Southeast region of Vietnam. It bordered Đồng Nai to the north, Bình Thuận to the northeast and Ho Chi Minh City metropolitan area to the southwest. It also included the Côn Đảo islands, located some distance off Vietnam's southeastern coast. The province existed in two periods: from December 20, 1899 to February 24, 1976 (the period 1899 – 1956 when the province was named Bà Rịa and the period 1956 – 1976 when the province was named Phước Tuy), and from August 12, 1991 to July 1, 2025. On 12 June 2025, Bà Rịa–Vũng Tàu was incorporated into Ho Chi Minh City. The current territory of the province corresponds to the eastern and southern parts of Ho Chi Minh City.

== History ==
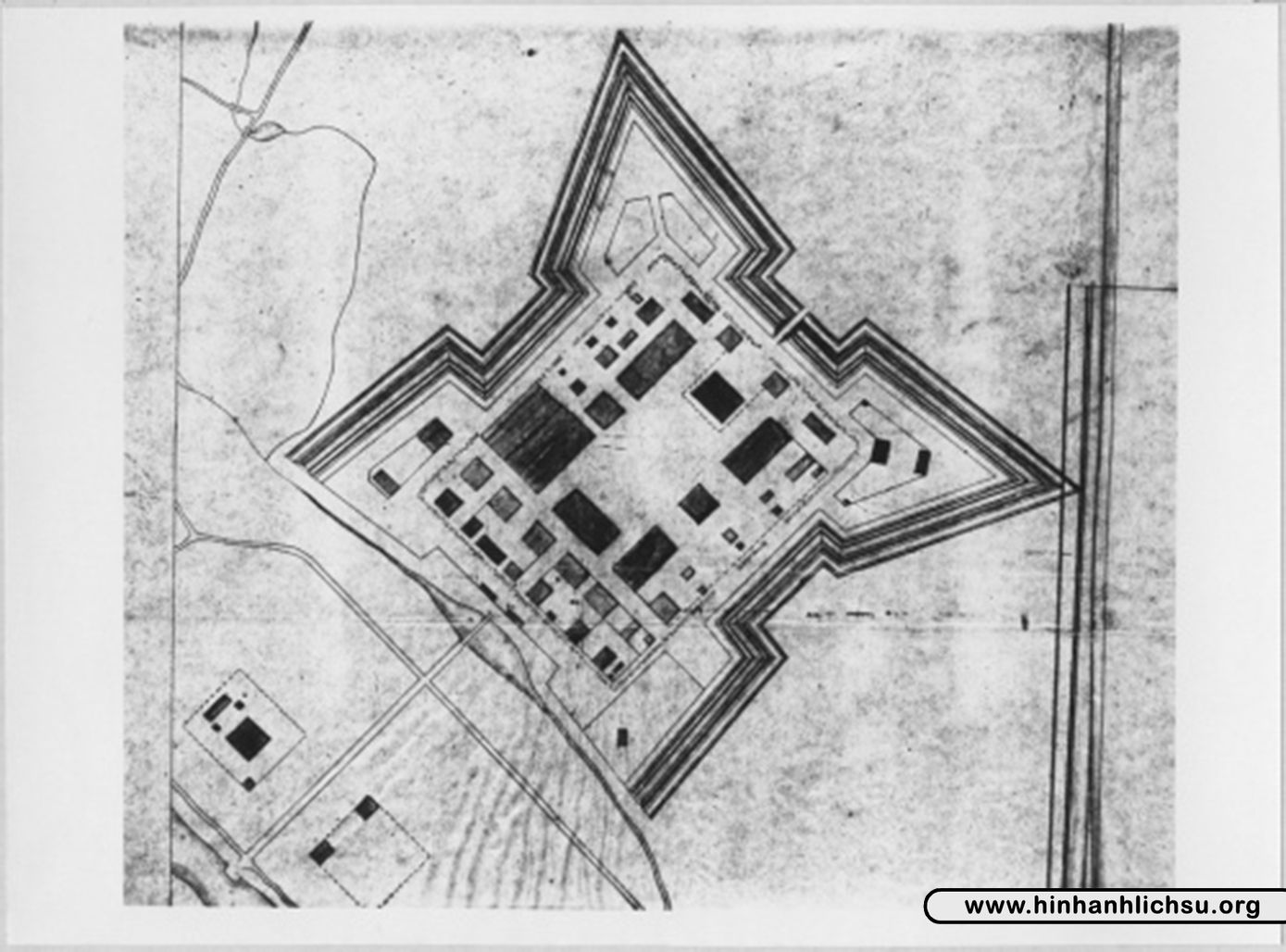
Drawing of Bà Rịa citadel in 1875

With the exception of the Côn Đảo islands, all of Bà Rịa–Vũng Tàu province was the Phước Tuy province after merging Bà Rịa Province and Vũng Tàu Town in the South Vietnam before 1975, including the Spratly Islands was a part of Phước Hải commune, Đất Đỏ district then (now is a townville of Long Đất district). Then once it was a part of Đồng Nai province to the north after the Fall of Saigon.

In 1979, Vũng Tàu was separated from Đồng Nai and merged with the Côn Đảo islands (formerly part of Hậu Giang province), forming the new Vũng Tàu–Côn Đảo "special zone". Later, in 1992, the rest former part of Bà Rịa broke away from Đồng Nai Province, merging with Vũng Tàu–Côn Đảo to form the province of Bà Rịa–Vũng Tàu. On March 1, 2025, Phú Mỹ was officially upgraded from town to city-status. The city consisted of 10 commune-level administrative units, including 7 wards and 3 communes.

On 12 June 2025, as part of major nationwide reforms, Bà Rịa–Vũng Tàu province was dissolved and along with Bình Dương province to be merged into Ho Chi Minh City.

== Climate ==
The province had a tropical monsoon climate with two distinct seasons: a rainy season from May to October, and a dry season from November to April. The average annual temperature is 27 °C (81 °F), ranging from an average monthly temperature of 24.8 °C (76.6 °F) to an average monthly temperature of 28.6 °C (83.5 °F). The province received 2,400 hours of sunshine per year while it receives an annual precipitation of 1,500 mm (59 in).

== Administrative divisions ==
At the time of dissolution, Bà Rịa–Vũng Tàu was subdivided into seven district-level sub-divisions:

- Four districts:
  - Châu Đức
  - Côn Đảo (island district)
  - Long Đất (established from merging Long Điền and Đất Đỏ districts shortly before the dissolutuon)
  - Xuyên Mộc
- Three provincial cities:
  - Bà Rịa (capital)
  - Phú Mỹ (largest city by area)
  - Vũng Tàu (largest city)

They were further subdivided into seven commune-level towns (or townlets), 40 communes, and 30 wards.

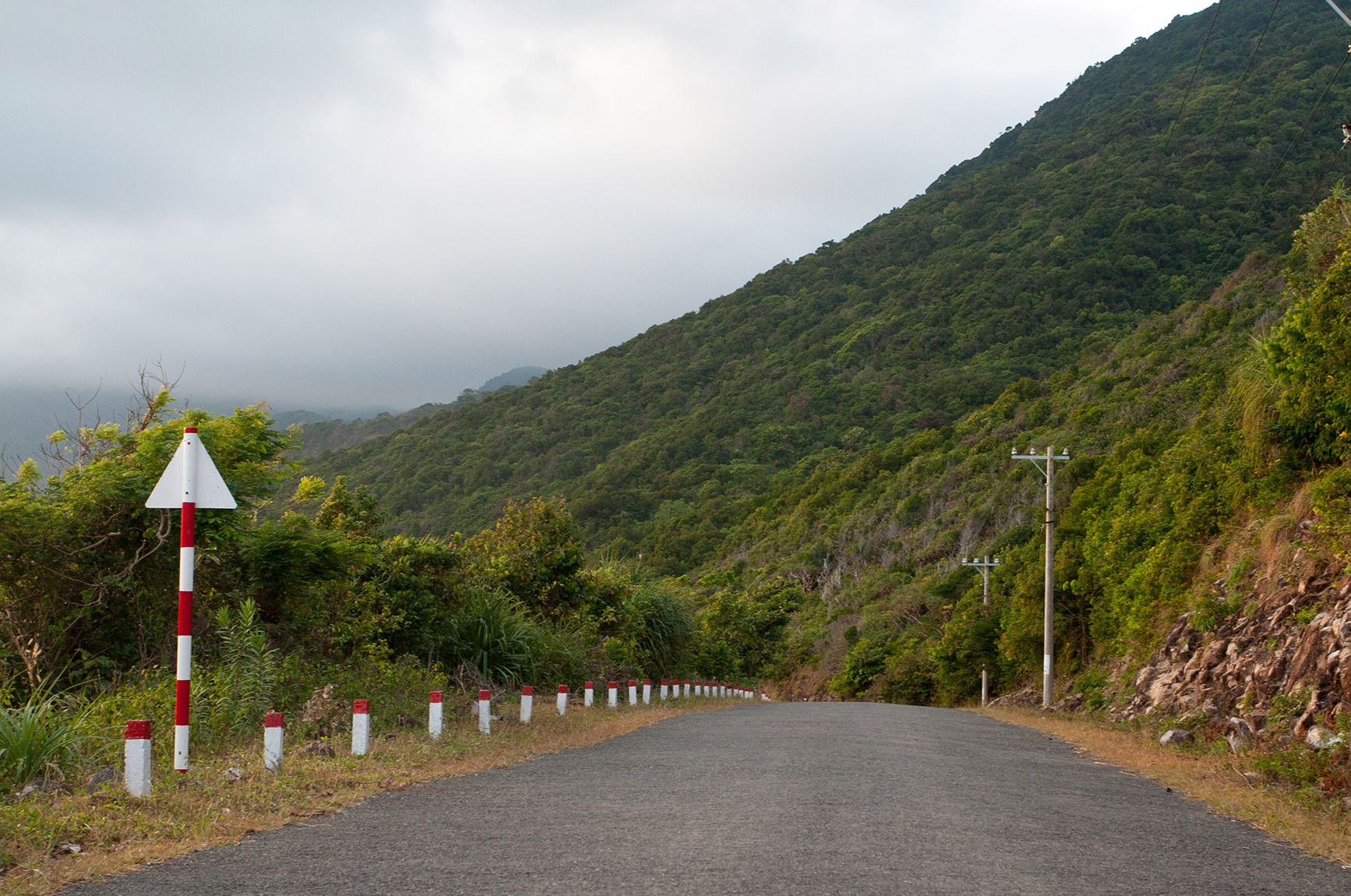
Côn Đảo district

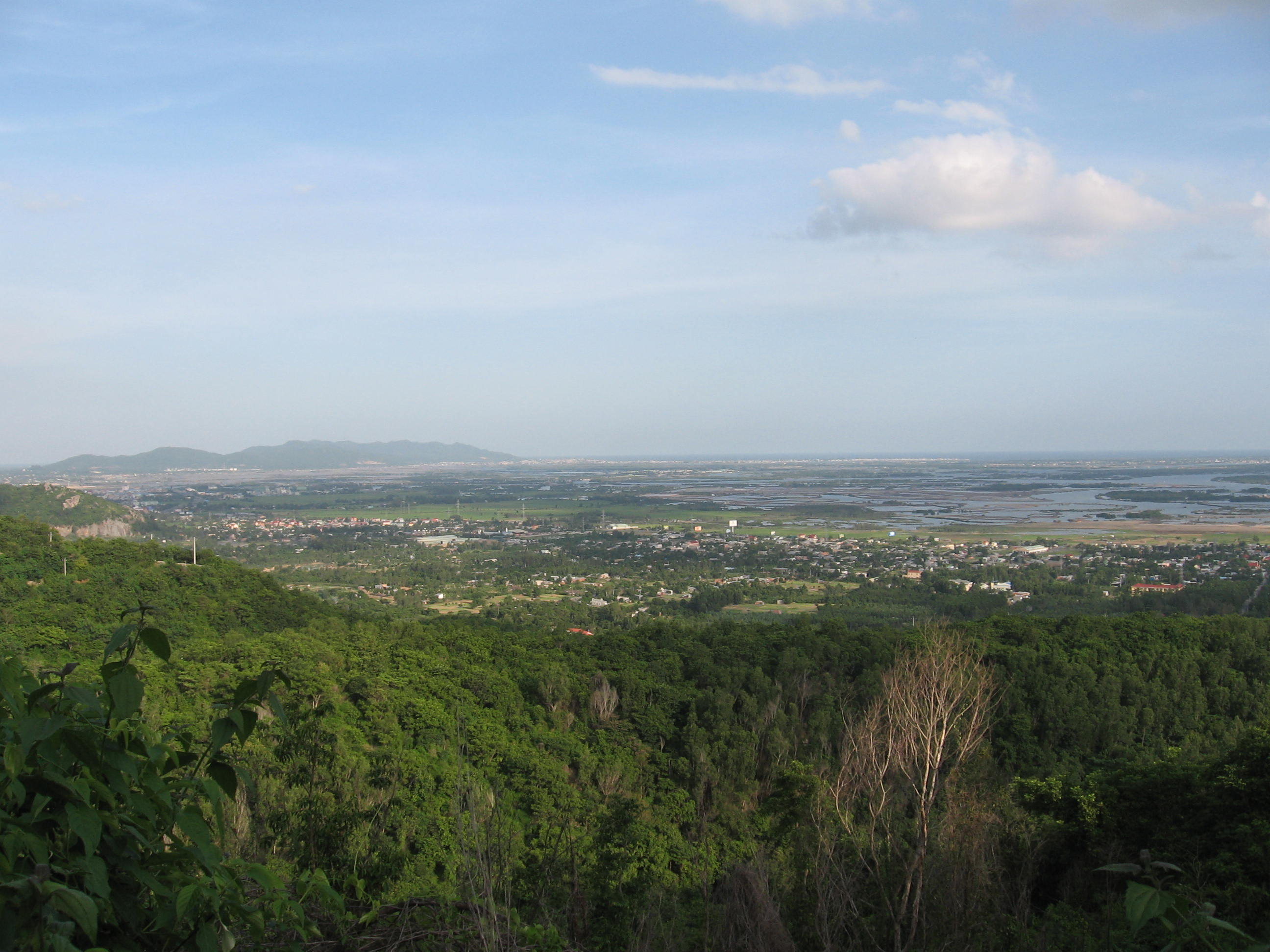
The city of Bà Rịa

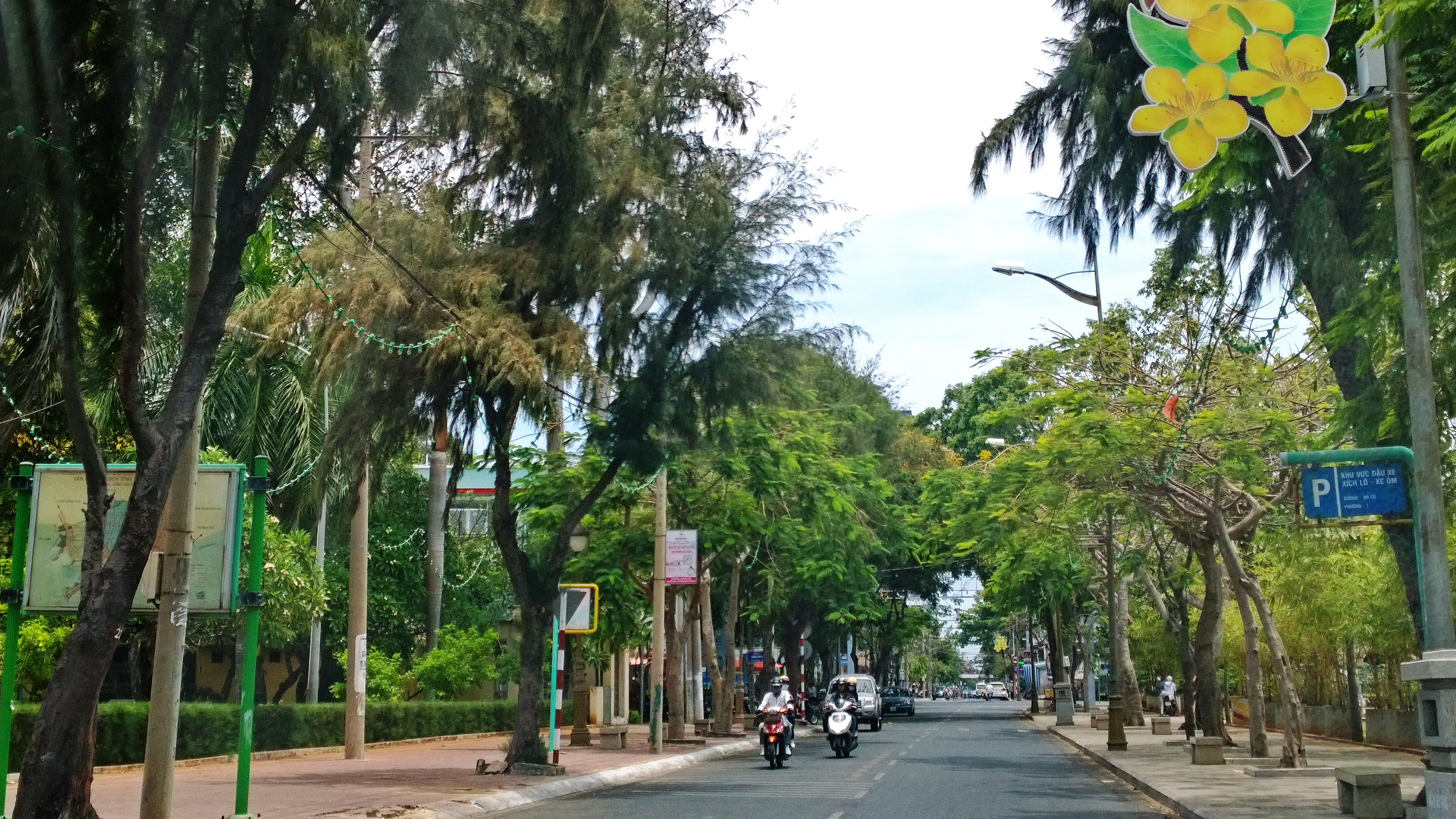
The city of Vũng Tàu

District-level sub-divisions	Bà Rịa City	Vũng Tàu City	Phú Mỹ City	Châu Đức District	Côn Đảo District	Long Đất District	Xuyên Mộc District
Area (km^{2})	91.5	141.1	333.02	422.6	75.79	267.42	640.9
Population	205,192	420,860	287,055	143,306	13,112	241,501	162,356
Density (people/km^{2})	2,243	3,737	861	339	173	903	253
Administrative divisions	7 wards, 3 communes	16 wards, 1 communes	7 wards, 3 communes	2 townlet, 14 communes	not subdivided	4 townlets, 7 communes	1 townlets, 12 communes
Year of establishment	2012	1992	2018	1994	1991	2025	1976
Source: Website of Bà Rịa–Vũng Tàu Province

== Demographics ==
History of developing population
Year	Population
1995	708,900
1996	730,400
1997	752,700
1998	775,600
1999	805,100
2000	829,900
2001	858,000
2002	880,800
2003	899,100
2004	918,900
2005	938,800
2006	955,700
2007	970,200
2008	983,600
2009	998,500
2010	1,012,000
2011	1,027,200
2017	1,098,794
2019	1,148,313

According to 2015 statistics from the General Statistics Office of Vietnam, the province had a population of 1,072,600. Urbanization in the province is above the country's average (50.52%).

== Economy ==
Bà Rịa–Vũng Tàu provincial economic activities included: petroleum (the most important), electricity at the Phú Mỹ Power Plants and Bà Rịa Power Plant (accounting for approx. 40% of the country's total power capacity), petrochemicals: Phú Mỹ Urea Plant (800,000 metric tonnes per year), polyethylene (100,000 metric tonnes per year), steel production, and cement production. Tourism, commerce and fishing were also important economic activities of the province. Bà Rịa–Vũng Tàu contributed greatly to the country's budget. In 2005, it accounted for around 24 percent of Vietnam's budget (42,000 billion dong) of a total of 180,000 billion dong (exchange rate is 16,000 dong/dollar), ranking second, after Ho Chi Minh City before Hanoi (28,000 billion dong in 2005). The provincial GDP per capita ranked second to none in the country, over $4,000, if excluding petroleum GDP, it is over $2,000 (Hồ Chí Minh City ranks second with this index $1,850). In terms of living standards, Bà Rịa–Vũng Tàu ranked third, behind Hồ Chí Minh City and Hanoi.

Bà Rịa–Vũng Tàu was also one of the leading direct foreign investment (FDI) attractions of Vietnam, in the top five of FDI acquisition provinces of Vietnam. In tourism, there were some big projects licensed or to be licensed soon: Saigon Atlantis resort (capitalized US$300 million), Vũng Tàu Aquarium and Bàu Trũng entertainment park ($500), and Xuyên Mộc safari ($200).

On Vietnam's Provincial Competitiveness Index 2023, a key tool for evaluating the business environment in Vietnam’s provinces, Ba Ria-Vung Tau received a score of 69.57. This was a slight decrease from 2022 in which the province received a score of 70.26. In 2023, the province received its highest scores on the ‘law and order’ and ‘informal charges’ criteria and lowest on ‘business support policy’ and ‘labour policy’.

== Tourism ==
Vũng Tàu is an important tourist destination, being particularly well known for its beaches, for its colonial-era architecture, and the Christ of Vũng Tàu, a large statue built by Vietnam's Catholic minority. It was completed in 1974, with the height of 32 metres and two outstretched arms spanning 18.4 metres. It is among the tallest statues of Christ in Asia. Among the most famous tourist destinations are the existing very popular and crowded beaches of Vũng Tàu and Long Hải and the new up and coming destinations of Hồ Tràm and Hồ Cốc located further along the South Sea coast. The main media agency in the province is the Bà Rịa–Vũng Tàu Daily Newspaper.

Determining tourism as one of the pillars of local socio-economic development, in early 2017, Bà Rịa–Vũng Tàu province decided to re-establish the Tourism Department. By the end of the year, the Bà Rịa–Vũng Tàu Provincial Party Committee had issued a resolution on developing high-quality tourism, which aimed to develop the tourism infrastructure and improve the quality of tourism products and services in the direction of modernity and difference, while ensuring a safe, civilized and friendly tourist environment. According to Trịnh Hàng, Director of the Tourism Department of Bà Rịa–Vũng Tàu province, since its establishment, the Tourism Department has advised the Provincial People's Committee on many plans such as the census of tourist accommodation establishments throughout the province, the plan on enhancing the management of tourist destinations, the plan on regulations to select tourism establishments with the title "Meeting the standards for tourist service", the plan on regulations to manage the beaches, and completing the master plan on tourist development of Bà Rịa–Vũng Tàu province by 2025, with a vision to 2030. With the efforts of the provincial tourism industry and local authorities, the image of Bà Rịa–Vũng Tàu tourism has created a positive impression for visitors. Many other visitors to Vũng Tàu at this time have also been impressed by the changes in the destination. Vũng Tàu tourism is very much regaining its prestige and class.

== Infrastructure ==
Bà Rịa–Vũng Tàu serves as a major trade gateway for Vietnam due to its proximity to industrial zones, port complex, major highways, and transshipment routes. Infrastructure investments in the province have not only increased connectivity within the province but also with neighboring economic hubs such as Ho Chi Minh City and Đồng Nai province.

=== Ports ===
Bà Rịa–Vũng Tàu is a major gateway for international shipments in Southeast Asia, due to the Cái Mép–Thị Vải port complex. The port system ranks among the major ports in the region and one of only 19 in the world capable of handling 190,000 deadweight tonnage (DWT) vessels.

Container ships from this port complex are capable of transporting goods to Europe as well as North America. In addition, the province is also around 70 km from Ho Chi Minh City's Cát Lái port, the busiest port in the city before the expansion of the city.

The government is also planning to increase investments in the development of terminals and road infrastructure to increase connectivity, efficiency, and port capacity.

=== Airports ===
The Tân Sơn Nhất International Airport in Ho Chi Minh City is less than 90 km from the province and around 70 km from the Cái Mép–Thị Vải port complex.

In addition, the new Long Thành International Airport which is under construction is only around 30 minutes from the port complex and 50 km from the province.

=== Highways ===
The province has access to major national highways such as National Highway 51 and National Highway 1. In addition, expressways such as Ho Chi Minh City – Long Thành – Dầu Giây Expressway, Biên Hòa–Vũng Tàu Expressway, Bến Lức – Long Thành Expressway (HCMC Ring Road 3; to open in 2026), and the upcoming HCMC Ring Road 4 further increase connectivity with the surrounding provinces.

Within the province, the connectivity between ports or industrial zones with the national roadway systems is supported by numerous regional highways, port roads, and industrial zone roads.

=== Railway ===
A rapid transit connects with the province's cities are Bà Rịa, Vũng Tàu and Phú Mỹ with Long Thành International Airport was planned.

=== Industrial zones ===
As of August 2018, there are 15 industrial parks in BRVT, including nine which are operational with an average occupancy rate of 47 per cent. There are currently 339 projects in local industrial parks, including 162 foreign and 177 domestic projects.

The locality is also home to two industrial parks that specialize in supporting industries, Phú Mỹ 3 and Đá Bạc.

== International relations ==
=== Sister cities ===
There were nine sister cities/regions of Bà Rịa–Vũng Tàu province:

City/region	Since
(South Korea) South Jeolla	12 May 1997
Rostov Oblast, Russia	28 February 2000
Sverdlovsk Oblast, Russia	9 September 2000
Ansan, South Korea	17 August 2004
Northern Territory, Australia	19 September 2007
Nova Scotia, Canada	30 November 2009
Pohang, South Korea	9 March 2010
Nenets Autonomous Okrug, Russia	31 October 2010
Kawasaki, Kanagawa, Japan	15 September 2012

== Festivals ==
- Nghinh Co Festival at Dinh Cố Shrine (12th day of the second lunar month)
- Sea Festival

The fair in this festival will also showcase products and promote cooperation between businesses in industry, agriculture, trade and services in the province and neighboring provinces. Several seminars and workshops on trade and tourism promotion, as well as environmental protection, will be organised

- International Kite Festival (held annually since 2009 in Vũng Tàu City)

== Gallery ==
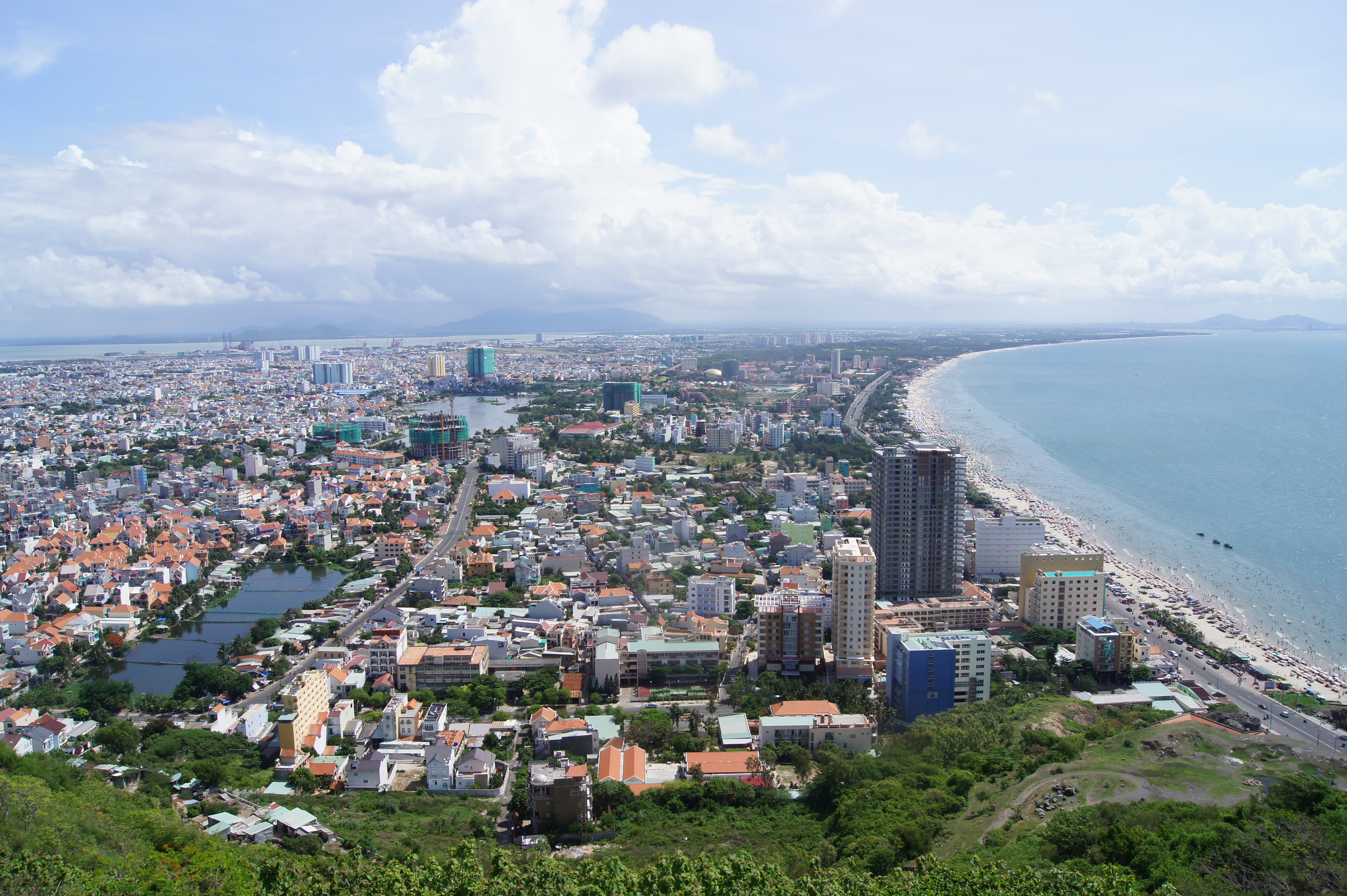
Vũng Tàu, the province's largest city

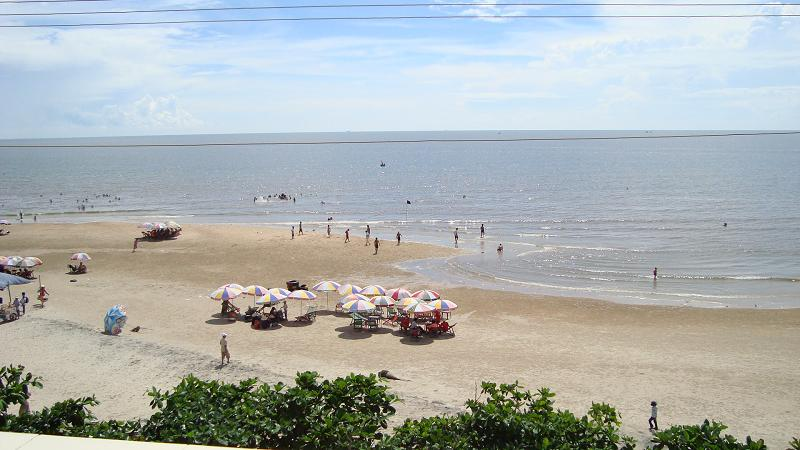
Long Hải Beach, a small beach town next to Vũng Tàu also attracts tourists

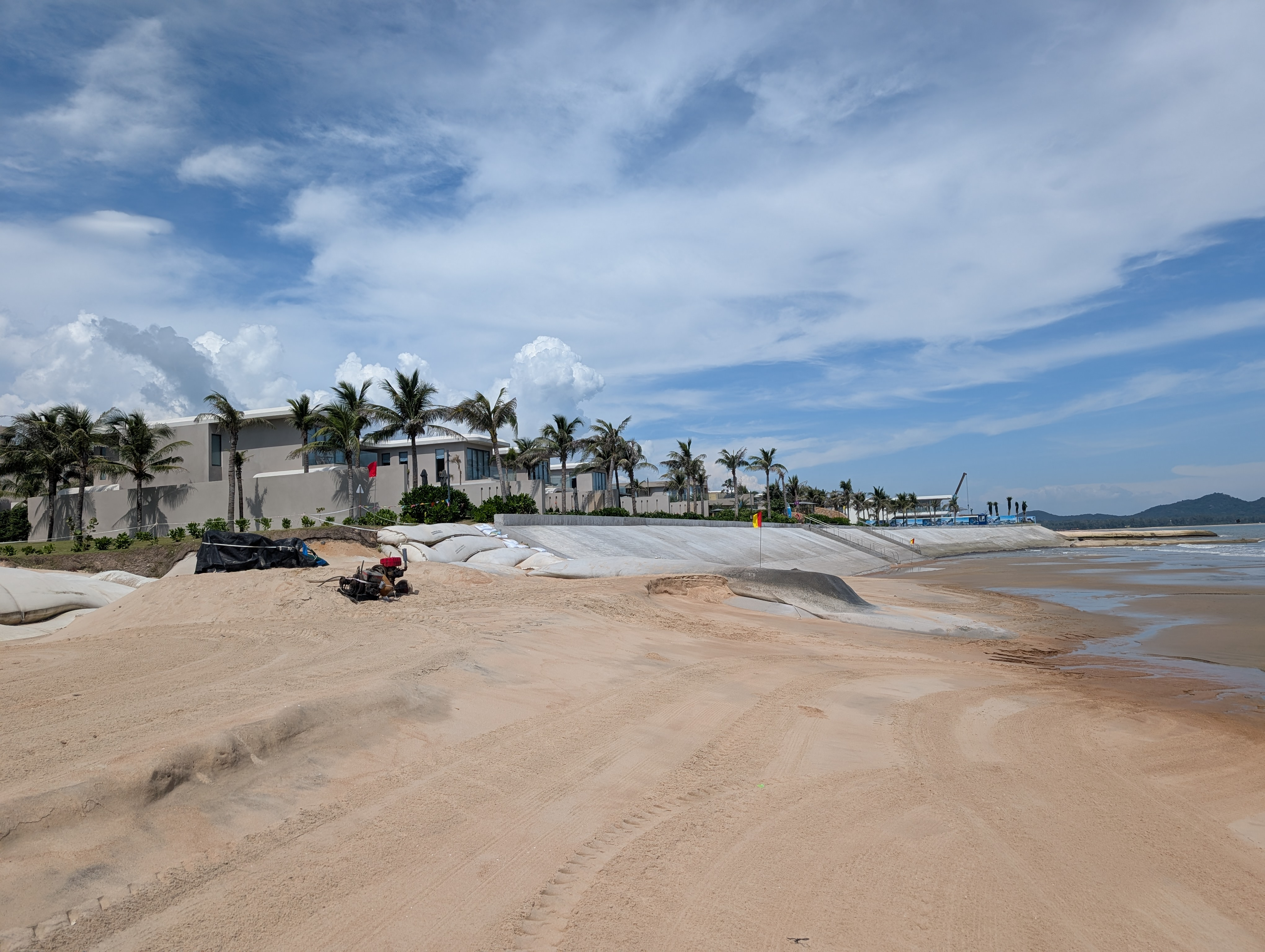
Hồ Tràm, the "resort capital" of the province

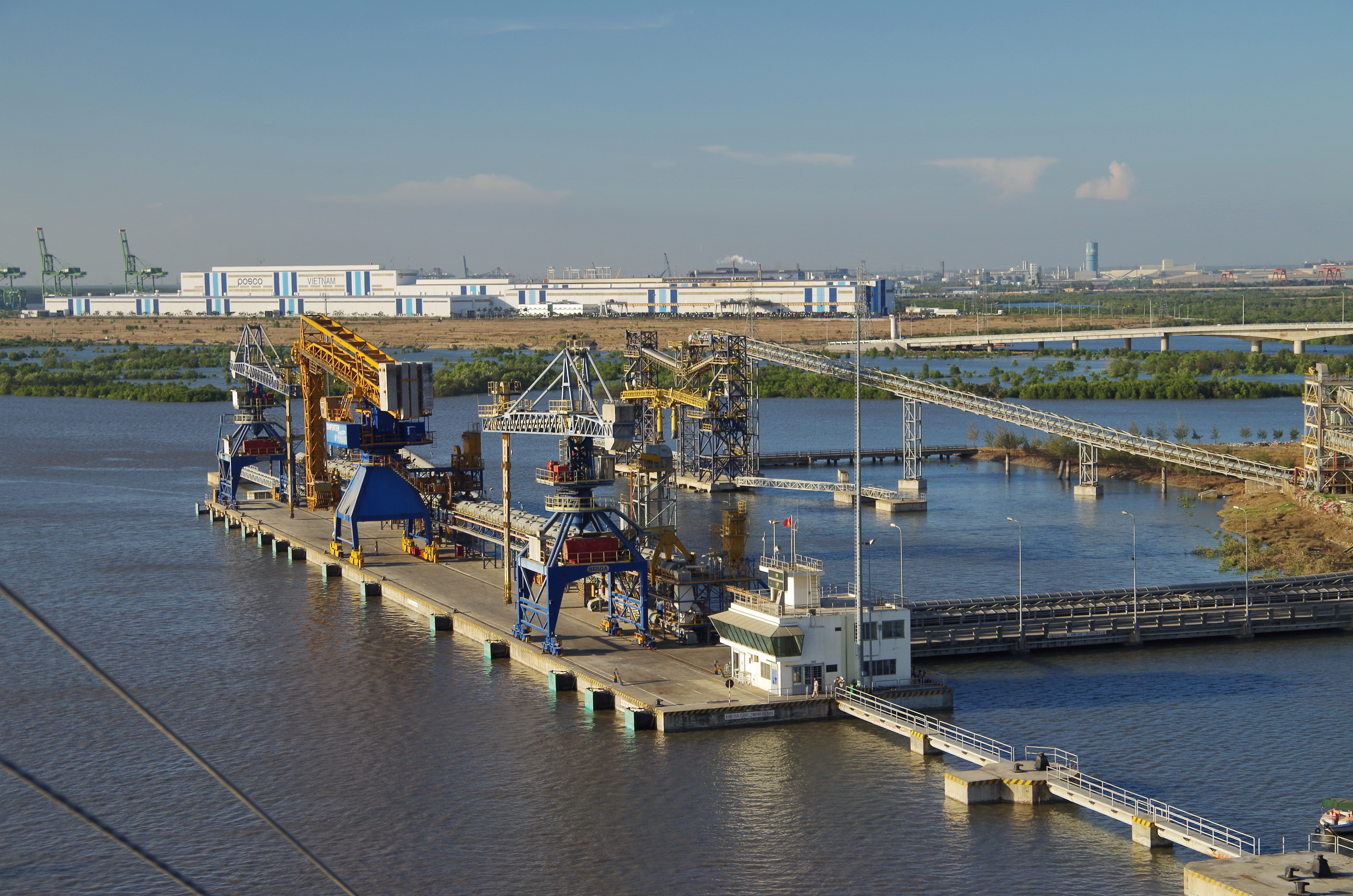
Port in Phú Mỹ, the province's industrial town

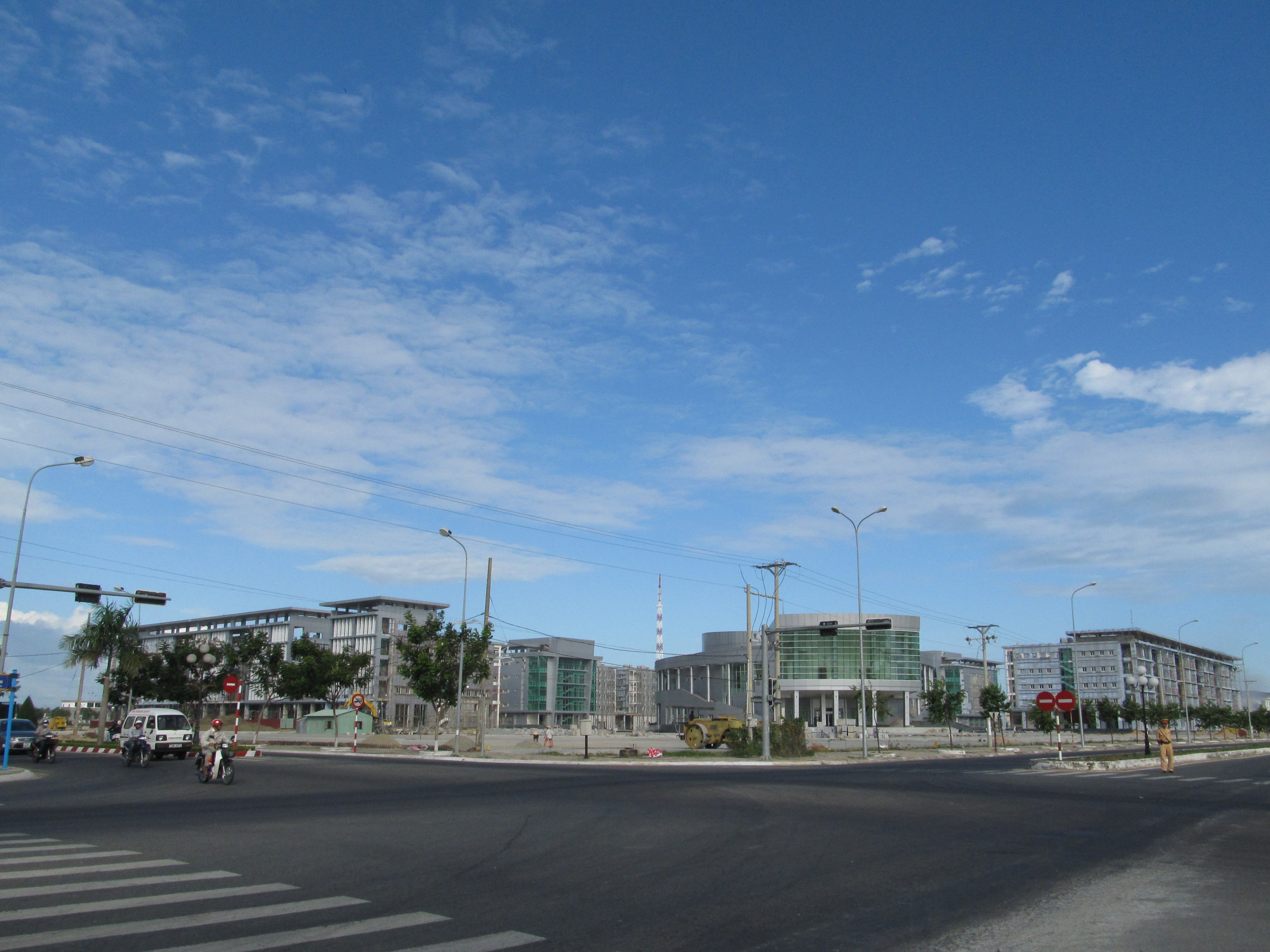
Bà Rịa, the province's capital and administration centre
