= Ho Chi Minh City Airport =

Ho Chi Minh City Airport may refer to:

- Tan Son Nhat International Airport, the primary international airport within the city
- Long Thanh International Airport, a new airport for HCMC currently under construction and scheduled to open in 2026
