= Thống Nhất district =

Coordinates: 10.917°N 107.083°E

Thống Nhất district Huyện Thống Nhất
- District
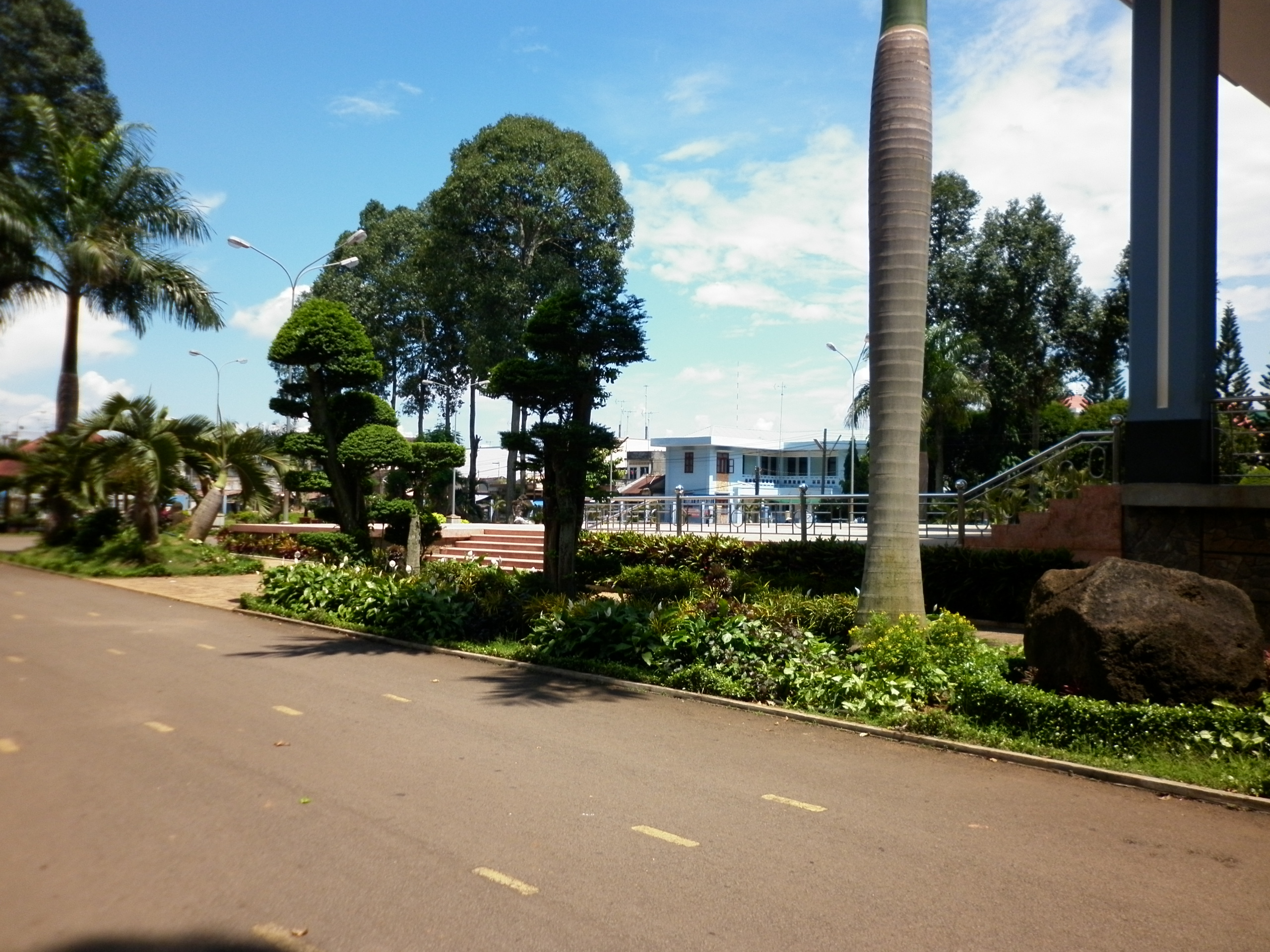
- View from the side of the church

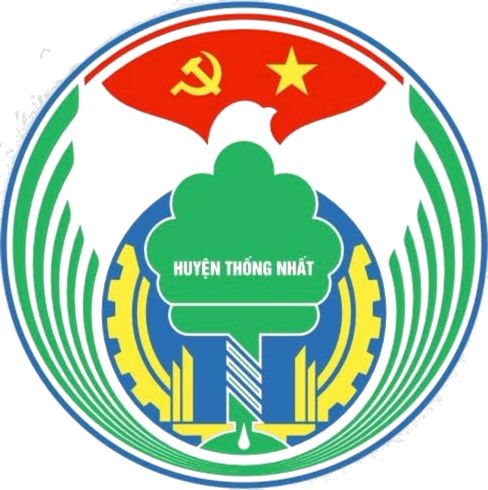
- Seal
- Interactive map of Thống Nhất district
- Country: Vietnam
- Region: Southeast
- Province: Đồng Nai
- Capital: Dầu Giây

Area
  - Total: 95 sq mi (247 km^{2})

Population (2019)
  - Total: 165,280
- Time zone: UTC+7 (Indochina Time)
- Website: thongnhat.dongnai.gov.vn/Pages/home.aspx

Thống Nhất was a rural district of Đồng Nai province (now Đồng Nai municipality) in the Southeast region of Vietnam. As of 2003, the district had a population of 146,112. The district covers an area of 247 km^{2}. The district capital lies at Dầu Giây.

== Administrative divisions ==
Thống Nhất is divided into one township, Dầu Giây, and ten communes: Bàu Hàm 2, Gia Kiệm, Gia Tân 1, Gia Tân 2, Gia Tân 3, Hưng Lộc, Lộ 25, Quang Trung, Xuân Thạnh and Xuân Thiện.
