= Long Thành, Đồng Nai =

Long Thành Phường Long Thành
- Ward
- Location in Vietnam
- Coordinates: 10°52′N 106°55′E
- Country: Vietnam
- Municipality: Đồng Nai

Area
  - Total: 3.53 sq mi (9.15 km^{2})

Population (2009)
  - Total: 27,084
  - Density: 7,670/sq mi (2,960/km^{2})
- Time zone: UTC+07:00 (Indochina Time)

Long Thành is a ward in Đồng Nai, southern Vietnam, 70 km northwest of Vũng Tàu, 20 km southwest of Biên Hòa. The ward is located on the Route 51 that connects industrial Biên Hòa city with the petroleum installation and seaside resort at Vũng Tàu city.

== Facilities ==
This town is adjacent to the planned Long Thanh International Airport. Local economy is based on trading and services for the surrounding rubber and durian farms. In the suburbs of the town, there are industrial parks and a golf course.

== Planned developments ==
When Ho Chi Minh City – Long Thanh – Dau Day Expressway is completed, this town will become a component city of the Ho Chi Minh City Metropolitan Area. Then the city's economy will be based on services for Long Thanh International Airport. There is a plan to relocate the Đồng Nai administration offices from Biên Hòa city to this town.
