= Bà Rịa–Vũng Tàu Daily News =

Bà Rịa–Vũng Tàu Daily News (Vietnamese: Báo Bà Rịa Vũng tàu điện tử) is a news agency in Bà Rịa–Vũng Tàu province, Vietnam. As an official newspaper in Bà Rịa–Vũng Tàu, the newspaper gives easy access to various topics, such as economy, culture, and life in the province.

== Timeline ==
- April 1980: Vũng Tàu–Côn Đảo Newspaper (currently Bà Rịa–Vũng Tàu Newspaper) was launched after the foundation of Vũng Tàu–Côn Đảo special zone (currently Bà Rịa–Vũng Tàu province)
- September 10, 1980: The first issue was published with four pages.
- 2004: Bà Rịa–Vũng Tàu Newspaper is issued daily with 12 pages and launched its online version at http://www.baobariavungtau.com.vn.
