= Bien Hoa–Vung Tau Expressway =

Road in Vietnam

CT.28 Expressway
- Bien Hoa–Vung Tau Expressway
- Đường cao tốc Biên Hoà - Vũng Tàu
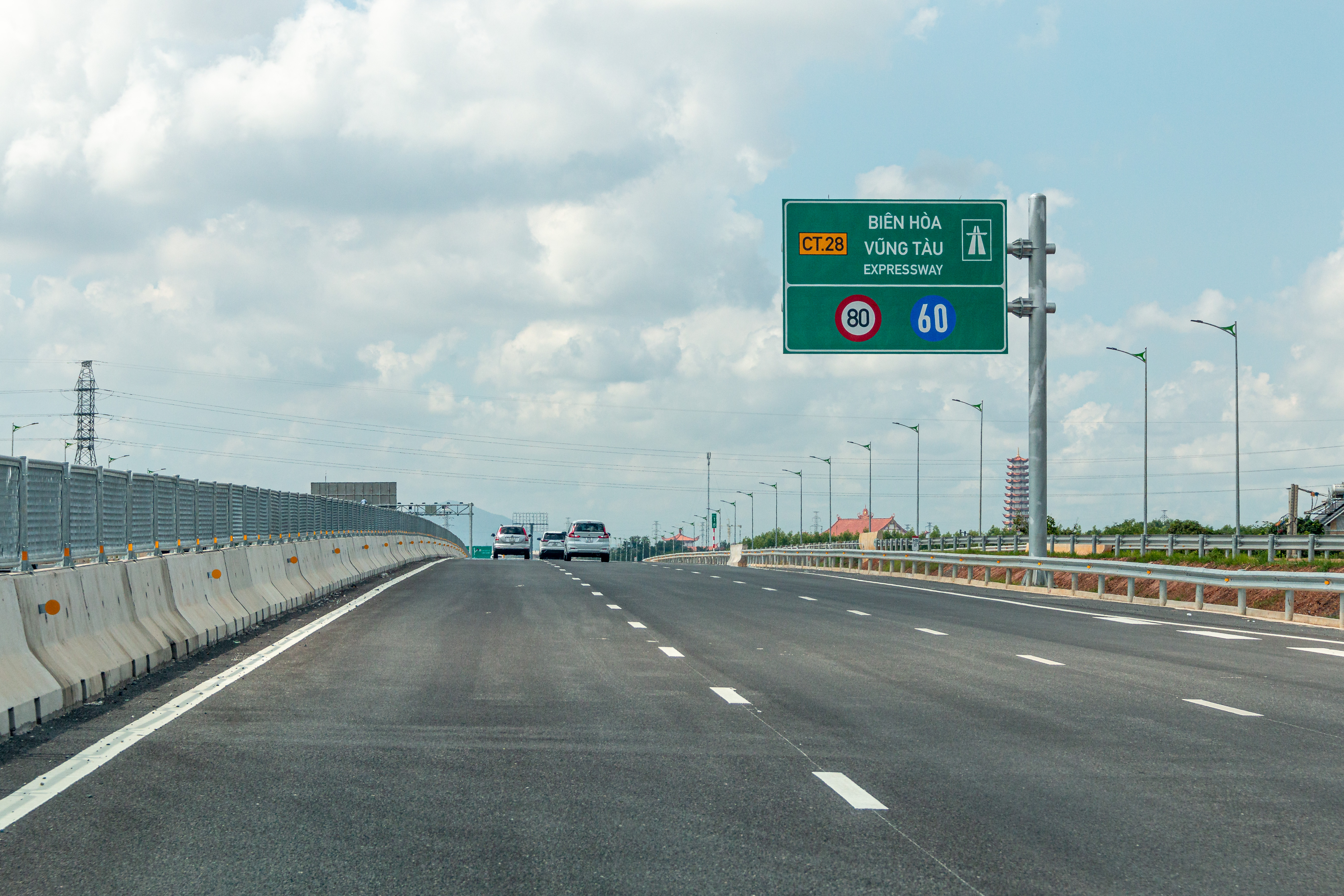
- Bien Hoa–Vung Tau Expressway

Route information
- Part of (Long Thành - Tân Hiệp)
- Length: 53.7 km (33.4 mi)

Major junctions
- North end: Võ Nguyên Giáp Street at Biên Hòa, Đồng Nai Province
- North end: at Vung Tau, Ba Ria Vung Tau

Location
- Country: Vietnam
- Provinces: Đồng Nai, Bà Rịa–Vũng Tàu
- Counties: Long Thành district
- Major cities: Biên Hòa, Phú Mỹ, Bà Rịa, Vũng Tàu

Highway system
- Transport in Vietnam

The Bien Hoa–Vung Tau Expressway (Vietnamese: Đường cao tốc Biên Hòa–Vũng Tàu) (CT.28) is an under construction expressway in the Southeast region of Vietnam. With a total length of 77.6 km, this expressway when completed is expected to connect the south side of Đồng Nai province with Bà Rịa–Vũng Tàu province. The design speed is 100 km/h and the road will have 4 lanes.

According to the project proposal investment report of the Transport Design Consultancy Corporation (TEDI), the expressway is 77.6 km long. Of which, the expressway section is 66 km long, the urban road part is about 2.8 km, and the part of scale II is about 8.8 km. Of these, the section Bien Hoa - Phu My (expressway) is 38 km long; section of Phu My - coastal road of Ho Chi Minh City. Vung Tau (expressway) is 28 km long; from the coastal road of the Vung Tau City to National Route 51C is 2.8 km long and the section connecting Phu My - National Road 51 (to Cai Mep - Thi Vai port) is 8.8 km long.

== Development ==
The route yet to be built has been divided into two sections by the Ministry of Transport. The proposed route will be east of highway 51.

Bien Hoa-Phu My

This section will be 46.8 km long. Investment cost is estimated at 14,956 billion VND. This section will be constructed first.

Phu My-Vung Tau

This section will be 31 km long.

== Interchange list ==
IC No.	Name	Location			Dist. from Origin	Connection	Go to	Notes
IC No.	Name	City/Province	District/Town	Commune/Ward/Town	Dist. from Origin	Connection	Go to	Notes
1	Biên Hoà	Đồng Nai	Biên Hòa	Phước Tân	0	National Route 1 (Vo Nguyen Giap road)	Trảng Bom, Vĩnh An, Biên Hòa, Dong Nai Bridge (to Bình Dương, Hồ Chí Minh City)	Start the expressway
2	Long Thành	Đồng Nai	Long Thành	Long An	16+800			
3	Long Phước	Đồng Nai	Long Thành	Long Phước		Provincial roads 310B	Nhơn Trạch, Long Thành International Airport	
4	Tân Hiệp	Đồng Nai	Long Thành	Phước Bình	29+600			
5	Phú Mỹ	Bà Rịa–Vũng Tàu	Phú Mỹ	Tóc Tiên	39			
6	Châu Pha	Bà Rịa–Vũng Tàu	Phú Mỹ	Tóc Tiên		Hội Bài - Châu Pha road		
7	National Route 56	Bà Rịa–Vũng Tàu	Bà Rịa	Hòa Long	53+710	QL.56		End the expressway
8	Vũng Vằn	Bà Rịa–Vũng Tàu	Long Điền	Long Điền Town	59+100	QL.55		Under construction
9	Ông Từ	Bà Rịa–Vũng Tàu	Vũng Tàu	Ward 12	68+800	Phước Thắng - Phướcc Tỉnh coastal road		Under construction
