= Tam Phước, Đồng Nai =

Tam Phước
- Ward
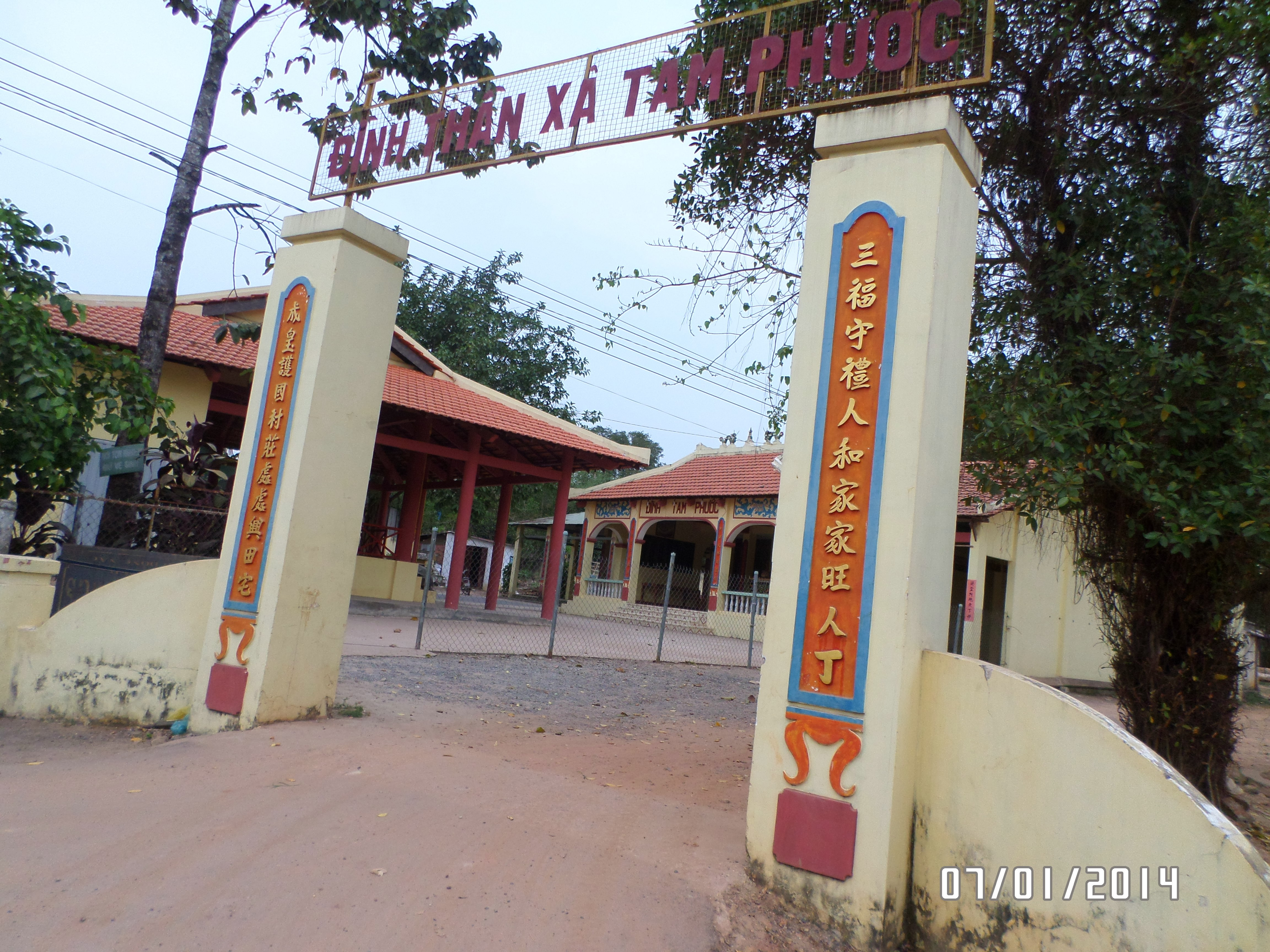
- Tam Phước, Biên Hòa

- Location in Vietnam
- Coordinates: 10°51′44″N 106°55′14″E
- Country: Vietnam
- Municipality: Đồng Nai

Area
  - Total: 17.4 sq mi (45.1 km^{2})

Population (2018)
  - Total: 53,731
- Time zone: UTC+7 (UTC+7)

Tam Phước is a ward located in Đồng Nai, Vietnam. It has an area of about 45.1km2 and the population in 2018 was 53,731.

It is the largest ward in Biên Hòa city by area.
