= Long Đức =

- Ward
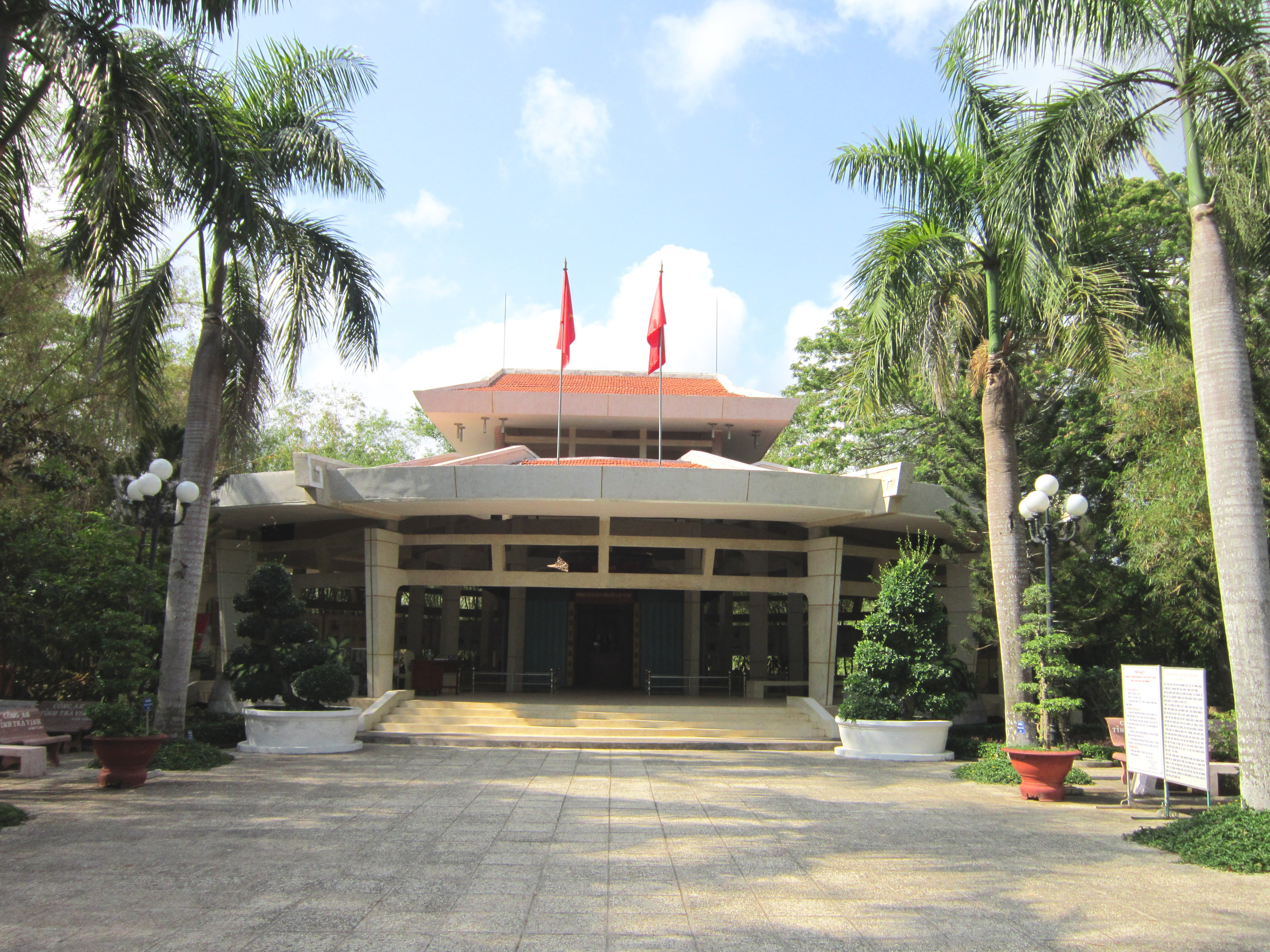
- President Ho Chi Minh Temple
- Interactive map of Long Đức
- Coordinates: 9°58′54″N 106°20′42″E
- Country: Vietnam
- Province: Vĩnh Long
- Region: Mekong Delta
- Established: 1 July 2025
- Seat: No. 62, 30/4 Street, Khóm Vĩnh Hội

Area
  - Total: 40.62 km^{2} (15.68 sq mi)

Population (31 December 2024)
  - Total: 33,662
  - Density: 828/km^{2} (2,140/sq mi)
- Website: longduc.vinhlong.gov.vn

Long Đức is a ward in Vĩnh Long province, Vietnam.

== History ==
On 11 March 1977, the Government Council issued Decision No. 59-CP on the merger and adjustment of the boundaries of several districts in Cửu Long province. Under the decision, Long Đức commune, formerly in the dissolved Châu Thành Đông district, was placed under the administration of Trà Vinh town.

On 4 March 2010, the Government issued Resolution No. 11/NQ-CP on the establishment of Trà Vinh city in Trà Vinh province. Long Đức commune subsequently became part of Trà Vinh city.

On 16 June 2025, the Standing Committee of the National Assembly of Vietnam adopted Resolution No. 1687/NQ-UBTVQH15 on the reorganization of commune-level administrative units in Vĩnh Long province in 2025. Under the resolution, the entire area and population of Ward 4 and Long Đức commune in the former Trà Vinh city were consolidated to form a new ward named Long Đức.
