= Tân Phú, Ho Chi Minh City =

Tân Phú Phường Tân Phú Phú Thọ Hòa, Hòa Thạnh
- Ward
- Interactive map of Tân Phú
- Coordinates: 10°46′34″N 106°38′28″E
- Country: Vietnam
- Municipality: Ho Chi Minh City
- Established: June 16, 2025

Area
  - Total: 0.97 sq mi (2.52 km^{2})

Population (2024)
  - Total: 93,117
  - Density: 95,700/sq mi (37,000/km^{2})
- Time zone: UTC+07:00 (Indochina Time)
- Administrative code: 27031

Tân Phú (Vietnamese: Phường Tân Phú) is a ward of Ho Chi Minh City, Vietnam. It is one of the 168 new wards, communes and special zones of the city following the reorganization in 2025.

== History ==
On June 16, 2025, the National Assembly Standing Committee issued Resolution No. 1685/NQ-UBTVQH15 on the arrangement of commune-level administrative units of Ho Chi Minh City in 2025 (effective from June 16, 2025). Accordingly, the entire land area and population of Phú Trung, Hòa Thạnh wards and part of Tân Thới Hòa, Tân Thành wards of the former Tân Phú district will be integrated into a new ward named Tân Phú (Clause 65, Article 1).
