= Nhơn Trạch, Đồng Nai =

Nhơn Trạch Phường Nhơn Trạch
- Ward
- Nhơn Trạch ward
- Location within Vietnam
- Coordinates: 10°44′22″N 106°56′43″E
- Country: Vietnam
- Region: Southeast
- Municipality: Đồng Nai
- Time zone: UTC+7 (UTC + 7)

Nhơn Trạch is a ward (phường) of Đồng Nai, Vietnam.
