= AH17 =

Road in Vietnam

Asian Highway 17
- Map of AH17 in red

Route information
- Length: 980 km (610 mi)

Major junctions
- North end: Da Nang, Vietnam
- South end: Vũng Tàu, Vietnam

Location
- Countries: Vietnam

Highway system
- Asian Highway Network
← AH16	→ AH18

Asian Highway 17 (AH17) is a road in the Asian Highway Network that runs entirely in Vietnam. The route starts in Da Nang, follows the National Roads 14B, 14, 13, 51 and ends in Vũng Tàu.

In the future, (Tuý Loan - Chơn Thành), (Chơn Thành - Thuận An) and will include AH17, overriding National Roads 13, 14, 14B and 51.
