= Dầu Giây =

Dầu Giây Phường Dầu Giây
- Ward
- Dầu Giây ward
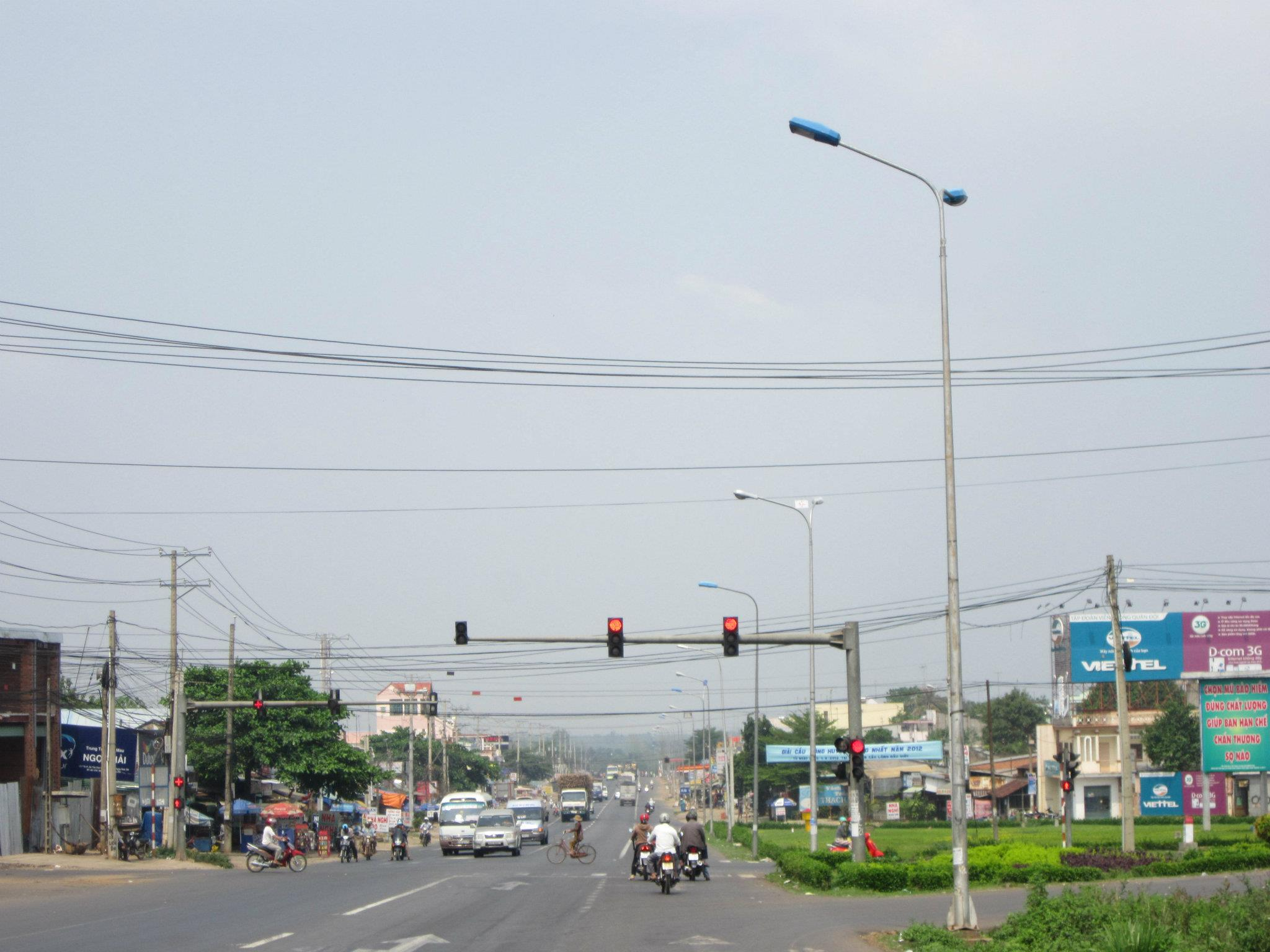

- Location within Vietnam
- Coordinates: 10°56′34″N 107°08′25″E
- Country: Vietnam
- Region: Southeast
- Municipality: Đồng Nai
- Time zone: UTC+7 (UTC + 7)

Dầu Giây is a ward (phường) of Đồng Nai, Vietnam.
