= Southeast (Vietnam) =

Most highly urbanized part of the Southeast Asian country

Coordinates: 10°45′N 106°45′E

Southeast region Đông Nam Bộ
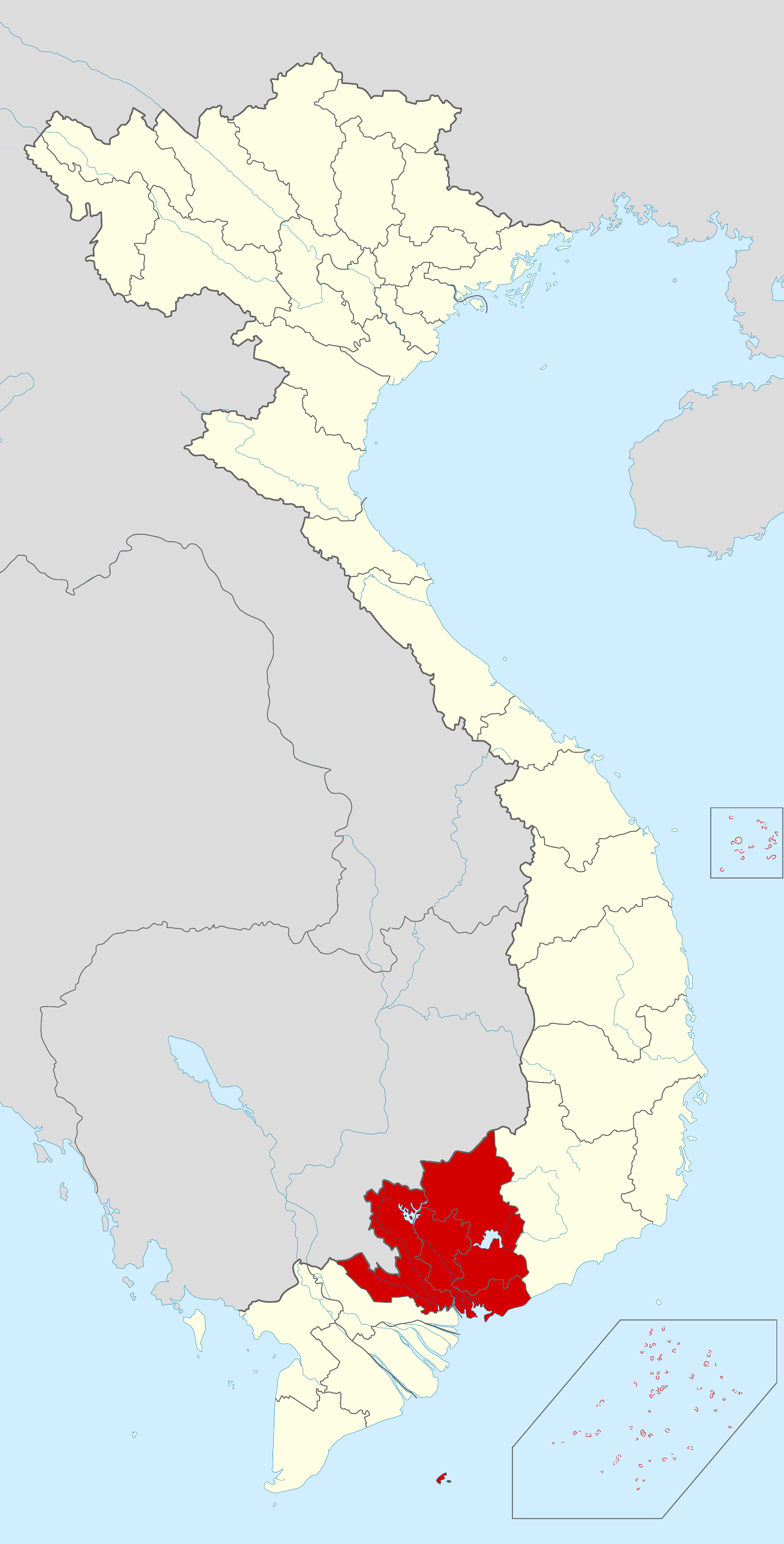
- Map showing location of Đông Nam Bộ (Southeast Vietnam)
- Country: Vietnam

Area
  - Total: 28,046.21 km^{2} (10,828.70 sq mi)

Population (2024)
  - Total: 23,034,068
  - Density: 821.2899/km^{2} (2,127.131/sq mi)

GDP
  - Total: VND 4.423,2 trillion US$ 170.124 billion (2024)
- Time zone: UTC+7 (UTC +7)
- HDI (2023): 0.778 high · 2nd

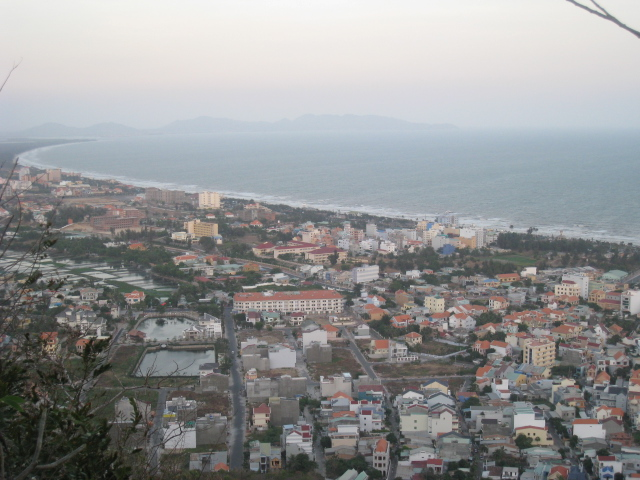
Vũng Tàu city

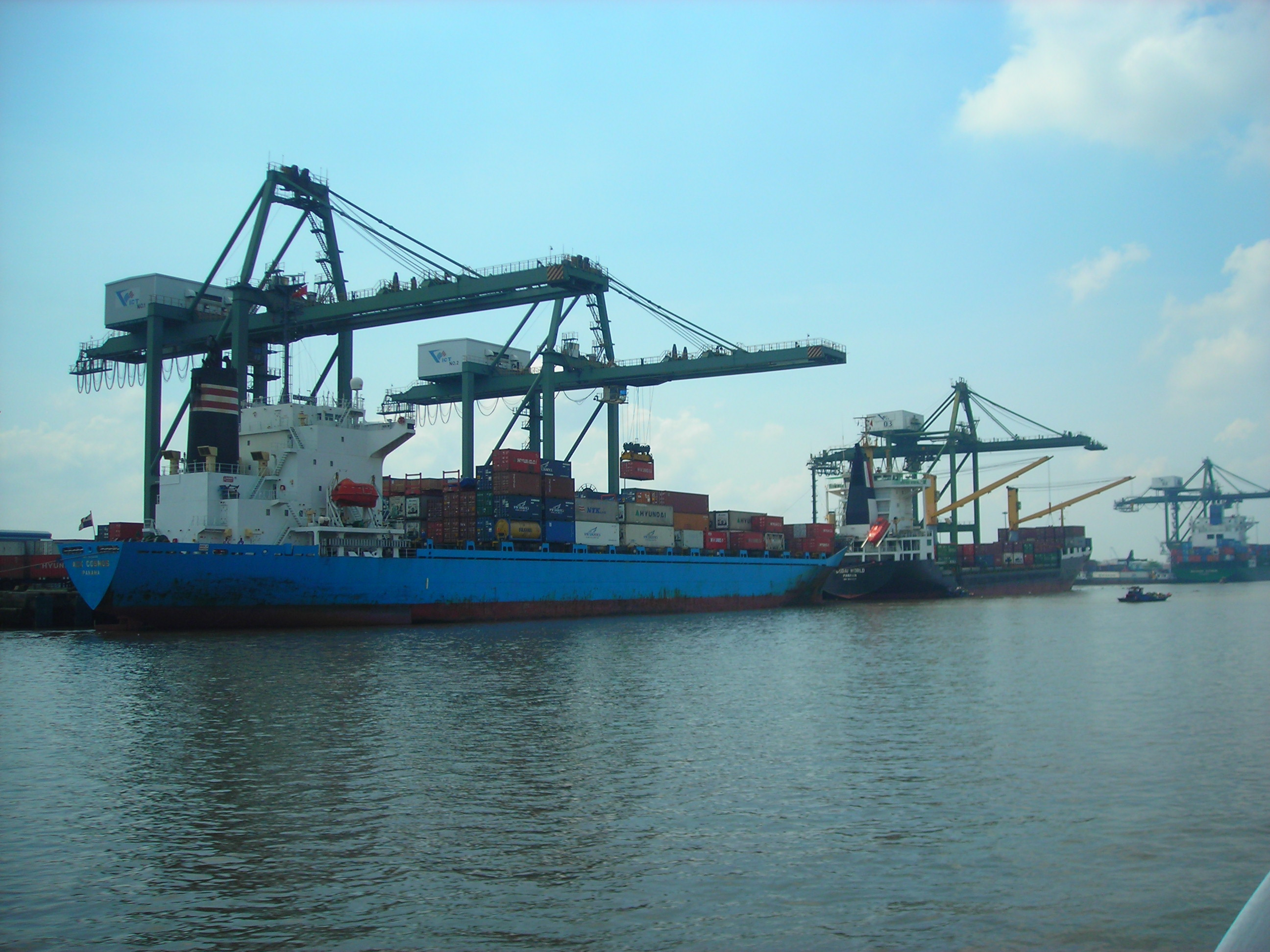
Saigon Port

Đông Nam Bộ (literally "Southeast region") is a region in Southern Vietnam. This region includes two municipality, Ho Chi Minh City, Đồng Nai City and a provinces, Tây Ninh province. This region is the most economically developed region in Vietnam. In 2006, this region contributed 148,000 billion VND (equal to $9.25 billion) out of 251,000 billion VND to the state budget. This region is also the most highly urbanized in the country with more than 50% people living in urban areas (while the equivalent figure for Vietnam is just 25%).

== Administrative divisions ==
The Southeast region comprises 2 municipality and 1 province.

Provincial-level administrative units in the Southeast region of Vietnam.
Province- Level Division	Establish	Capital	Area (km^{2})	Population (2025)	Population density (person/km^{2})
**Hồ Chí Minh**	July 2, 1976	Sài Gòn ward	6,772.59	14,002,598	2067
**Đồng Nai**	April 30, 2026	Trấn Biên ward	12,737.18	4,836,798	379
Tây Ninh	1836	Long An ward	8,536.44	3,254,170	381

Bold: Municipality

== Transport ==
Tan Son Nhat International Airport is the largest airport in Vietnam, with the passenger traffic of 8.5 million in 2006 but it will be replaced by a larger newly constructed airport, Long Thanh International Airport after 2025.

Saigon Port and several deep-water ports in Bà Rịa–Vũng Tàu are the busiest ports in the country. National Route 1, National Route 13, National Route 22, National Route 51, and TransAsia Highway (AH1, AH17) are the principal roads in this region.
