= Long Thanh International Airport =

Future airport to serve Ho Chi Minh City, Vietnam

Long Thanh International Airport Sân bay quốc tế Long Thành Cảng hàng không quốc tế Long Thành

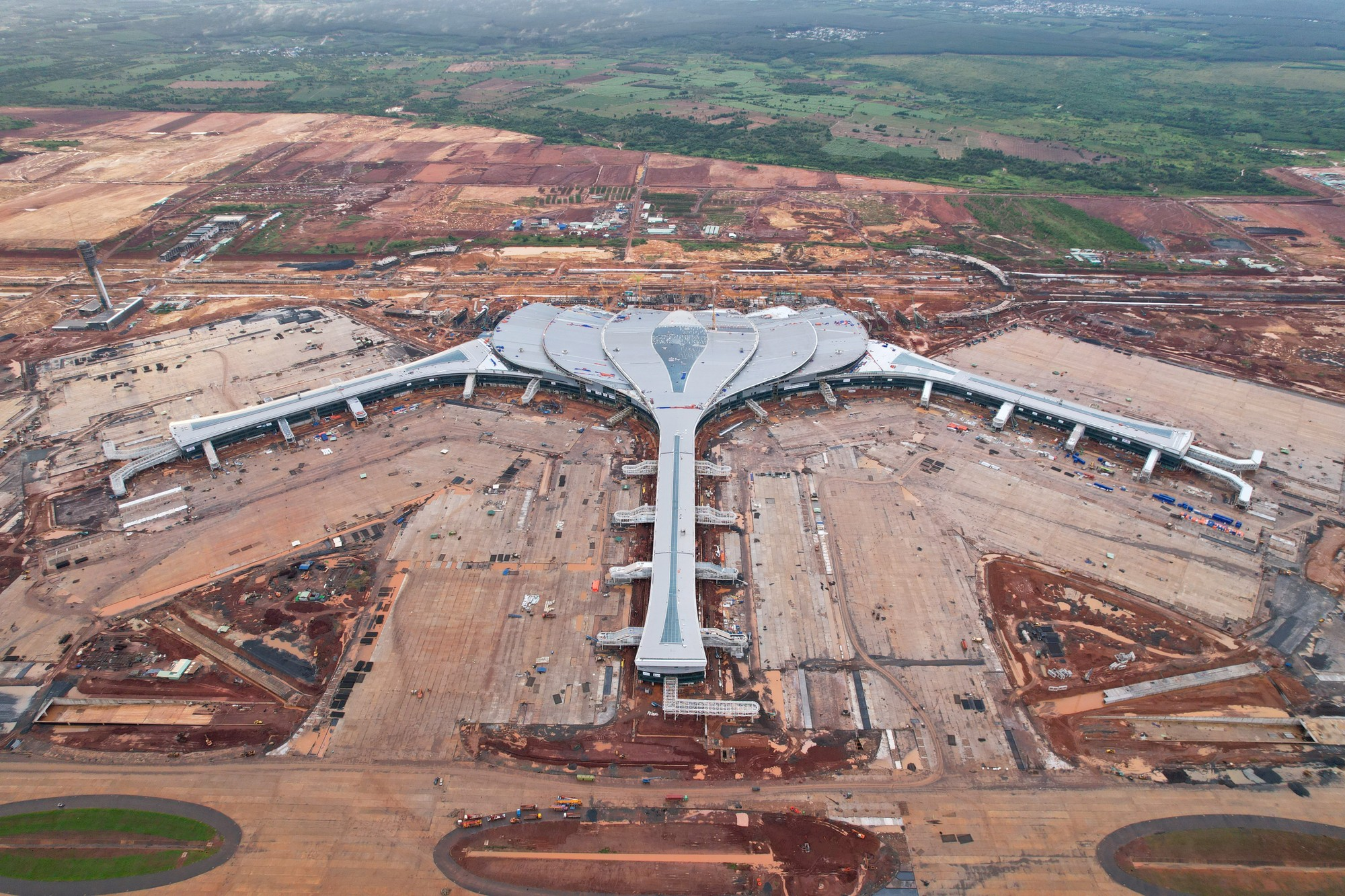
- Long Thanh's T1 just before its technical inauguration on December 2025.
- IATA: LTH; ICAO: VVLT

Summary
- Airport type: Public
- Owner: Government of Vietnam
- Operator: Airports Corporation of Vietnam
- Serves: Ho Chi Minh City metropolitan area
- Location: Long Thành, Đồng Nai, Vietnam
- Opened: Technical: 19 December 2025; 10 months ago; Planned: 1 December 2026; 22 days' time; Official commercial launch: 24 December 2026; 45 days' time
- Hub for: Vietnam Airlines
- Time zone: Time in Vietnam (UTC+07:00)
- Elevation AMSL: 60 m (200 ft)
- Coordinates: 10°47′04″N 107°02′28″E
- Public transit access: Thủ Thiêm-Long Thành Light Rail (planned); North-South Express Railway (planned)

Maps
- Location of airport in Vietnam LTH/VVLT (Southeast Asia) LTH/VVLT (Asia)

Runways
Direction	Length		Surface
Direction	m	ft	Surface
05R/23L	4,000	13,123	Concrete
05L/23R	4,000	13,123	Concrete
- Runway designations Detailed layout plan

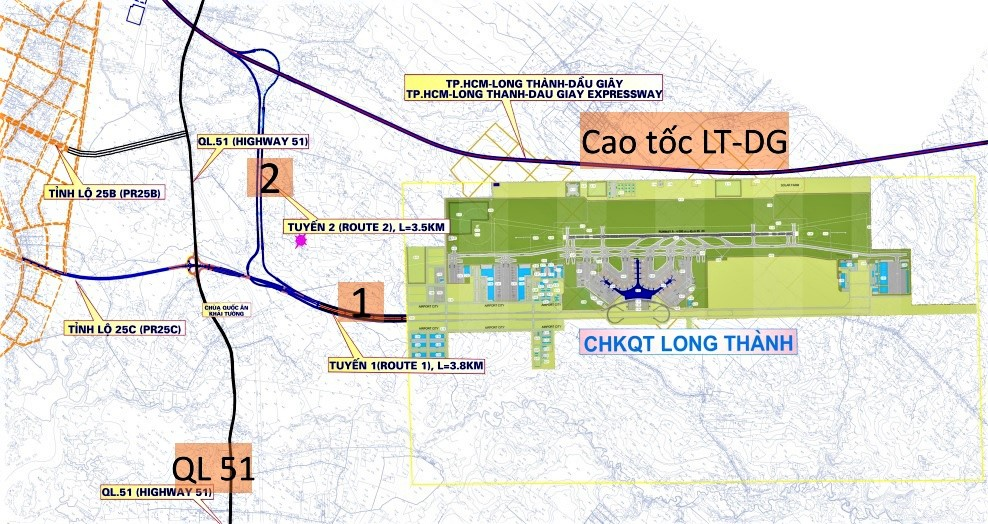
The under-construction Phase 1 with its associated facilities

Long Thanh International Airport (IATA: LTH, ICAO: VVLT) is an international airport under construction in Long Thành ward, Đồng Nai city, Vietnam, approximately 40 km (25 mi) east of Ho Chi Minh City. It will be the second airport to serve the Ho Chi Minh City metropolitan area, after the existing Tan Son Nhat International Airport, which is the busiest airport in Vietnam. It is being built as an alternative to the existing airport in order to relieve its increasing traffic, congestion and demand, as Tân Sơn Nhất could not be further expanded due to being completely surrounded by dense urban growth.

The Government of Vietnam approved its construction on 4 January 2021. Construction began the next day on 5 January, and its first phase was scheduled to be finished by September 2025, but now it is expected to be finished by late 2026.

On 19 December 2025, the airport was inaugurated by the Airports Corporation of Vietnam in a ceremonial "technical opening." The event featured the first flights to land at the airport, including a special charter operated by Vietnam Airlines carrying government leaders, followed by technical flights from Vietjet Air and Bamboo Airways. While these flights carried government officials and technical crews, full commercial operations are scheduled to commence in December 2026.

Long Thành airport has a maximum designed capacity to serve over 100 million passengers and five million tonnes of cargo annually, which would make it the largest airport in both Vietnam and Southeast Asia, and one of the largest in the world. It is the most expensive infrastructure project in Vietnam's history. Once open, both Long Thành and Tân Sơn Nhất airports will continue to operate in tandem. Long Thành will become a new hub for the flag carrier Vietnam Airlines; other Vietnamese airlines such as VietJet Air have also invested in facilities at Long Thành.

The project is being developed in four phases, the first of which cost about US$4.6 billion, with an area of around 5,580 ha (13,800 acres), a capacity of 25 million passengers and 1.2 million tonnes of cargo per year, one terminal and one 4,000 m (13,000 ft)-long and 60 m (200 ft)-wide runway, was officially approved by Prime Minister Nguyễn Xuân Phúc on 11 November 2020. Completion was originally planned in 2025, but has since been delayed to late 2026. The remaining three phases are slated to be fully completed by 2035 at a cost of US$18.7 billion, which will provide another three terminal-runway sets covering an area of more than 10,000 ha (25,000 acres).

== History ==
=== Background ===
The existing Tan Son Nhat International Airport is the only international airport in the Ho Chi Minh City metropolitan area, covering an area of 30,404 square kilometres (11,739 sq mi), that serves an estimated population of around 25 million inhabitants, of which 18-19 million are urban inhabitants, accounting for about 80% of total population. Due to urban growth around it and safety issues, it is difficult to expand to meet the increasing annual growth of passengers. The maximum design capacity of the airport is around 30 million passengers per annum, but in 2023, it handled 40.7 million.

The flow of international tourists to the south of Vietnam is increasing dramatically, by 15 to 20 percent annually. Thus, promoting the domestic market of more than 100 million by building a new airport that can adapt to future needs became necessary. The existing airport will serve the international and domestic flights until the completion of the new Long Thanh International Airport. The airport will be able to handle the world's biggest commercial aircraft types, like the Airbus A380. Under current plans by the Government of Vietnam, the Airports Corporation of Vietnam (ACV) will be the main investor and operator of the airport.

=== Construction ===
The Prime Minister of Vietnam, Nguyễn Tấn Dũng, approved the project in June 2011. Construction works were initially planned under three phases, of which the Phase I consisted two sub-phases, which now increased to three, Phases 1A, 1B and 1C. Under Phase 1A, the construction of the main terminal and one runway was to be done by 2023, allowing the airport to initially serve 17 million passengers a year, which was later increased to 25 million as part of Phase 1C. Then, Vietnam’s National Assembly’s Economic Committee approved the construction of the airport in October 2014. The construction was supposed to begin from 2017, but was delayed due to land acquisition issues and environmental concerns due to its location in a forested area. To rehabilitate the 28,500 residents of the Loc An-Binh Son area, a new settlement near to the airport's site began construction in April 2020, and by December 2020, the mine clearance of the airport site started. On 5 January 2021, construction on the airport officially began, and three days later, on 9 January, while clearing and grubbing, workers found several unexploded mortar shells at the site, which were used during the Vietnam War. On 30 March 2022, construction of the terminal building started. The terminal was scheduled to be completed by September 2025, but was rescheduled to the first half of 2026 in March 2024.

In September 2025, Long Thanh welcomed its first calibration flights, looking forward to become operational by the first half of 2026. On 19 December 2025, the airport was inaugurated by the Airports Corporation of Vietnam in a ceremonial "technical opening." The event featured the first flights to land at the airport, including a special charter operated by Vietnam Airlines carrying government leaders, followed by technical flights from Vietjet Air and Bamboo Airways.

== Funding ==
The total investment on the Long Thanh International Airport is estimated to be US$ 18.7 billion. The project is being developed in four phases. The first phase will cost approximately US$ 7.8 billion, which later changed to about US$ 4.66 billion, whereas the second and third phases are estimated to cost US$ 3.8 billion and US$ 7 billion respectively.

The ACV has invested US$ 235.34 million on the project. The government has borrowed US$ 2.25 billion of official development assistance (ODA) loans for the first phase. The Government funding and ODA loans is being used to build the airport infrastructure, while private funding is being used to build the passenger terminal.

== Master plan ==
The master plan for Long Thanh International Airport was approved by the Prime Minister of Vietnam, Phan Văn Khải, in 2006, and several adjustments have been made over time. The project faced mixed public reaction for its expensive cost and far distance from the center of Ho Chi Minh City.

Based on the demand of transportation, the investment has been divided in three phases, along with a fourth sub-phase. The Southern Airports Corporation, a company under the Ministry of Transport, is in charge of development of this project.

=== Phase 1 (2021–2026) ===
The first phase is estimated to cost US$7.8 billion and is divided into 3 sub-phases.

==== Phase 1A (2021–2023) ====
According to the original plan, the airport would handle 17 million passengers per year after this phase is completed. However, the proposed capacity was later increased to 25 million passengers per year to reduce construction cost. The cost was later changed to about US$4.66 billion. One terminal is being built along with a single runway.

==== Phase 1B (2023–2026) ====
A second runway is being built in this phase, thereby increasing the total capacity to more than 25 million passengers per annum.

==== Phase 1C (2026) ====
The rest of necessary facilities will be built and land-clearance for future phases will be made. With an area of about 5,880 ha (14,500 acres), a capacity of over 25 million passengers and 1.2 million tonnes of cargo per year, the airport will begin operating in the second half of 2026.

=== Phase 2 (2026–2035) ===
An estimated cost of about US$3.8 billion will be invested to double the capacity to 50 million passengers and 1.5 million tonnes of cargo per annum, and two more terminals along with the third runway will be added when the phase is finished, which is scheduled to be in 2030.

=== Phase 3 (After 2035) ===
The airport will reach its maximum designed capacity at 80-100 million passengers and 5 million tonnes of cargo per year. By investing an estimated US$7 billion, the 4th terminal and the 4th runway will be constructed between 2030 and 2035, and will be operational after the 3rd phase, making it the largest and busiest airport in Vietnam, Southeast Asia and among the largest in the world, with an area of more than 10,000 ha (25,000 acres), 4 terminals and runways.

== Terminals ==
All the four terminals, including the under-construction Terminal 1, were designed by a Korea-based architecture firm, Heerim Architects, and are said to be shaped like a lotus flower, the national flower of Vietnam. The design was based on feedback from the Vietnamese public and experts. The terminals will have a floor area of 399,987 m^{2} (4,305,420 sq ft) each, divided over four floors with a capacity of 25 million passengers for each annually.

== Ground transportation ==
=== Road ===
The airport will be accessible via the National Highway 51 and Ho Chi Minh City–Long Thanh–Dau Giay Expressway, construction is expected be completed before the airport opens in 2025. A third road is the CT.01, including segments of: Dau Giay–Phan Thiet Expressway (completed 2023), Bien Hoa–Vung Tau Expressway, Ben Luc – Long Thanh Expressway with some ring roads are Ring Road 3 to be completed by 2026 and Ring Road 4 to be under constructed in the same year.

=== Rail ===
==== Light rail ====
A light rail line connecting the airport to Thủ Thiêm, eastern part of Hồ Chí Minh City and the city's new financial district is proposed. This line was initially planned to be at least 38 km (24 mi) long. In March 2024, it was finalised to run at a length of 37.35 km (23.21 mi), with 20 stations. This includes an 11.8 km (7.3 mi) section passing through Ho Chi Minh City and a 25.55 km (15.88 mi) section through Đồng Nai Province. The Thủ Thiêm Station, in An Khánh, Ho Chi Minh City (Thủ Đức), will serve as the starting station, and the Long Thanh International Airport Station will serve as the last station. The Thủ Thiêm station is also link to Ben Thanh station in Bến Thành, the city central station, by the Hồ Chí Minh City Metro Line 2, in order to provide direct connectivity to the airport through the metro as well. The estimated investment for the project is VNĐ 40.5 trillion (US$1.6 billion). It will be primarily designed for passenger transportation between the city centre and Long Thành International Airport, and will operate at a maximum speed of 80 km/h (50 mph), with an operational speed of 60 km/h (37 mph). The Ministry of Transport aims to invest in the railway project by 2025, with construction scheduled for 2025-2030.

==== High-speed rail ====
A new high-speed railway service is proposed to be connected to the new airport as part of the Ho Chi Minh City–Nha Trang section of the North-South high-speed railway line. The airport planners have suggested to build the high-speed railway line by keeping a station at the airport, as it will give passengers a more direct and efficient transit option to Ho Chi Minh City than by road, which is already congested closer to the city centre. The project is overseen by the Transportation Design and Engineering Corporation (TEDI). The station will be positioned 220 m in front of and towards the Terminal 1 of the airport, and will be situated 35 m away from the Terminal 1 parking area, according to the proposed feasibility study. Upon operation, the railway station will be linked by a pedestrian bridge connecting Terminal 1, the parking area, and the railway station.

== Environmental concerns ==
As the airport is being built on a forested area, various concerns have been raised by environmentalists regarding the location, and called for change in the location to a plain area. However, ACV states that a change in the location would cause the airport to be located too far from the Ho Chi Minh City metropolitan area, leading to inefficiency and further traffic, congestion and pollution on roads while travelling to and from the city centre. Therefore, the ACV has pledged to ensure adequate greenery in the airport premises to compensate for the lost green cover during construction.

During construction, the ACV has been criticised by farmers and residents living in Dong Nai Province, where the airport is situated in Long Thanh District, due to inadequate measures to protect the environment and impact on agriculture and settlements from pollution. Airport construction works have generated enormous quantities of red dust, which causes significant disease in cereal crops, like on wheat, barley and species of trees like rambutan, durian, mangosteen, lychee and others like and jackfruit and banana cultivated and grown in the province. This has led to a dramatic decline in the production of many crops and produces, especially wheat, which has provoked opposition from farmers and agriculturists against the project.

On 5 April 2023, an inspection team of the Ministry of Natural Resources and Environment announced their inspection results of compliance with environmental protection laws by the ACV during the construction of the airport. The inspection found that the construction process has caused red dust to spread far and wide, affecting many communes and towns in Long Thanh District and Dong Nai Province. The dust was due to the ACV's failure to adequately water certain locations, as specified in the approved environmental impact assessment report. The team requested the ACV to water the transportation routes, especially the paths used by construction vehicles, more frequently, install speed limit signs, and strictly control the use of uncovered soil transport vehicles. They must also tightly pack the filled areas and surplus excavation landfills to reduce the red dust caused by winds. Since then, although the ACV has implemented a system to sprinkle water in the entire site to reduce dust, it has yet to find out a solution to eliminate pollution from the construction units to fully bring pollution under control.

== See also ==
- Tan Son Nhat International Airport
- Transport in Vietnam
- List of airports in Vietnam
