= Nghĩa Thành =

Nghĩa Thành Xã Nghĩa Thành
- Commune
- Interactive map of Nghĩa Thành
- Coordinates: 10°34′12″N 107°11′41″E
- Country: Vietnam
- Municipality: Ho Chi Minh City
- Established: June 16, 2025

Area
  - Total: 25.36 sq mi (65.67 km^{2})

Population (2024)
  - Total: 27,819
  - Density: 1,097/sq mi (423.6/km^{2})
- Time zone: UTC+07:00 (Indochina Time)
- Administrative code: 26617

Nghĩa Thành (Vietnamese: Xã Nghĩa Thành) is a commune of Ho Chi Minh City, Vietnam. It is one of the 168 new wards, communes and special zones of the city following the reorganization in 2025.

== Geography ==
Nghĩa Thành is located in the east of Ho Chi Minh City, roughly 10 kilometers north of Bà Rịa and about 80 kilometers southeast of Saigon ward. It is bordered by:

- Xuân Sơn commune to the east,
- Long Hương ward and Châu Pha commune to the west,
- Tam Long ward and Đất Đỏ commune to the south,
- Ngãi Giao and Bình Giã communes to the north.

According to Official Dispatch No. 2896/BNV-CQĐP dated May 27, 2025 of the Ministry of Home Affairs, following the merger, Nghĩa Thành has a land area of 65.67 km², the population as of December 31, 2024 is 27,819 people, the population density is 423 people/km².

== History ==
On June 16, 2025, the National Assembly Standing Committee issued Resolution No. 1685/NQ-UBTVQH15 on the arrangement of commune-level administrative units of Ho Chi Minh City in 2025 (effective from June 16, 2025). Accordingly, the entire land area and population of Đá Bạc and Nghĩa Thành communes of the former Châu Đức district will be integrated into a new commune named Nghĩa Thành (Clause 153, Article 1).
