= Bà Rịa (city) =

Former provincial city and capital of the former Bà Rịa – Vũng Tàu province, Vietnam

Bà Rịa Thành phố Bà Rịa Long Lễ
- Provincial city (Class-2)
- Bà Rịa City
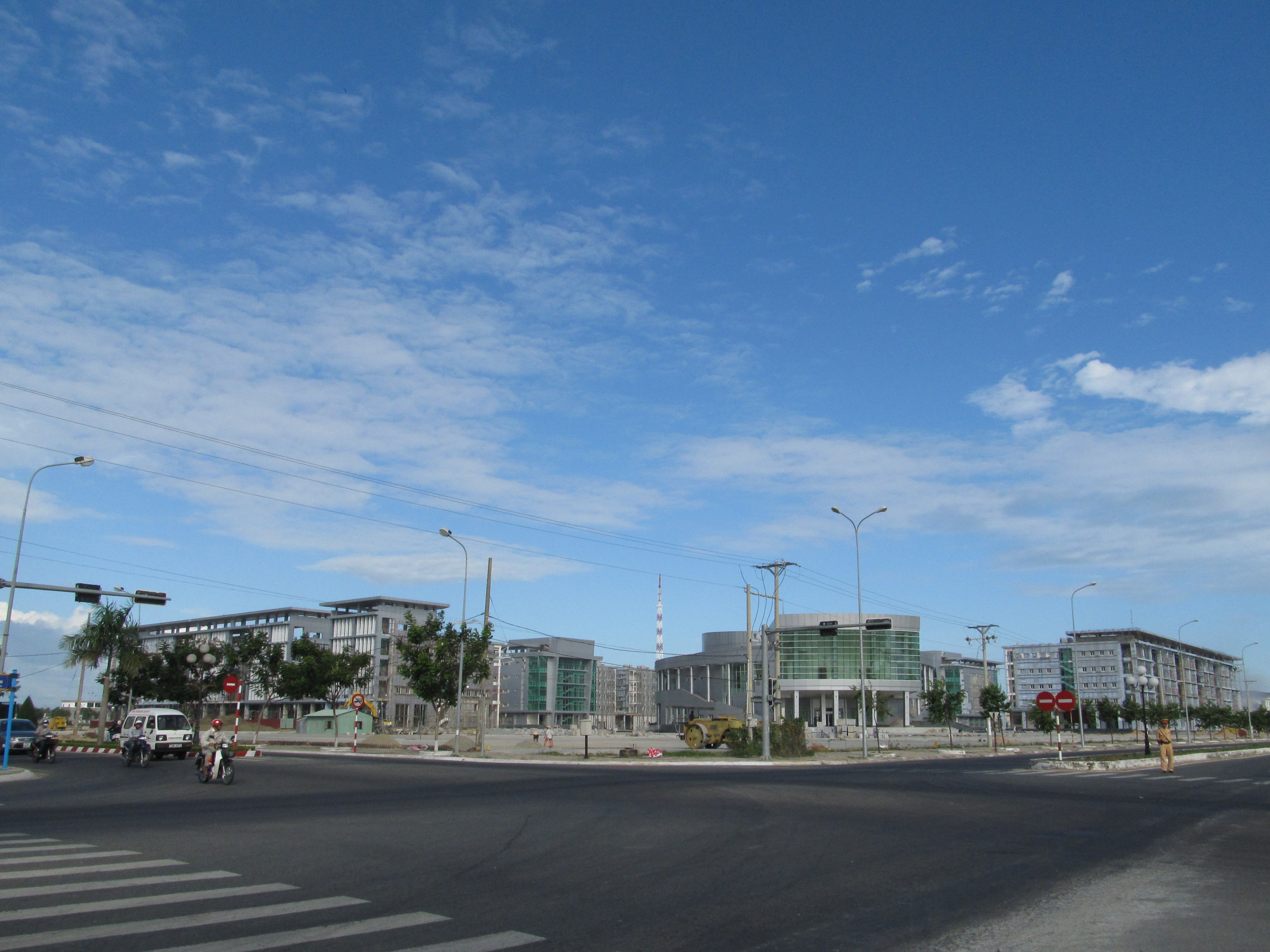
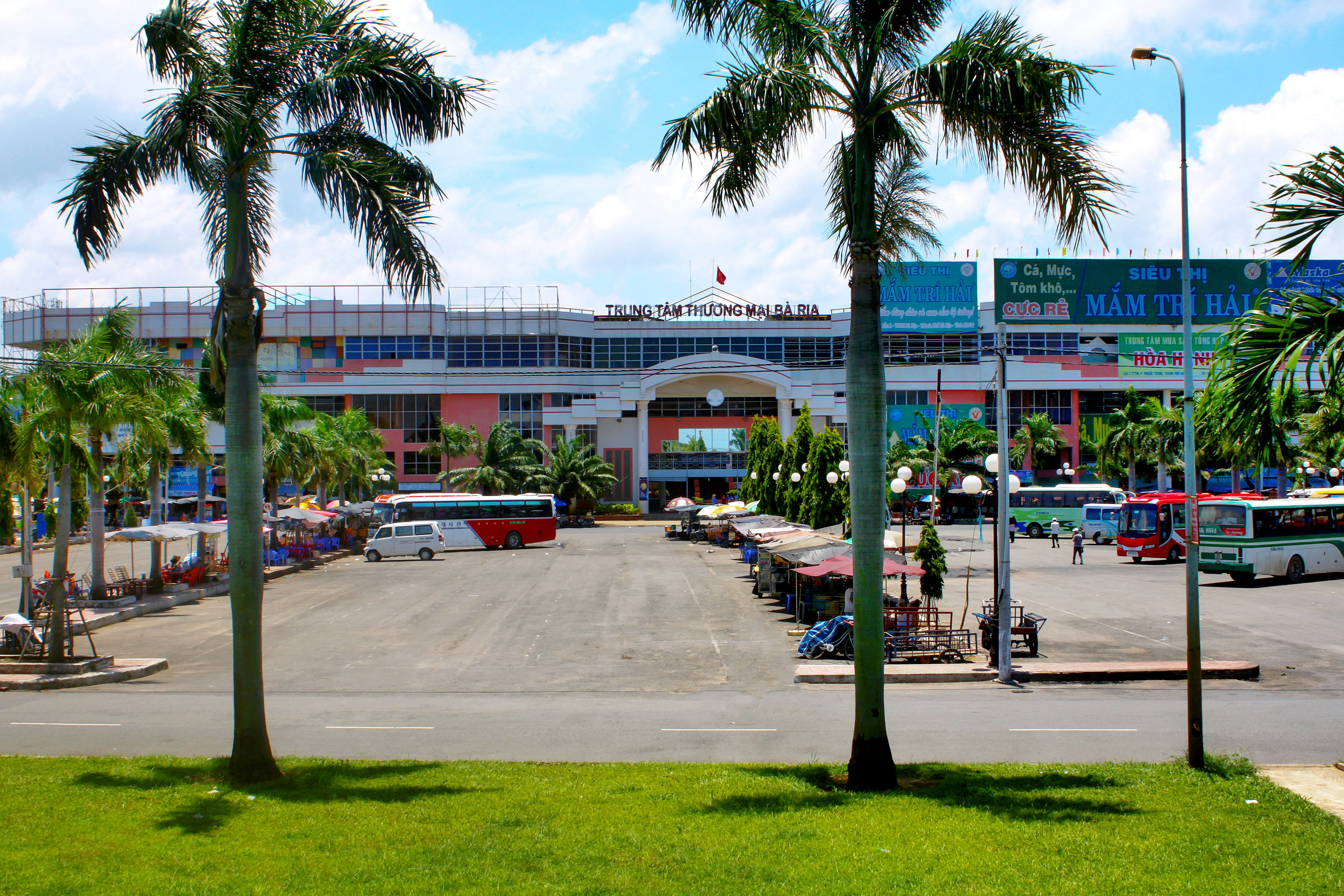
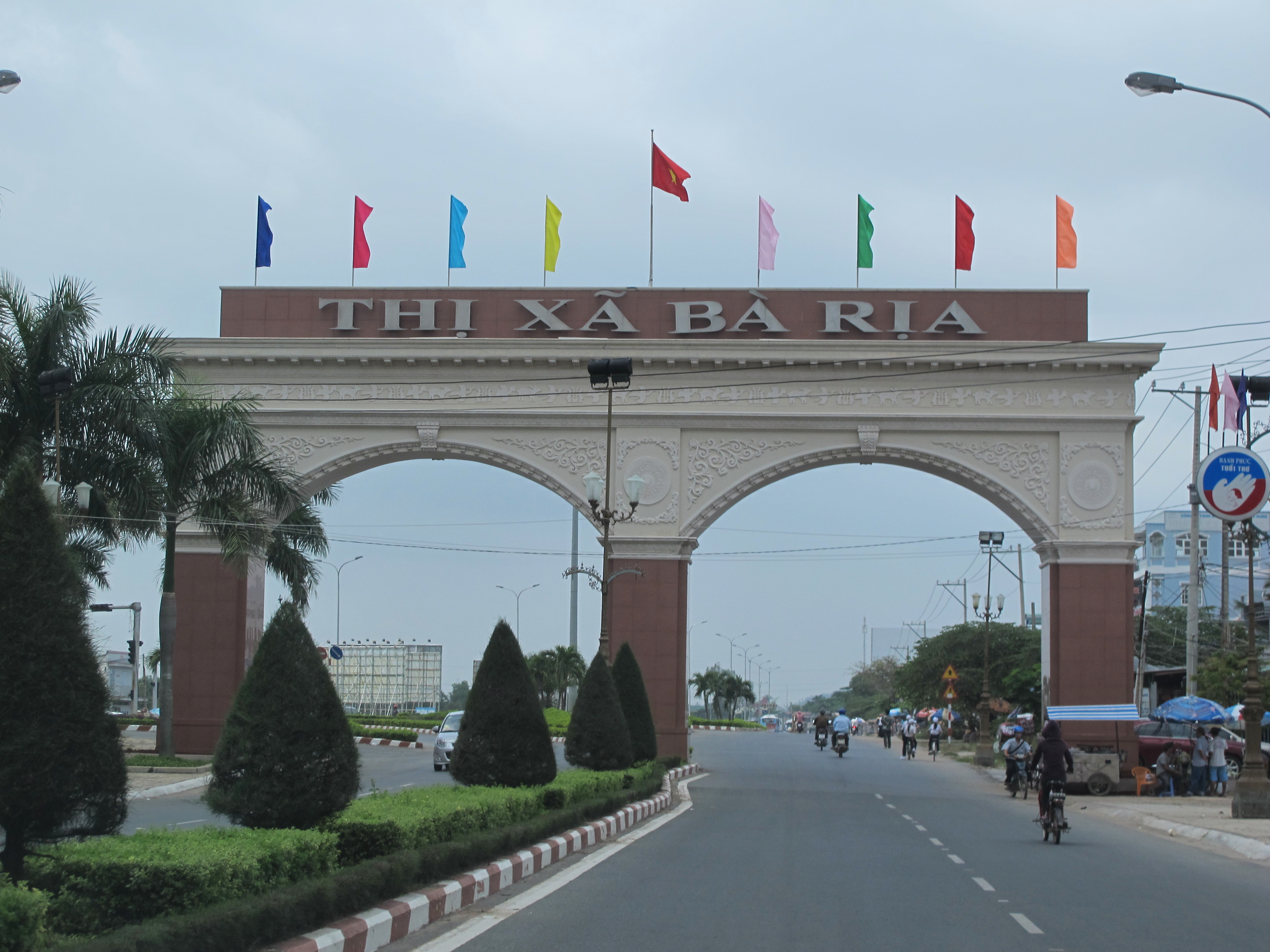
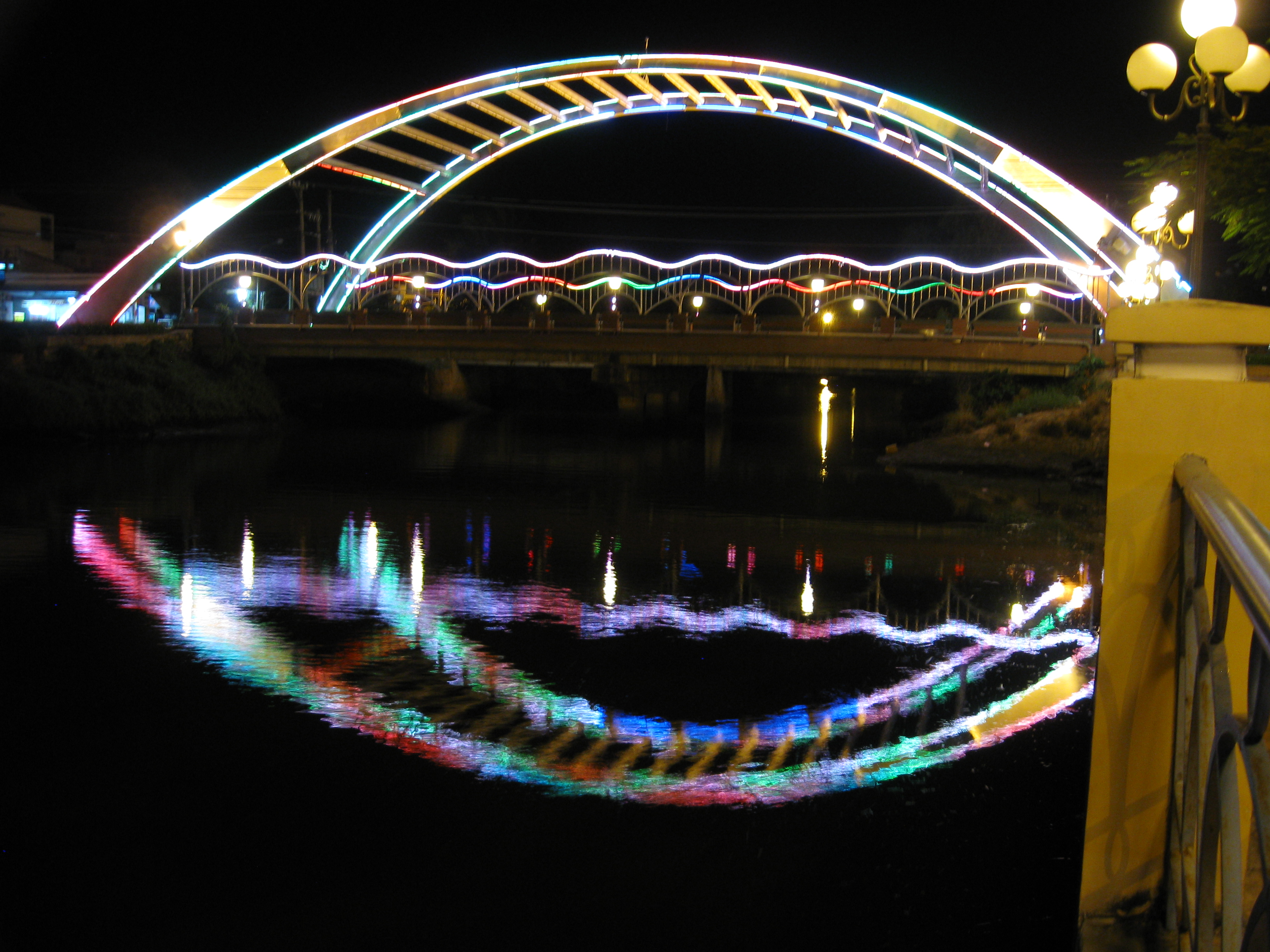
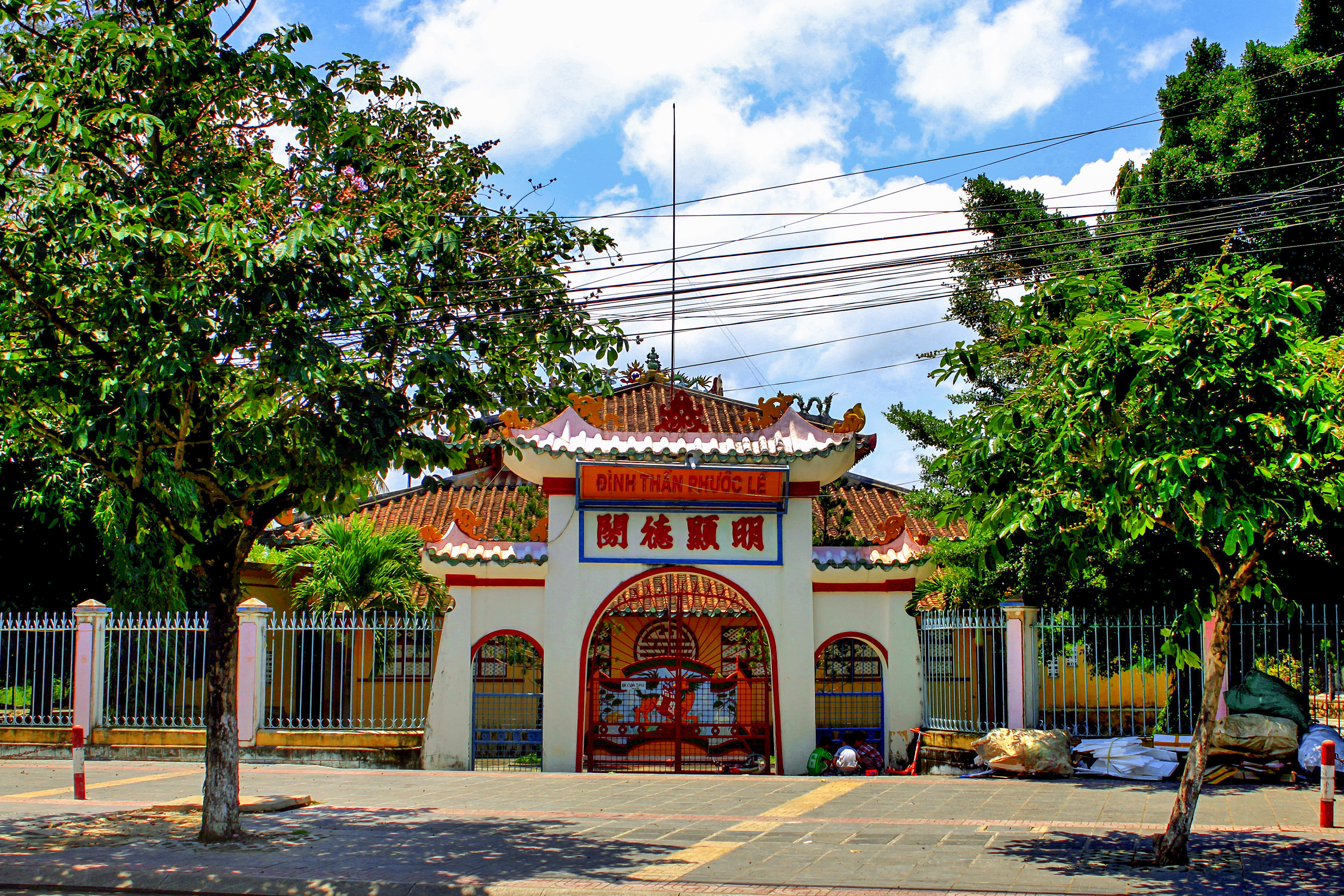
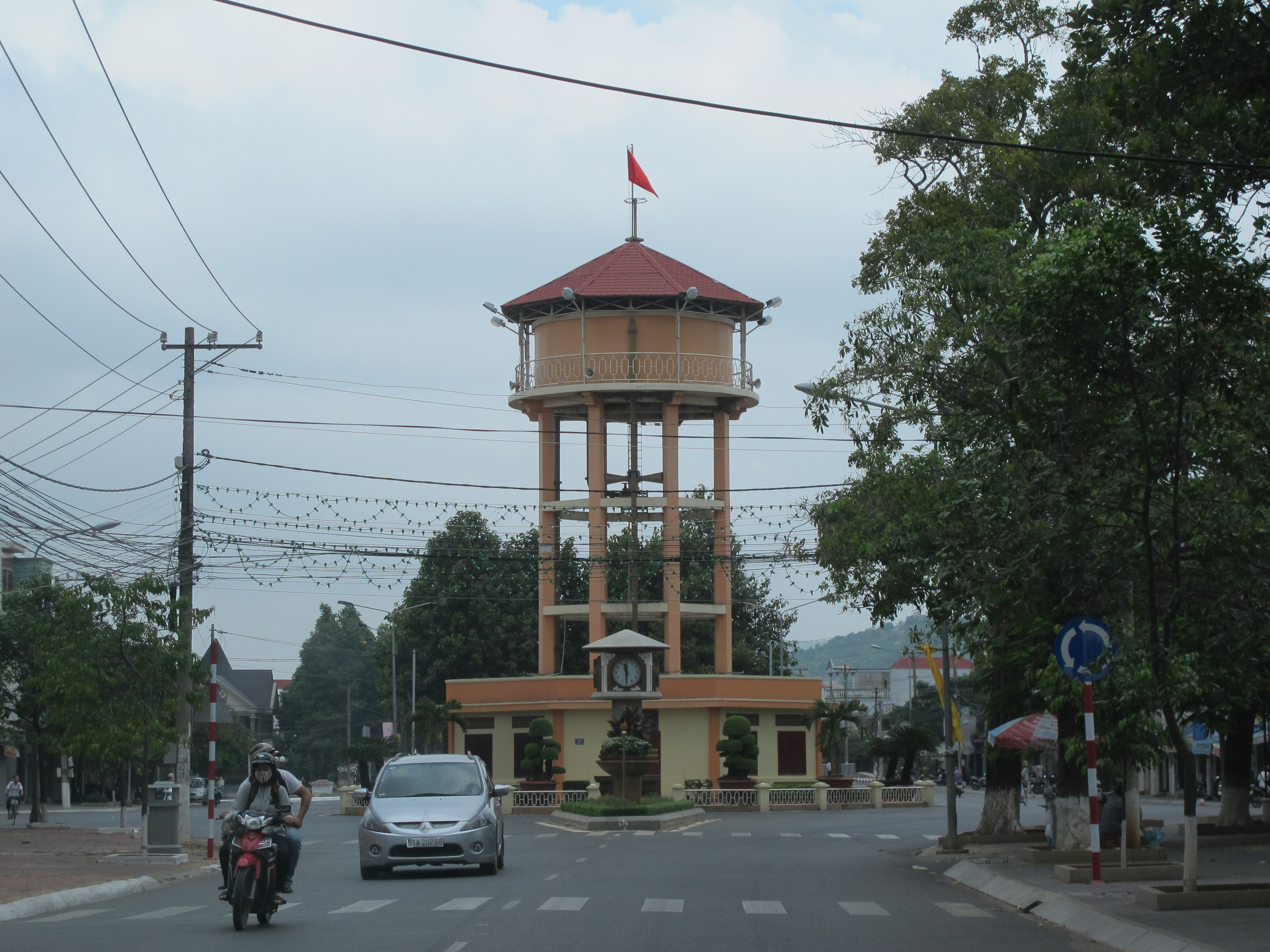
- Top down from left to right: Bà Rịa – Vũng Tàu provincial administration center, Bà Rịa commercial center, Bà Rịa welcome gate, Long Hương Bridge crosses the Dinh River, Phước Lễ Temple, Bà Rịa Roundhouse

- Seal

- Location of in Vietnam
- Coordinates: 10°29′57″N 107°10′3″E
- Country: Vietnam
- Province: Bà Rịa–Vũng Tàu
- Established town: 2 June 1994

Government
  - chairman of the municipal committee: Phạm Chí Lợi

Area
  - Total: 91.04 km^{2} (35.15 sq mi)

Population (2022 census)
  - Total: 235,192
  - Density: 2,584/km^{2} (6,690/sq mi)
- Time zone: UTC+07:00 (ICT)
- Climate: Aw

Bà Rịa (Vietnamese: [ɓaː˧˩ riə˧˨˧ˀ]) was a former provincial city in the former Bà Rịa–Vũng Tàu province in the Southeast region of Vietnam. Bà Rịa was adjacented to Vũng Tàu by Cỏ May river and connected by Cỏ May Bridge on National Route 51. This was the de jure seat of the province since most of the provincial administration agencies are located here. In May 2012, Bà Rịa officially replaced Vũng Tàu to become the provincial capital of Bà Rịa–Vũng Tàu.

The City of Bà Rịa ceased to exist on July 1, 2025, following the elimination of district level units in Vietnam.

== Location and administrative divisions ==
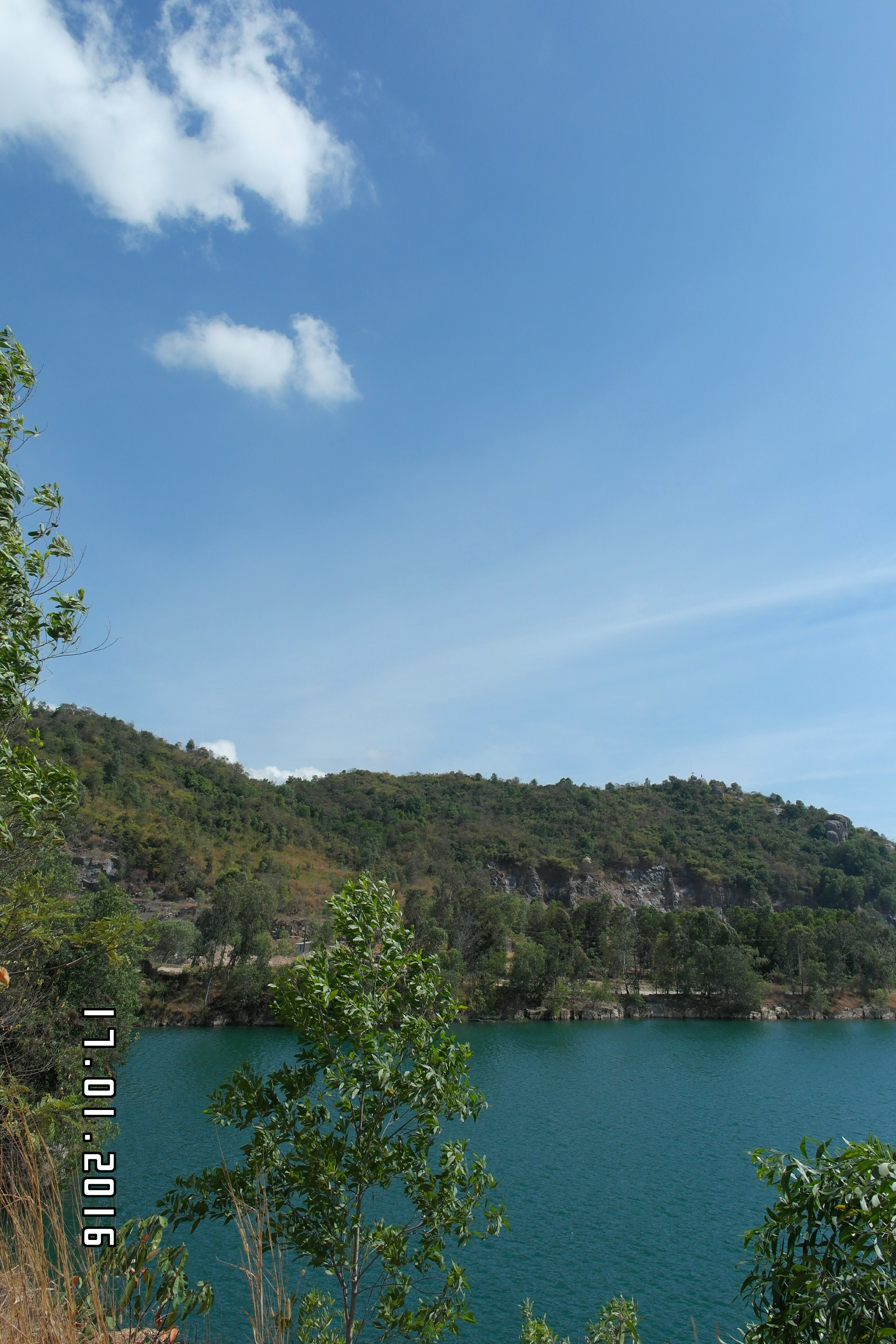
Bà Rịa Green Stone Lake in Kim Dinh

Bà Rịa is located 90 km east southeast of Ho Chi Minh City and 20 km northwest to the centre of the petroleum and beach city of Vũng Tàu. Bà Rịa borders Châu Đức District and part of Phú Mỹ City to the north, Vũng Tàu to the south, Long Điền District to the east, and Phú Mỹ to the west.

Bà Rịa has an area of 91.04 km^{2}, including seven urban wards (phường) (Long Toàn, Phước Hiệp, Phước Hưng, Phước Nguyên, Phước Trung, Long Hương, and Kim Dinh), with 3 rural communes (xã) (Hòa Long, Tân Hưng, and Long Phước). As of 2011, the town has 122,424 inhabitants; the density is 3,500 inhabitants/km^{2}.

== History ==
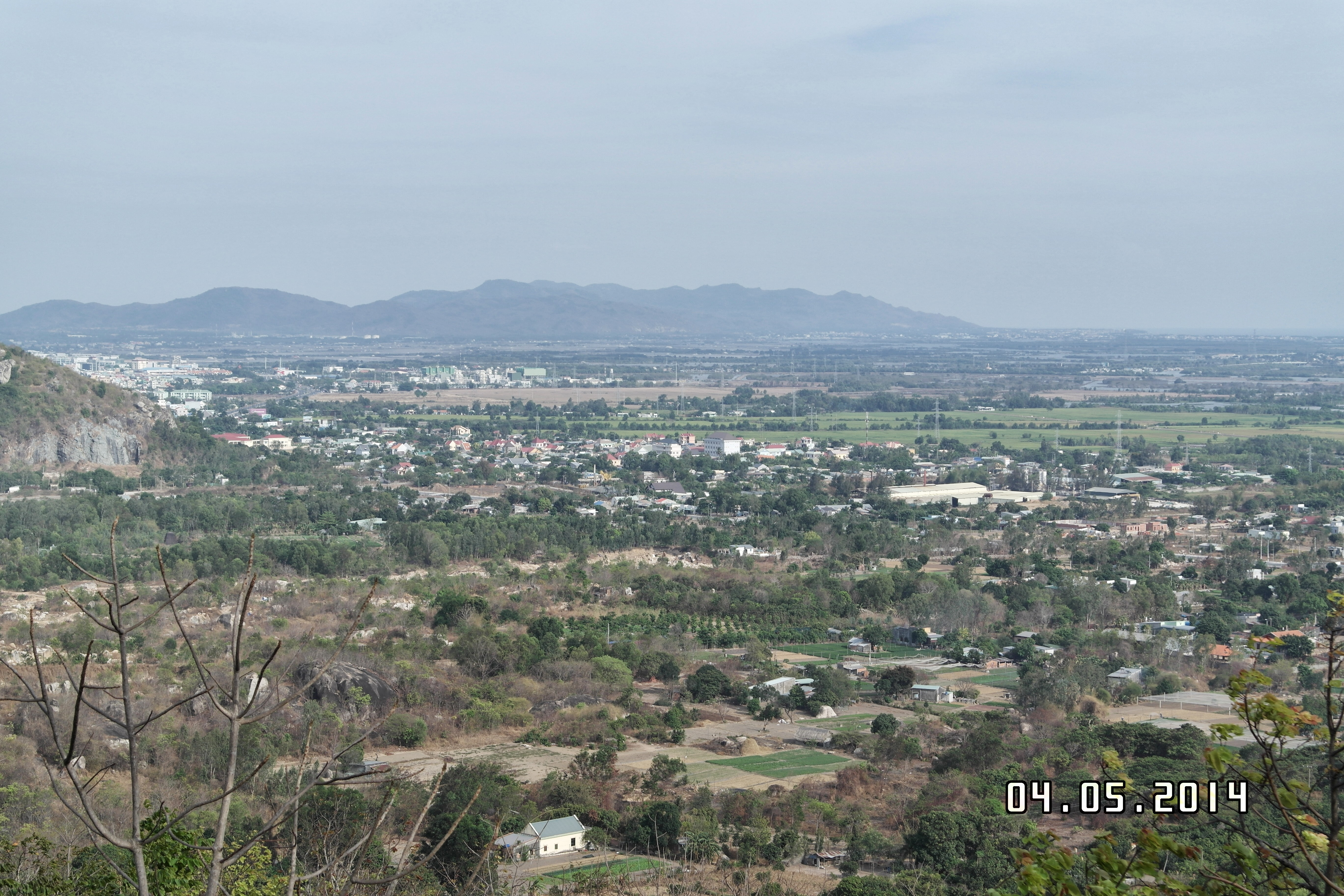
Dinh Hills at Long Hương

The city was promoted from the town of Bà Rịa to the capital city on 22 August 2012. It was the capital town (thị trấn Bà Rịa) of the district of Châu Thành (was part of Đồng Nai province before 1991 then Bà Rịa – Vũng Tàu province), then in 1994, the district was split into the districts of Châu Đức, Tân Thành (Phú Mỹ City), and Bà Rịa district-level town (thị xã). Many provincial agencies have been relocated from Vũng Tàu to Bà Rịa. By 2007, this city was a 3rd-class municipality in Vietnam and was upgraded to 2nd-class municipality on 27 November 2014.

== Transportation ==
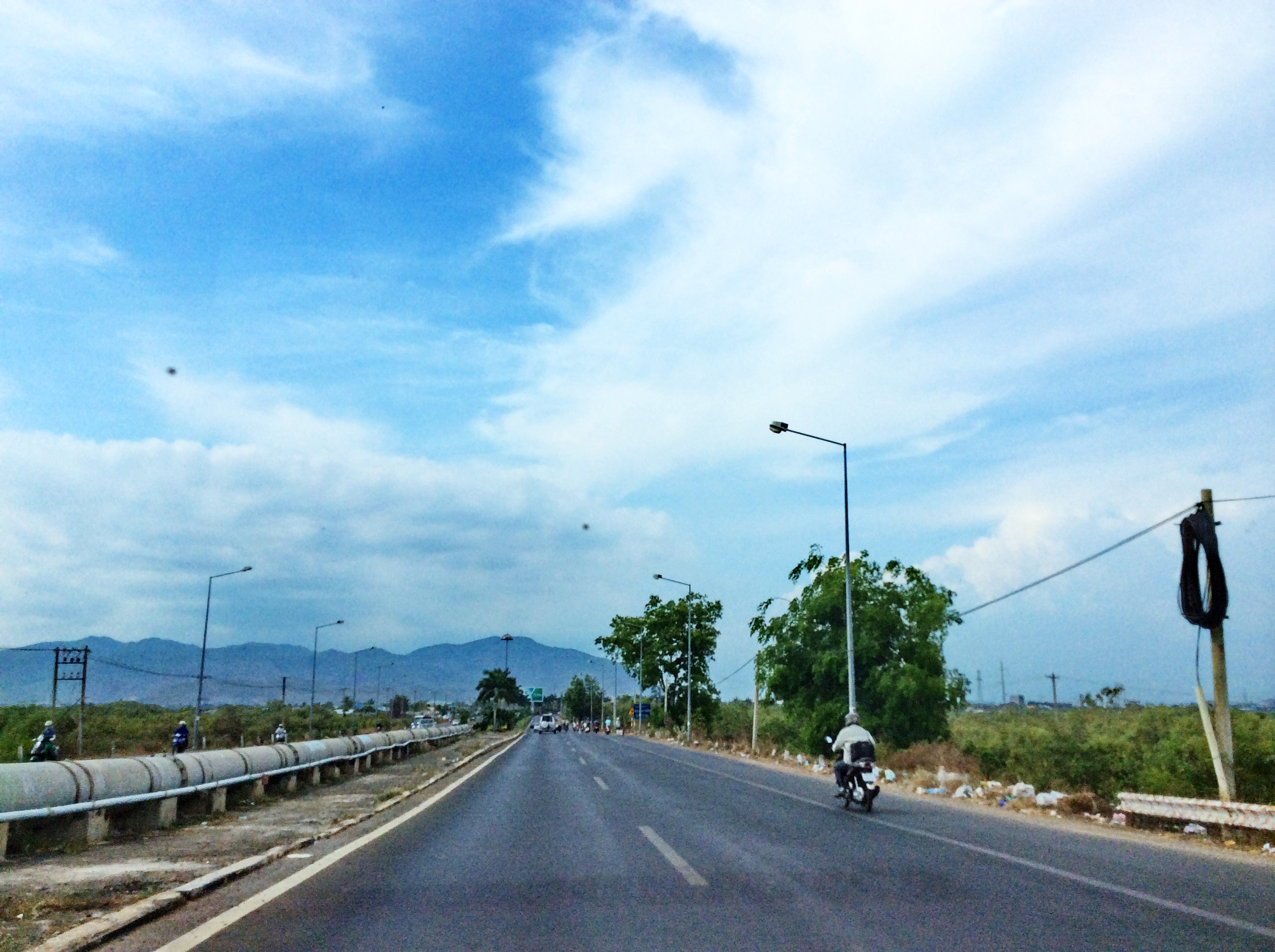
Cỏ May 2 Bridge on National Route 51 crosses Cỏ May River

Bà Rịa is an important transport hub of the province, with some national routes are Route 51, Route 56 (starts from Route 51), Route 55A and Provincial Road 52. Bà Rịa is situated about 48 km southeast of the planned Long Thành International Airport on National Route 51 and Biên Hoà–Vũng Tàu Expressway. Bà Rịa has Bà Rịa Secres Port. The city also serves as a transit point between Ho Chi Minh City and Xuân Lộc (Đồng Nai province) with seaside resorts at the Long Hải and Bình Châu hot springs by road.

== Tourism ==
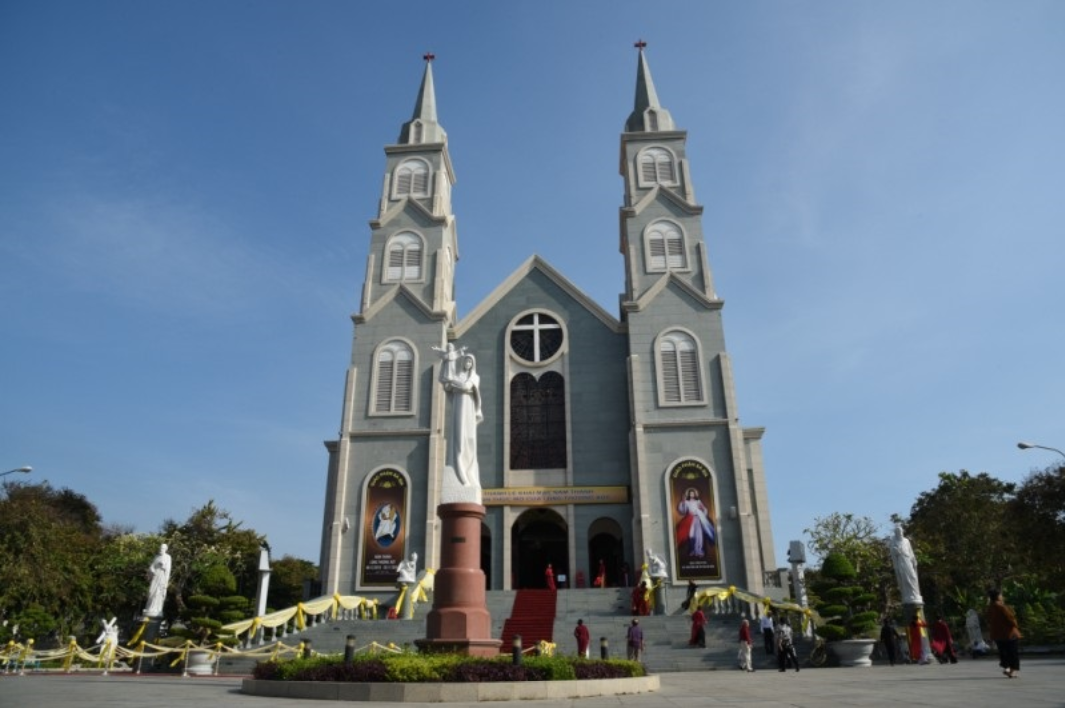
Bà Rịa Cathedral

The City of Bà Rịa has several historical sites and scenic spots such as: Phước Lễ Village Temple, Cathedral of Bà Rịa, Bà Rịa Round House, Long Phước tunnels, Dinh Hills with the green stone lake, Bà Rịa Square and Park, with many coffee shops...

Public spaces: The city has dozens of public spaces of various sizes serving the recreational needs of the people. Notable examples include Lê Thành Duy Park, Hoà Bình Park, East–West of Dinh River Park (Công viên Đông Tây bờ sông Dinh; inaugurated in 2016), Bà Rịa Square and Park (2022), and many smaller parks in various wards and neighborhoods.

== See also ==
- Battle of Ba Ria
