= Châu Pha =

Châu Pha Xã Châu Pha
- Commune
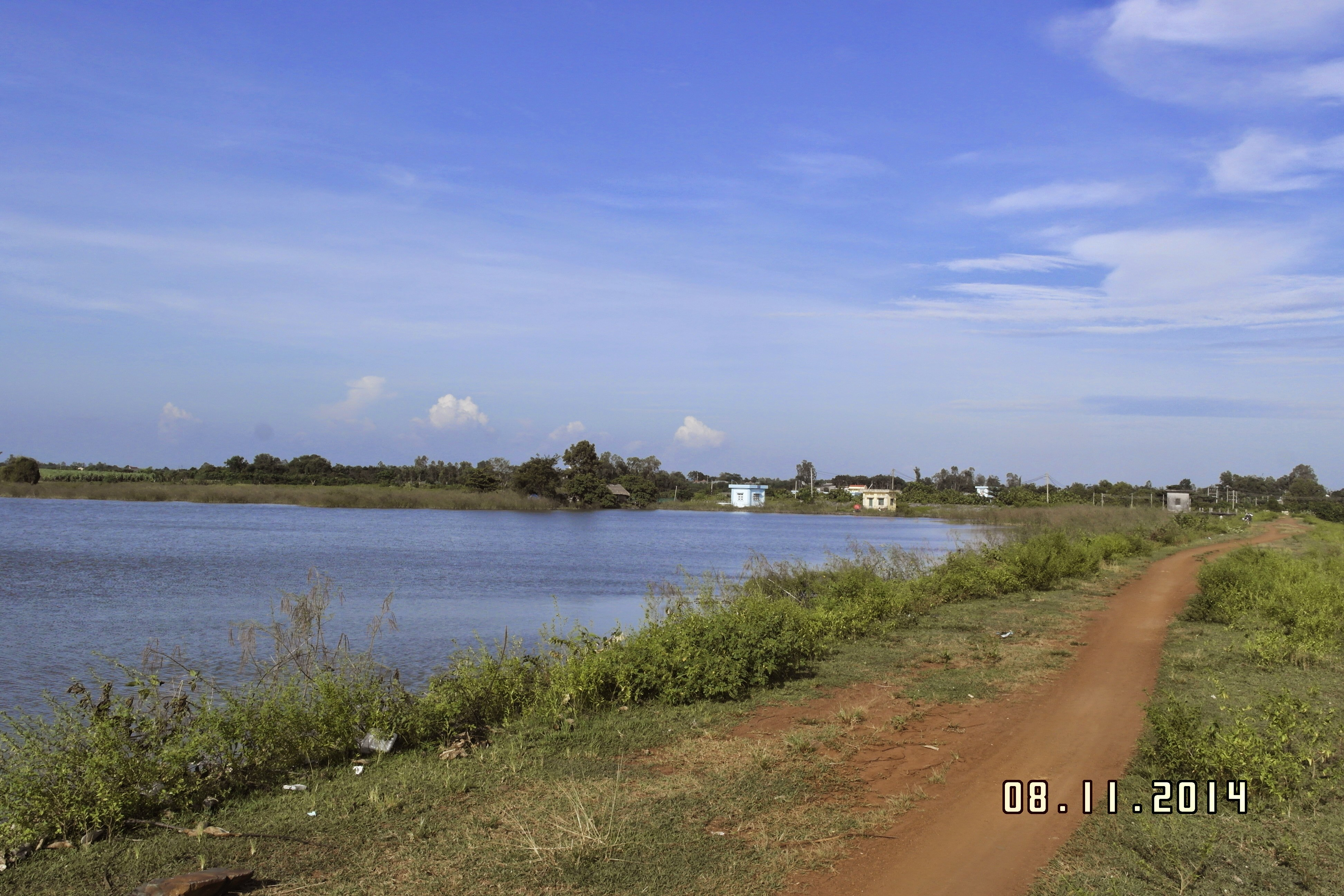
- Châu Pha Reservoir
- Interactive map of Châu Pha
- Coordinates: 10°34′28″N 107°09′17″E
- Country: Vietnam
- Municipality: Ho Chi Minh City
- Established: June 16, 2025

Area
  - Total: 25.34 sq mi (65.64 km^{2})

Population (2024)
  - Total: 25,438
  - Density: 1,004/sq mi (387.5/km^{2})
- Time zone: UTC+07:00 (Indochina Time)
- Administrative code: 26728

Châu Pha (Vietnamese: Xã Châu Pha) is a commune of Ho Chi Minh City, Vietnam. It is one of the 168 new wards, communes and special zones of the city following the reorganization in 2025.

== Geography ==
Chau Pha Commune is located in the east of Ho Chi Minh City, about 10 kilometers north of Bà Rịa and about 70 kilometers southeast of Saigon

- To the east, it borders the communes of Ngai Giao and Nghia Thanh.
- To the south, it borders Long Huong and Tan Hai.
- To the west, it borders Tan Phuoc and Phu My.
- To the north, it borders Tan Thanh.

According to Official Dispatch No. 2896/BNV-CQDP dated May 27, 2025 of the Ministry of Home Affairs, Chau Pha commune after the arrangement has an area of 65.64 km², population as of December 31, 2024 is 25,438 people, population density reaches 387 people/km² (statistical data as of December 31, 2024 according to regulations in Article 6 of Resolution No. 76/2025/UBTVQH15 dated April 14, 2025 of the Standing Committee of the National Assembly.

== History ==
During the French colonial period, the area of Chau Pha commune today belonged to Hac Dich village, An Trach commune, Ba Ria province.

On December 8, 1982, the Council of Ministers issued Decision No. 192-HDBT on the establishment of the new economic commune Chau Pha in Chau Thanh district on the basis of separating part of the area and population of Hac Dich commune and Long Huong commune.

On June 2, 1994, the Government issued Decree No. 45-CP on:

- Adjust 800 hectares of natural area of Phuoc Tan village, Ba Ria town to Chau Pha commune for management.
- Move Chau Pha commune to the newly established Tan Thanh district.

After adjusting administrative boundaries, Chau Pha commune has 3,448 hectares of natural area and 6,082 people.

On June 27, 2005, the Government issued Decree No. 83/2005/ND-CP on adjusting 28.53 hectares of natural area and 122 people of Chau Pha commune to Ba Ria for management (now part of Tan Hung commune).

On June 16, 2025, the National Assembly Standing Committee issued Resolution No. 1685/NQ-UBTVQH15 on the arrangement of commune-level administrative units of Ho Chi Minh City in 2025 (effective from June 16, 2025). Accordingly, the entire land area and population of Tóc Tiên and Châu Pha communes of the former Phú Mỹ city will be integrated into a new commune named Châu Pha (Clause 148, Article 1).
