= Châu Đức =

Châu Đức Xã Châu Đức
- Commune
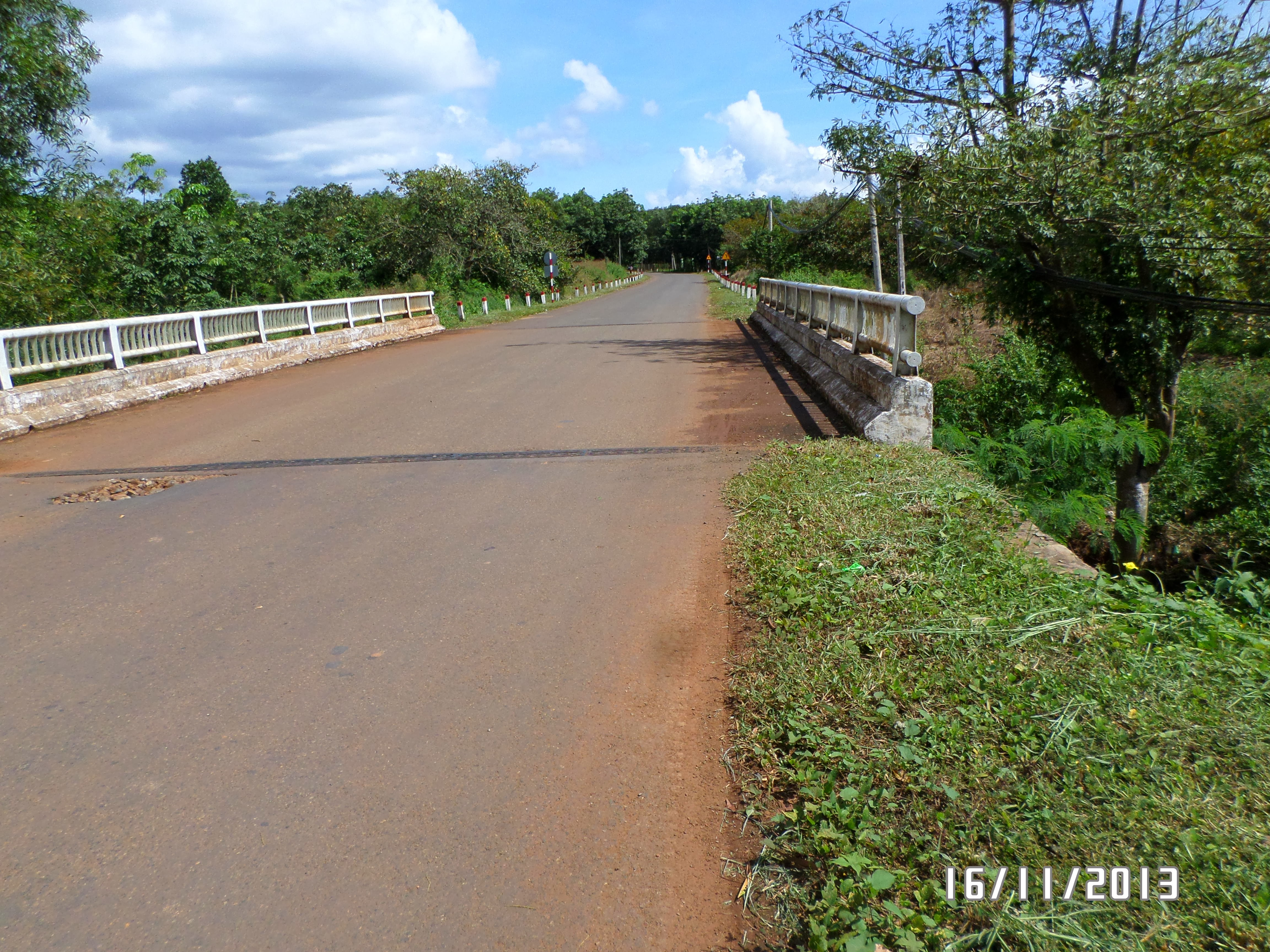
- A road in Châu Đức
- Interactive map of Châu Đức
- Coordinates: 10°43′37″N 107°14′25″E
- Country: Vietnam
- Municipality: Ho Chi Minh City
- Established: June 16, 2025

Area
  - Total: 32.69 sq mi (84.66 km^{2})

Population (2024)
  - Total: 28,240
  - Density: 863.9/sq mi (333.6/km^{2})
- Time zone: UTC+07:00 (Indochina Time)
- Administrative code: 26596

Châu Đức (Vietnamese: Xã Châu Đức) is a commune of Ho Chi Minh City, Vietnam. It is one of the 168 new wards, communes and special zones of the city following the reorganization in 2025.

== Geography ==
Châu Đức is located in the east of Ho Chi Minh City, about 30 kilometers north of Bà Rịa ward and about 80 kilometers east of Saigon ward it has the following geographical location:

- To the northeast, it borders Sông Ray commune of Đồng Nai province
- To the east, it borders Bình Giã commune
- To the south, it borders Kim Long commune
- To the southwest, it borders Tân Thành ward
- To the west, it borders Phước Thái and Long Phước communes of Đồng Nai province
- To the north, it borders Xuân Đường and Cẩm Mỹ communes of Đồng Nai province.

According to Official Dispatch No. 2896/BNV-CQĐP dated May 27, 2025 of the Ministry of Home Affairs, following the merger, Châu Đức has a land area of 84.66 km², the population as of December 31, 2024 is 28,240 people, the population density is 333 people/km².

== History ==
On June 16, 2025, the National Assembly Standing Committee issued Resolution No. 1685/NQ-UBTVQH15 on the arrangement of commune-level administrative units of Ho Chi Minh City in 2025 (effective from June 16, 2025). Accordingly, the entire land area and population of Cù Bị and Xà Bang communes of the former Châu Đức district will be integrated into a new commune named Châu Đức (Clause 156, Article 1).
