= Kim Long, Ho Chi Minh City =

Kim Long Xã Kim Long
- Commune
- Interactive map of Kim Long
- Coordinates: 10°42′18″N 107°13′52″E
- Country: Vietnam
- Municipality: Ho Chi Minh City
- Established: June 16, 2025

Area
  - Total: 24.68 sq mi (63.92 km^{2})

Population (2024)
  - Total: 33,369
  - Density: 1,352/sq mi (522.0/km^{2})
- Time zone: UTC+07:00 (Indochina Time)
- Administrative code: 26608

Kim Long (Vietnamese: Xã Kim Long) is a commune of Ho Chi Minh City, Vietnam. It is one of the 168 new wards, communes and special zones of the city following the reorganization in 2025.

== Geography ==
Kim Long is located in the east of Ho Chi Minh City, roughly 25 kilometers north of Bà Rịa and about 80 kilometers southeast of Saigon ward. It is bordered by:

- Bình Giã commune to the east,
- Ngãi Giao commune to the south,
- Tân Thành ward to the west,
- Châu Đức commune to the north.

According to Official Dispatch No. 2896/BNV-CQĐP dated May 27, 2025 of the Ministry of Home Affairs, following the merger, Kim Long has a land area of 63.92 km², the population as of December 31, 2024 is 33,369 people, the population density is 522 people/km².

== History ==
On June 16, 2025, the National Assembly Standing Committee issued Resolution No. 1685/NQ-UBTVQH15 on the arrangement of commune-level administrative units of Ho Chi Minh City in 2025 (effective from June 16, 2025). Accordingly, the entire land area and population of Kim Long township and Bàu Chinh, Láng Lớn communes of the former Châu Đức district will be integrated into a new commune named Kim Long (Clause 155, Article 1).
