= Tân Thành, Ho Chi Minh City =

Tân Thành Phường Tân Thành Hắc Dịch, Sông Xoài
- Ward
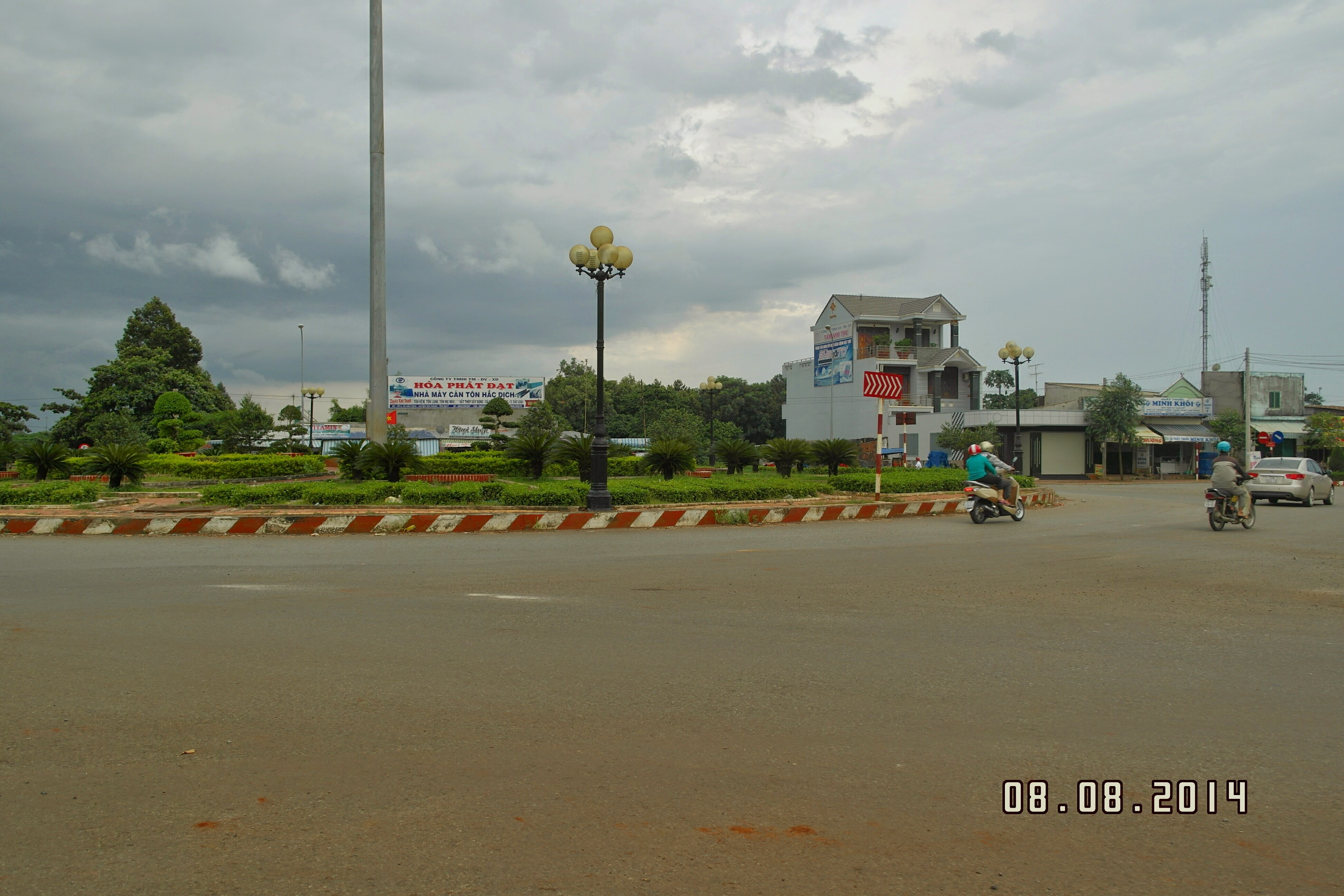
- A street in Tân Thành
- Interactive map of Tân Thành
- Coordinates: 10°38′47″N 107°06′46″E
- Country: Vietnam
- Municipality: Ho Chi Minh City
- Established: June 16, 2025

Area
  - Total: 23.80 sq mi (61.63 km^{2})

Population (2024)
  - Total: 33,943
  - Density: 1,426/sq mi (550.8/km^{2})
- Time zone: UTC+07:00 (Indochina Time)
- Administrative code: 26725

Tân Thành (Vietnamese: Phường Tân Thành) is a ward of Ho Chi Minh City, Vietnam. It is one of the 168 new wards, communes and special zones of the city following the reorganization in 2025.

== Geography ==
Tân Thành is located in the south of Ho Chi Minh City, it is about 60 kilometers southeast of Saigon and about 20 kilometers north of Bà Rịa, it borders the following wards and communes:

- To the northwest, it borders Phước Thái commune of Đồng Nai province
- To the northeast, it borders Châu Đức commune
- To the east, it borders Kim Long commune
- To the southeast, it borders Ngãi Giao commune
- To the south, it borders Châu Pha commune
- To the west, it borders Phú Mỹ ward.

According to Official Dispatch No. 2896/BNV-CQĐP dated May 27, 2025 of the Ministry of Home Affairs, following the merger, Tân Thành has a land area of 61.63 km², the population as of December 31, 2024 is 33,943 people, the population density is 550 people/km².

== History ==
On June 16, 2025, the National Assembly Standing Committee issued Resolution No. 1685/NQ-UBTVQH15 on the arrangement of commune-level administrative units of Ho Chi Minh City in 2025 (effective from June 16, 2025). Accordingly, the entire land area and population of Hắc Dịch ward and Sông Xoài commune of the former Phú Mỹ city will be integrated into a new ward named Tân Thành (Clause 112, Article 1).

== Historical Sites ==
- Địa đạo Hắc Dịch
