= Long Hương =

Long Hương Phường Long Hương
- Ward
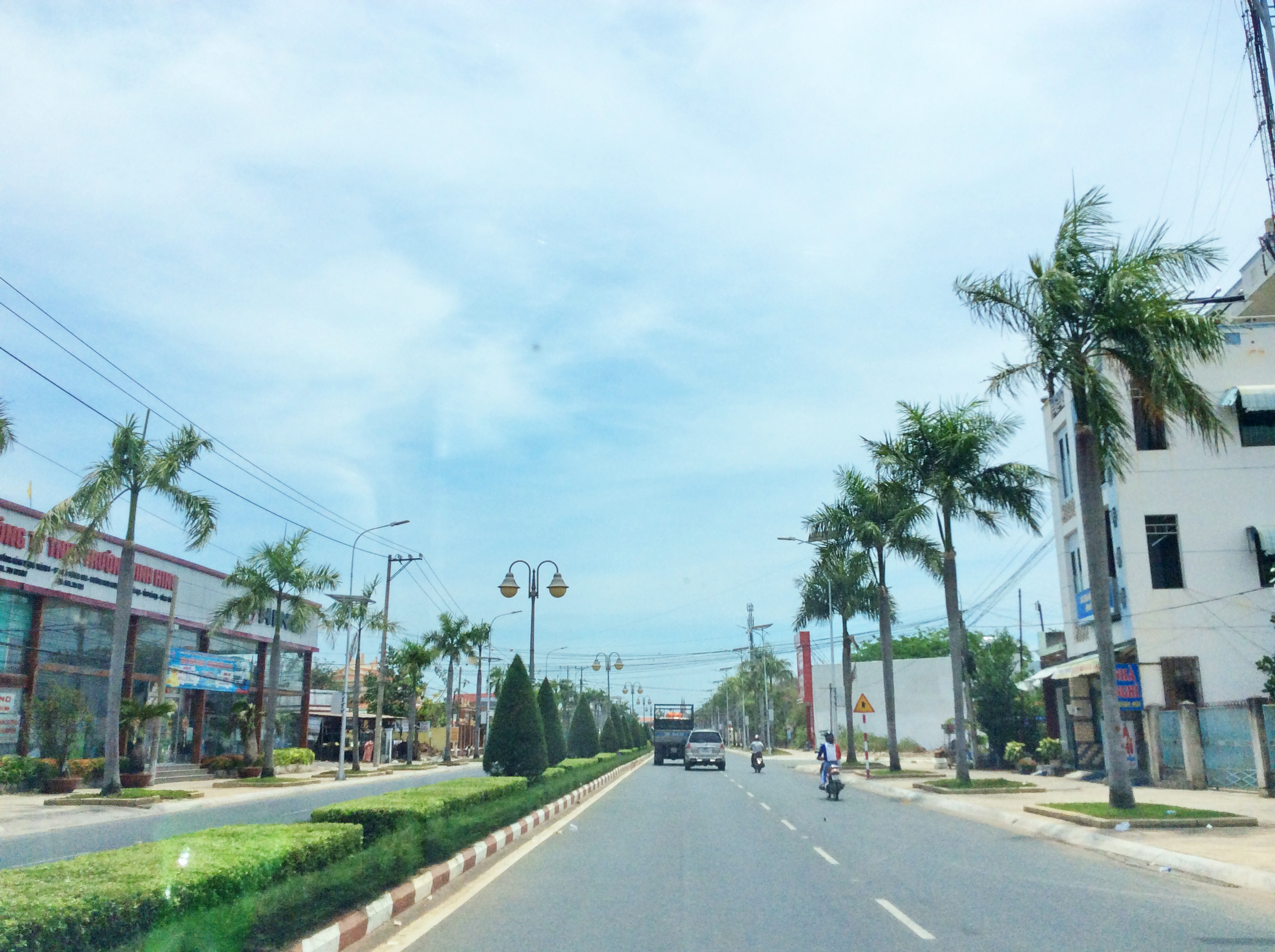
- Cách Mạng Tháng Tám Road in Long Hương
- Interactive map of Long Hương
- Coordinates: 10°29′51″N 107°09′37″E
- Country: Vietnam
- Municipality: Ho Chi Minh City
- Established: June 16, 2025

Area
  - Total: 15.92 sq mi (41.22 km^{2})

Population (2024)
  - Total: 31,457
  - Density: 1,977/sq mi (763.1/km^{2})
- Time zone: UTC+07:00 (Indochina Time)
- Administrative code: 26566

Long Hương (Vietnamese: Phường Long Hương) is a ward of Ho Chi Minh City, Vietnam. It is one of the 168 new wards, communes and special zones of the city following the reorganization in 2025.

== Geography ==
Long Hương is located more than 60 kilometers southeast of Saigon and about 25 kilometers northeast of Vũng Tàu. Long Hương borders the following wards and communes:

- To the east, it borders Tam Long and Bà Rịa
- To the west, it borders Tân Hải
- To the south, it borders Long Sơn and Phước Thắng
- To the north, it borders Châu Pha and Nghĩa Thành

According to Official Dispatch No. 2896/BNV-CQĐP dated May 27, 2025 of the Ministry of Home Affairs, following the merger, Long Hương has a land area of 41.22 km², the population as of December 31, 2024 is 31,457 people, the population density is 763 people/km².

== History ==
On June 2, 1994, Long Hương commune was established in Bà Rịa

On October 22, 2002, the Government issued Decree 83/2002/ND-CP, it states that:

- Long Hương ward is established based on 1,485.1 hectares of land and 6,767 people of Long Hương commune.
- Kim Dinh ward was established with the remaining land and population of Long Hương commune.

On June 16, 2025, the National Assembly Standing Committee issued Resolution No. 1685/NQ-UBTVQH15 on the arrangement of commune-level administrative units of Ho Chi Minh City in 2025 (effective from June 16, 2025). Accordingly, the entire land area and population of Kim Dinh, Long Hương wards and Tân Hưng commune of the former Bà Rịa city will be integrated into a new ward named Long Hương (Clause 106, Article 1).
