= Kim Long =

Kim Long may refer to :

- Kim Long, Ho Chi Minh City, a commune, Vietnam
- Kim Long, Thừa Thiên-Huế, a commune-level division of Huế, Vietnam
- Kim Long, Vĩnh Phúc, Tam Dương District, Vĩnh Phúc Province, Vietnam
- Kim Cliett Long, American author and educator
