= Dinh =

Dinh may refer to:

== Dinh ==
pronounced "zinh" or "yinh"

- Dinh River (Bà Rịa–Vũng Tàu), river in Bà Rịa–Vũng Tàu, one of five rivers named Sông Dinh in Vietnam.
- núi Dinh, hills in Bà Rịa–Vũng Tàu, Vietnam

== Đình ==
pronounced "dinh"

- Đình, Vietnamese communal temple

== Đinh ==
Đinh Dynasty

- Đinh Dynasty, the imperial dynasty of Vietnam from 968 to 980
  - Đinh Bộ Lĩnh (924–979), considered the first king in the history of Vietnam
  - Đinh Phế Đế (974–1001), second and last king of the Dinh dynasty and son of Dinh Bo Linhand surname

People:

- Dinh (surname), a Vietnamese family name

== See also ==
Other given names:

- Lê Long Đĩnh (986–1009), last king (1005–09) of the Anterior Lê Dynasty of Vietnam
- Khải Định (1885–1925), 12th emperor of the Nguyễn Dynasty in Vietnam
- Tôn Thất Đính (born c. 1926), South Vietnamese lieutenant general and a key figure in the 1963 coup that deposed President Ngô Đình Diệm
- Trương Định (1820–64), a mandarin in the Nguyễn Dynasty of Vietnam and a guerrilla leader
- Dinh Gilly (1877–1940), French-Algerian operatic baritone and teacher

In popular culture:

- In Stephen King's The Dark Tower (series), a dinh is the word for the leader of a ka-tet, or group bound by fate.
