= Tam Long =

Tam Long Phường Tam Long Hòa Long, Long Kiên, Long Xuyên, Long Phước
- Ward
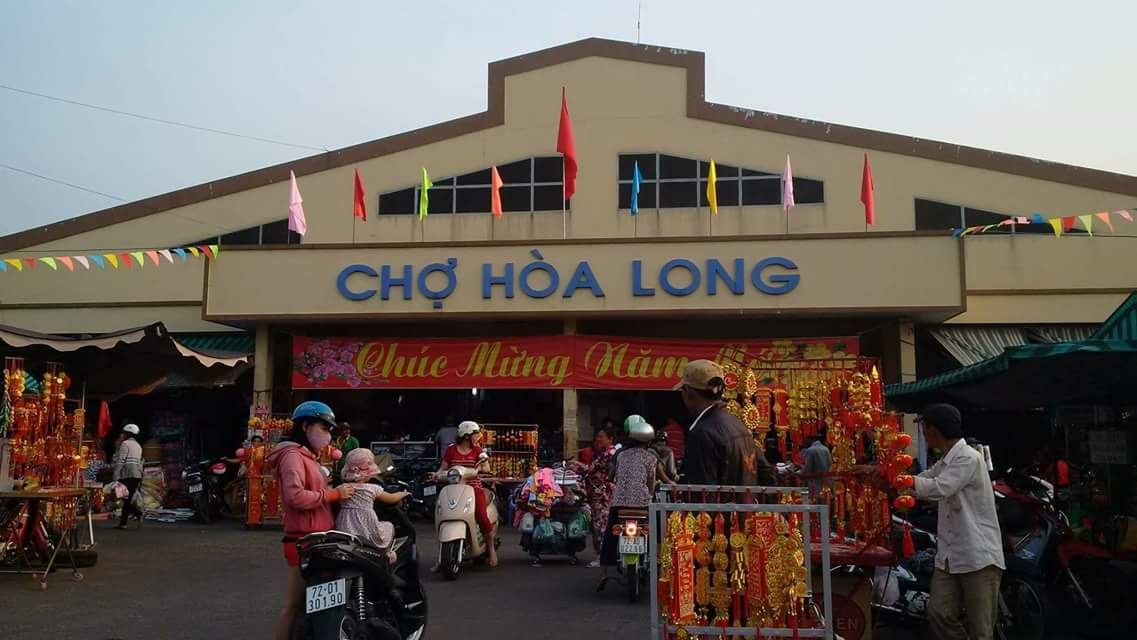
- Hòa Long Market
- Interactive map of Tam Long
- Coordinates: 10°31′18″N 107°12′26″E
- Country: Vietnam
- Municipality: Ho Chi Minh City
- Established: June 16, 2025

Area
  - Total: 13.40 sq mi (34.70 km^{2})

Population (2024)
  - Total: 41,130
  - Density: 3,070/sq mi (1,185/km^{2})
- Time zone: UTC+07:00 (Indochina Time)
- Administrative code: 26572

Tam Long (Vietnamese: Phường Tam Long) is a ward of Ho Chi Minh City, Vietnam. It is one of the 168 new wards, communes and special zones of the city following the reorganization in 2025.

== Geography ==
Tam Long is located roughly 60 kilometers southeast of Saigon and roughly 25 kilometers east of Vũng Tàu, it borders the following wards and communes:

- To the north, it borders Nghĩa Thành.
- To the west, it borders Long Hương and Bà Rịa.
- To the south, it borders Long Điền.
- To the east, it borders Đất Đỏ.

According to Official Dispatch No. 2896/BNV-CQĐP dated May 27, 2025 of the Ministry of Home Affairs, following the merger, Tam Long has a land area of 34.70 km², the population as of December 31, 2024 is 41,130 people, the population density is 1,185 people/km².

== Administration ==
Tam Long Ward is divided into 17 neighborhoods: 1, 2, 3, 4, 5, Bac 1 Hoa Long, Bac 2 Hoa Long, Bac 3 Hoa Long, Bac Long Phuoc, Dong Hoa Long, Dong Long Phuoc, Nam Hoa Long, Nam Long Phuoc, Phong Phu, Phuoc Huu, Tay Hoa Long, and Tay Long Phuoc.

== History ==
On June 16, 2025, the National Assembly Standing Committee issued Resolution No. 1685/NQ-UBTVQH15 on the arrangement of commune-level administrative units of Ho Chi Minh City in 2025 (effective from June 16, 2025). Accordingly, the entire land area and population of Long Tâm ward and Hòa Long, Long Phước communes of the former Bà Rịa city will be integrated into a new ward named Tam Long (Clause 108, Article 1).

== Agency headquarters ==
Headquarters of various agencies in Tam Long Ward:

- Headquarters of the People's Committee, People's Council, and Public Administrative Service Center: **237 Provincial Road 52** (formerly the People's Committee of Hoa Long Commune)
- Ward Police Headquarters: **100 Hoang Hoa Tham** (formerly the Long Tam Ward Police)
- Headquarters of the Ward Party Committee and the Ward Vietnam Fatherland Front Committee: **567 Vo Van Kiet** (formerly the Long Tam Ward People's Committee)
- Ward Military Command: **Provincial Road 52** (formerly the People's Committee of Long Phuoc Commune)

== Relics ==
- Long Phước Tunnels

== Gallery ==
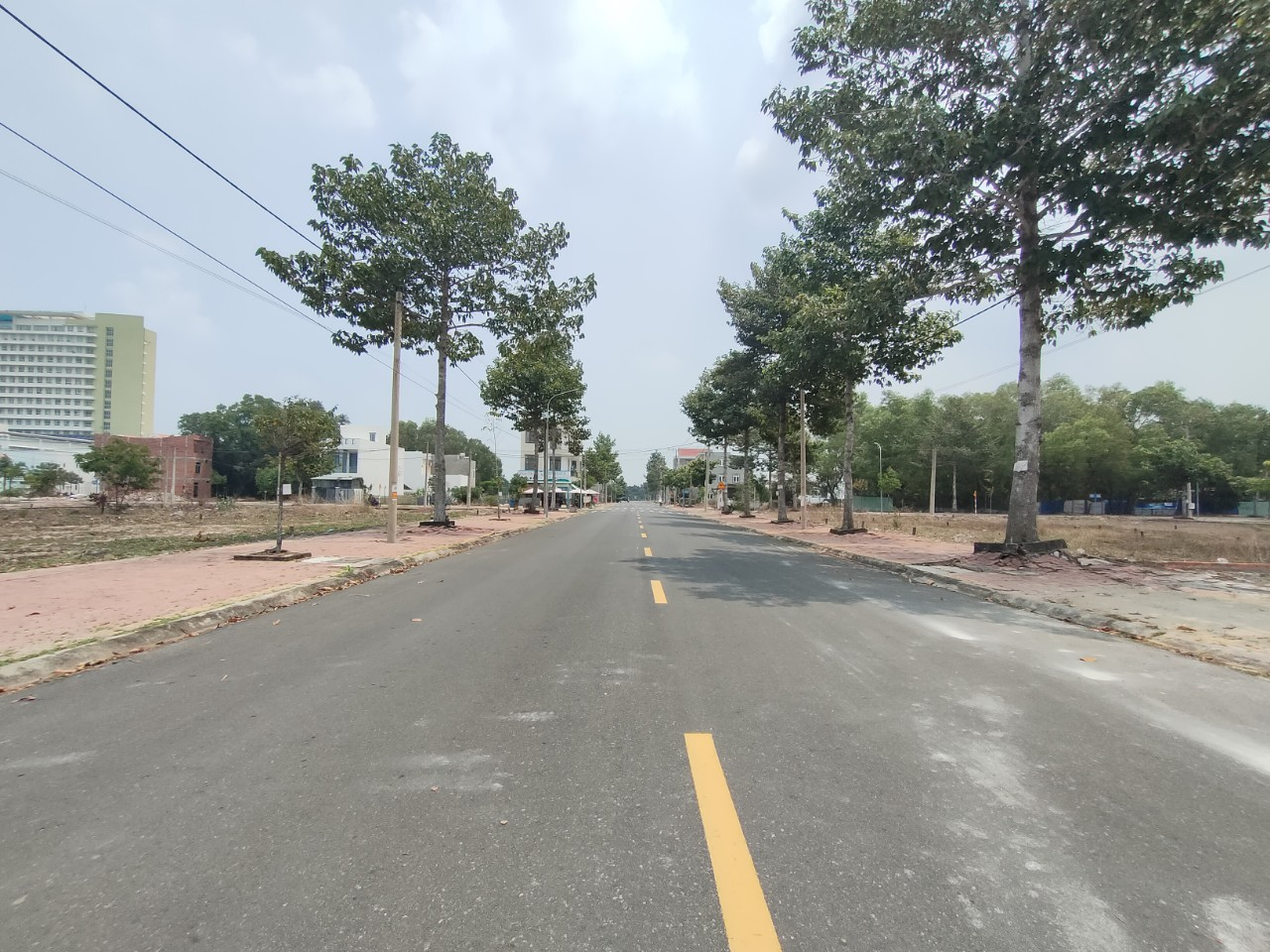
A road in Tam Long ward
