= Quảng Thành =

Quảng Thành may refer to the following places in Vietnam:

- Quảng Thành, Bà Rịa–Vũng Tàu, a commune of Châu Đức District
- Quảng Thành, Thanh Hóa, an inner ward and an outer commune of Thanh Hóa city
- Quảng Thành, Quảng Ninh, a commune of Hải Hà District
- Quảng Thành, Thừa Thiên-Huế, a commune of Quảng Điền District
