= Tân Hải, Ho Chi Minh City =

Tân Hải Phường Tân Hải Hội Bài
- Ward
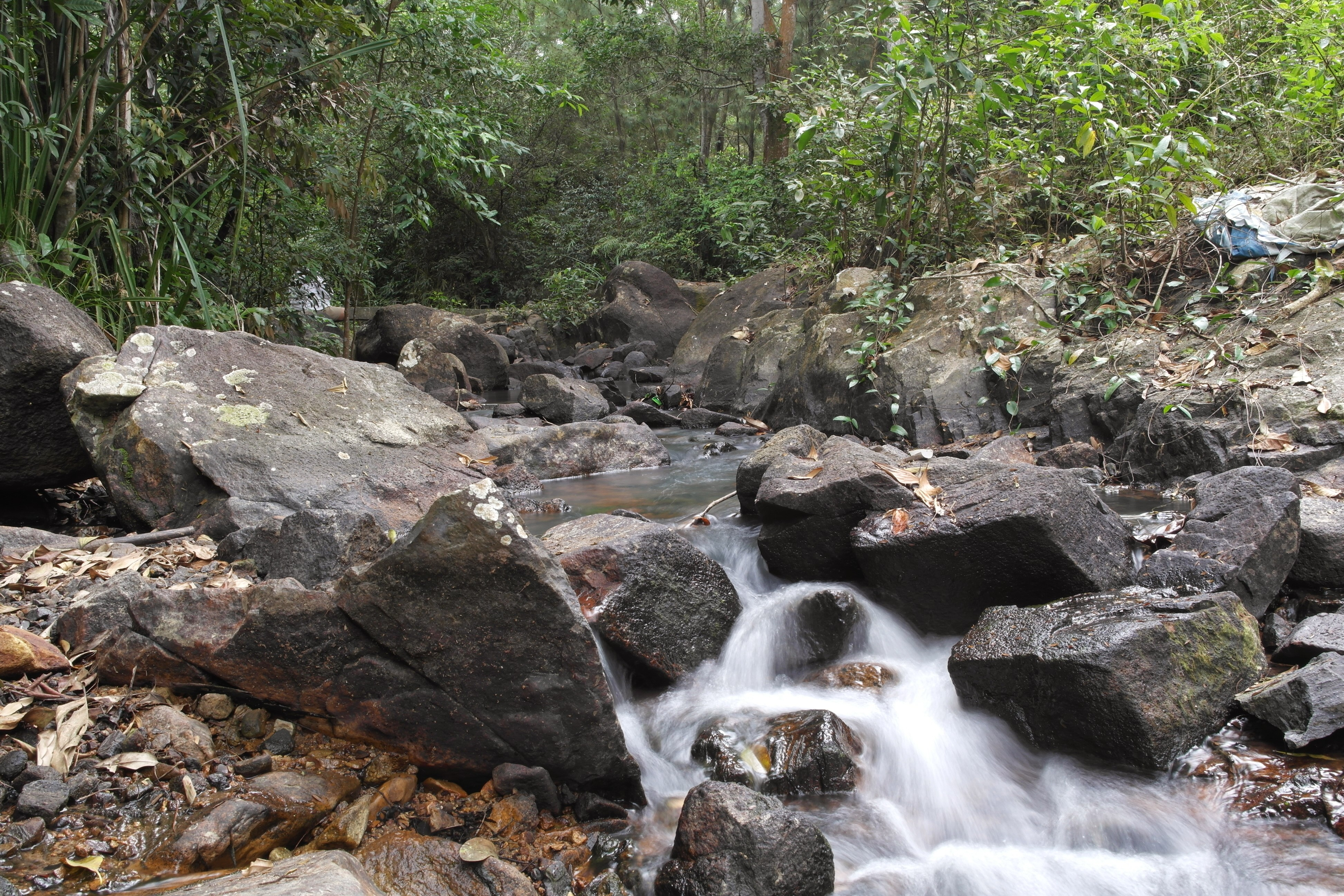
- A stream within the forest of Dinh Hills
- Interactive map of Tân Hải
- Coordinates: 10°30′31″N 107°06′52″E
- Country: Vietnam
- Municipality: Ho Chi Minh City
- Established: June 16, 2025

Area
  - Total: 20.02 sq mi (51.86 km^{2})

Population (2024)
  - Total: 30,297
  - Density: 1,513/sq mi (584.2/km^{2})
- Time zone: UTC+07:00 (Indochina Time)
- Administrative code: 26710

Tân Hải (Vietnamese: Phường Tân Hải) is a ward of Ho Chi Minh City, Vietnam. It is one of the 168 new wards, communes and special zones of the city following the reorganization in 2025.

== Geography ==
According to Official Dispatch No. 2896/BNV-CQĐP dated May 27, 2025 of the Ministry of Home Affairs, following the merger, Tân Hải has a land area of 51.86 km², the population as of December 31, 2024 is 30,297 people, the population density is 584 people/km².

== History ==
On June 16, 2025, the National Assembly Standing Committee issued Resolution No. 1685/NQ-UBTVQH15 on the arrangement of commune-level administrative units of Ho Chi Minh City in 2025 (effective from June 16, 2025). Accordingly, the entire land area and population of Tân Hòa and Tân Hải wards of the former Phú Mỹ city will be integrated into a new ward named Tân Hải (Clause 109, Article 1).
