= Xuân Sơn, Ho Chi Minh City =

Xuân Sơn Xã Xuân Sơn
- Commune
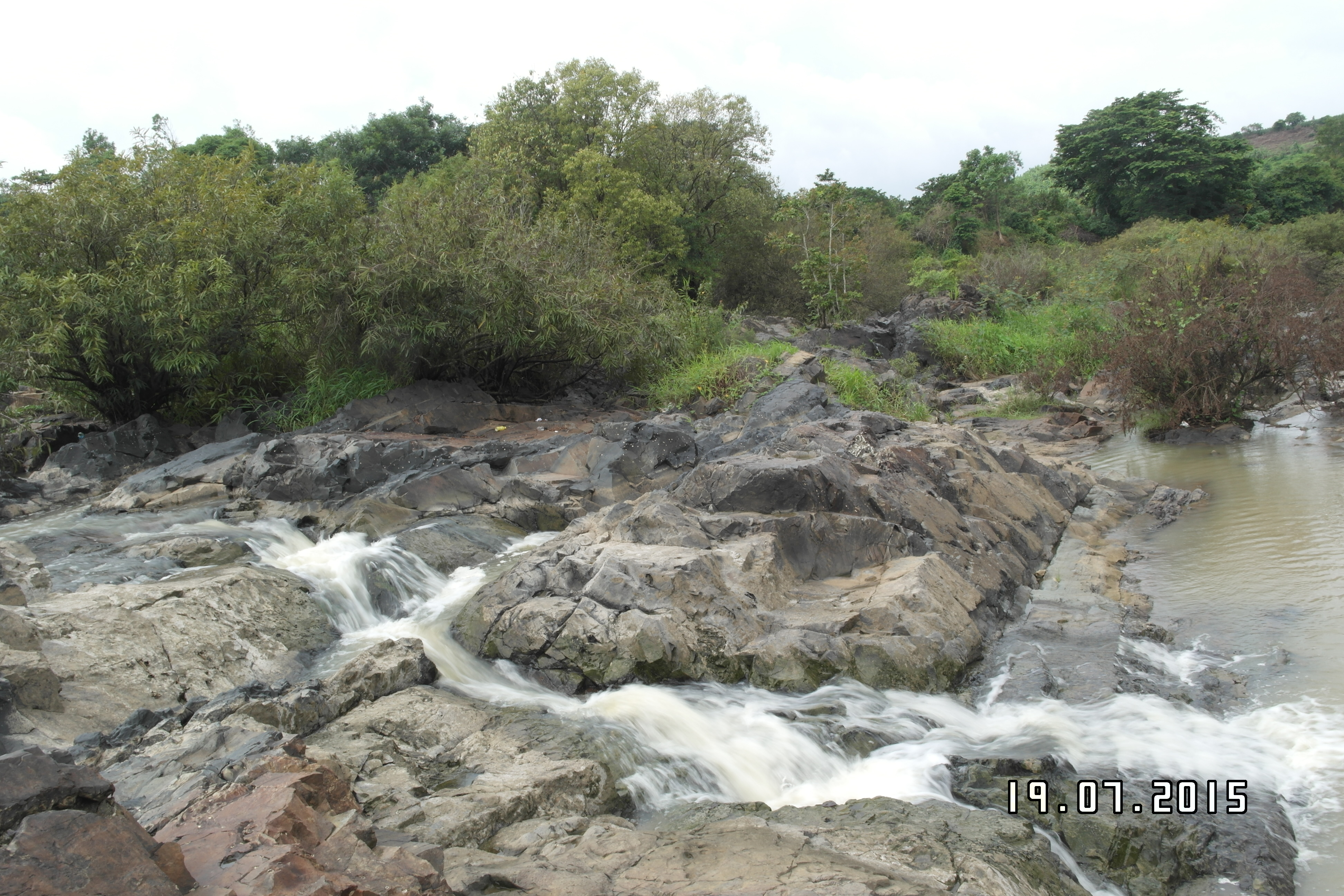
- Sông Ray Waterfall
- Interactive map of Xuân Sơn
- Coordinates: 10°38′25″N 107°19′11″E
- Country: Vietnam
- Municipality: Ho Chi Minh City
- Established: June 16, 2025

Area
  - Total: 28.50 sq mi (73.81 km^{2})

Population (2024)
  - Total: 27,368
  - Density: 960.3/sq mi (370.8/km^{2})
- Time zone: UTC+07:00 (Indochina Time)
- Administrative code: 26584

Xuân Sơn (Vietnamese: Xã Xuân Sơn) is a commune of Ho Chi Minh City, Vietnam. It is one of the 168 new wards, communes and special zones of the city following the reorganization in 2025.

== Geography ==
According to Official Dispatch No. 2896/BNV-CQĐP dated May 27, 2025 of the Ministry of Home Affairs, following the merger, Xuân Sơn has a land area of 73.81 km², the population as of December 31, 2024 is 27,368 people, the population density is 370 people/km².

== History ==
On June 16, 2025, the National Assembly Standing Committee issued Resolution No. 1685/NQ-UBTVQH15 on the arrangement of commune-level administrative units of Ho Chi Minh City in 2025 (effective from June 16, 2025). Accordingly, the entire land area and population of Suối Rao, Sơn Bình and Xuân Sơn communes of the former Châu Đức district will be integrated into a new commune named Xuân Sơn (Clause 158, Article 1).
