= Phước Thắng =

Phước Thắng Phường Phước Thắng
- Ward
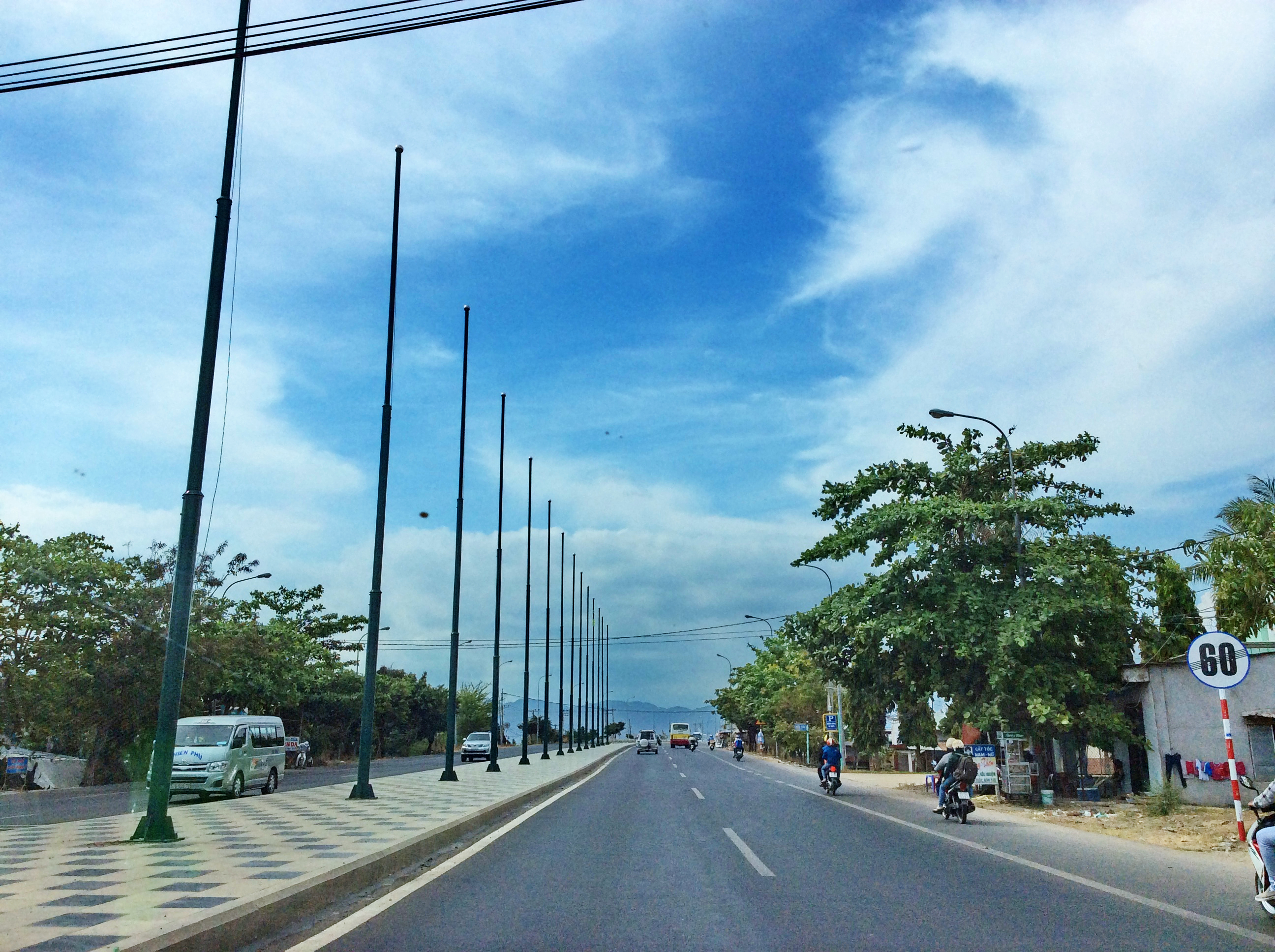
- National Route 51 in Phước Thắng
- Interactive map of Phước Thắng
- Coordinates: 10°25′06″N 107°09′48″E
- Country: Vietnam
- Municipality: Ho Chi Minh City
- Established: June 16, 2025

Area
  - Total: 18.28 sq mi (47.35 km^{2})

Population (December 2024)
  - Total: 52,580
  - Density: 2,876/sq mi (1,110/km^{2})
- Time zone: UTC+07:00 (Indochina Time)
- Administrative code: 26542

Phước Thắng (Vietnamese: Phường Phước Thắng) is a ward of Ho Chi Minh City, Vietnam. It is one of the 168 new wards, communes and special zones of the city following the reorganization in 2025.

== Geography ==
According to Official Dispatch No. 2896/BNV-CQĐP dated May 27, 2025 of the Ministry of Home Affairs, following the merger, Phước Thắng has a land area of 47.35 km², the population as of December 31, 2024 is 52,580 people, the population density is 1,110 people/km².

== History ==
On June 16, 2025, the National Assembly Standing Committee issued Resolution No. 1685/NQ-UBTVQH15 on the arrangement of commune-level administrative units of Ho Chi Minh City in 2025 (effective from June 16, 2025). Accordingly, the entire land area and population of Ward 11 and Ward 12 of the former Vũng Tàu city will be integrated into a new ward named Phước Thắng (Clause 105, Article 1).
