= Dinh Hills =

Coordinates: 10°32′12″N 107°08′06″E

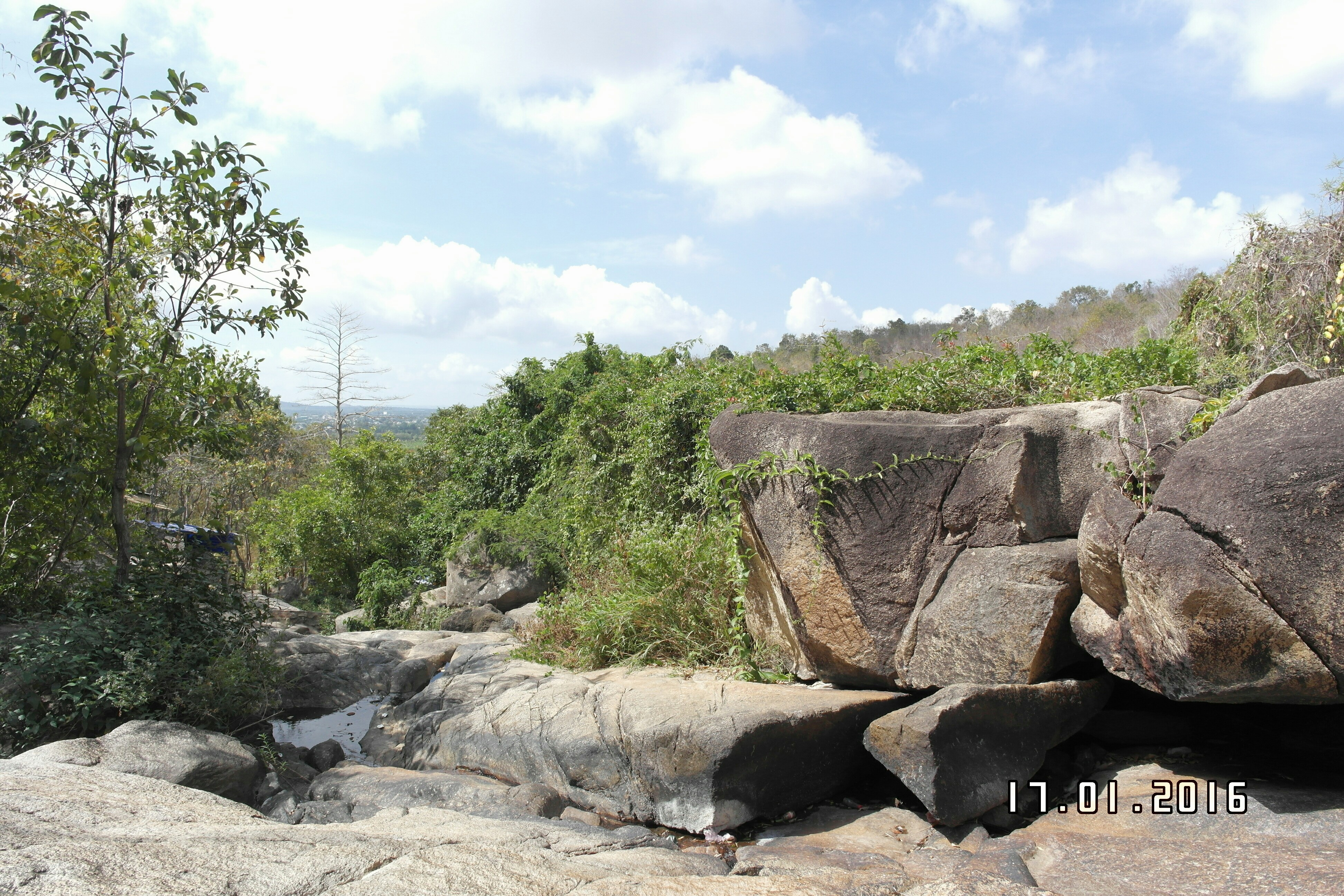
Dinh Hills near Bà Rịa

The Dinh Hills (Núi Dinh) are hills that are located in Long Hương, northwest of Bà Rịa, in the Bà Rịa–Vũng Tàu province (now is Ho Chi Minh City), Vietnam.

During the Vietnam War, the Dinh hills were a Viet Cong base area which fought against the 1st Australian Task Force.

== Bibliography ==
- Rowe, John. Vietnam: the Australian experience (Sydney: Time–Life Books Australia and John Ferguson, 1987) ISBN 0-949118-07-9
- https://www.anbuiphotography.com/2022/08/dinh-hills-nui-dinh-ideal-place-to-back.html
