= Kim Cliett Long =

American author and educator

- Born: December 10, 1960 (age 64); Macon, Georgia
- Citizenship: American
- Education: Doctor of Education (Ed.D.) in Organizational Leadership from Northcentral University; MSc. in Early Childhood Public Policy and Advocacy, Mountain State University
- Occupations: Educator; Historian; Author
- Website: https://kimcliettlong.com/

Kim Cliett Long (born 10 December 1960) is an American author and educator who served as a professor of Organizational Management at Wiley University.

== Education ==
Long earned her Doctor of Education (Ed.D.) in Organizational Leadership from Northcentral University. She also holds a Master of Science degree from Mountain State University in Interdisciplinary Studies, focusing on Early Childhood Public Policy and Advocacy. Additionally, she is certified as a Distance Learning Specialist by the University of West Georgia.

== Career ==
=== Academic career ===
Long served as Associate Provost for Administration, Extended Education and as a Professor of Organizational Management at Wiley College. She also directed the Center for Excellence in Distance Learning (CEDL) at Wiley College, an initiative aimed at assisting Historically Black Colleges and Universities (HBCUs) in developing high-quality online programs. Under her leadership, the CEDL selected Canvas as the preferred learning management system for its online courses.

=== Lowcountry Rice Culture Project ===
Beyond her academic roles, Long serves as the Executive Director of the Lowcountry Rice Culture Project (LRCP), founded in 2010 by artist Jonathan Green. LRCP aims to explore the shared cultural inheritance of the southeastern Lowcountry rice legacy.

=== Board memberships and editorial roles ===
Long served on the transition team for Governor Jeb Bush during his second term and received gubernatorial appointments to the boards of Edison State College (now Florida Southwestern State College), the Florida Fund for Minority Teachers, and the Florida Education Foundation Board. She has also been a member of the Florida Humanities Council.

Long served on the advisory board of Campus Technology magazine and on the editorial board of the International Journal of Communication Technology for Social Networks. She was also an associate editor for the Electronic Journal of e-Learning and guest-edited a special issue on research methodologies in e-learning.

== Books authored ==
- African American Military Women Trailblazers (2021): Portrays ambitious African American women who served the US military.
- An Alphabet Salute To The Military (2021): different duties and responsibilities that soldiers carry out in the armed forces.
- The First Marketplace: Africa’s Role in Shaping World Trade (2025)
