= Bà Rịa (ward) =

Bà Rịa Phường Bà Rịa Phước Lễ
- Ward
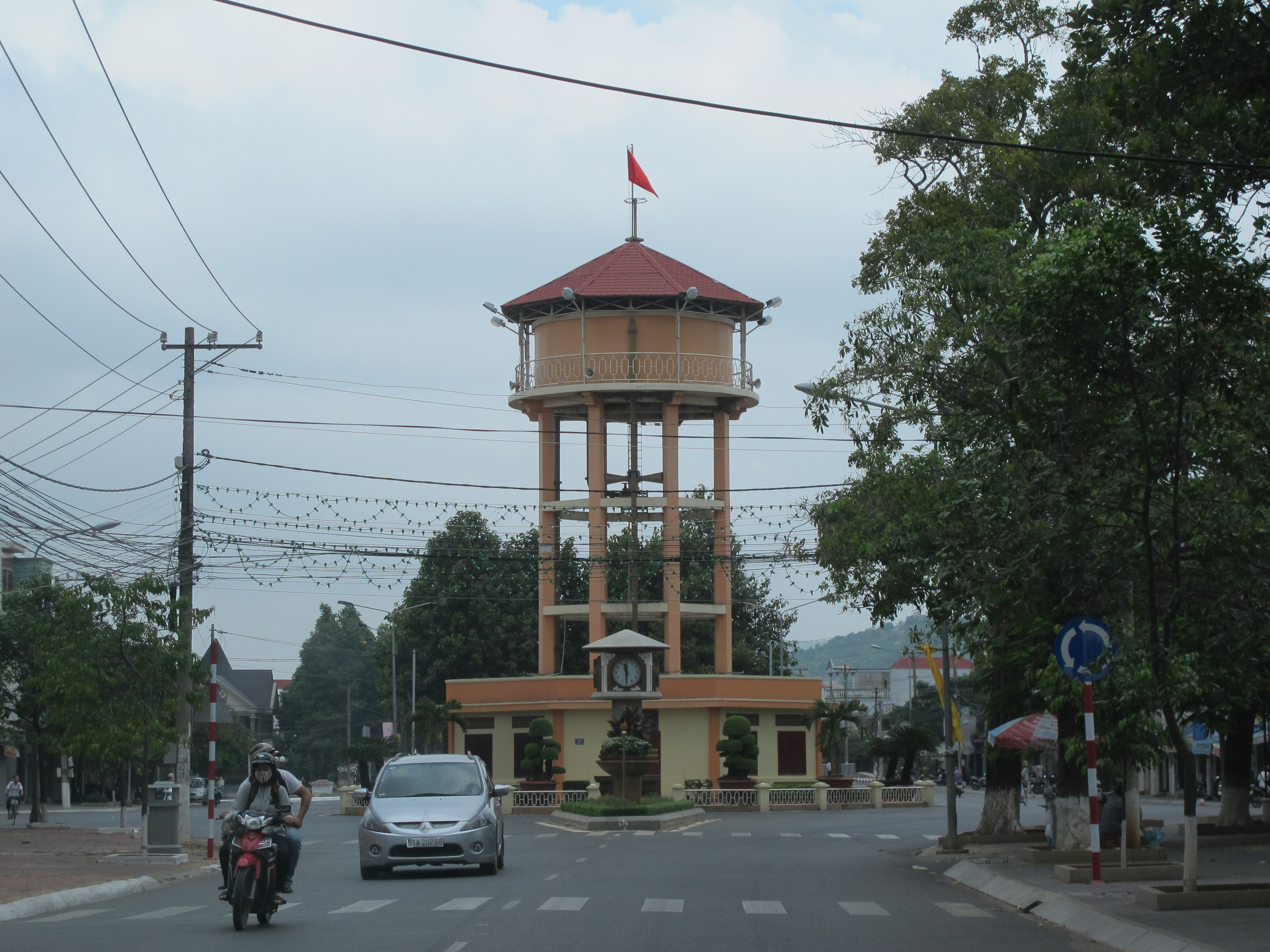
- The Roundhouse in Bà Rịa
- Interactive map of Bà Rịa
- Coordinates: 10°29′56″N 107°10′04″E
- Country: Vietnam
- Municipality: Ho Chi Minh City
- Established: June 16, 2025

Area
  - Total: 6.00 sq mi (15.55 km^{2})

Population (2024)
  - Total: 52,265
  - Density: 8,705/sq mi (3,361/km^{2})
- Time zone: UTC+07:00 (Indochina Time)
- Administrative code: 26560

Bà Rịa (Vietnamese: Phường Bà Rịa) is a ward of Ho Chi Minh City, Vietnam. It is one of the 168 new wards, communes and special zones of the city following the reorganization in 2025.

Bà Rịa ward corresponds to the historic downtown of Bà Rịa, the capital city of the former Bà Rịa–Vũng Tàu province.

== Geography ==
Bà Rịa is about 70 km away to the Southeast of Saigon and Vũng Tàu about 20 km away to the East, it lies between the route of Saigon – Vũng Tàu by road (National Route 51, from Ben Luc – Long Thanh Expressway or Ho Chi Minh City–Long Thanh–Dau Giay Expressway to Bien Hoa–Vung Tau Expressway). This is the central ward of the Bà Rịa–Vũng Tàu region (or Region 3) of Ho Chi Minh City and adjacent to:

- Tam Long to the north by Road No. 5 - Mô Xoài, Hùng Vương and Võ Thị Sáu Stteet
- Long Hương to west by Dinh River
- Phước Thắng to the south by Cỏ May River
- Long Điền to the east by Bien Hoa–Vung Tau Expressway.

According to Official Dispatch No. 2896/BNV-CQĐP dated May 27, 2025 of the Ministry of Home Affairs, following the merger, Bà Rịa has a land area of 15.55 km², the population as of December 31, 2024 is 52,265 people, the population density is 3,361 people/km².

== Administration divisions ==
As of July 1, 2026, Bà Rịa Ward is divided into 15 neighborhoods: Phước Lễ, Phước Trung, Phước Liên, Phước Hiệp, Phước Chánh, Phước Hưng, Phước Nguyên, Phước Thành, Lập Thành, Phước Đức, Long Kiên, Phước Hạnh, Long Toàn, Long Tâm, and Bến Súc.

== History ==
On June 16, 2025, the National Assembly Standing Committee issued Resolution No. 1685/NQ-UBTVQH15 on the arrangement of commune-level administrative units of Ho Chi Minh City in 2025 (effective from June 16, 2025). Accordingly, the entire land area and population of Phước Trung, Phước Hưng, Phước Nguyên and Long Toàn wards of the former Bà Rịa city will be integrated into a new ward named Bà Rịa (Clause 107, Article 1).

In the 2025 administrative reorganization of communes, in order to commemorate and express gratitude to the ancestors who contributed to the development, preservation, and protection of the land of present-day Ba Ria - Vung Tau, Ba Ria - Vung Tau province in particular and Ho Chi Minh City in general have chosen new commune and ward names associated with famous tourist destinations, possessing long-standing historical and cultural elements, revolutionary lands, etc., like Bà Rịa, Vũng Tàu, Đất Đỏ, Hồ Tràm,...

== Historical sites and landmarks ==
- Cathedral of Sts. James and Philip
- Saint Paul Convent
- Phước Thạnh Pagoda
- Hưng Lễ Pagoda
- Bà Thiên Hậu Pagoda
- Bà Bến Súc Shrine

== Gallery ==
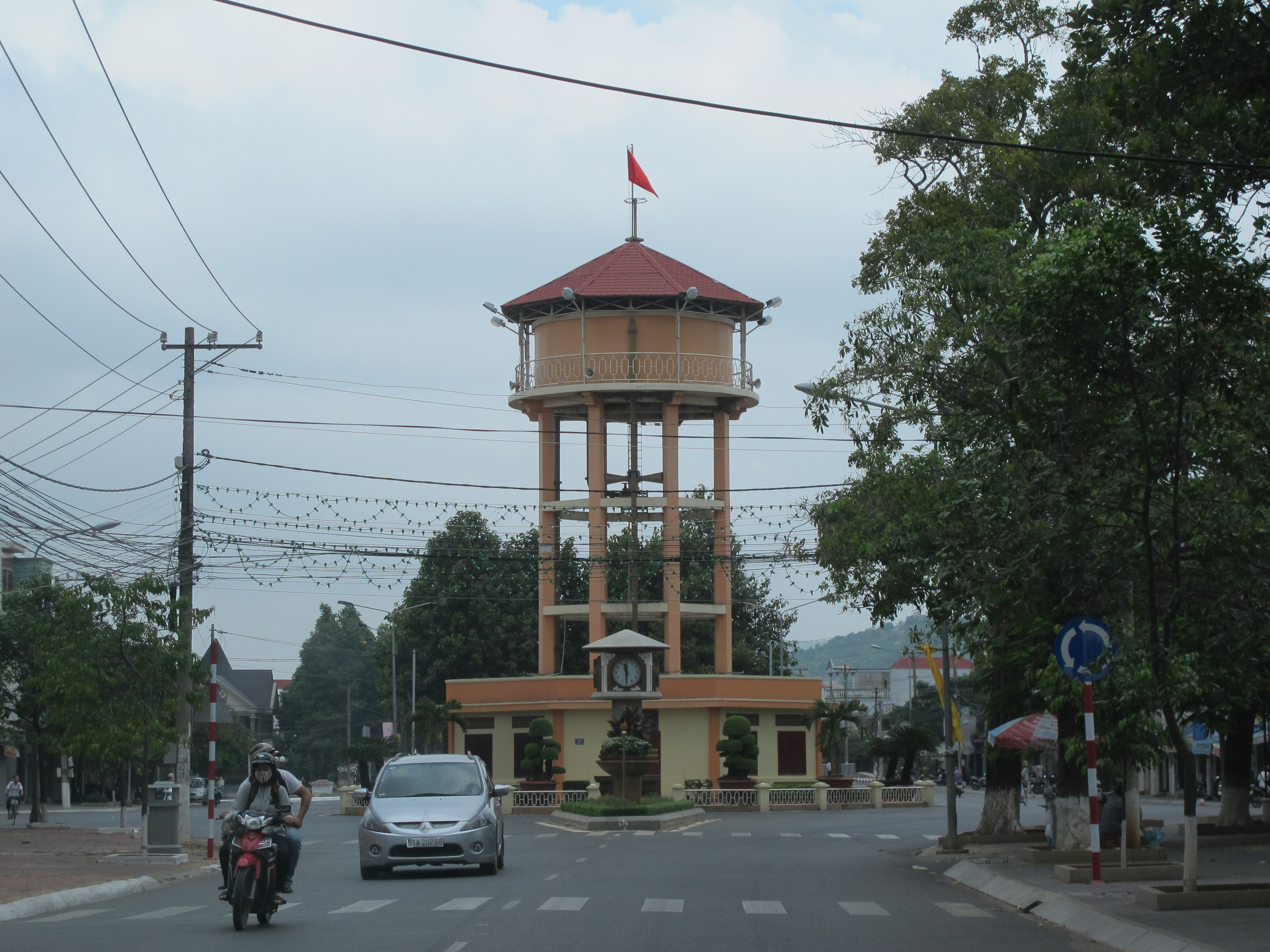
Bà Rịa Round House Relic

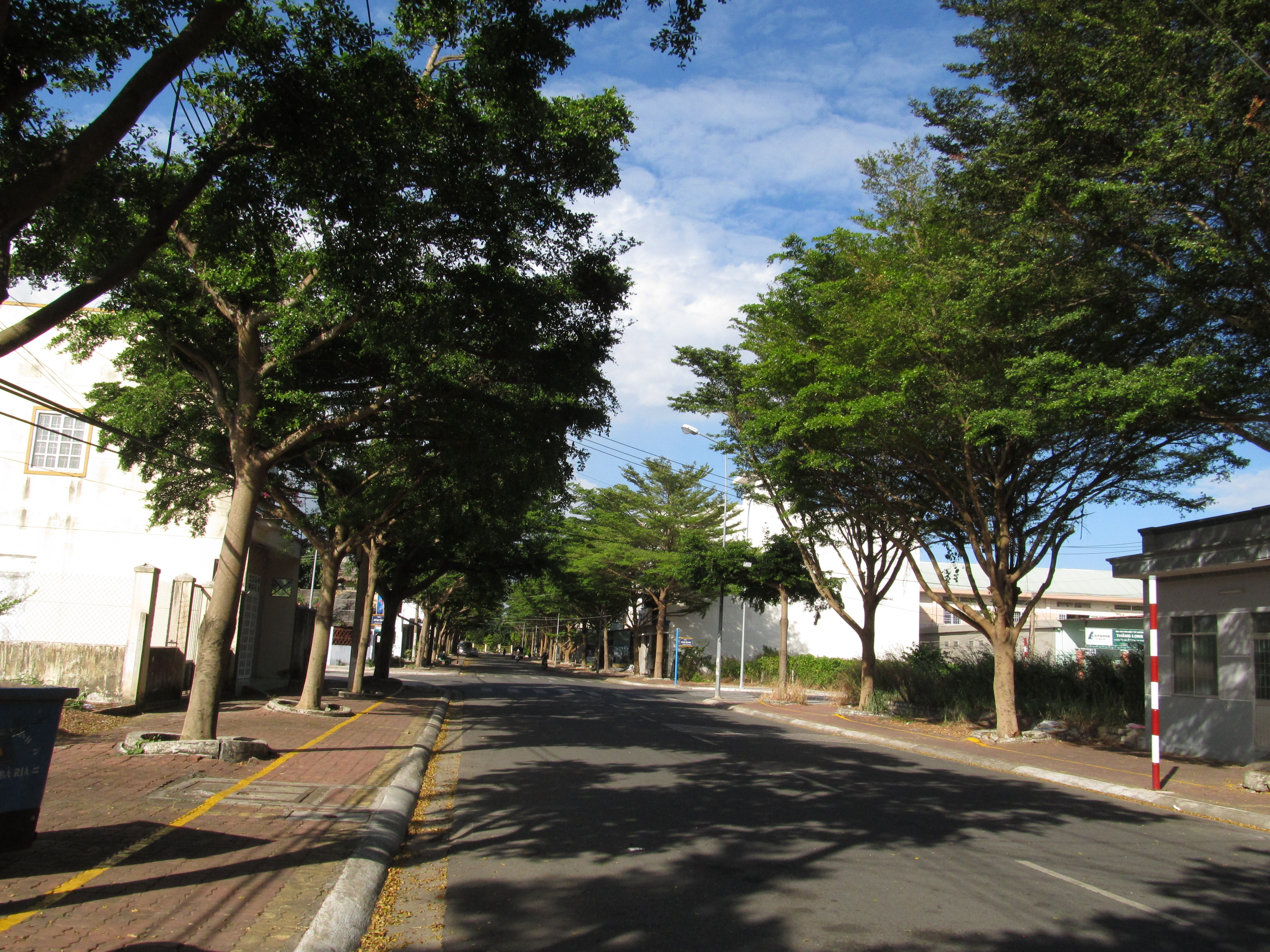
A row of Thai almond trees on Lê Duẩn Street.

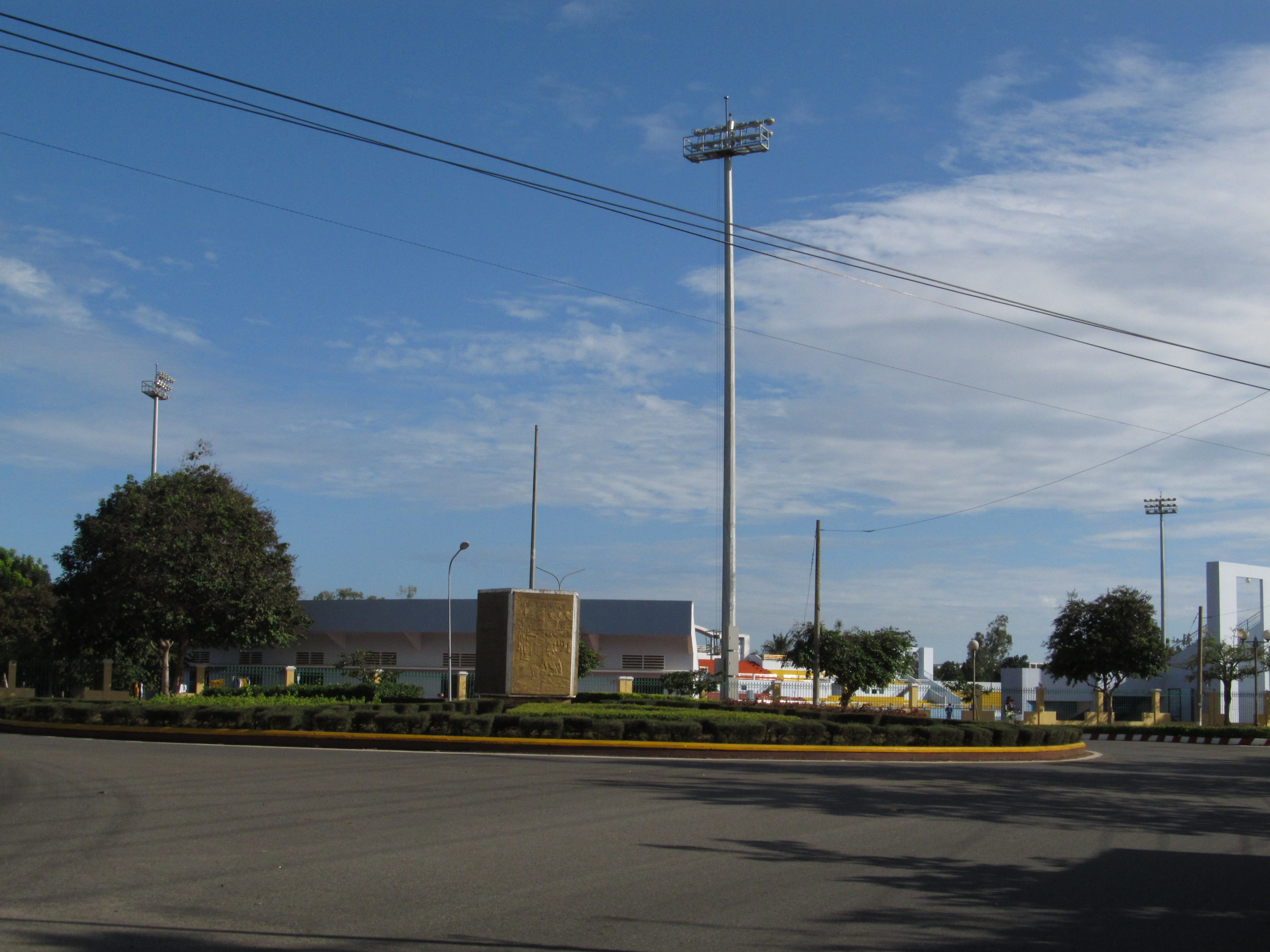
Bà Rịa Stadium Roundabout

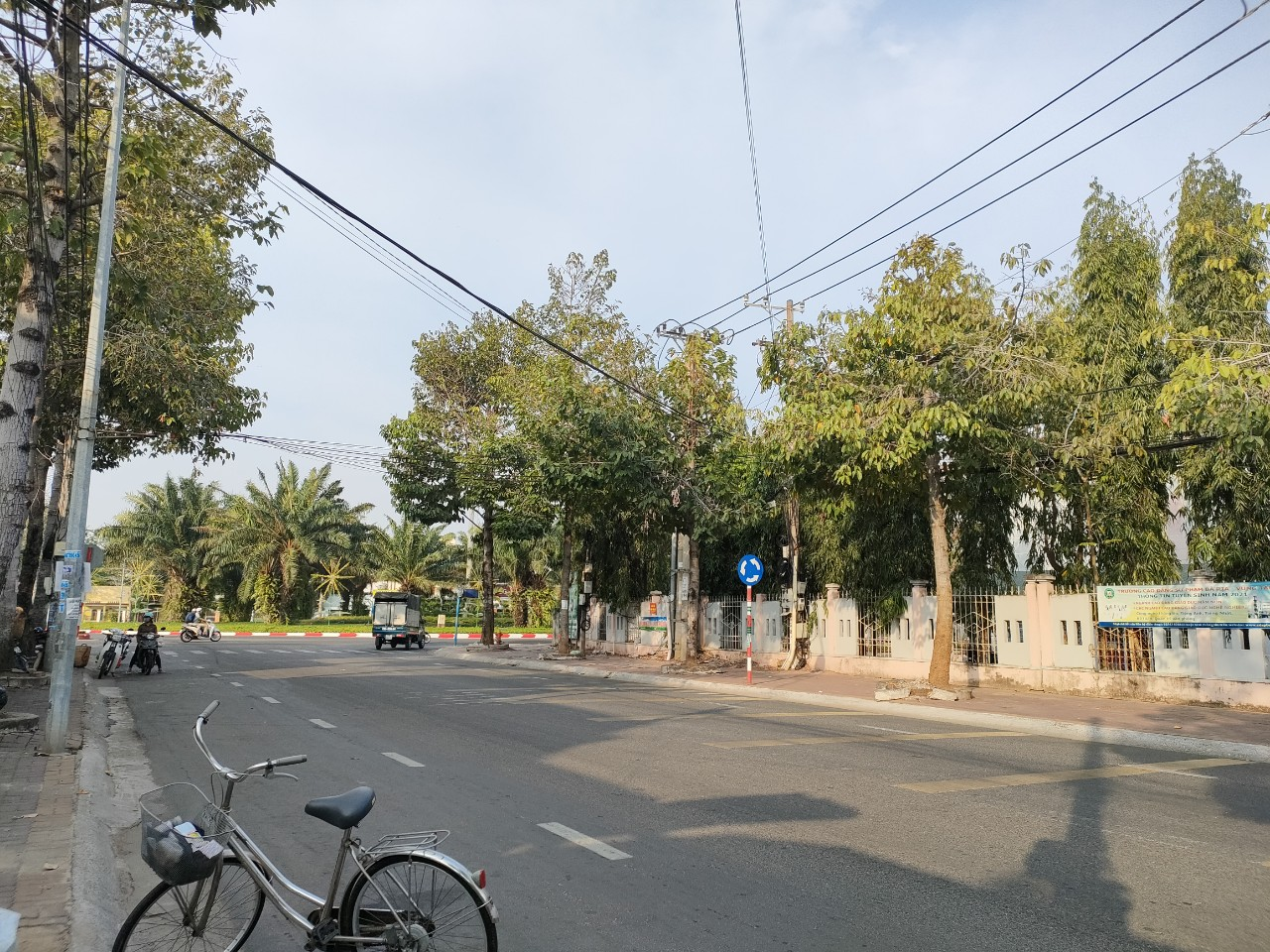
Nguyễn Văn Cừ Street

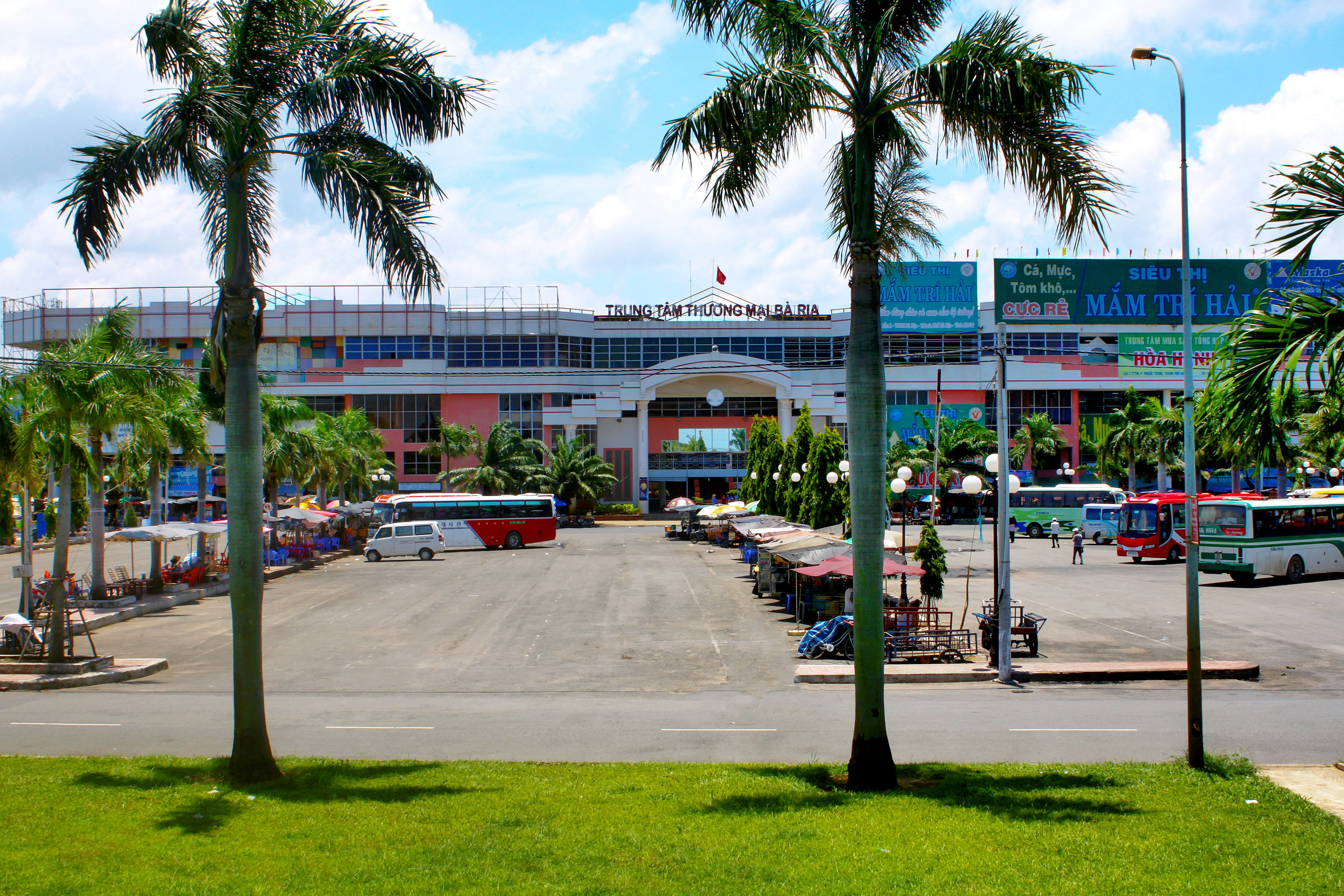
Bà Rịa Shopping Center
