= Châu Đức district =

Coordinates: 10°38′27″N 107°14′39″E

Châu Đức District Huyện Châu Đức
- District
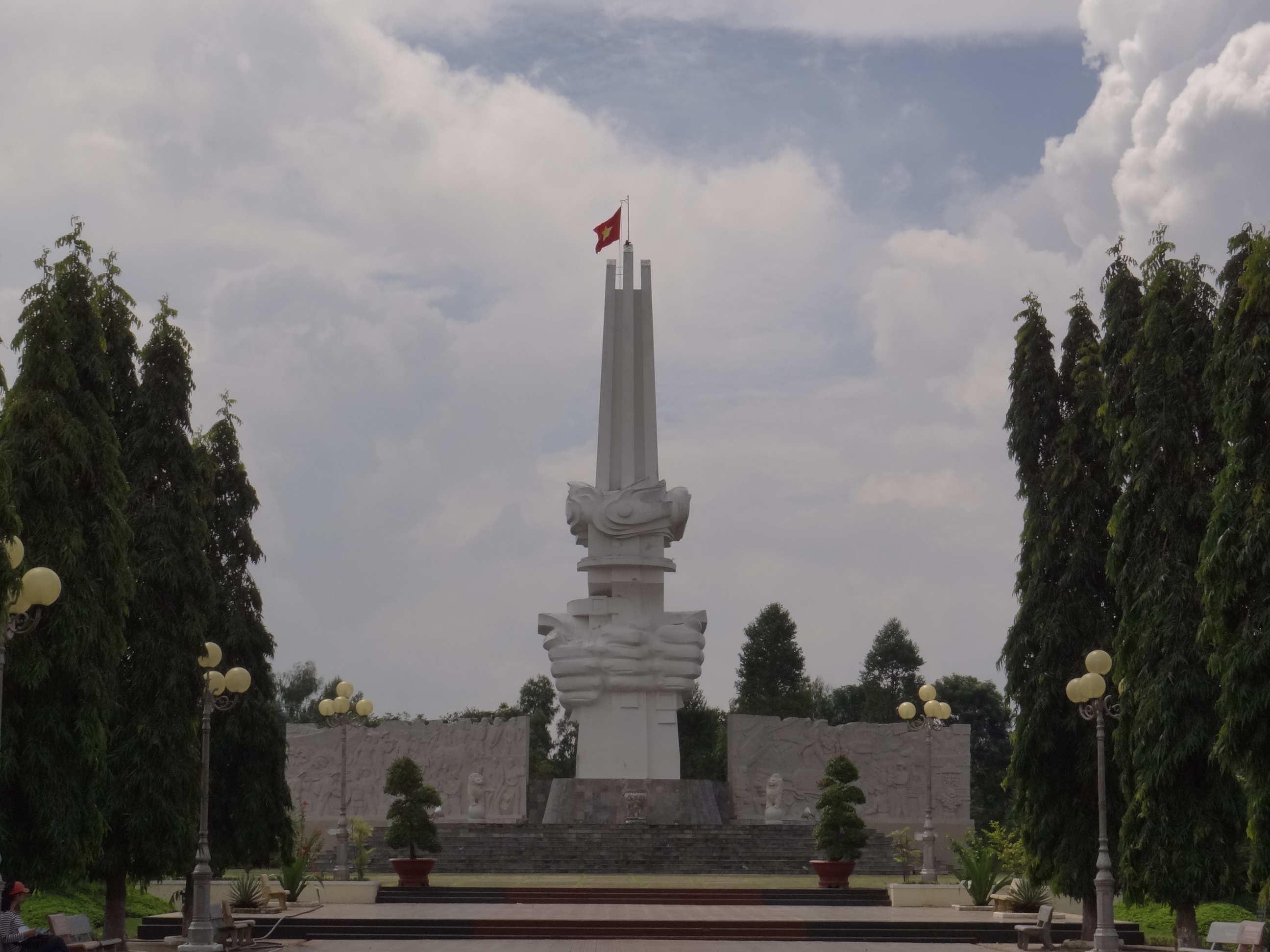
- Interactive map of Châu Đức District
- Country: Vietnam
- Region: Southeast
- Province: Bà Rịa–Vũng Tàu
- Capital: Ngãi Giao

Area
  - District: 163 sq mi (421 km^{2})

Population (2019 census)
  - District: 143,859
  - Density: 885/sq mi (342/km^{2})
  - Urban: 16,472
  - Rural: 127,387
- Time zone: UTC+7 (Indochina Time)

Châu Đức is a former rural district of Bà Rịa–Vũng Tàu province in the Southeast region of Vietnam. As of 2019 the district had a population of 143,859. The district covers an area of 421 km^{2} (163 sq mi). The district capital lies at Ngãi Giao.

There are some natural sights here such as Bàu Sen and the Xuân Sơn waterfall.

== Administrative divisions ==
The district is subdivided to 16 commune-level subdivisions, including the township of Ngãi Giao and the rural communes of: Cù Bị, Kim Long, Xà Bang, Quảng Thành, Láng Lớn, Bàu Chinh, Bình Ba, Suối Nghệ, Bình Trung, Bình Giã, Xuân Sơn, Sơn Bình, Suối Rao, Đá Bạc and Nghĩa Thành.
