= Bà Rịa (disambiguation) =

Bà Rịa may refer to:

- Bà Rịa (city): former city in Bà Rịa - Vũng Tàu province
- Bà Rịa, Ho Chi Minh City: ward in Ho Chi Minh City
