= Bình Giã =

Bình Giã Xã Bình Giã
- Commune
- Interactive map of Bình Giã
- Coordinates: 10°38′27″N 107°17′19″E
- Country: Vietnam
- Municipality: Ho Chi Minh City
- Established: June 16, 2025

Area
  - Total: 25.85 sq mi (66.96 km^{2})

Population (2024)
  - Total: 34,262
  - Density: 1,325/sq mi (511.7/km^{2})
- Time zone: UTC+07:00 (Indochina Time)
- Administrative code: 26590

Bình Giã (Vietnamese: Xã Bình Giã) is a commune of Ho Chi Minh City, Vietnam. It is one of the 168 new wards, communes and special zones of the city following the reorganization in 2025.

== Geography ==
According to Official Dispatch No. 2896/BNV-CQĐP dated May 27, 2025 of the Ministry of Home Affairs, following the merger, Bình Giã has a land area of 66.96 km², the population as of December 31, 2024 is 34,262 people, the population density is 511 people/km².

== History ==
Bình Giã was the site of the Battle of Binh Gia that took place at the end of 1964. The battle was one of the first large-scale engagements between the Army of the Republic of Vietnam and the National Liberation Front or Viet Cong.

On June 16, 2025, the National Assembly Standing Committee issued Resolution No. 1685/NQ-UBTVQH15 on the arrangement of commune-level administrative units of Ho Chi Minh City in 2025 (effective from June 16, 2025). Accordingly, the entire land area and population of Bình Giã, Bình Trung and Quảng Thành communes of the former Châu Đức district will be integrated into a new commune named Bình Giã (Clause 157, Article 1).
