= Ngãi Giao =

Ngãi Giao Xã Ngãi Giao
- Commune
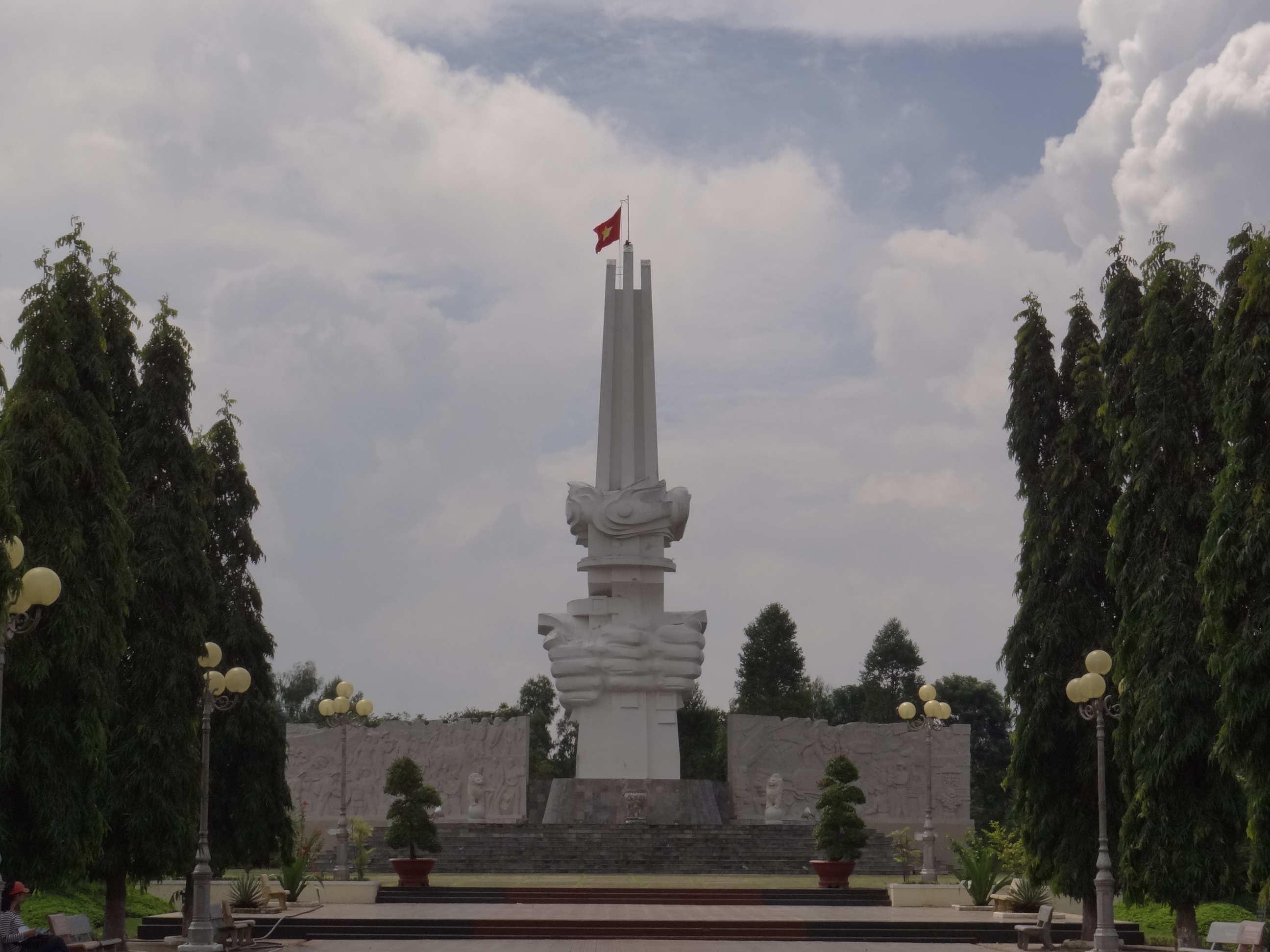
- Bình Giã Memorial
- Interactive map of Ngãi Giao
- Coordinates: 10°38′26″N 107°14′52″E
- Country: Vietnam
- Municipality: Ho Chi Minh City
- Established: June 16, 2025

Area
  - Total: 26.76 sq mi (69.30 km^{2})

Population (2024)
  - Total: 49,065
  - Density: 1,834/sq mi (708.0/km^{2})
- Time zone: UTC+07:00 (Indochina Time)
- Administrative code: 26575

Ngãi Giao (Vietnamese: Xã Ngãi Giao) is a commune of Ho Chi Minh City, Vietnam. It is one of the 168 new wards, communes and special zones of the city following the reorganization in 2025.

== Geography ==
According to Official Dispatch No. 2896/BNV-CQĐP dated May 27, 2025 of the Ministry of Home Affairs, following the merger, Ngãi Giao has a land area of 69.30 km², the population as of December 31, 2024 is 49,065 people, the population density is 708 people/km².

== History ==
On June 16, 2025, the National Assembly Standing Committee issued Resolution No. 1685/NQ-UBTVQH15 on the arrangement of commune-level administrative units of Ho Chi Minh City in 2025 (effective from June 16, 2025). Accordingly, the entire land area and population of Ngãi Giao township and Bình Ba, Suối Nghệ communes of the former Châu Đức district will be integrated into a new commune named Ngãi Giao (Clause 154, Article 1).
