= Dinh River =

River in Vietnam

The Dinh River (Vietnamese: Sông Dinh) is a river in Vietnam. It flows for 40 kilometres through Bà Rịa–Vũng Tàu province.
