= Ministry of Home Affairs (Vietnam) =

Government ministry of Vietnam

Socialist Republic of Vietnam Ministry of Home Affairs
- Bộ Nội vụ

Ministry overview
- Formed: 28 August 1945
- Preceding Ministry: Ministry of Home Affairs (1945-1998) Commission of Organization of Government (1973-1990) Commission of Organization and Cadres of Government (1990-1992) Commission of Government Organization and Cadres (1992-2002) Ministry of Home Affairs (2002-)
- Type: Government Ministry
- Jurisdiction: Government of Vietnam
- Headquarters: 8 Tôn Thất Thuyết Street, Từ Liêm Ward, Hanoi
- Annual budget: 654.258 millions VND (2018)
- Minister responsible: Nguyễn Tiến Hải (Acting)
- Deputy Minister responsible: Vũ Chiến Thắng Trương Hải Long Cao Huy Nguyễn Thị Hà Nguyễn Văn Hồi Nguyễn Mạnh Khương
- Website: moha.gov.vn

The Ministry of Home Affairs (MOHA, Vietnamese: Bộ Nội vụ) is a government ministry in Vietnam responsible for: organisational structure of state administration; local government organisations, management of administrative boundaries; officials, public servants and state employees; NGOs; state archives and state administration of public services.

== Units ==
- Department of Organisation and Personnel
- Department of Local Government
- Department of Civil Servants – Public Employees
- Department of Remunerations
- Department of Non-governmental Organisations
- Department of Administrative Reforms
- Department of Youth Affairs
- Department of Planning and Finance
- Department of International Cooperation
- Department of Legislation
- Office of the Ministry
- Ministry Inspectorate
- Government Committee for Religious Affairs
- Central Committee for Emulation and Reward
- Bureau of State Records Management and Archives
- Information Centre
- Institute for State Organisational Sciences
- State Organisation Magazine
