= Đất Đỏ district =

Coordinates: 10°28′40″N 107°18′27″E

Đất Đỏ district Huyện Đất Đỏ
- District
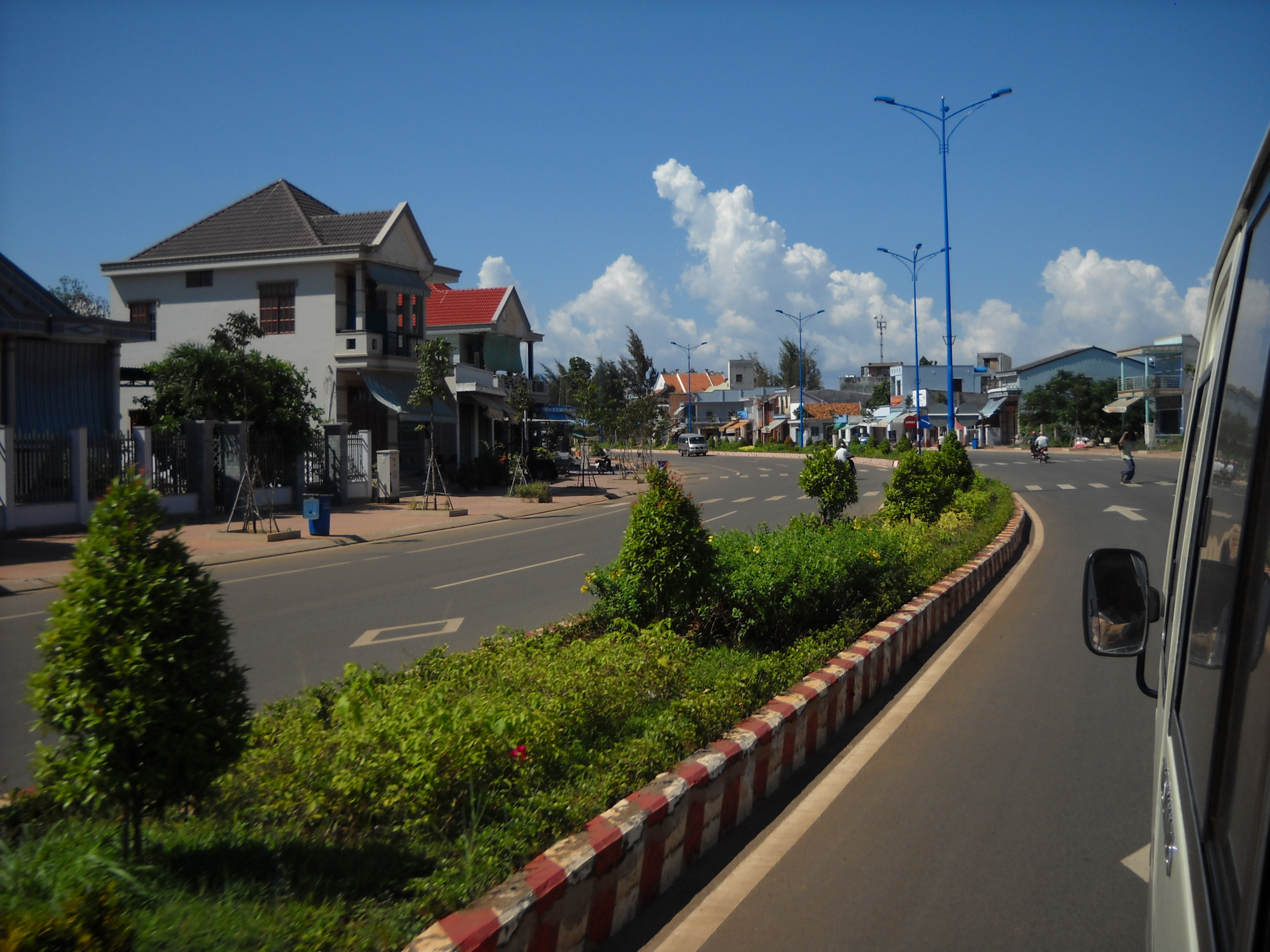
- Đất Đỏ town in Đất Đỏ District
- Interactive map of Đất Đỏ district
- Country: Vietnam
- Region: South East
- Province: Bà Rịa–Vũng Tàu
- Capital: Thị trấn Đất Đỏ

Area
  - Total: 73 sq mi (190 km^{2})

Population (2019 census)
  - Total: 73,530
  - Density: 1,000/sq mi (390/km^{2})
- Time zone: UTC+7 (Indochina Time)

Đất Đỏ is a former rural district of Bà Rịa–Vũng Tàu province in the Southeast region of Vietnam. As of 2019, the district had a population of 73,530. The district covers an area of 190 km^{2} (73 sq mi). The district capital lies at Phước Hải.

This district is the home area of the prominent communist Võ Thị Sáu.

== Administrative divisions ==
The district is divided administratively into 2 townships: Đất Đỏ, the capital, and Phước Hải. Đất Đỏ contains the following wards: Phước Long Thọ, Long Tân, Láng Dài, Lộc An, Phước Hội and Long Mỹ.
