= Võ Thị Sáu =

Vietnamese schoolgirl and revolutionary (1933–1952)

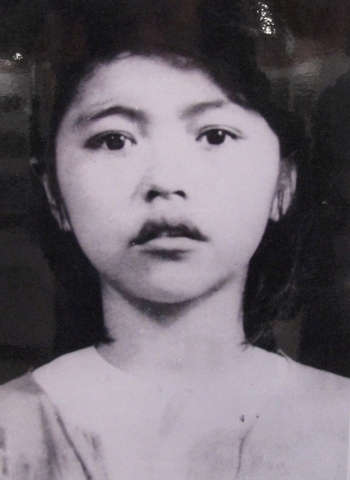
- Portrait of Võ Thị Sáu at the Vung Tau Police Office.
- Born: 1933; Phước Thọ, Đất Đỏ, French Indochina
- Died: 23 January 1952 (aged 18–19); Côn Sơn Prison, Côn Sơn Island, Vietnam
- Cause of death: Execution by firing squad
- Occupations: Nationalist guerrilla, schoolgirl
- Years active: 1948–1952
- Known for: Anti-French guerilla combat, political martyrdom

Võ Thị Sáu (1933 – 23 January 1952) was a teenager who fought as a guerrilla during the First Indochina War participating in the resistance movement against the French colonists for Vietnam’s independence. She carried out multiple assassination attempts targeting French officers and Pro-French Vietnamese individuals collaborating with the colonial government in Southern Vietnam at the time. She was captured, tried, convicted, and executed by the French in 1952, becoming the first woman to be executed at Côn Đảo Prison.

Today in Vietnam she is considered a symbolic national revolutionary martyr and heroine. The Vietnamese government posthumously awarded her the title of Hero of the People's Armed Forces in 1993.

== Early life ==
Võ Thị Sáu was born in 1933 to Võ Văn Hợi and Nguyễn Thị Đậu. Her birthplace was in Đất Đỏ Commune, Ho Chi Minh City. She was born into a poor family. Her father worked as a horse-cart driver transporting passengers between Long Điền and Phước Hải, while her mother sold bún bì chả (a type of noodle dish) at Đất Đỏ Market. At the age of four, her family rented a house in a row of market buildings constructed by the village. (This house, now located in Đất Đỏ Town, has since been restored by the Vietnamese government as a memorial site.) As a child, she began working early to help her parents earn a living and survive in harsh times.

=== Joining the resistance movement ===
After the French reoccupied Đất Đỏ in late 1945, Võ Thị Sáu’s older brothers, friends, and relatives left home to join the Việt Minh resistance movement fighting for Vietnamese Independence. She abandoned her studies to help her parents while secretly providing supplies to her brothers, who were part of the Liberation Army of Bà Rịa Province.

In 1946, she followed her brother Võ Văn Me into the resistance and became a courier and saboteur for the local Đất Đỏ Guerrilla Force. She personally participated in multiple grenade attacks against French forces.

In 1947, at just 14 years old, she officially became a member of the Đất Đỏ Guerrilla Force. From that point onward, she took part in several grenade attacks and assassinations of French officers and Pro-French Vietnamese collaborators, gaining the admiration and support of the local population. On July 14, 1949, during a French National Day celebration Bastille Day in Đất Đỏ, she was given a grenade with which she managed to kill a French captain and critically wound 12 other French soldiers, where she escaped undetected.

== Capture and death sentence ==
In December 1949, at the Tết Canh Dần (Lunar New Year) market. A Vietnamese Pro-French collaborator, a canton chief of the district, who was known to have managed to get hundreds of young Vietnamese men suspected of being Viet Minh cadres a part of the independence movement executed by reporting to the French. Upon being spotted right in the marketplace, Sau was given the responsibility by her comrades of eliminating the traitor. Since they were low on ammunition, she was given only one hand grenade. It did not explode and she was caught by the French authorities.

After her capture, she was interrogated and imprisoned in Đất Đỏ, Bà Rịa Prison, and later transported to Chí Hòa Prison. In April 1950, a French military tribunal tried her for killing one French officer and 23 others who had collaborated with the French. At the time of her trial, she was still underage, and her defence lawyers argued this as grounds to avoid a death sentence. However, the French military court still sentenced her to execution. This ruling caused widespread outrage, sparking protests both in Vietnam and France due to the anti-war movement. Due to the public backlash, the French authorities delayed carrying out the sentence. She remained imprisoned in Chí Hòa Prison until mid-January 1952, when she was secretly transferred to the Infamous Island of Côn Đảo where she was sent to Côn Đảo Prison a prison built by the French to jail those considered especially dangerous to the French colonial government, she was sentenced to death just upon turning 19.

At 4 AM on January 21, 1952, the French shackled Võ Thị Sáu and took her aboard a transport ship at Bạch Đằng Wharf. The ship sailed through the night, reaching Côn Đảo at dawn a day later. Awaiting at the pier were Major Jarty, the island’s administrator and prison warden, along with a platoon of African and European soldiers and a group of French prison guards. Jarty ordered her to be locked in the solitary confinement cell of the island’s detention center.

At dawn on January 23, 1952, around 5 AM, she was shackled and taken to the warden’s office near Banh I courtyard for a religious ritual. When the priest offered to perform her last rites, she firmly refused, saying, "I am a patriot! I have no sins. It is only you, murderers, who have sins!"

At 7 AM, she was led to Banh III courtyard. When asked if she had any regrets before dying, she calmly and defiantly declared, "I only have one regret, that is not being able to destroy all the colonial invaders and their treacherous lackeys."

At the courtyard she sang "Tiến Quân Ca", the North's national anthem. Thousands of prisoners could also be heard singing to solemnly bid her farewell.

Moments before execution, she requested not to be blindfolded.

"There's no need to blindfold me. Let my eyes see my beloved country until the very last moment. And I have the courage to look straight into the muzzles of your guns!"

She was then executed by firing squad. Her body was buried at Hàng Dương Cemetery in a pre-dug grave.

In the Death Monitoring Book (1947–1954) preserved in Côn Đảo, an entry written in French states: "Le 23 Janvier 1952: 195 G.267 Võ Thị Sáu dite CAM mort 23/1/1952 7h P.Condor Par balles…" (January 23, 1952: Prisoner G.267 Võ Thị Sáu, known as CAM, executed at 7 AM at Poulo Condor (Con Son) by gunfire).

== Legacy ==
After her execution, North Vietnam recognised Võ Thị Sáu as a revolutionary martyr. In 1993, she was posthumously awarded the title Hero of the People's Armed Forces.

In 1995, Hồ Chí Minh City Television produced the film Như một huyền thoại (Like a Legend), depicting her life.

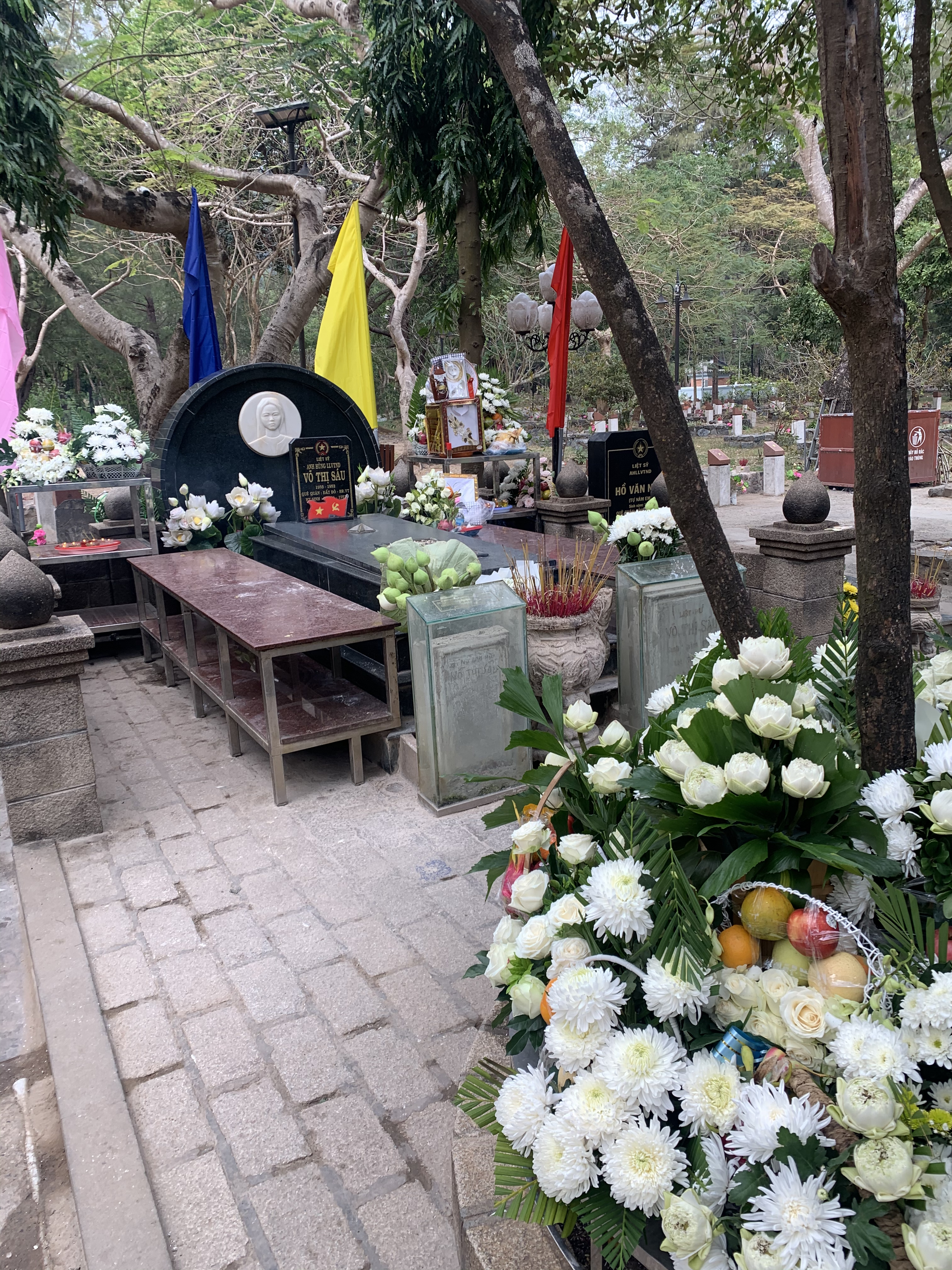
Grave of Võ Thị Sáu on Côn Sơn Island

Her grave at Hàng Dương Cemetery on Côn Đảo has been restored multiple times and is now a famous pilgrimage site. Due to numerous legends of her spirit appearing, her memorial site is frequently filled with offerings. A special midnight ritual at her grave, attended by many visitors, has become a well-known tradition.

The house her family rented in the late 1930s and early 1940s was purchased by the Vietnamese government in the early 1980s, restored to its original state, and designated as a national historical site under Decision No. 15/QĐ-BT on January 27, 1986.

Today, Sáu is considered a nationalist martyr and a symbol of revolutionary spirit. She is venerated by the Vietnamese people as an ancestral spirit, and has amassed almost a cult-like following of devotees who venerate her grave in Hàng Dương Cemetery on Côn Sơn Island. Her name has been given to numerous streets in cities across Vietnam, as well as many schools across the country, including an elementary school in Cuba. At the beginning of 2021, Hồ Chí Minh City merged Wards 6, 7, and 8 of District 3 into a single ward, which was named Võ Thị Sáu Ward. There is also a temple dedicated to her in her hometown of Đất Đỏ, with a street named after her in Bạc Liêu.

A 1958 song Biết ơn chị Võ Thị Sáu (Grateful for Sister Võ Thị Sáu) was composed by Nguyễn Đức Toàn.

The 1996 film Người con gái đất đỏ (The Girl from the Red Land), based on her life, featured singer Thanh Thúy portraying Võ Thị Sáu. She was widely praised for her performance, which was considered a successful portrayal of the historical figure.

== See also ==
- Lê Văn Tám
- Nguyễn Văn Trỗi – Vietnamese revolutionary executed in 1964
- Võ Thị Thắng – Vietnamese revolutionary and stateswoman (1945–2014)
- Yu Gwan-sun – Korean independence activist (1902–1920)
