= Tam Phước (disambiguation) =

Tam Phước may refer to several places in Vietnam, including:

- Tam Phước, Đồng Nai, a ward of Đồng Nai
- Tam Phước, Bến Tre, a former commune of Châu Thành District, Bến Tre
- Tam Phước, Bà Rịa–Vũng Tàu, a former commune of Long Điền District
- Tam Phước, Quảng Nam, a former commune of Phú Ninh District
