= Don Luce (activist) =

American aid worker and activist (1934–2022)

Donald Sanders Luce (September 20, 1934 – November 17, 2022) was an American aid worker and anti-war activist.

== Early life and education ==
Luce was born on September 20, 1934, and raised in East Calais, Vermont. He received a BA from the University of Vermont and a MA from Cornell University in Agricultural Development.

== Career ==
In 1958, Luce moved to Vietnam to work as an agricultural specialist. He became the country director in Vietnam for International Voluntary Services (IVS), a forerunner of the Peace Corps, in 1961. Over the years working in Vietnam, Luce became fluent in the Vietnamese language. In 1967, Luce resigned from IVS along with three other senior staff members to protest the Vietnam War. He wrote an open letter to President Lyndon Johnson, which was also signed by 49 other members of the agency, that criticized US policy and offered recommendations. After returning to the United States, Luce, with other former members of his aid mission, created the Indochina Mobile Education Project, which was affiliated with the Indochina Resource Center. The group toured the US spreading an anti-war message. In 1969, he published Vietnam: The Unheard Voices, coauthored with John Sommer. After publication of the book, Luce returned to Vietnam as a journalist for the World Council of Churches. His knowledge of the Vietnamese language made him a source of information for American reporters.

In 1970, Luce guided members of a congressional delegation, including future congressman and senator Tom Harkin, to Côn Đảo Prison on Con Son Island to reveal the brutal conditions of a prison on the island that housed thousands, including political prisoners. Luce used a hand-drawn map to find a secret door to an area where over 500 starving and tortured men and women were shackled in what were known as "tiger cages" under grates in a walkway. The prisoners were neglected, sitting in diarrhea and with sores around their ankles cut by their shackles. Harkin took photos of the prisoners which were published in Life magazine in the July 17, 1970, issue. The photos caused global condemnation. Luce lost his accreditation as a journalist in South Vietnam shortly afterwards.

After the end of the Vietnam War, Luce returned to the United States and became the director of IVS until 1997. He later became a sociology professor at Niagara County Community College (NCCC) in Sanborn, New York and also worked as public relations director for the local community organization Community Missions of Niagara Frontier in Niagara Falls, New York. He retired in 2018.

== Personal life and death ==
Since 1981, Luce resided in Niagara Falls, New York, with his partner Mark Bonacci, also a professor at NCCC.

Luce died after suffering a sudden cardiac ischemia in Niagara Falls, on November 17, 2022, aged 88.
