= Typhoon Conson (2004) =

Pacific typhoon in 2004

Typhoon Conson (Frank)
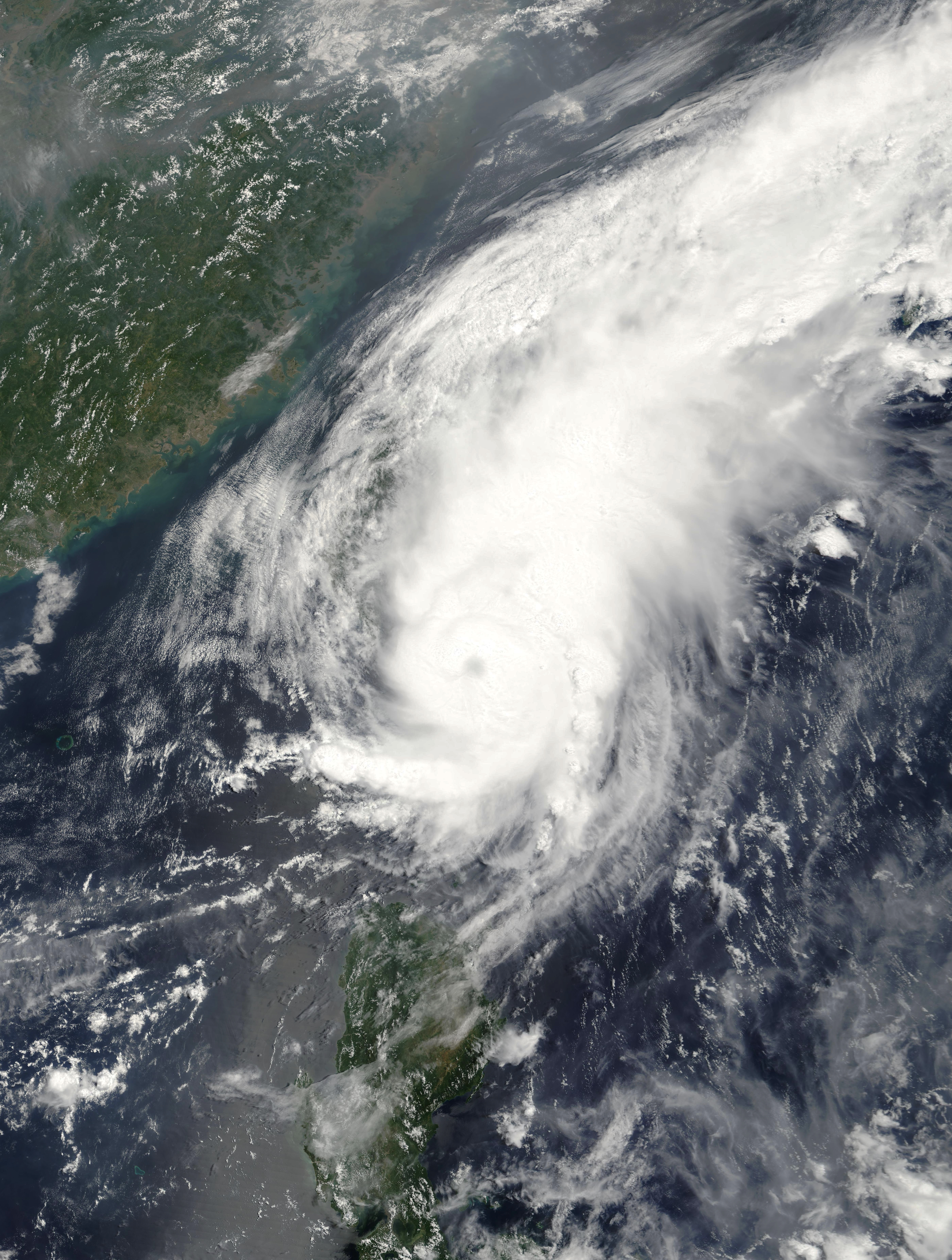
- Conson prior to peak intensity on June 9

Meteorological history
- Formed: June 4, 2004
- Extratropical: June 11, 2004
- Dissipated: June 14, 2004

Typhoon
- 10-minute sustained (JMA)
- Highest winds: 150 km/h (90 mph)
- Lowest pressure: 960 hPa (mbar); 28.35 inHg

Category 3-equivalent typhoon
- 1-minute sustained (SSHWS/JTWC)
- Highest winds: 185 km/h (115 mph)
- Lowest pressure: 944 hPa (mbar); 27.88 inHg

Overall effects
- Fatalities: ≥ 2 total
- Damage: $14.9 million (2004 USD)
- Areas affected: Philippines; Taiwan; Hong Kong; Japan
- IBTrACS
- Part of the 2004 Pacific typhoon season

Typhoon Conson, (Note: The name Conson (Vietnamese: Côn Sơn, [kon˧˧ səːn˧˧]) was contributed by Vietnam and refers to Côn Sơn Island in southern Vietnam.) known in the Philippines as Typhoon Frank, was the first of the record ten typhoons to impact Japan during the 2004 Pacific typhoon season. Developing out of a tropical depression near the northern Philippines in early June, Conson slowly traveled towards the north. Gradually strengthening, the storm reached typhoon status late on June 7 according to the Joint Typhoon Warning Center and several hours later according to the Japan Meteorological Agency. After turning towards the northeast, the typhoon brushed Taiwan and reached its peak intensity with 10-minute sustained winds of 150 km/h (90 mph) on June 9. After reaching its peak, Conson gradually weakened, passing through Okinawa before being downgraded to a tropical storm the next day. On June 11, the storm made landfall as a minimal tropical storm in the Kōchi Prefecture just before becoming extratropical. The extratropical remnants continued towards the northeast and were last mentioned on June 14 crossing the International Date Line.

Typhoon Conson brought heavy rains and high winds to the Philippines, Taiwan, Okinawa, and Japan. Flooding in the Philippines killed two people and caused about PHP1.6 million (US$35,000) in damages. However, some reports state that up to 30 people died in the Philippines. In the Ryukyu Islands, the storm brought heavy rains and high winds to several islands, damaging crops and leaving many without power. As it became extratropical, Conson caused moderate damage in southern Japan, including a few landslides which prompted evacuations. Throughout Japan, losses reached 1.63 billion yen (US$14.9 million).

== Meteorological history ==
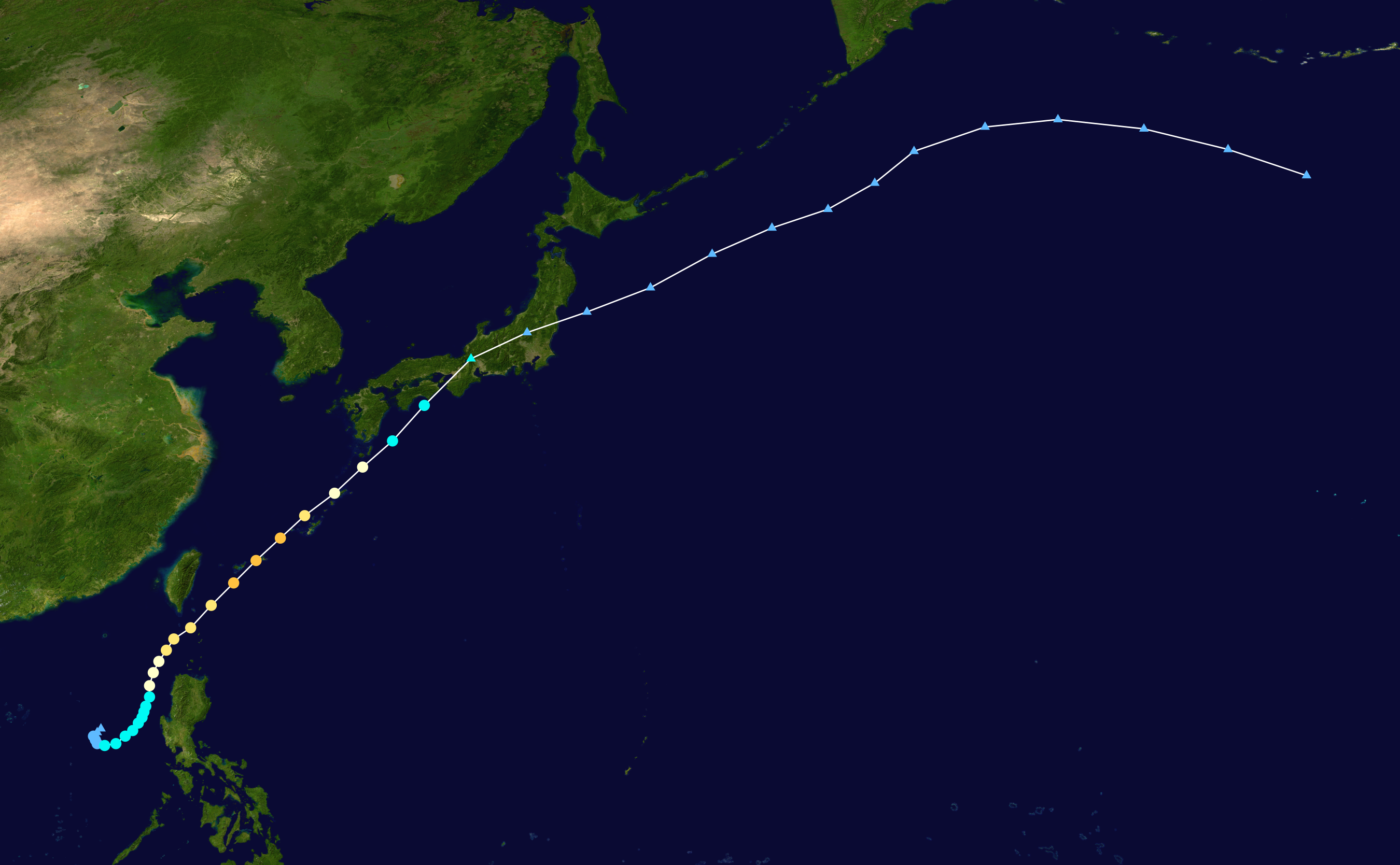
Map plotting the storm's track and intensity, according to the Saffir–Simpson scale Map key Saffir–Simpson scale Tropical depression (≤38 mph, ≤62 km/h) Tropical storm (39–73 mph, 63–118 km/h) Category 1 (74–95 mph, 119–153 km/h) Category 2 (96–110 mph, 154–177 km/h) Category 3 (111–129 mph, 178–208 km/h) Category 4 (130–156 mph, 209–251 km/h) Category 5 (≥157 mph, ≥252 km/h) Unknown Storm type Tropical cyclone Subtropical cyclone Extratropical cyclone, remnant low, tropical disturbance, or monsoon depression

Early on June 4, the Joint Typhoon Warning Center (JTWC) began monitoring an area of low pressure associated with deep convection about 780 km (480 mi) south-southeast of Hong Kong. Later that day, following notable development, they classified the system as Tropical Depression 07W. At the same time, the Japan Meteorological Agency (JMA) also began monitoring the system as a tropical depression. Slowly moving towards the southeast, 07W gradually strengthened, being classified a tropical storm by the JTWC at 1200 UTC the next day. Around the same time, the storm entered the Philippine Atmospheric, Geophysical and Astronomical Services Administration's area of responsibility and was given the local name Frank. Twenty-four hours later, 07W made its closest approach to the Philippines, passing within 295 km (183 mi) of Manila. A few hours later, the JMA upgraded the depression to a tropical storm and gave it the name Conson; a name contributed by Vietnam that is a picturesque place in the country, consisting of a mountain, pine forest, streams, pagodas and many historical monuments.

A ridge located over the central Philippines caused Conson to turn towards the north. Continuing to intensify, the JTWC assessed the storm to have reached typhoon status at 1800 UTC on June 7. The JMA also upgraded the storm to a typhoon about twelve hours later. A 28 km (17 mi) wide eye developed as the cyclone turned towards the northeast. Originally, forecasts showed the typhoon making landfall in southern Taiwan but the turn towards the northeast spared the island from a direct hit. Shortly after being classified as a typhoon by the JMA, the JTWC upgraded Conson to a Category 2 typhoon on the Saffir–Simpson scale with winds of 155 km/h (96 mph) 1-minute winds). The eye later became slightly disorganized and the cloud tops around the center warmed. However, the storm reorganized the next day and was upgraded to a Category 3 typhoon by the JTWC with winds of 185 km/h (115 mph) 1-minute winds). The intensification was the result of the influence of an approaching shortwave trough which enhanced poleward outflow. Around this time, PAGASA issued their final advisory on Typhoon 'Frank' as it moved out of their area of responsibility.

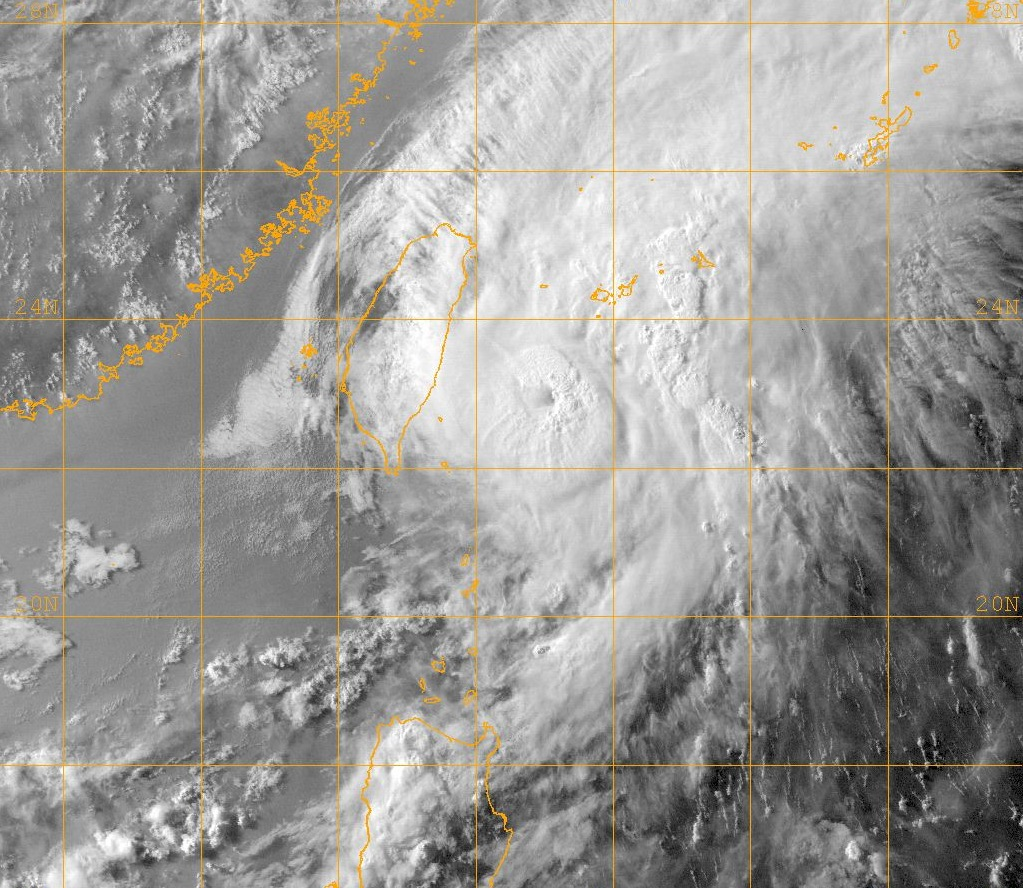
Typhoon Conson near peak intensity on June 9

The strengthening was the result of Conson passing over the warm waters of the Kuroshio Current. The forward motion on the typhoon also began to increase as it interacted with a baroclinic zone. Shortly after, the JMA assessed the storm to have reached its peak intensity with winds of 150 km/h (93 mph) 10-minute winds) and a minimum pressure of 960 hPa (mbar). Later that day, the storm passed over Okinawa as it weakened. By June 10, Conson began to undergo an extratropical transition. Continuing increase in forward speed caused the low to become exposed from shower and thunderstorm activity on the southern edge of the circulation. Around 1200 UTC, the center of circulation became separated from deep convection, leading to the typhoon being downgraded to a tropical storm by both agencies several hours later. Early on June 11, the JTWC reported that the storm had completed its extratropical transition just south of Japan. However, the JMA kept Conson has a tropical cyclone through its landfall in Kōchi Prefecture as a minimal tropical storm. Shortly after landfall, it was classified as an extratropical cyclone. Continuing towards the northeast, the storm remained weak and was last mentioned as it crossed the International Date Line on June 14 near the Aleutian Islands.

The Japan Meteorological Agency uses 10-minute sustained winds, while the Joint Typhoon Warning Center uses 1-minute sustained winds. The conversion factor between the two is 1.14x. JMA's peak intensity for Conson was 150 km/h (93 mph) 10-minute sustained, or 160 km/h (99 mph) 1-minute sustained. The JTWC's peak intensity for Conson was 185 km/h (115 mph) 1-minute sustained, or 155 km/h (96 mph) 10-minute sustained. The National Meteorological Center of China estimated a peak intensity of 150 km/h (93 mph) 10-minute sustained, or 160 km/h (99 mph) 1-minute sustained. The Hong Kong Observatory assessed Conson to be slightly weaker than other agencies, with peak winds estimated at 130 km/h (81 mph) 10-minute sustained, or 150 km/h (93 mph) 1-minute sustained.

== Preparations and impact ==
=== Philippines ===
On June 7, the Philippine Atmospheric, Geophysical and Astronomical Services Administration raised Public Storm Signal No. 1 for most of Luzon. As Conson strengthened into a typhoon, northern areas of Luzon were placed under Public Storm Signal No. 3, resulting in school closures. As the typhoon passed by the Philippines, it dropped heavy rains, peaking at 333.8 mm (13.14 in) in Iba. The highest 24‑hour rainfall was recorded in Subic Bay at 230 mm (9.1 in). Minor flooding and power outages were reported in Manila. These heavy rains led to flooding which reportedly killed 30 people in Luzon. However, the fatalities are uncertain as PAGASA reported that two people were killed by the storm. In all, Conson caused about PHP1.6 million (US35,000) in damage.

=== Taiwan and Hong Kong ===
High winds and heavy rain warnings were issued for most of Taiwan along with sea warnings. Schools and businesses on Orchid Island were suspended on June 9 and 10 as Typhoon Conson passed by. Some domestic flights were cancelled and rail and ferry services were suspended ahead of the storm. When Conson was first classified, Hong Kong was placed under a standby signal as the storm was located within 800 km (500 mi) of the city Only a few showers were reported in the city due to the storm. Taiwanese officials checked water gates throughout the island on June 8 and found that 68 were missing. Water management officials stated that the missing gates could "...wreak unnecessary damage...". The following day, 42 of the missing gates had been replaced. Fishing boats returned to port for shelter during the storm. An emergency operations center was set up to carry out search and rescue missions during and following the typhoon. Heavy rains from the typhoon peaked at 262.5 mm (10.33 in) in Yilan County. The storm caused minor damage and one minor injury as it passed by Taiwan. Although Conson dropped heavy rains across the island, it was not enough to alleviate drought conditions in the southern areas.

=== Japan ===
Wettest tropical cyclones and their remnants in Okinawa Highest-known totals
Precipitation			Storm	Location	Ref.
Rank	mm	in	Storm	Location	Ref.
1	1065.0	41.92	Sinlaku 2008	Yonagunijima	
2	1059.0	41.70	Emma 1956	Kadena Air Force Base	
3	1014.0	41.00	Muifa 2011		
4	575.6	22.66	Charlotte 1959	Naha Air Force Base	
5	535.0	21.06	Bolaven 2012	Kunigami	
6	473.7	18.65	Cora 1969	Kadena Air Force Base	
7	452.0	17.80	Sinlaku 2002	Oku	
8	407.2	16.03	Grace 1961	Kadena Air Force Base	
9	345.0	13.50	Conson 2004	Tarama	
10	342.0	13.46	Kujira 2003		

TRMM satellite image of Conson becoming extratropical on June 10

Traveling towards the northeast, Conson headed towards Okinawa where schools were closed and local transportation was disrupted due to the storm. The Japan Meteorological Agency warned residents about the threat of heavy rains and high winds resulting from the storm. A United States naval base located in Okinawa was placed under a Tropical Cyclone Condition of Readiness (TCCR) Four as Typhoon Conson was approaching. As the storm neared the islands, the naval base was put under TCCR Three, indicating that winds of 92 km/h (57 mph) were anticipated within 48 hours. Ahead of the storm, upwards of 254 mm (10.0 in) fell across the islands, which were indirectly related to the storm. In southern Japan, several airlines canceled flights due to poor weather conditions.

Heavy rains, peaking at 345 mm (13.6 in) on Tarama, triggered flooding and landslides throughout the islands. The highest sustained winds on the islands were also recorded on Tarama at 137 km/h (85 mph) and the highest gust was recorded on Miyako-jima at 185 km/h (115 mph). Despite transitioning into an extratropical cyclone while impacting Japan, Conson brought heavy rains and high winds to Kyūshū. The highest rainfall and gusts were recorded in Tanegashima at 277.5 mm (10.93 in) and 146 km/h (91 mph) respectively; the highest sustained wind was recorded in Muroto, Kōchi at 109 km/h (68 mph).

On Ishigaki Island, high winds and heavy rains cut power to many residences and damaged crops. A total of 1,960 ha (4,800 acres) of agricultural land was damaged by the storm, leaving 319 million yen (US$2.92 million) in losses. Significant agricultural damage was also sustained on Miyako-jima, leaving 765 million yen (US$7 million) in losses. Okinawa sustained moderate damage during the passage of Conson, with several homes flooded and large lengths of power lines were lost. At the height of the storm, roughly 3,300 residences were without power and 1,305 power lines were downed. Additionally, 1,685 ha (4,160 acres) of agricultural land was damaged, leaving 324 million yen (US$2.96 million) in losses.

In Kagoshima Prefecture, Conson damaged 1,846 ha (4,560 acres) of agricultural land and flooded six homes. Agricultural damage in the prefecture amounted to 105 million yen (US$960,000). A large landslide, roughly 30 m (98 ft) wide, in Matsuyama, Ehime prompted the evacuation of 19 homes; however, no known damage resulted from the incident. Throughout Kōchi Prefecture, several highways were shut down after being damaged by Conson. Over 20 schools were let out early due to the deteriorating conditions. Damage on forestry reached 118 million yen (US$1.08 million).

== See also ==
- Other tropical cyclones named Conson
- Other tropical cyclones named Frank
- Tropical Storm Halong (2008)
- Typhoon Chan-hom (2009)
