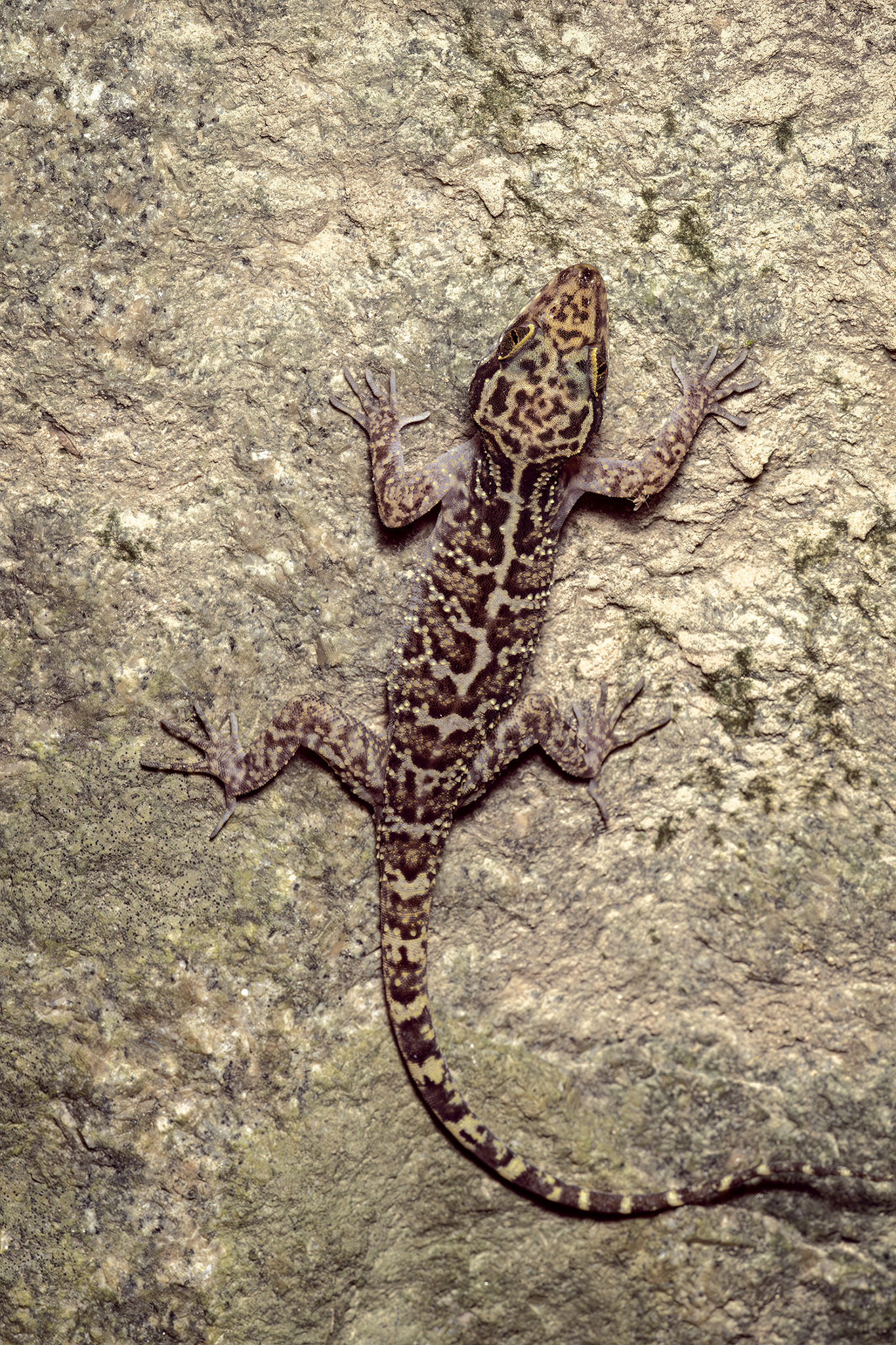

Scientific classification
- Kingdom: Animalia
- Phylum: Chordata
- Class: Reptilia
- Order: Squamata
- Suborder: Gekkota
- Family: Gekkonidae
- Genus: Cyrtodactylus
- Species: C. condorensis

Binomial name
- Cyrtodactylus condorensis (M.A. Smith, 1921)

Synonyms
- Gymnodactylus condorensis M.A. Smith, 1921; Cyrtodactylus condorensis — Underwood, 1954

= Cyrtodactylus condorensis =

Species of lizard

Cyrtodactylus condorensis is a species of gecko, a lizard in the family Gekkonidae. The species is endemic to Côn Sơn Island in Vietnam.

== Etymology ==
The specific name, condorensis, refers to the island's former English name, Pulo Condore.

== Description ==
Cyrtodactylus condorensis may attain a snout-to-vent length (SVL) of 8 cm (3.1 in), plus a tail 10 cm (3.9 in) long. Dorsally, it is grayish-brown, with large dark spots on the body, and dark crossbars on the tail. Ventrally it is light brownish. On the head, there is a dark streak through each eye, the streaks joining on the nape. The male has enlarged femoral scales and 4-7 preanal pores.

== Reproduction ==
Cyrtodactylus condorensis is oviparous.
