= Station Lampang =

Former U.S. Coast Guard base in Lampang, Thailand

Station Lampang was a United States Coast Guard LORAN facility located in Lampang, Thailand and operated from October 13, 1966 to April 29, 1975. Site preparation work began in April 1966 and most materials were on site by June. By the end of July, the station was staffed by the operating crew and first went on the air 8 August 1966. Station Lampang was designated Slave I, with the Master at Sattahip, Thailand, Slave II at Con Son Island Vietnam and the Monitor located at Udorn, Thailand. LORAN Station Tan My, Vietnam was added to the chain in August 1969. The transmitting towers at all locations were 625 feet tall.

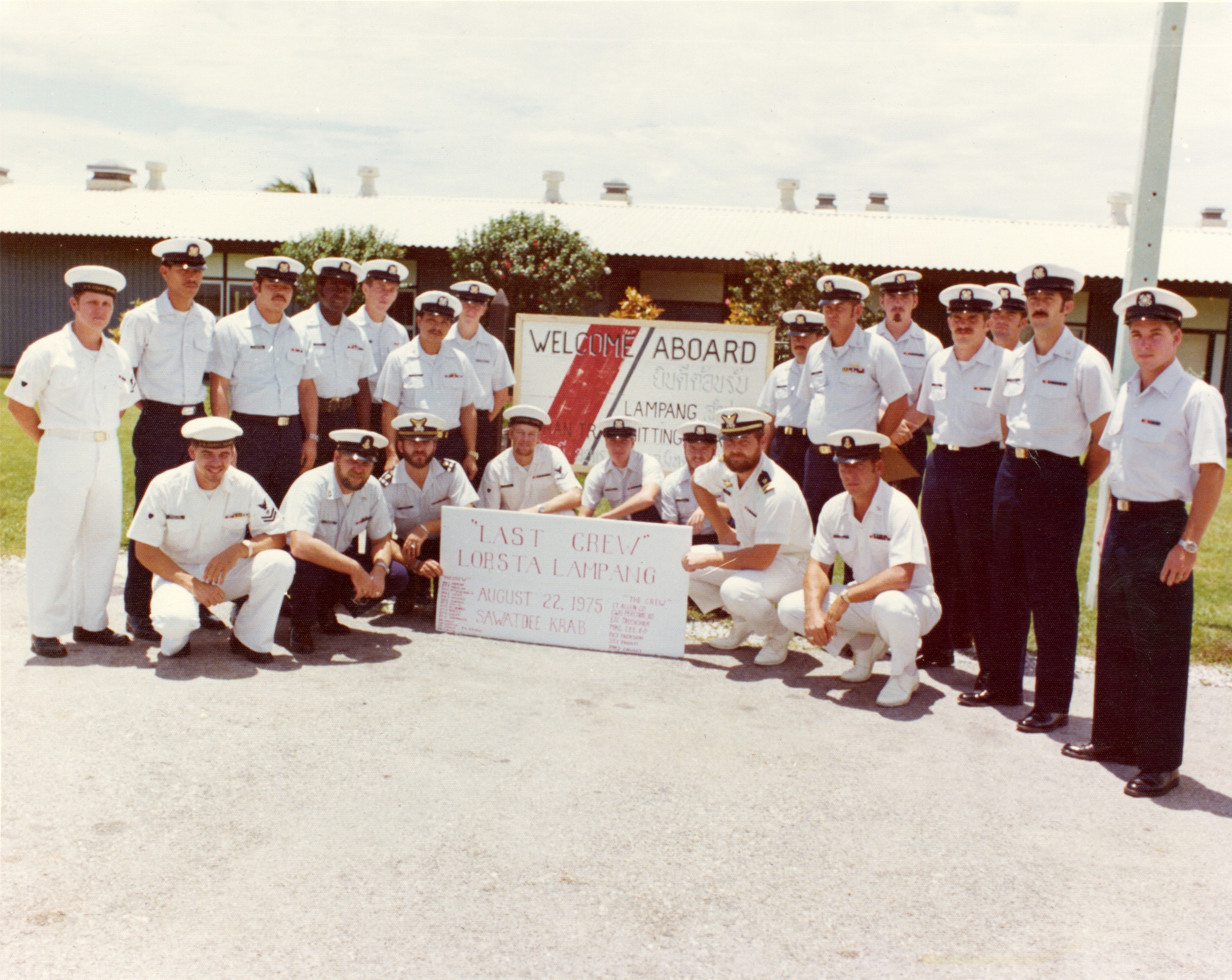
Admiral Thad Allen, then a lieutenant, poses with his crew on 22 August 1975 (front row, second from the right). Allen was the last commanding officer of LORAN Station Lampang, Thailand. Station Lampang was part of the LORAN chain first put into use as part of “Operation Tight Reign” in support of military operations in Vietnam.
