= List of storms named Conson =

The name Conson (Vietnamese: Côn Sơn, [kon˧˧ səːn˧˧]) was used for four tropical cyclones in the West Pacific Ocean. The name, contributed by Vietnam, refers to Côn Sơn Island in southern Vietnam.

- Typhoon Conson (2004) (T0404, 07W, Frank) – struck Japan.
- Typhoon Conson (2010) (T1002, 03W, Basyang) – struck the Philippines and Vietnam.
- Tropical Storm Conson (2016) (T1606, 08W) – remained out of sea.
- Severe Tropical Storm Conson (2021) (T2113, 18W, Jolina) – rapidly intensified before making landfall in the Philippines and later Vietnam.

The name Conson was retired after the 2021 season and replaced with Luc-Binh (Vietnamese: lục bình, [lʊwk͡p̚˨˩˨ ʔɓɨn˨˩]), which means Pontederia crassipes in Vietnamese.
