= Đất Đỏ =

Đất Đỏ Xã Đất Đỏ
- Commune
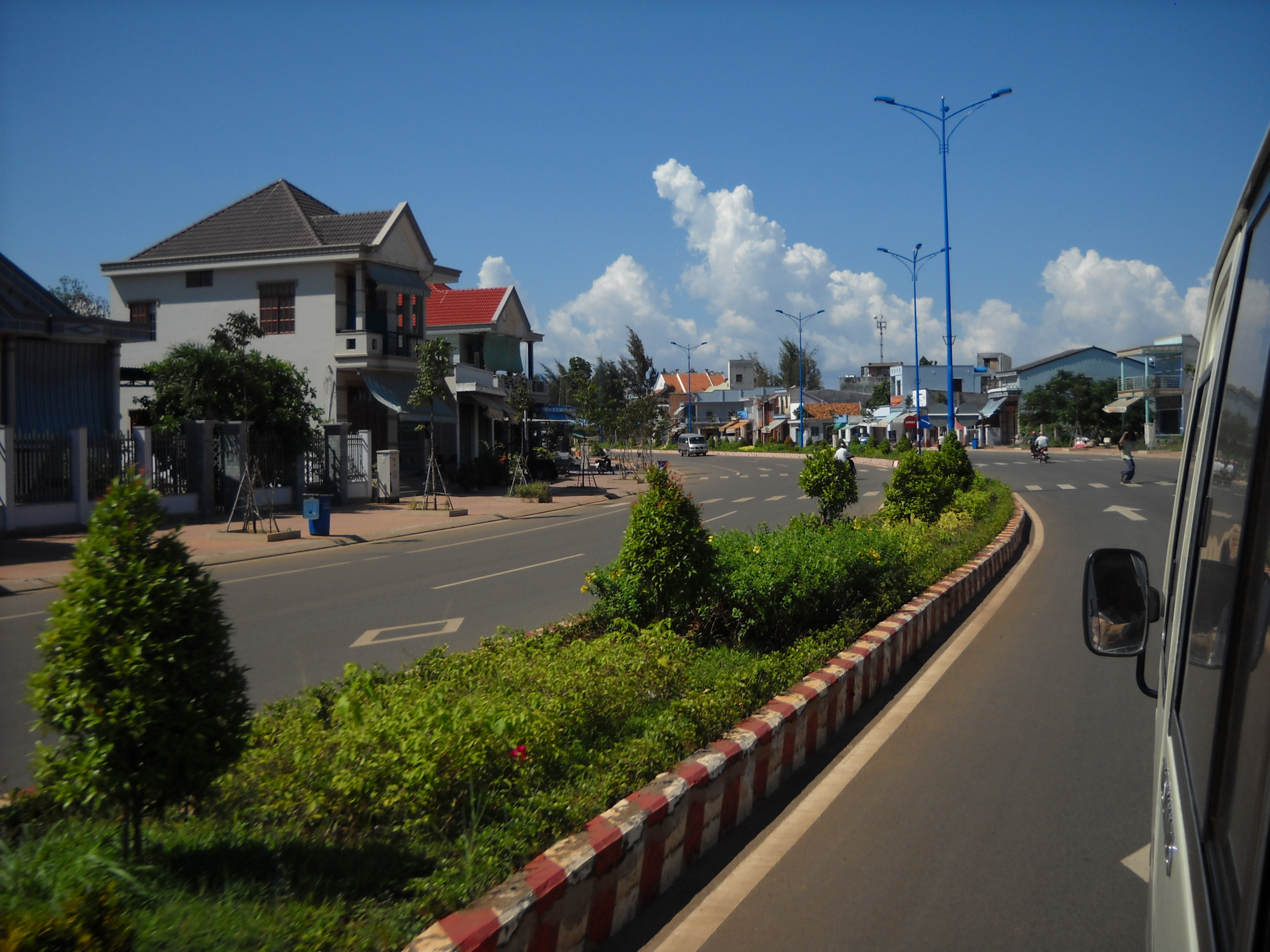
- A road in Đất Đỏ
- Interactive map of Đất Đỏ
- Coordinates: 10°30′22″N 107°15′53″E
- Country: Vietnam
- Municipality: Ho Chi Minh City
- Established: June 16, 2025

Area
  - Total: 46.24 sq mi (119.77 km^{2})

Population (2024)
  - Total: 43,862
  - Density: 948.50/sq mi (366.22/km^{2})
- Time zone: UTC+07:00 (Indochina Time)
- Administrative code: 26680

Đất Đỏ (Vietnamese: Xã Đất Đỏ) is a commune of Ho Chi Minh City, Vietnam. It is one of the 168 new wards, communes and special zones of the city following the reorganization in 2025.

== History ==
On June 16, 2025, the National Assembly Standing Committee issued Resolution No. 1685/NQ-UBTVQH15 on the arrangement of commune-level administrative units of Ho Chi Minh City in 2025 (effective from June 16, 2025). Accordingly, the entire land area and population of Đất Đỏ township and Long Tân, Phước Long Thọ, Láng Dài communes of the former Long Đất district will be integrated into a new commune named Đất Đỏ (Clause 152, Article 1).

== Notable people ==
Some notable figures who originated from or contributed to Dat Do commune:

- Huỳnh Tịnh Của (1834 – 1907) was a Vietnamese Confucian scholar who studied and translated European works, classical Chinese works and Nôm works into Quốc Ngữ - modern romanized Vietnamese.
- Võ Thị Sáu (1933 – 1952) was a teenager who fought as a guerrilla during the First Indochina War participating in the resistance movement against the French colonists for Vietnam’s independence.
- Nguyễn Thành Long (born in 1960) is a Vietnamese politician. He was formerly the Vice Chairman of the People's Committee of Ba Ria - Vung Tau province for the term 2016-2021. He also served as Acting Chairman of the People's Committee of Ba Ria - Vung Tau province from August to December 2019.
- Trần Minh Sanh (1956 – 2019) was a Vietnamese politician. He was formerly the Deputy Secretary of the Provincial Party Committee and Chairman of the People's Committee of Ba Ria - Vung Tau province.
