= Côn Đảo Prison =

Prison on Côn Sơn Island, Vietnam

Côn Đảo Prison in 2014

Location of Côn Đảo Island

Côn Đảo Prison (Vietnamese: Nhà tù Côn Đảo), also Côn Sơn Prison, is a prison on Côn Sơn Island (also known as Côn Lôn), the largest island of the Côn Đảo archipelago in southern Vietnam. Administratively it is located in Ho Chi Minh City. The prison was built in 1861 by the French colonists to jail those considered especially dangerous to the colonial government. Many of the high-ranking leaders of Vietnam's government were detained here. It is ranked a special historical relic of national importance by the government of Vietnam. The most famous site in this prison are the "tiger cages" (chuồng cọp). The French tiger cages cover an area of 5.475 m^{2}, within which each cell occupies 1.408 m^{2}, solariums occupy 1.873 m^{2}, and other spaces occupy 2.194 m^{2}. The prison includes 120 cells. The prison was closed after the end of the Vietnam War and opened for visitors soon after.

== History ==
=== French era ===
In 1861, the French colonial government established a prison on the island to house prisoners who had committed especially severe crimes. After the turn of the century, the prison held an increasingly larger population of political prisoners. In 1954, it was turned over to the South Vietnamese government, who continued to use it for the same purpose. Notable prisoners held at Côn Sơn included Huỳnh Thúc Kháng from 1908–1921, Phan Châu Trinh from 1908–1911, Tôn Đức Thắng, Phạm Văn Đồng and Lê Đức Thọ in the 1930s, and Nguyễn An Ninh who died in the prison on 14 August 1943, possibly killed by his jailers for fear that he might be used politically by the Japanese.

Võ Thị Sáu was executed at the prison in 1952 (though she was imprisoned at the police post outside of the prison). Not far from the prison is Hàng Dương Cemetery, where some of the prisoners who died between 1941 and 1975 were buried.

=== Vietnam War ===
During the Vietnam War, the prison was used to hold political prisoners and prisoners of war. In July 1970, two U.S. Congressional representatives, Augustus Hawkins and William Anderson, visited the prison. They were accompanied by Tom Harkin (then an aide), translator Don Luce, and USAID Office of Public Safety Director Frank Walton. When the delegation arrived at the prison, they departed from the planned tour, guided by a map drawn by a former detainee. The map led to the door of a building, which was opened from the inside by a guard when he heard the people outside the door talking. Inside they found prisoners were being shackled within cramped "tiger cages". Prisoners began crying out for water when the delegation walked in. They had sores and bruises, and some were mutilated. Harkin took photos of the scene. The photos were published in Life magazine on 17 July 1970.

== Tiger cage ==
Tiger cage (Vietnamese: Chuồng cọp) is the name of the prison constructed by the French. The Republic of Vietnam took control of the cage in order to detain Viet Minh political prisoners, the Liberation Army of South Vietnam and people who fought against France and America during the war era.

=== French-made tiger cage ===
- Construction year: 1940
- Total area: 5.475 m^{2}
- Each cell's area: 1.408 m^{2}
- "Sunbathe" cell's area: 1.873 m^{2}
- Empty space: 2.194 m²
- This cage consists of: 120 solitary confinement rooms (divided into 2 regions, each region has 60 cells)
- Basic characteristic: The top of each cell installed an iron grid and has a border between two regions which is a road for wardens.
- Besides, 60 cells have no ceiling, and are called "sunbathe" cells which are used to torture prisoners by making them "sunbathe" themselves.

== Notes ==
Citations

References used

- Kelley, Michael P. (2002). Where We Were in Vietnam. Hellgate Press, Central Point, Oregon. ISBN 978-1-55571-625-7.
