= USCGC Nettle =

History

United States
- Namesake: A plant of the genus Urtica
- Builder: Ingalls Shipbuilding Corp., Decatur, Alabama
- Cost: $805,494
- Yard number: 606
- Laid down: 1944, at Decatur, Alabama
- Completed: as U.S. Army Transport FS-396, 18 January 1945 (Coast Guard manned)
- Commissioned: as U.S. Army FS-396, 18 January 1945 (Coast Guard manned)
- Recommissioned: as USCGC Nettle (WAK-169), 1 October 1947
- Decommissioned: 9 January 1968
- Nickname(s): "Noodle", "Grey Ghost"
- Fate: transferred to Philippine Coast Guard, 9 January 1968 as BRP Limasawa (AE-79)

General characteristics
- Type: Army 381 design
- Displacement: 540 tonnes (530 long tons; 600 short tons) light; 935 tonnes (920 long tons; 1,031 short tons) full load
- Length: 176 ft (54 m)
- Beam: 32 ft (9.8 m)
- Draft: 10 ft (3.0 m)
- Propulsion: two 500hp General Motors 6-278A diesel engines, twin screws
- Speed: 14 knots, 4000 mile range
- Complement: 4 officers, 26 enlisted (1945)
- Sensors & processing systems: SO-8 (1955), SC (1966)
- Armament: 1 x 40 mm/60 gun (1945)

USCGC Nettle (WAK-169) was a United States Coast Guard Design 381 coastal freighter acquired from the United States Army and was designated as USA FS-396 during World War II army operations. She was transferred to the United States Coast Guard in 1947, and used for servicing aids to navigation and providing logistics support for U.S. Coast Guard manned LORAN stations in the Pacific Ocean.

== History ==
=== U.S. Army cargo service ===
FS-396 was constructed by Ingalls Shipbuilding Corp. at their shipyards at Decatur, Alabama for the U.S. Army Transportation Corps and commissioned 18 January 1945. She was manned by the U.S. Coast Guard for a period of one year and was used as a cargo ship to carry supplies to Kwajalein Atoll until being decommissioned on 18 January 1946.

=== U.S. Coast Guard service ===
USCGC Nettle Log Book September 1966

FS-396 was transferred to the U.S. Coast Guard and on 1 October 1947 was recommissioned as USCGC Nettle (WAK-169) after being refitted for use as an aids to navigation tender. From 1947 to 1952, Nettle hauled supplies and equipment to Kwajalein in the Marshall Islands. Nettle was home-ported at Guam in 1952 and provided logistical support for LORAN stations at Ulithi, Saipan, Cocos, Kwajelein, and Kwadak Island as well as servicing aids to navigation at Tinian and Rota in the Mariana Islands.

The home port for Nettle was changed to Naval Station Sangley Point, Cavite, Philippines in August 1953 and she provided logistical support for LORAN stations at Bataan, Batanes, Naulo Point, Zambales, Talumpulan, Busuanga, Tarumpitao Point, Palawan, and Panay.

While underway from Bataan on 1 September 1958, Nettle spotted and assisted the capsized junk Low Kow Wong How and rescued two of the crew. She was able to right the junk with her deck crane and pump it out, then continued her mission to deliver supplies to Naulo Point. During another search and rescue case on 2 August 1962, she searched the waters in the vicinity of Caballo Island for 29 hours looking for the missing crew of a downed U.S. Navy P5M seaplane with 13 persons aboard; there were no survivors found. During May 1966, Nettle delivered construction materials from Bangkok for a new LORAN station to be located at Con Son Island. Nettle was transferred to Philippine Coast Guard, 9 January 1968 as BRP Limasawa (AE-79).

== Notes ==
=== Sources ===
- Colton, Tim. "Ingalls Iron Works, Decatur AL". Shipbuilding History. ShipbuildingHistory.com.
- "Nettle, 1947 (WAK-169); ex FS-397" (PDF). Cutters, Craft & U.S. Coast Guard Manned Army & Navy Vessels. U.S. Coast Guard Historian's Office.
- "U.S.Coast Guard Cutter Nicknames" (PDF). U.S. Coast Guard Cutters & Craft Index. U.S. Coast Guard Historian's Office.
- Larzelere, Alex (1997). The Coast Guard at War, Vietnam, 1965-1975. Naval Institute Press, Annapolis. ISBN 978-1-55750-529-3.
- Scheina, Robert L. (1990). U.S. Coast Guard Cutters & Craft, 1946-1990. Naval Institute Press, Annapolis. ISBN 978-0-87021-719-7.
- Wertheim, Eric (2007). Naval Institute Guide to Combat Fleets of the World, 15th Edition. Naval Institute Press, Annapolis. ISBN 978-1-59114-955-2.
