= Hàng Dương Cemetery =

Cemetery in Vũng Tàu, Bà Rịa-Vũng Tàu, Vietnam

- Interactive map of Hàng Dương Cemetery

Details
- Location: Vũng Tàu, Bà Rịa-Vũng Tàu
- Country: Vietnam
- Coordinates: 8°41′40″N 106°36′50″E
- Type: memorial

Hàng Dương Cemetery is a memorial cemetery in Vietnam with the remains of independence fighters and prisoners who died at the Con Dao Prison. The cemetery is situated near the prison on Côn Sơn Island (also known as Côn Lôn) the largest island of the sixteen islands of the Con Dao archipelago. Many Vietnamese, war veterans, and former prisoners travel to the island to pay homage to the fallen at temple shrines and tombs. Many of the graves are unmarked but marked and numbered notable graves include those of Lê Hồng Phong, Nguyễn An Ninh and Võ Thị Sáu.
