= Long Điền district =

Coordinates: 10.4838°N 107.213°E

Long Điền district Huyện Long Điền
- District
- Seal

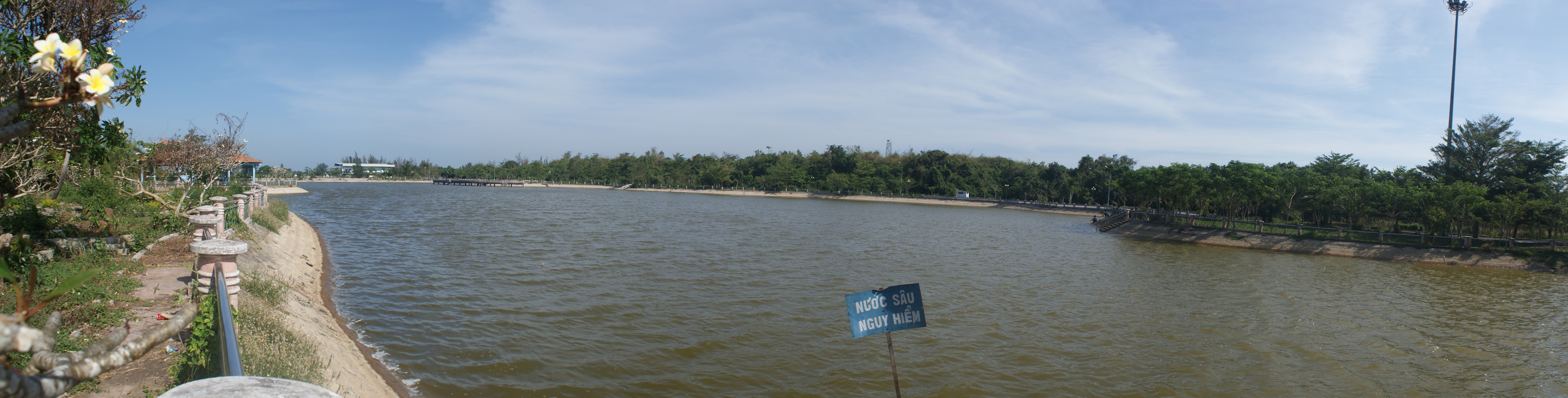
- Country: Vietnam
- Region: South East
- Province: Bà Rịa–Vũng Tàu
- Capital: Long Điền

Area
  - District: 30 sq mi (77 km^{2})

Population (2019 census)
  - District: 135,763
  - Density: 4,600/sq mi (1,800/km^{2})
  - Urban: 59,210
  - Rural: 76,553
- Time zone: UTC+7 (Indochina Time)

Long Điền is a former rural district of Bà Rịa–Vũng Tàu province in the Southeast region of Vietnam. As of 2019, the district had a population of 135,763. The district covers an area of 77 km^{2} (30 sq mi). The district capital lies at Long Điền.

== Administrative divisions ==
The district is divided administratively into 2 townships: Long Điền, the capital, and Long Hải, and 5 communes: An Ngãi, Tam Phước, An Nhất, Phước Hưng and Phước Tỉnh.
