= Long Đất district =

Coordinates: 10°28′40″N 107°18′27″E

Long Đất district Huyện Long Đất
- District
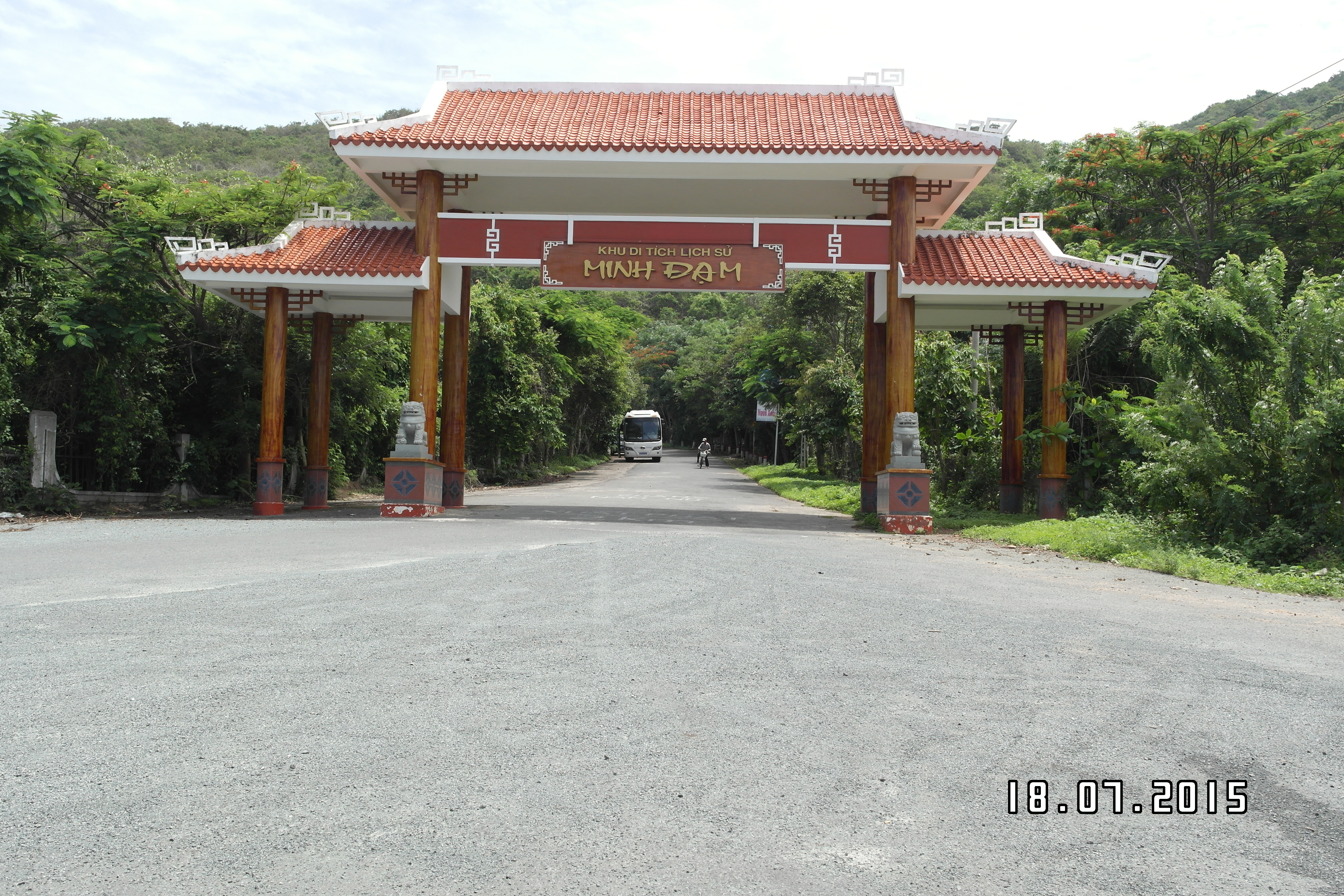
- Phước Hải village in Phước Hải township
- Country: Vietnam
- Region: Southeast
- Province: Bà Rịa–Vũng Tàu
- Capital: Đất Đỏ township

Area
  - Total: 103.25 sq mi (267.42 km^{2})

Population (2024)
  - Total: 241,501
  - Density: 2,339.0/sq mi (903.08/km^{2})
- Time zone: UTC+7 (Indochina Time)

Long Đất is a former rural district of Bà Rịa–Vũng Tàu province in the Southeast region of Vietnam.

== Administrative divisions ==
The district is divided administratively into 2 townships: Đất Đỏ, the capital, Long Điền, Long Hải and Phước Hải, and 7 communes: Tam An, Phước Hưng, Phước Tỉnh, Phước Long Thọ, Long Tân, Láng Dài and Phước Hội.
