= Huỳnh Tịnh Của =

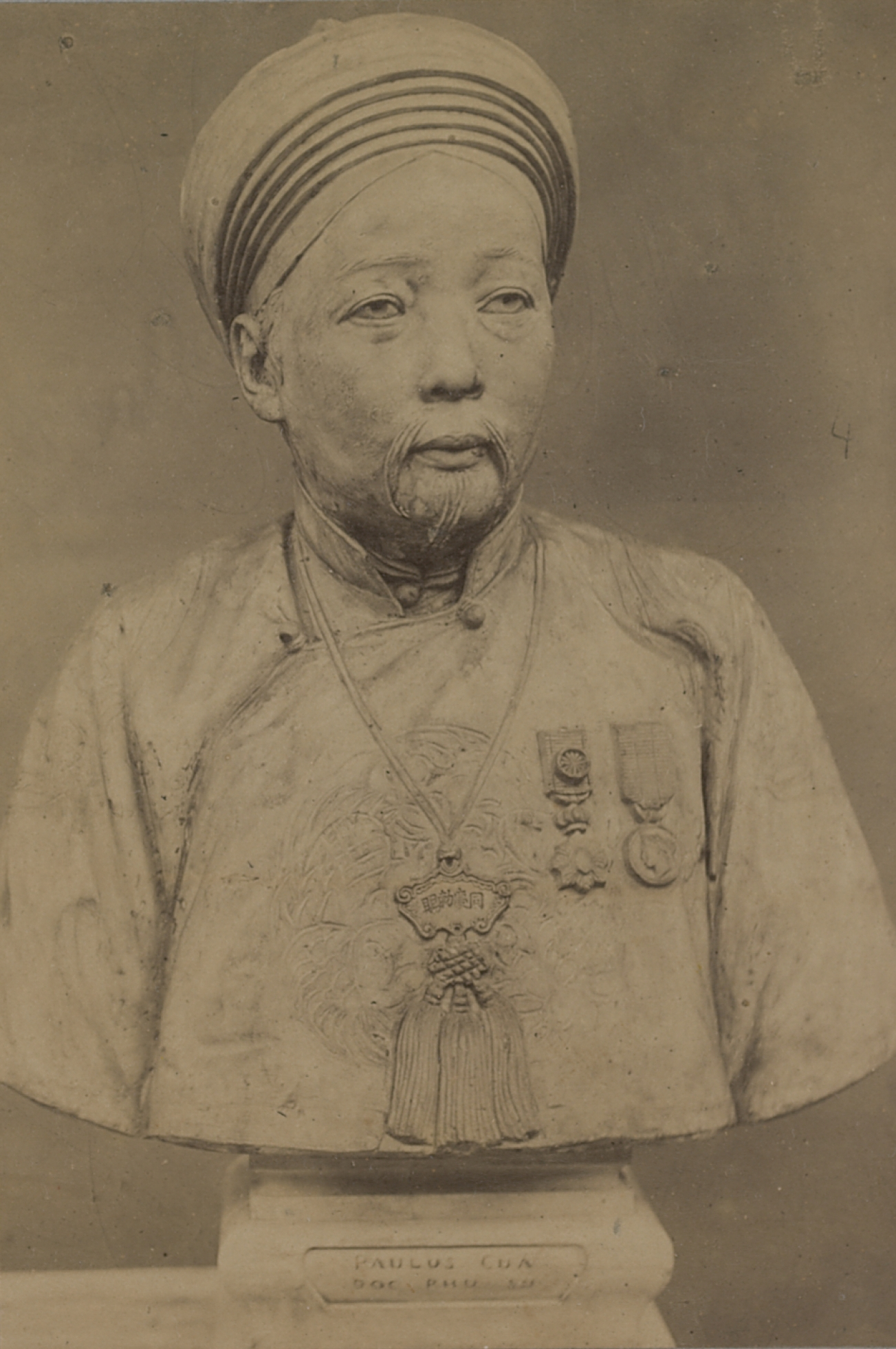
Sculpture of Paulus Của

Paulus Huỳnh Tịnh Của or Paulus Huình Tịnh Của (1834-1907) was a Vietnamese Confucian scholar who studied and translated European works, classical Chinese works and Nôm works into Quốc Ngữ - modern romanized Vietnamese. Like Trương Vĩnh Ký, Của was a Confucian scholar who converted to Catholicism. He worked for the French colonial government of Cochinchina in the translation of judicial papers.
