= Long Hải =

Long Hải Xã Long Hải
- Commune
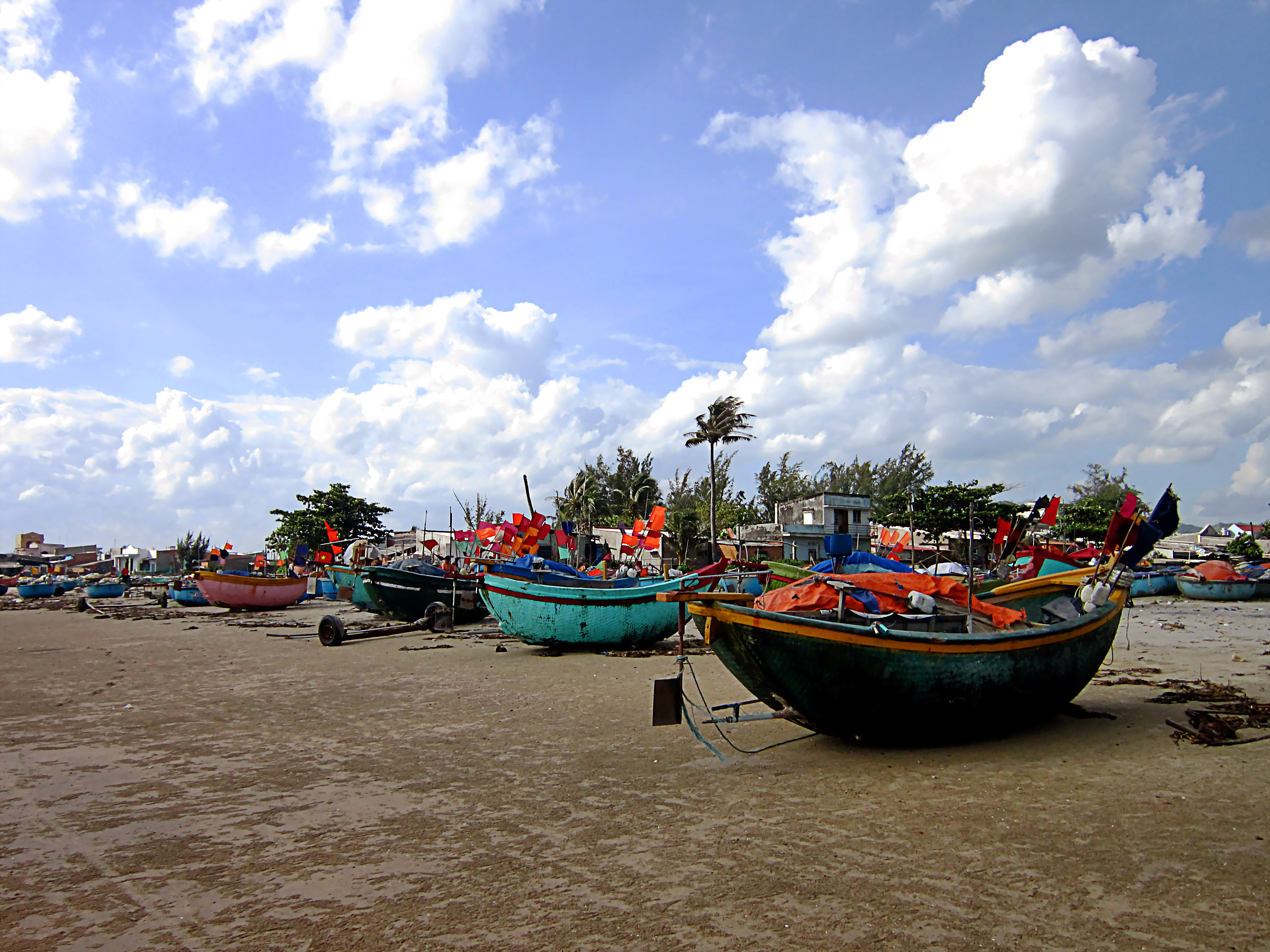
- A small fishing village in Long Hai
- Interactive map of Long Hải
- Coordinates: 10°23′58″N 107°14′10″E
- Country: Vietnam
- Municipality: Ho Chi Minh City
- Established: June 16, 2025

Area
  - Total: 10.78 sq mi (27.93 km^{2})

Population (2024)
  - Total: 109,149
  - Density: 10,120/sq mi (3,908/km^{2})
- Time zone: UTC+07:00 (Indochina Time)
- Administrative code: 26662

Long Hải (Vietnamese: Xã Long Hải) is a commune of Ho Chi Minh City, Vietnam. It is one of the 168 new wards, communes and special zones of the city following the reorganization in 2025.

== History ==
On June 16, 2025, the National Assembly Standing Committee issued Resolution No. 1685/NQ-UBTVQH15 on the arrangement of commune-level administrative units of Ho Chi Minh City in 2025 (effective from June 16, 2025). Accordingly, the entire land area and population of Long Hải township and Phước Tỉnh, Phước Hưng communes of the former Long Đất district will be integrated into a new commune named Long Hải (Clause 149, Article 1).

== Gallery ==
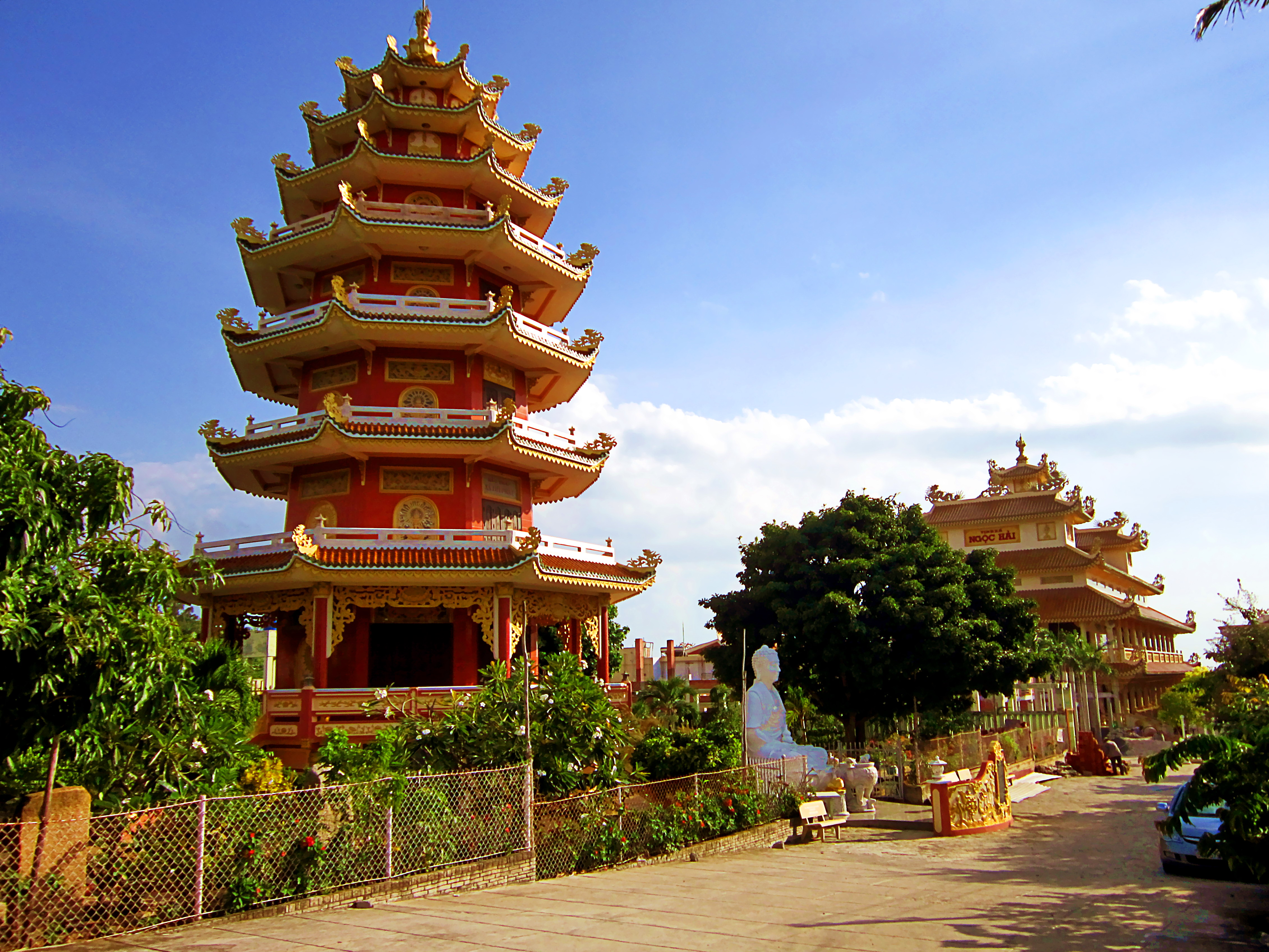
Long Hải Vihara on the beach in Long Hải

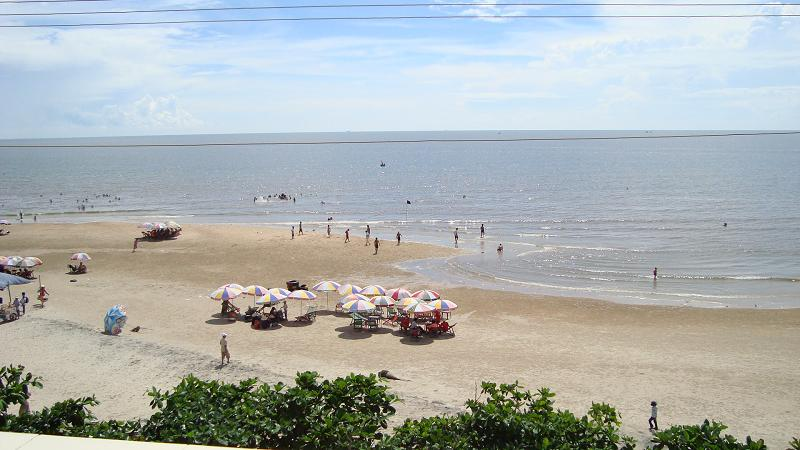
Long Hải Beach

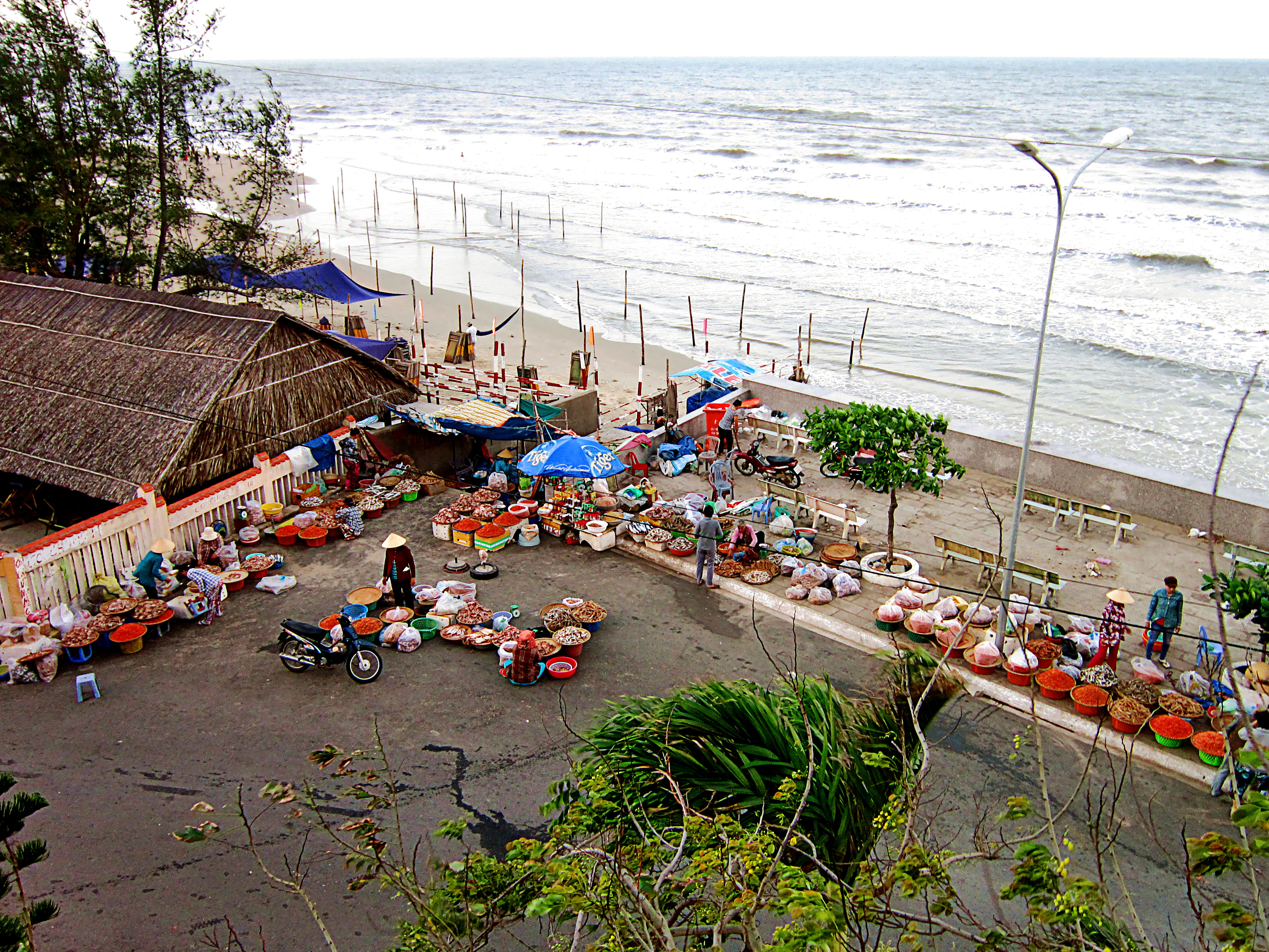
Dried seafood is sold quite a lot on the beach in Long Hải

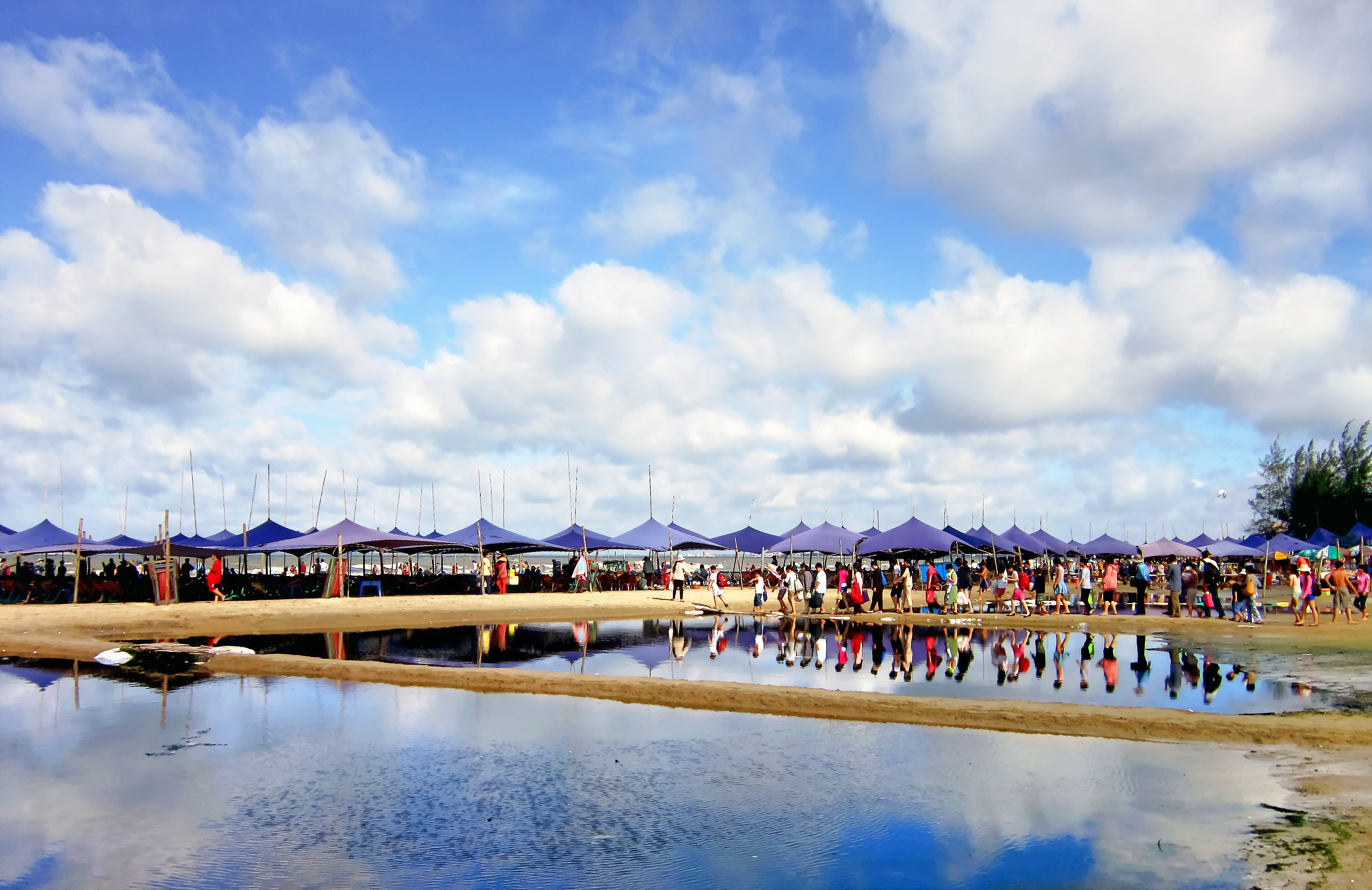
Busy scene on the beach in Long Hải
