= Long Điền, Ho Chi Minh City =

Long Điền Xã Long Điền
- Commune
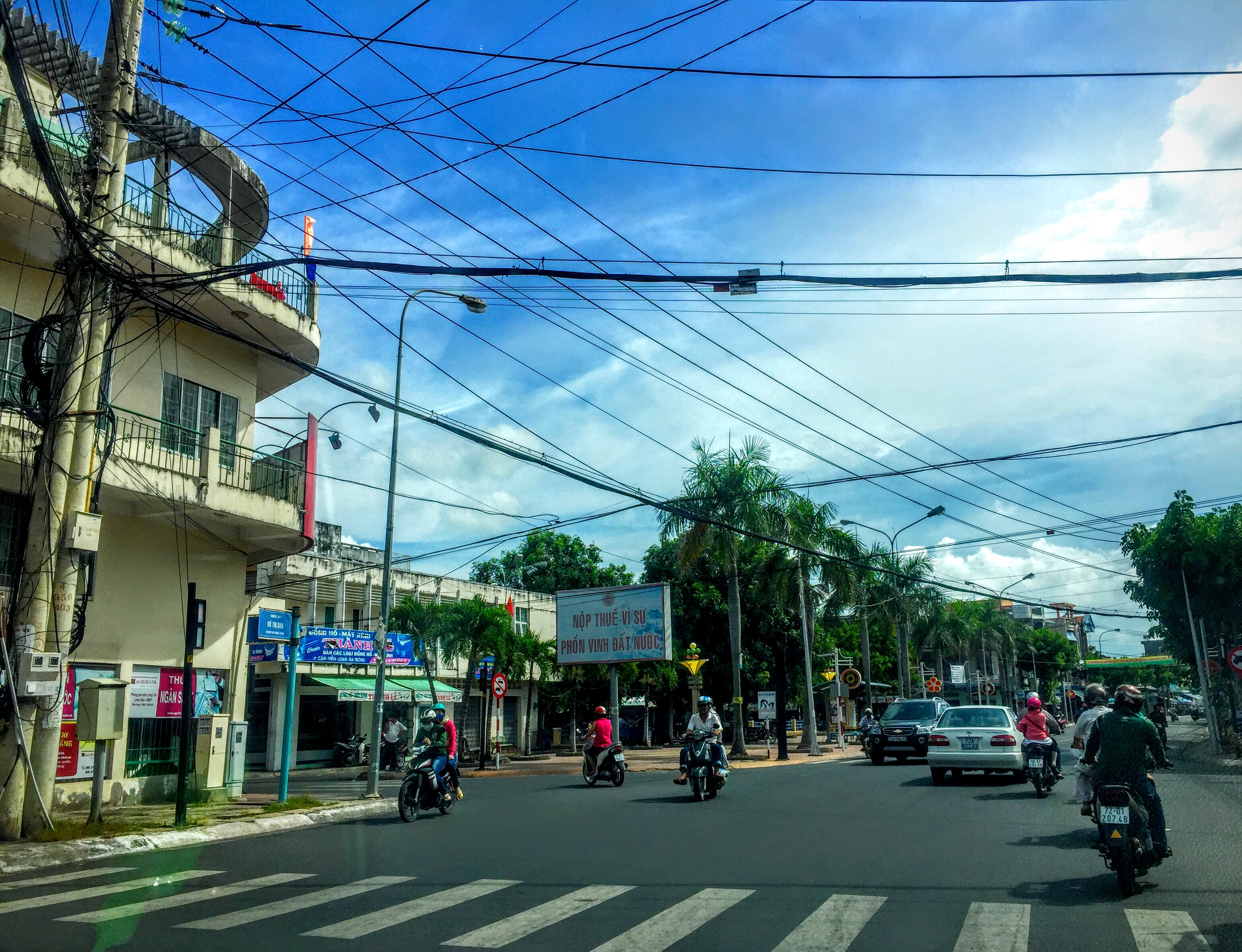
- A road in Long Điền
- Interactive map of Long Điền
- Coordinates: 10°29′01″N 107°12′46″E
- Country: Vietnam
- Municipality: Ho Chi Minh City
- Established: June 16, 2025

Area
  - Total: 19.86 sq mi (51.44 km^{2})

Population (2024)
  - Total: 48,048
  - Density: 2,419/sq mi (934.1/km^{2})
- Time zone: UTC+07:00 (Indochina Time)
- Administrative code: 26659

Long Điền (Vietnamese: Xã Long Điền) is a commune of Ho Chi Minh City, Vietnam. It is one of the 168 new wards, communes and special zones of the city following the reorganization in 2025.

== History ==
On June 16, 2025, the National Assembly Standing Committee issued Resolution No. 1685/NQ-UBTVQH15 on the arrangement of commune-level administrative units of Ho Chi Minh City in 2025 (effective from June 16, 2025). Accordingly, the entire land area and population of Long Điền township and Tam An commune of the former Long Đất district will be integrated into a new commune named Long Điền (Clause 150, Article 1).
