= Phước Hải =

Phước Hải Xã Phước Hải
- Commune
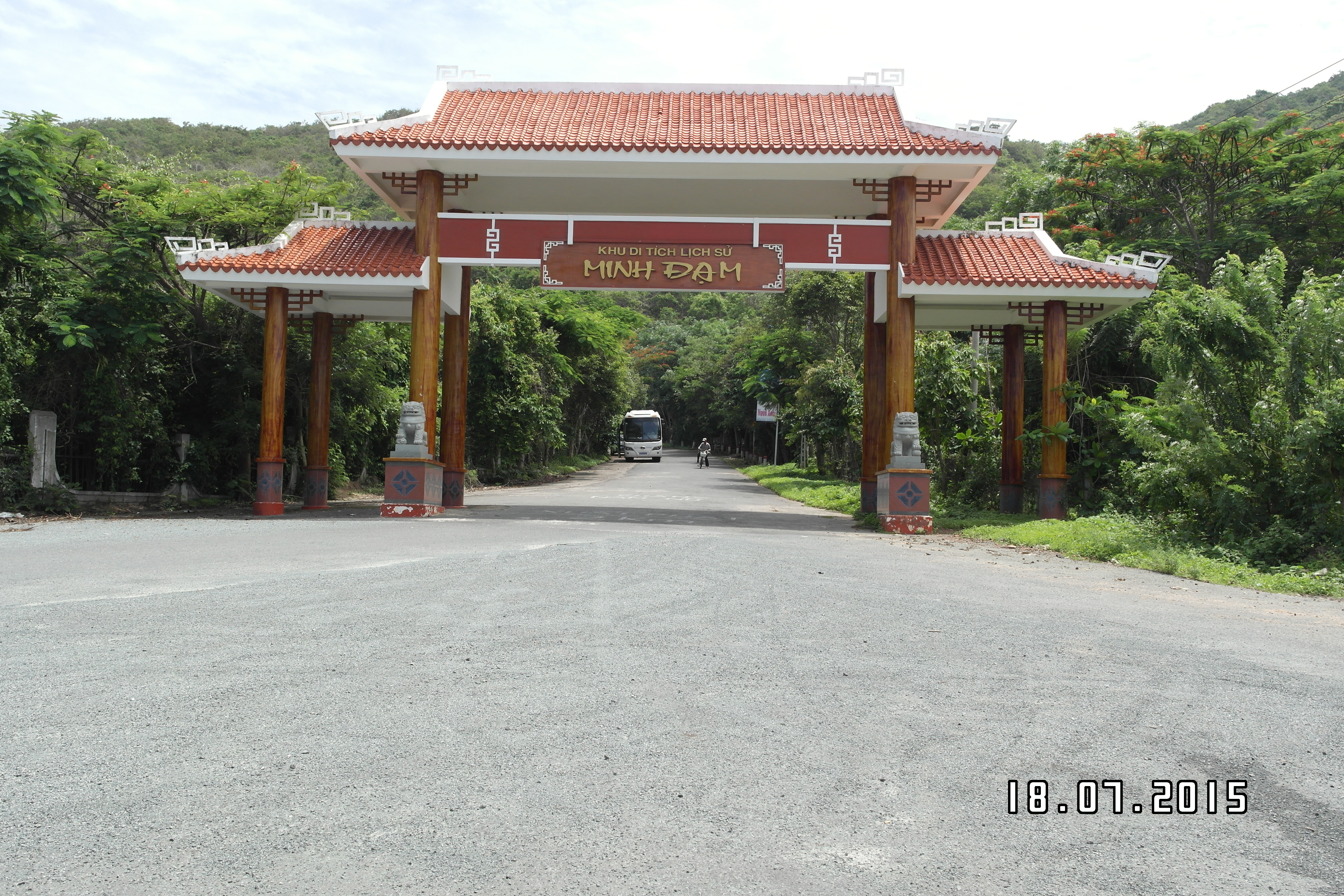
- Minh Dam Base Historic Site
- Interactive map of Phước Hải
- Coordinates: 10°25′42″N 107°17′43″E
- Country: Vietnam
- Municipality: Ho Chi Minh City
- Established: June 16, 2025

Area
  - Total: 27.04 sq mi (70.04 km^{2})

Population (2024)
  - Total: 43,615
  - Density: 1,613/sq mi (622.7/km^{2})
- Time zone: UTC+07:00 (Indochina Time)
- Administrative code: 26686

Phước Hải (Vietnamese: Xã Phước Hải) is a commune of Ho Chi Minh City, Vietnam. It is one of the 168 new wards, communes and special zones of the city following the reorganization in 2025.

== History ==
On June 16, 2025, the National Assembly Standing Committee issued Resolution No. 1685/NQ-UBTVQH15 on the arrangement of commune-level administrative units of Ho Chi Minh City in 2025 (effective from June 16, 2025). Accordingly, the entire land area and population of Phước Hải township and Phước Hội commune of the former Long Đất district will be integrated into a new commune named Phước Hải (Clause 151, Article 1).
