= Côn Sơn Island =

Island of Con Dao district, Vietnam

Coordinates: 8°41′35″N 106°36′34″E

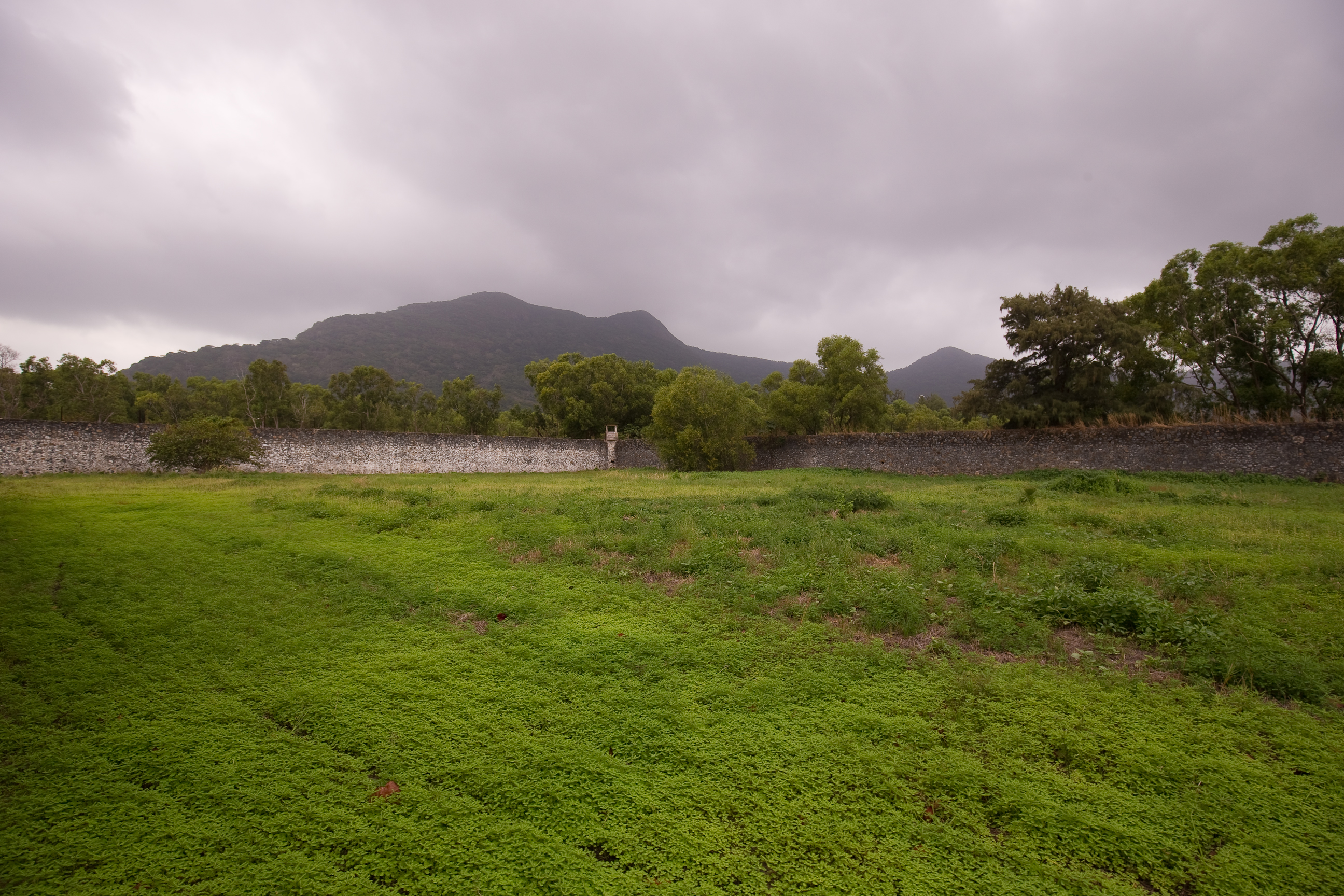
Côn Đảo Prison

Location of Côn Sơn Island

Côn Sơn ([kōn ʂɤ̄ŋ] cong-suhng), also known as Côn Lôn, is the largest island of the Côn Đảo archipelago, off the coast of southern Vietnam.

== Other names ==
Its former French name, Grande-Condore was popularly used during the times of French Indochina. Marco Polo mentioned the island in the description of his 1292 voyage from China to India under the name Sondur and Condur. In Ptolemy's Geography, they are referred to as the Isles of the Satyrs. The medieval Arabic/Persian name for Pulo Condor was Sundar Fulat (صندر فولات, Ṣundar Fūlāt).

== History ==
=== Chenla period ===
In c. 767, the Java (Daba) fleets from Shailendra dynasty were laid a military attacks. The Cambodian inscriptions were generally said the fleets was Malayan, Sumatran, Javanese, or all of them, quickly seized the island. At that time, the island was used by Javanese pirates to conducting numerous military raids on Champa and Chiaou-Chou.

=== English East India Company period ===
In 1702, the English East India Company founded a settlement on this island (the English called it 'Pulo Condore' after its Malay name, Pulau Kundur فولاو كوندور) off the south coast of southern Vietnam, and in 1705 the garrison and settlement were destroyed.

=== Tay Son period ===
In 1787, through the Treaty of Versailles, Nguyễn Ánh (the future Emperor Gia Long) promised to cede Poulo Condor to the French. In exchange Louis XVI promised to help Nguyễn Ánh to regain the throne, by supplying 1,650 troops (1,200 Kaffir troops, 200 artillery men and 250 black soldiers) on four frigates.

=== French colonial period ===
In 1861, the French colonial government established Côn Đảo Prison on the island to house political prisoners. In 1954, it was turned over to the South Vietnamese government, who continued to use it for the same purpose. Notable prisoners held at Côn Sơn in the 1930s included Phạm Văn Đồng, Nguyễn An Ninh and Lê Đức Thọ. Not far from the prison is Hàng Dương Cemetery, where some of the prisoners were buried.

=== Republic of Vietnam ===
==== Prison ====
During the Vietnam War the prison was used to hold political prisoners and captured Vietcong and People's Army of Vietnam soldiers.

The prison on Côn Sơn Island was closed in 1975 after the Fall of Saigon. The facilities were reopened with improved conditions some years later however, to temporarily incarcerate boat people captured by local coast guards until the late 1980s.

==== Loran-C Station Con Son ====
At the request of Secretary of Defense Robert McNamara, the U.S. Coast Guard started pre-construction plans for a chain of Loran-C radio stations to serve Southeast Asia 15 January 1966 in support of Operation Tight Reign during the Vietnam War. The actual construction of Station Con Son began during April with the delivery of construction materials by USCGC Nettle (WAK-169) and award of construction contracts to Morrison-Knudsen Corp. and Brown and Root Company. Station Con Son was one of five stations in the Southeast Asia chain and was designated SH-3 Yankee. It consisted of a 625 foot (191 m) tower, transmitter equipment buildings, fuel tanks, generators and barracks for personnel located on the north end of Con Son Island. The personnel complement for the station was two officers and 23 enlisted men. After commissioning on 2 September 1966 the station began the testing phase of operations and the five station chain was fully operational by 04:00 on 28 October, just nine months after the initial request from the Department of Defense. The station provided, along with its sister stations in the chain, signals that allowed aircraft and ships to receive accurate all-weather positioning data for navigation purposes. During January 1973 the operation of the station was turned over to civilian contractors who were responsible to the United States Coast Guard for all functions of the station. The Coast Guard continued to supply logistical and technical support on an as needed basis. When the fall of the South Vietnamese government was imminent, Station Con Son was directed to stay on the air until the last possible minute to provide navigation signals to aircraft and ships fleeing South Vietnam. Station Con Son stayed on the air until 1246 local time on 29 April 1975, after which the crew over-sped the generators and damaged critical pieces of electronic gear.

=== The Fall of Saigon ===
The U.S. had leased a number of ships to the Republic of Vietnam Navy (RVNN) and wished to limit the number of ships and technology that the Vietnam People's Navy would get their hands on should South Vietnam fall. North Vietnam's 1975 spring offensive was so successful, it soon became apparent Saigon would be overtaken. American military attaché Richard Armitage was sent to convince as many RVNN ship captains as possible to refuse to surrender their commands, escape en masse to a designated location to scuttle their ships, and get picked up by the U.S. Navy. Armitage and Captain Kiem Do, RVNN Deputy Chief of Staff, had an unspoken understanding that none of those captains or their crews would leave their families behind, and Armitage failed to report that detail to Washington.

The location they had decided to meet was Côn Sơn Island where Armitage, embarked aboard USS Kirk (FF-1087), found a flotilla of 35 RVNN ships, fishing trawlers, and some 50 other smaller vessels in various states of seaworthiness, all completely filled with some 30,000 evacuees. With no other way to transport so many people, Armitage and Kirk's captain, Paul Jacobs, decided to escort as many ships capable of making the voyage to U.S. Naval Base Subic Bay in the Philippines, over 1,000 miles (1,600 km) away. In all, 32 RVNN ships were saved and eventually transferred into Philippine Navy service, with LSM Lam Giang (HQ-402), fuel barge HQ-474, and gunboat Kéo Ngựa (HQ-604) scuttled off Côn Sơn when it was determined they would be unable to safely make the journey.

== Notes ==
=== References cited ===
- Chapuis, Oscar M. (1995). History of Vietnam:From Hong Bang to Tu Duc. Greenwood Press. ISBN 978-0-313-29622-2.
- Johnson, Robert Erwin (1987). Guardians of the Sea: History of the United States Coast Guard, 1915 to the Present. Naval Institute Press, Annapolis. ISBN 978-0-87021-720-3.
- Kamm, Henry (2002). Dragon Ascending. Arcade Books. ISBN 978-1-61145-078-1.
- Kelley, Michael P. (2002). Where We Were in Vietnam. Hellgate Press, Central Point, OR. ISBN 978-1-55571-625-7.
- Larzelere, Alex (1997). The Coast Guard at War, Vietnam, 1965–1975. Naval Institute Press, Annapolis. ISBN 978-1-55750-529-3.
- Perlstein, Rick (2010). Nixonland: The Rise of a President and the Fracturing of America. New York: Simon and Schuster. ISBN 978-1-4516-0626-3.
- Scotti, Paul C. (2000). Coast Guard Action in Vietnam:Stories of Those Who Served. Hellgate Press, Central Point, Oregon. ISBN 978-1-55571-528-1.
