= Hanoi–Lao Cai Expressway =

Road in Vietnam

CT.05 Expressway
- Hanoi–Lao Cai Expressway
- Đường cao tốc Hà Nội- Lào Cai
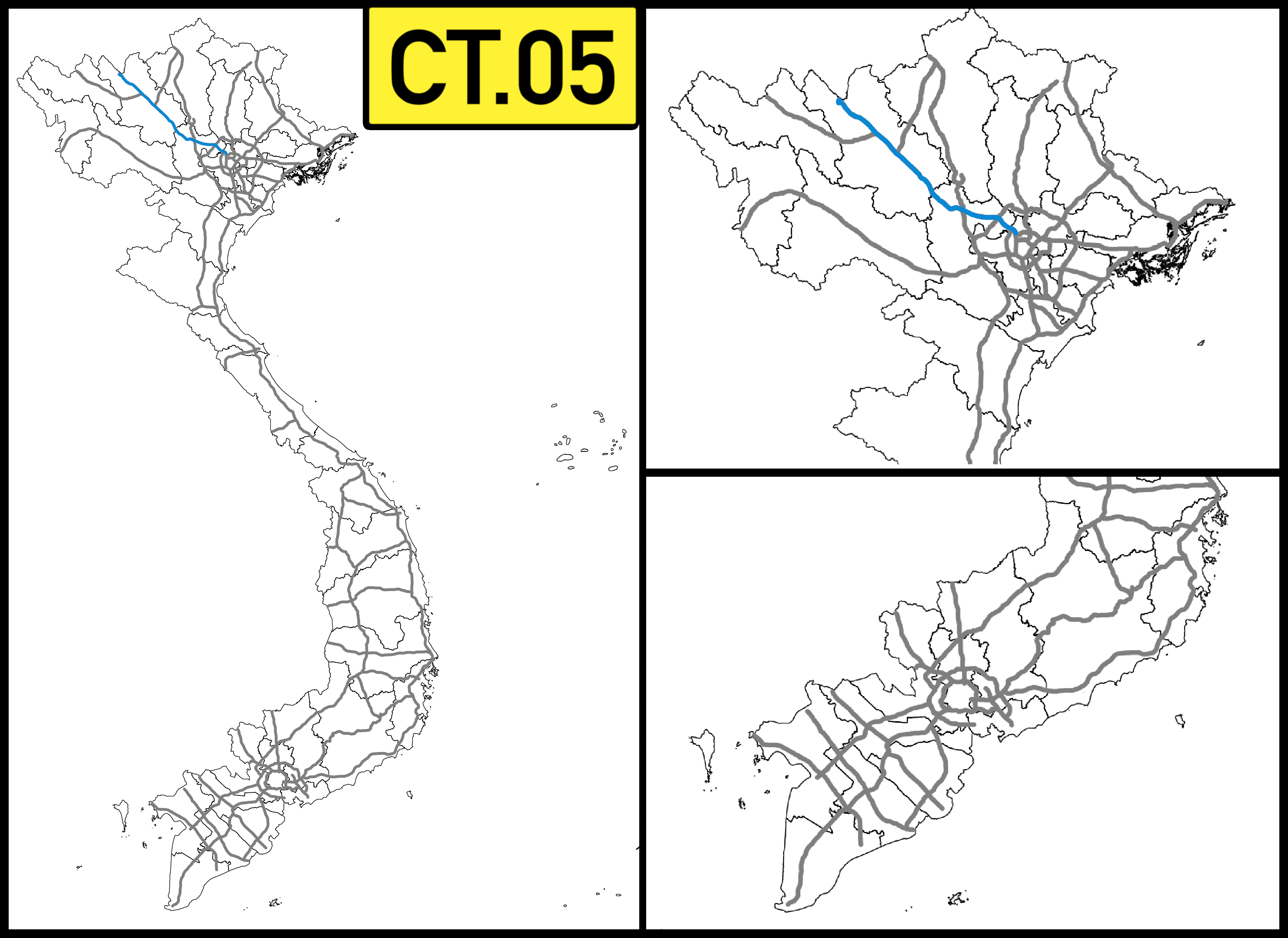

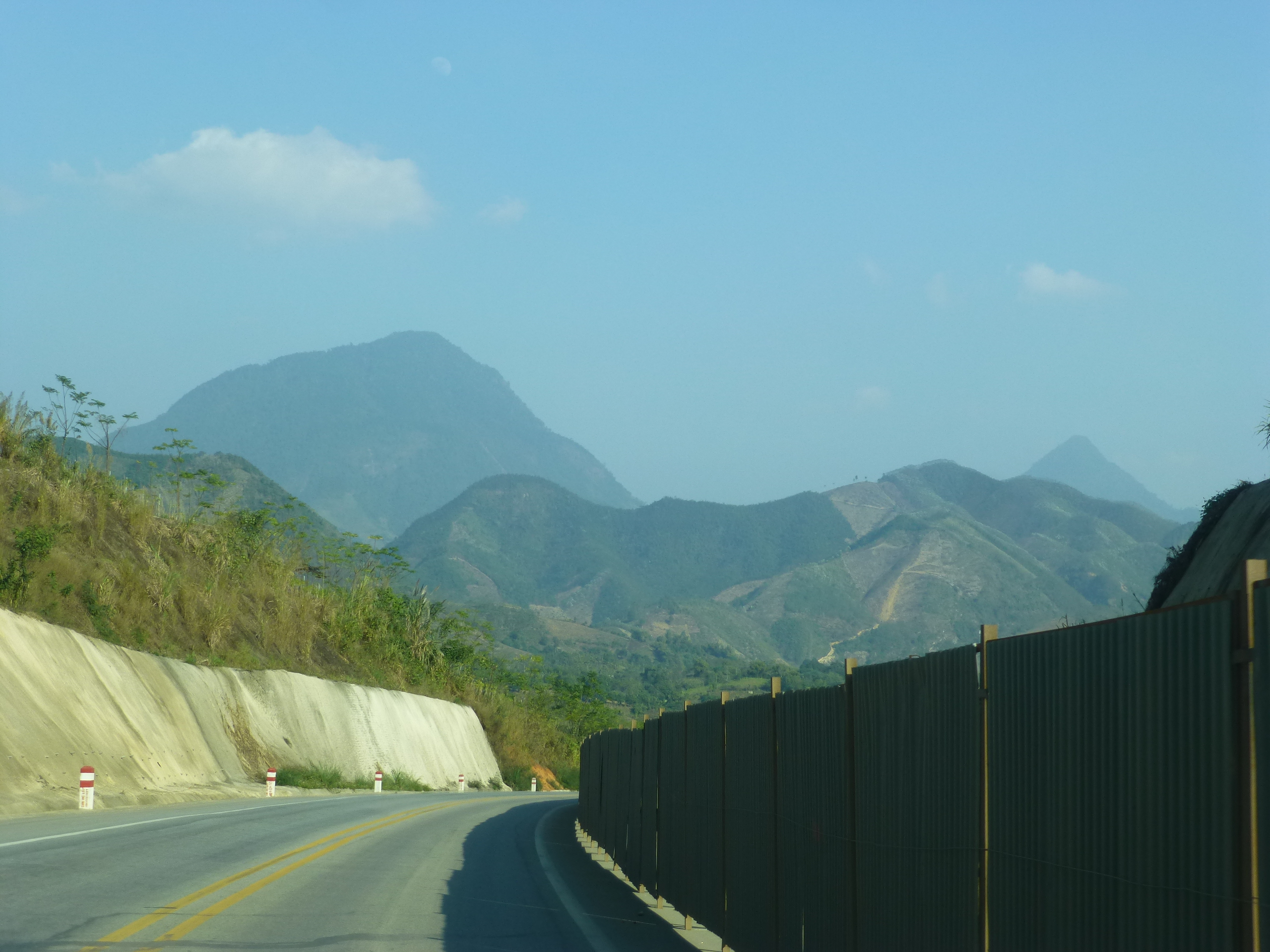

Route information
- Part of AH14
- Maintained by Vietnam Expressway Corp (VEC)
- Length: 264 km (164 mi)
- Existed: 21 September 2014–present

Major junctions
- East end: in Hanoi
- West end: at Lào Cai International Border Gate, Chinese border

Location
- Country: Vietnam
- Provinces: Hanoi, Vĩnh Phúc, Phú Thọ, Yên Bái, Lào Cai

Highway system
- Transport in Vietnam
← CT.04	→ CT.06

The Hanoi–Lao Cai Expressway, or the Noi Bai–Lao Cai Expressway (Vietnamese: Đường cao tốc Nội Bài - Lào Cai, labelled CT.05), is an expressway section of the Expressways of Vietnam, 265 km long and has its starting point at the intersection of National Highway 18 with National Highway 2 in Thanh Xuân commune, Sóc Sơn district, Hanoi and the end point at Duyên Hải ward, Lào Cai, Lào Cai province, connecting with G8011 Kaiyuan–Hekou Expressway at Lào Cai International Border Gate. This Expressway is part of the Asian Highway Network (AH14) and Transport infrastructure development project Kunming–Hanoi–Hai Phong economic corridor.

This route passes through 5 provinces and cities: Hanoi (12 km), Vĩnh Phúc (40 km), Phú Thọ (62 km), Yên Bái (65 km) and Lào Cai (83 km).

== Construction ==
Construction on the expressway began in 2009 with a total investment of US$1.46 billion. The Asian Development Bank provided a US$1 billion loan for development of the expressway. South Korean Posco Group won 3 of the 8 bids, China's Guangxi Road & Bridge Engineering won 2 bids and Vietnamese Vinacomex won one.

When it opened on 21 September 2014, it was the longest expressway in Vietnam. The Yên Bái to Lao Cai section of the route was opened as a two-lane expressway, the section between Yen Bai and Hanoi being a four-lane dual carriageway.

== Route details ==
=== Lanes ===
- Noi Bai–Yen Bai section: 160km long, with 4 lanes, 2 shoulder, maximum speed of 100km/h (from Km0+00 to Km123+080). There are 2 lanes in each direction, each lane is 3.75m wide and an emergency lane is 3m wide.
- Yen Bai–Lào Cai section: 83km long, with 2 lanes, 2 shoulder, maximum speed of 80km/h. There are 1 lanes in each direction, each lane is 3.5m wide and an emergency lane is 2.5m wide. Every 8–10 km, there is a 1km-long 4-lane section for vehicles to pass each other.

=== Length ===
Total route length: 264 km

=== Speed ===
- 2-lane section: Maximum: 80km/h, Minimum: 60km/h
- 4-lane section: Maximum: 100km/h, Minimum: 60km/h (section Lào Cai City - Lào Cai international border gate Maximum: 90km/h, Minimum: 60km/h)

According to design, the maximum speed is 120 km/h. VEC will allow vehicles to run at a maximum speed of 120 km/h when ensuring safe conditions along the entire route.

== List of interchanges and features ==
Speed Information

- IC - interchange, JCT - junction, SA - service area, PA - parking area, BS - bus stop, TN - tunnel, TB - toll gate, BR - bridge

No.	Name	Dist. from Origin	Connections	Notes	Location	
Connect with Noi Bai–Bac Ninh–Ha Long Expressway ( National Route 18)
1	Nội Bài JCT	0.0	Noi Bai–Bac Ninh–Ha Long Expressway; National Route 18; National Route 2 Võ Văn Kiệt road (to Hanoi Center); Nội Bài International Airport		Hà Nội	Sóc Sơn
2	Ring Road 4 IC	3.7	Ring Road 4 (Hanoi)	Planned	Hà Nội	Sóc Sơn
TG	Toll Gate Km6	6			Hà Nội	Sóc Sơn
3	IC.02	7.9	Nguyễn Tất Thành Road	Planned	Vĩnh Phúc	Phúc Yên
4	Bình Xuyên IC	14.0	Provincial Road 310		Vĩnh Phúc	Bình Xuyên
SA	Phước An SA				Vĩnh Phúc	Bình Xuyên
5	Tam Đảo IC	25.0	National Route 2B		Vĩnh Phúc	Tam Dương
6	IC.05	31.4	National Route 2C	Planned	Vĩnh Phúc	Tam Dương
BR	Phó Đáy Bridge	↓		Phó Đáy River crossing	Vĩnh Phúc	Boundary Tam Dương–Lập Thạch
7	Văn Quán IC	40.9	Provincial Road 305C		Vĩnh Phúc	Lập Thạch
BR	Sông Lô Bridge	↓		Lô River crossing	Boundary Vĩnh Phúc–Phú Thọ	
8	Việt Trì IC	49.4	Phù Đổng Road		Phú Thọ	Việt Trì
9	Phù Ninh IC	54.9	National Route 2		Phú Thọ	Phù Ninh
SA	Service Area Km57	57			Phú Thọ	Lâm Thao
10	Phú Thọ IC	66.3	Tuyên Quang–Phú Thọ and Phú Thọ–Chợ Bến; HCM Road		Phú Thọ	Phú Thọ
BR		↓		Hanoi–Lào Cai railway crossing	Phú Thọ	Thanh Ba
BR	Hồng River Bridge	↓		Hồng River crossing	Phú Thọ	Boundary Thanh Ba–Cẩm Khê
11	Sai Nga IC	81.5	National Route 32C		Phú Thọ	Cẩm Khê
12	Hạ Hòa IC	98.6	National Route 70B		Phú Thọ	Vô Tranh
13	Yên Bái JCT	114.8	Âu Cơ Road		Yên Bái	Trấn Yên
SA	Service Area Km117	117.5			Yên Bái	Trấn Yên
14	IC.13	121.4	National Route 37	Under construction	Yên Bái	Yên Bái
BR	Ngòi Rào Bridge	↓		Ngòi Rào crossing	Yên Bái	Trấn Yên
BR	Ngòi Thia Bridge	↓		Ngòi Thia crossing	Yên Bái	Văn Yên
15	Mậu A JCT	150.0	Provincial Road 166	Connect with Northern mountain belt	Yên Bái	Văn Yên
16	IC.15	166.3	Provincial Road 166	Planned	Yên Bái	Văn Yên
SA	Service Area Km171	171.5			Yên Bái	Văn Yên
TN	Noi Bai–Lào Cai Expressway Tunnel	↓		Completed the 500m long tunnel, phase 1	Yên Bái	Văn Yên
17	Văn Bàn JCT	199.9	National Route 279	Connect with Bảo Hà–Lai Châu	Lào Cai	Văn Bàn
BR	Nhù Bridge	↓		Nhù Stream crossing	Lào Cai	Boundary Bảo Yên–Bảo Thắng
18	Phố Lu JCT		National Route 4E		Lào Cai	Bảo Thắng
19	Xuân Giao IC	234.0	National Route 4E		Lào Cai	Bảo Thắng
TG	Toll Gate Km237	237		Toward Lào Cai	Lào Cai	Bảo Thắng
SA	Service Area Km237	237			Lào Cai	Bảo Thắng
TG	Toll Gate Km237	237		Toward Nội Bài	Lào Cai	Bảo Thắng
20	Cam Đường JCT	245.0	Bình Minh Road		Lào Cai	Lào Cai
TN	Tunnel	↓		Toward Lào Cai	Lào Cai	Lào Cai
21	National Route 4D JCT	256.0	National Route 4D		Lào Cai	Lào Cai
22	Kim Thành JCT	264.4	Khúc Thừa Dụ Road		Lào Cai	Lào Cai
Connect with Kaiyuan–Hekou Expressway through to Hekou - Lào Cai International Border
1.000 mi = 1.609 km; 1.000 km = 0.621 mi: Closed/former; Proposed; Incomplete access; Route transition; Unopened

== See also ==
- Hanoi–Lào Cai railway
