= Tuyen Quang–Phu Tho Expressway =

Road in Vietnam

CT.02 Expressway
- Tuyên Quang–Phú Thọ Expressway
- Đường cao tốc Tuyên Quang–Phú Thọ
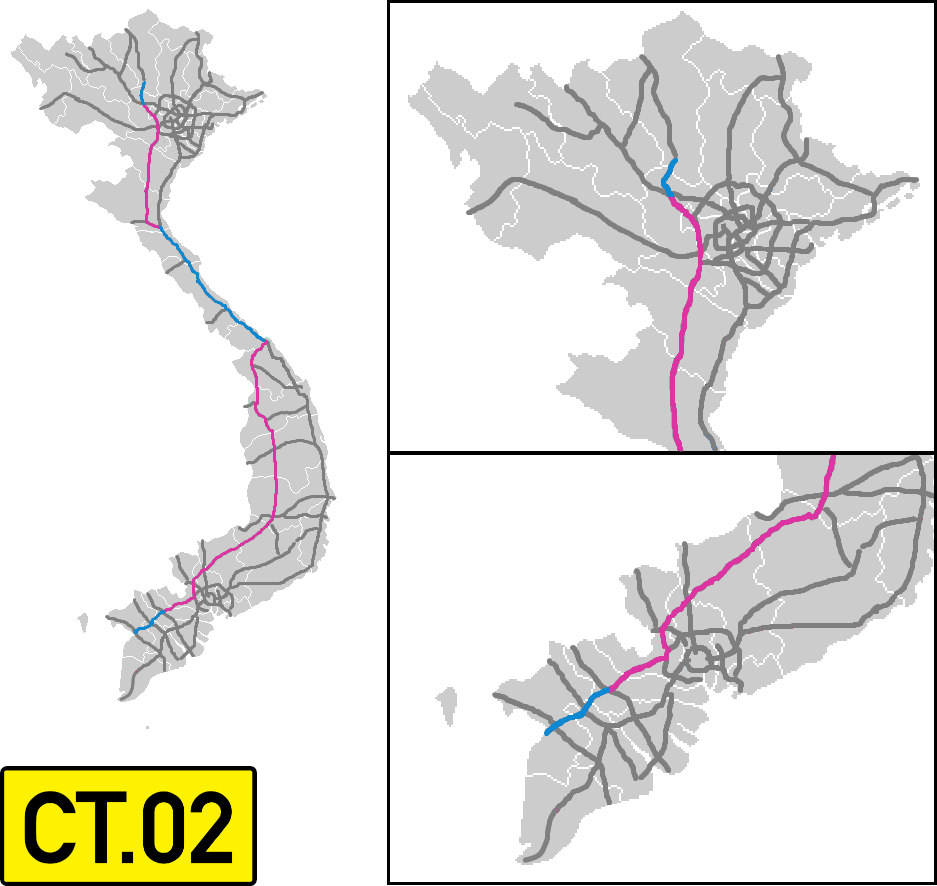

Route information
- Maintained by Vietnam Expressway Corp (VEC)
- Length: 40.2 km (25.0 mi)
- Existed: 24 December 2023–present

Major junctions
- North end: at Lưỡng Vượng, Tuyên Quang Province
- AH14 at Đoan Hùng, Phú Thọ
- South end: IC9 Hanoi–Lao Cai Expressway

Location
- Country: Vietnam
- Provinces: Tuyên Quang, Phú Thọ

Highway system
- Transport in Vietnam

The Tuyên Quang–Phú Thọ Expressway (Vietnamese: Đường cao tốc Tuyên Quang–Phú Thọ) (CT.02) is an expressway section of the North–South Expressway West system with a length of 40.2 kilometres (25.0 mi), of which about 29 kilometres (18 mi) goes through Phú Thọ province, with the rest belonging to Tuyên Quang province.

== Design ==
The starting point of the expressway begins at Luong Vuong commune, Tuyen Quang City; the end point is at intersection IC.9 on Hanoi–Lao Cai Expressway, in Phu Tho town. It has a total length of 40.2 km, including intersections of National Highway 2D, National Highway 70, Provincial Road 314B, National Highway 2, and Provincial Road 315. The completed phase will build two more emergency stopping lanes. In addition, each lane's width will increase to 3.75m, as opposed to 3.5m in phase 1. The completed phase will have a maximum speed of 120 km/h.

== Construction ==
Total project investment is 3,112.970 billion VND using central and local budget capital. Of which, the total investment in phase 1 is 2,653 billion VND, and phase 2 is 459.970 billion VND. Construction started on 23 February 2021 and was completed on 24 December 2023.

== Route details ==

The expressway has four lanes, with emergency stops. Its total route length is 40.2 km. The maximum speed is 90 km/h, and the minimum is 60 km/h.

== Detailed route ==
- IC - interchange, JCT - junction, SA - service area, PA - parking area, BS - bus stop, TN - tunnel, TB - toll gate, BR - bridge

No.	Name	Dist. from Origin	Connections	Notes	Location	
1	Lưỡng Vượng IC	0.0	QL.2	Start Expressway	Tuyên Quang	Tuyên Quang
2	Yên Sơn IC	8.9	QL.2D	Connect with Tuyen Quang – Ha Giang	Tuyên Quang	Yên Sơn
BR	Đoan Hùng Bridge	↓		Crossing Chay River	Phú Thọ	Đoan Hùng
3	Đoan Hùng IC	17.2	QL.70		Phú Thọ	Đoan Hùng
4	Provincial Road 312 IC	30.5	Provincial Road 312		Phú Thọ	Boundary Đoan Hùng–Thanh Ba
5	Provincial Road 315B	40.2	Provincial Road 315B		Phú Thọ	Phú Thọ
6	IC CT.05		Hanoi–Lao Cai Expressway	End Expressway	Phú Thọ	Phú Thọ
Connect directly to Phú Thọ – Ba Vì Ho Chi Minh Highway)
1.000 mi = 1.609 km; 1.000 km = 0.621 mi: Proposed; Incomplete access; Route transition; Unopened
