= North–South Expressway West =

Road in Vietnam

CT.02 Expressway
- North-South Expressway West
- Đường cao tốc Bắc–Nam phía Tây
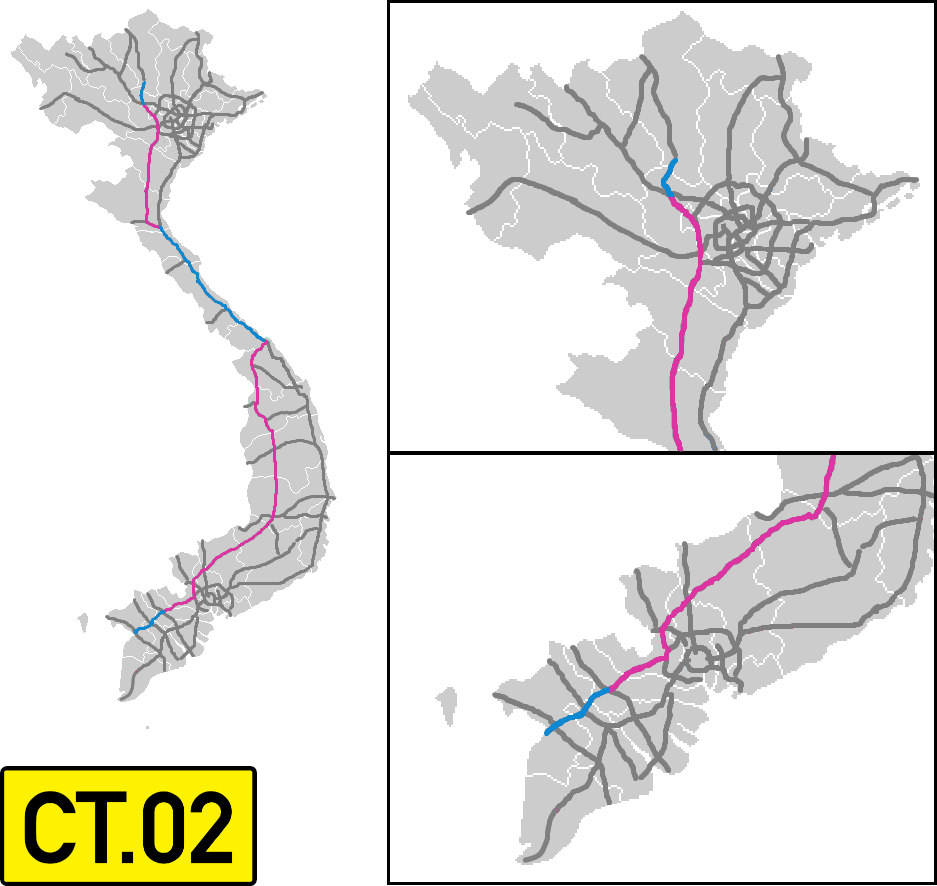
- Map of the CT.02 expressway with operational (blue) and under construction (pink) sections

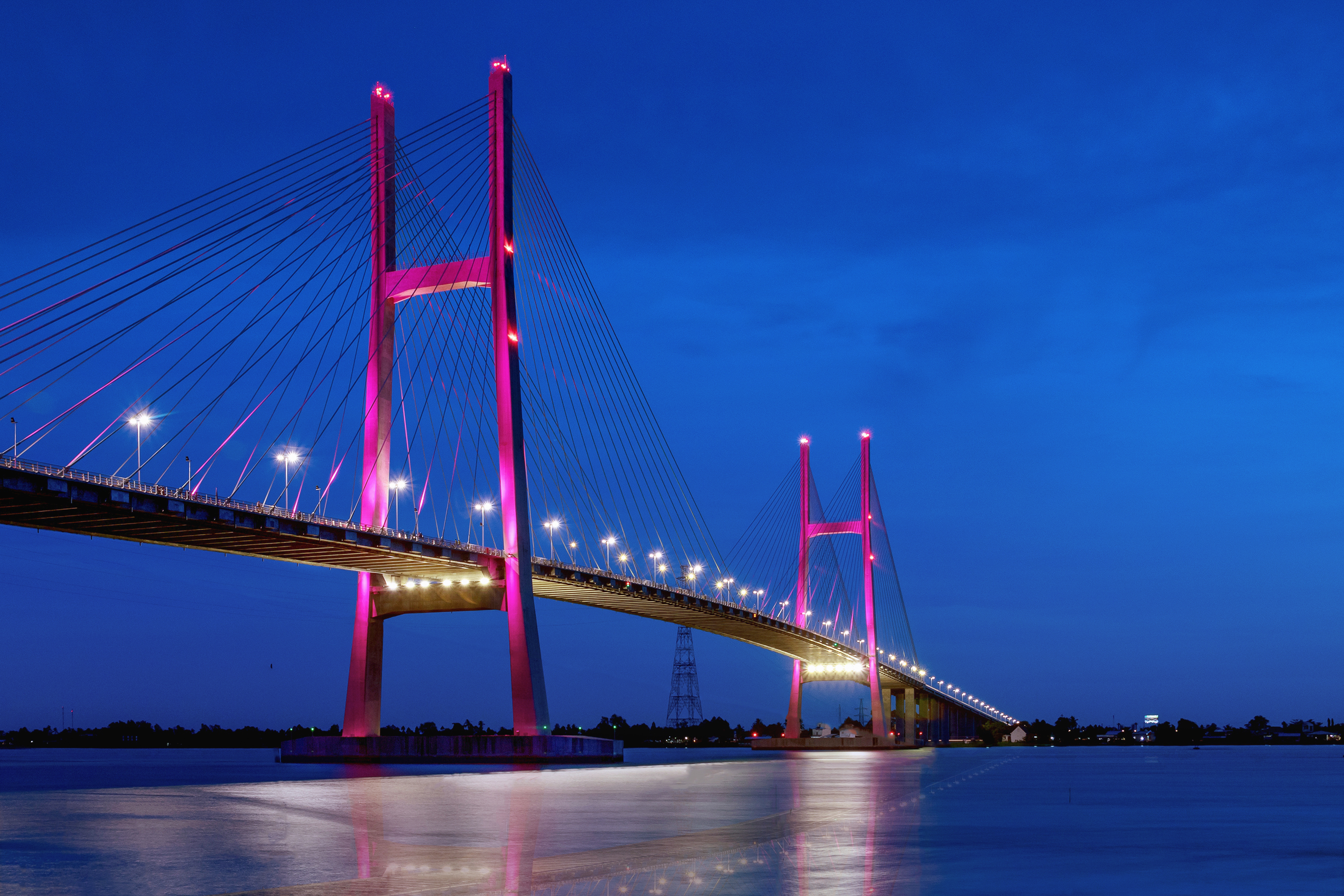
- Cao Lãnh bridge over the Tiền River

Route information
- Part of (Ring Road 5 (Hanoi) (Rộ - Vinh); AH1 (Nghệ An - Đà Nẵng) (Đà Nẵng - Ngọc Hồi) (Ring Road 4 HCMC)
- Maintained by Vietnam Expressway Corp (VEC)
- Length: 1,205 km (749 mi)
- Status: Under construction
- Existed: 19/5/2019–present

Major junctions
- North end: at Tuyên Quang, Tuyên Quang Province
- South end: Rạch Giá bypass, Kiên Giang

Location
- Country: Vietnam
- Provinces: CB, BK, TN, TQ, PT, HN, HB, TH, NA, HT, QB, QT, HU, DNa, KT, ĐL, ĐNo, BP, LA, ĐT, CT, KG

Highway system
- Transport in Vietnam
← CT.01	→ CT.03

The North–South Expressway West (Vietnamese: Đường cao tốc Bắc – Nam phía Tây) is a partially completed expressway in Vietnam that will form an inland parallel route to the North–South expressway. It will run from Đoan Hùng to Rạch Sỏi in the Mekong Delta, following a similar route to the historic Ho Chi Minh Highway. Between Hà Tĩnh and Da Nang, the narrowest part of Vietnam, it will be concurrent with the North–South Expressway.

== History ==
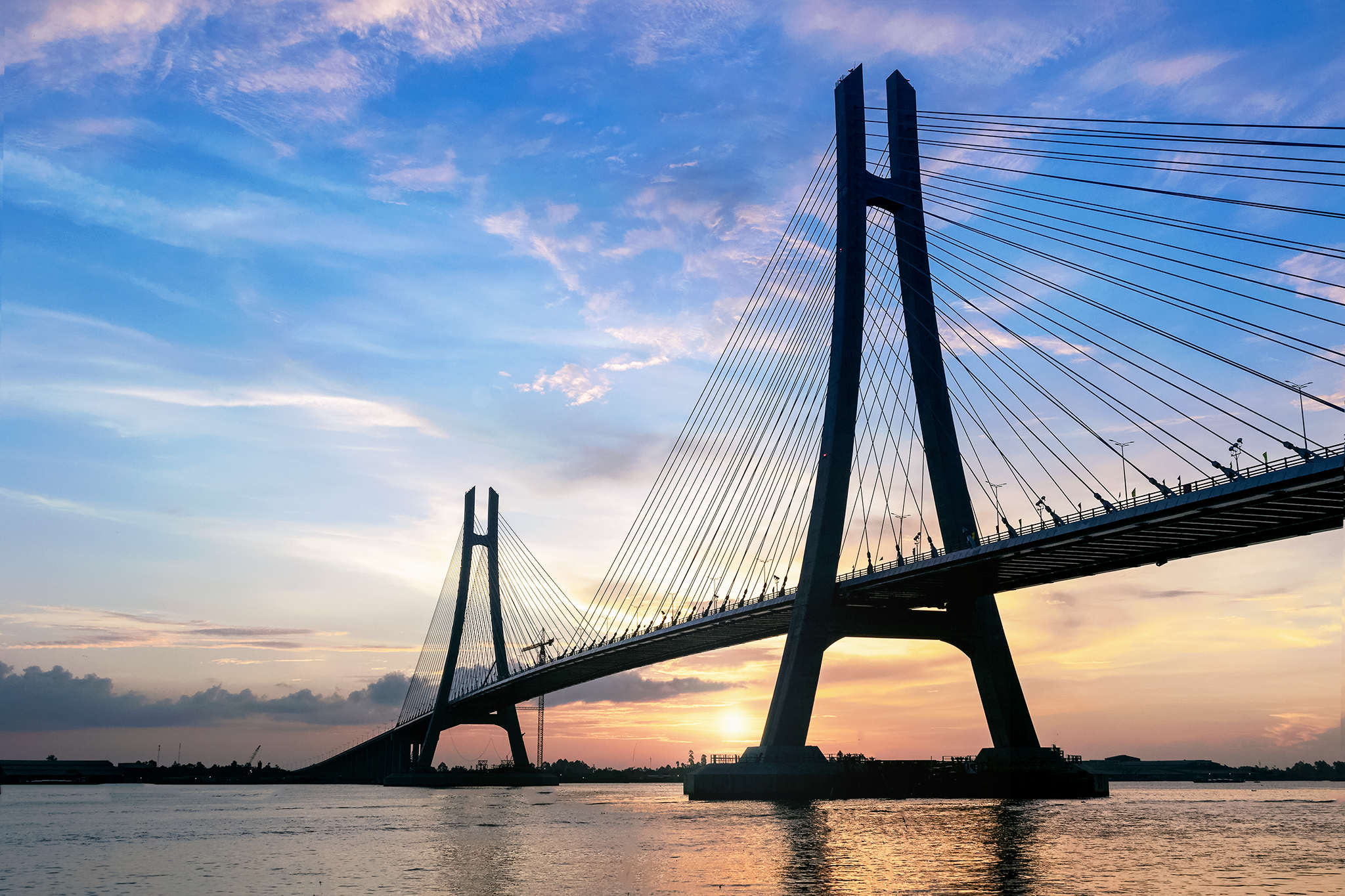
Vàm Cống bridge

The section Cao Lãnh - Lộ Tẻ opened in May 2018 and includes two major cable-stayed bridges, Cao Lãnh bridge over the Tiền River, and Vàm Cống bridge over the Hậu River. These bridges replaced ferry services, also carrying lanes for slower traffic.

The section Lộ Tẻ - Rạch Sỏi was completed in January 2021, however only as a 2x2 lane trunk road, pending future upgrade to full expressway standard. The section was constructed at a cost of VND 6,355 billion (US$270 million), partially financed by the Korean government through a development loan.

== Status ==
The North–South Expressway West (Vietnamese: Đường cao tốc Bắc – Nam phía Tây) is a partially completed expressway in Vietnam. When completed, it will form a road parallel to the North-South Expressway along with National Route 1 and Vietnam Coastal Road. The expressway has a total length of about 1,205 km, divided into 16 sections, passing through 23 provinces and cities: Tuyên Quang, Phú Thọ, Hanoi, Hòa Bình, Thanh Hoa, Nghe An, Hà Tĩnh, Quang Binh, Quảng Trị, Huế, Đà Nẵng, Quang Nam, Kon Tum, Gia Lai, Dak Lak, Dak Nong, Binh Phuoc, Binh Duong, Tay Ninh, Long An, Dong Thap, Can Tho, Kien Giang. Most of the expressway is upgraded from Ho Chi Minh Highway phase 3. CT.02 also part of CT.01

== List of Expressway segments ==
Number	Stage	Name	Start	End	Length (km)	Lanes Planning	Current lanes	Speed	Construction Start	Expected completion	Complete	Time Construction	Extend
1	2021	Tuyen Quang - Phu Tho Expressway	IC9 Noi Bai - Lao Cai Expressway	National Route 2D at Tuyên Quang	40.2	4	4	90 km/h	23/2/2021		24/12/2023	2 years, 10 months, 1 day	-
2	Before 2030	Phu Tho - Ba Vi (Hanoi) Expressway	-	-	55	6	-	100 km/h	-	-	-	-	-
3	Before 2030	Ba Vi (Hanoi) - Cho Ben (Hoa Binh) Expressway	-	-	57	6	-	100 km/h	-	-	-	-	-
4	After 2030	Cho Ben (Hoa Binh) - Thach Quang (Thanh Hoa) Expressway	-	-	62	4	-	-	-	-	-	-	-
5	After 2030	Thach Quang (Thanh Hoa) - Tan Ky (Nghe An) Expressway	-	-	173	4	-	-	-	-	-	-	-
6	After 2030	Tan Ky - Tri Le (Nghe An) Expressway	-	-	19	4	-	-	-	-	-	-	-
7	After 2030	Tri Le - Ro (Nghe An) Expressway	-	-	40	4	-	-	-	-	-	-	-
8	Before 2030	Ro - Vinh (Nghe An)	Part of
9	2021-25	Vinh (Nghe An) - Tuy Loan (Da Nang) Expressway	Part of
10	After 2030	Tuy Loan (Da Nang) - Ngoc Hoi (Kon Tum) Expressway	Part of
11	Before 2030	Ngoc Hoi (Kon Tum) - Pleiku (Gia Lai) Expressway	-	-	90	6	-	-	-	-	-	-	-
12	Before 2030	Pleiku (Gia Lai) - Buon Ma Thuot (Dak Lak) Expressway	-	-	160	6	-	-	-	-	-	-	-
13	Before 2030	Buon Ma Thuot (Dak Lak) - Gia Nghia (Dak Nong) Expressway	-	-	105	6	-	-	-	-	-	-	-
14	Before 2030	Gia Nghia (Dak Nong) - Chon Thanh (Binh Phuoc) Expressway	-	-	140	6	-	-	-	-	-	-	-
15	Before 2030	Chon Thanh (Binh Phuoc) - Duc Hoa (Long An) Expressway	-	-	84	6	-	-	-	-	-	-	-
16	Before 2030	Duc Hoa - Thanh Hoa (Long An) Expressway	-	-	33	6	-	-	-	-	-	-	-
17	Before 2030	Thanh Hoa - Tan Thanh (Long An) Expressway	-	-	16	6	-	-	-	-	-	-	-
18	Before 2030	Tan Thanh (Long An) - My An (Dong Thap)	-	-	25	6	-	-	-	-	-	-	-
19	Before 2030	My An - Cao Lanh (Dong Thap) Expressway	-	-	26	6	-	-	-	-	-	-	-
20	Before 2030	Cao Lanh (Dong Thap) - Vam Cong (Can Tho) Expressway	Cao Lãnh, Đồng Tháp	Vĩnh Thạnh, Cần Thơ	29	6	4	80 km/h	19/10/2013	7/2017	19/5/2019	5 years, 7 months	-
21		Lo Te (Can Tho) - Rach Soi (Kien Giang) Expressway	Km 02+104.11 Vinh Thanh District, Cần Thơ City	Km 53+553 Chau Thanh District, Kiên Giang Province (connected to the Rach Gia City bypass.)	51	6	4	80 km/h	17/1/2016	15/10/2020	12/2/2021	4 years, 11 months. 26 days	-

Note

Construction not started	Under Construction	Completed	Slow progress
