= Trấn Yên district =

Coordinates: 21.667°N 104.833°E

Trấn Yên District Huyện Trấn Yên
- District
- Interactive map of Trấn Yên District
- Country: Vietnam
- Region: Northeast
- Province: Yên Bái
- Capital: Cổ Phúc

Area
  - Total: 267 sq mi (691 km^{2})

Population (2003)
  - Total: 96,949
- Time zone: UTC+7 (UTC + 7)

Trấn Yên is a former rural district of Yên Bái province, in the northeastern region of Vietnam.

As of 2003 the district had a population of 96,949. The district covers an area of 691 km^{2} (267 sq mi). The district capital lies at Cổ Phúc.

== Administrative districts ==
Tran Yen district has 21 commune-level administrative units, including Cổ Phúc town (district capital) and 20 communes: Báo Đáp, Bảo Hưng, Cường Thịnh, Đào Thịnh, Hòa Cuông, Hồng Ca, Hưng Khánh, Hưng Thịnh, Kiên Thành, Lương Thịnh, Minh Quán, Minh Quân, Nga Quán, Quy Mông, Tân Đồng, Vân Hội, Việt Cường, Việt Hồng, Việt Thành, Y Can.
