= Hưng Thịnh =

Hưng Thịnh is a commune of Đồng Nai province, Vietnam. However, Hưng Thịnh may also refer to the following defunct placenames in Vietnam:

- Hưng Thịnh, Nghệ An: a former commune of Hưng Nguyên district, now part of Hưng Nguyên
- Hưng Thịnh, Yên Bái: a former commune of Trấn Yên district, now part of Lương Thịnh
- Hưng Thịnh, Cao Bằng: a former commune of Bảo Lạc district, now part of Hưng Đạo, Cao Bằng
