= G8012 Mile–Chuxiong Expressway =

Road in Yunnan, China

Mile–Chuxiong Expressway
- 弥勒－楚雄高速公路
- Michu Expressway 弥楚高速公路

Route information
- Auxiliary route of G80
- Length: 306.02 km (190.15 mi)

Major junctions
- West end: G56 / Yunnan S45 in Chuxiong, Chuxiong Yi, Yunnan
- East end: G80 / S305 in Mile, Honghe Hani and Yi, Yunnan

Location
- Country: China

Highway system
- National Trunk Highway System; Primary; Auxiliary; National Highways; Transport in China
← G8011	→ G8013

The G8012 Mile–Chuxiong Expressway (Chinese: 弥勒—楚雄高速公路), also referred to as the Michu Expressway (Chinese: 弥楚高速公路), is an expressway in Yunnan, China that connects the cities of Mile and Chuxiong via Yuxi.
