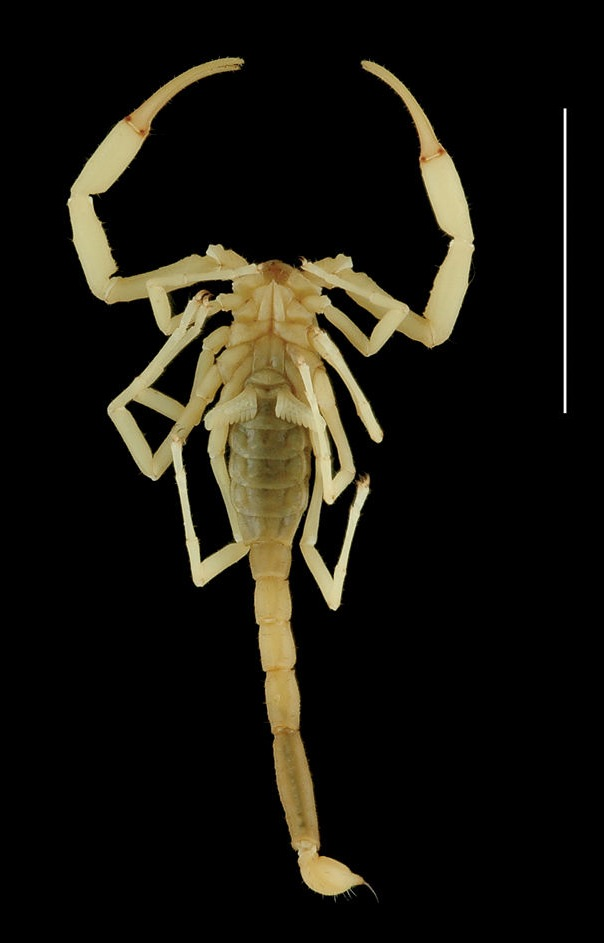

Scientific classification
- Domain: Eukaryota
- Kingdom: Animalia
- Phylum: Arthropoda
- Subphylum: Chelicerata
- Class: Arachnida
- Order: Scorpiones
- Family: Pseudochactidae
- Genus: Vietbocap
- Species: V. canhi

Binomial name
- Vietbocap canhi Lourenço & Pham, 2010

= Vietbocap canhi =

Species of scorpion

Vietbocap canhi is a species of troglobiontic scorpions in the family Pseudochactidae native to Vietnam.
