= G8013 Yanshan–Wenshan Expressway =

Road in Yunnan, China

Yanshan–Wenshan Expressway
- 砚山－文山高速公路
- Yanwen Expressway 砚文高速公路

Route information
- Auxiliary route of G80
- Length: 38.2 km (23.7 mi)

Major junctions
- North end: G80 in Yanshan, Wenshan Zhuang and Miao, Yunnan
- South end: G5615 in Wenshan, Wenshan Zhuang and Miao, Yunnan

Location
- Country: China

Highway system
- National Trunk Highway System; Primary; Auxiliary; National Highways; Transport in China
← G8012	→ G85

The G8013 Yanshan–Wenshan Expressway (Chinese: 砚山—文山高速公路), also referred to as the Yanwen Expressway (Chinese: 砚文高速公路), is an expressway in Yunnan, China that connects the cities of Yanshan and Wenshan.
