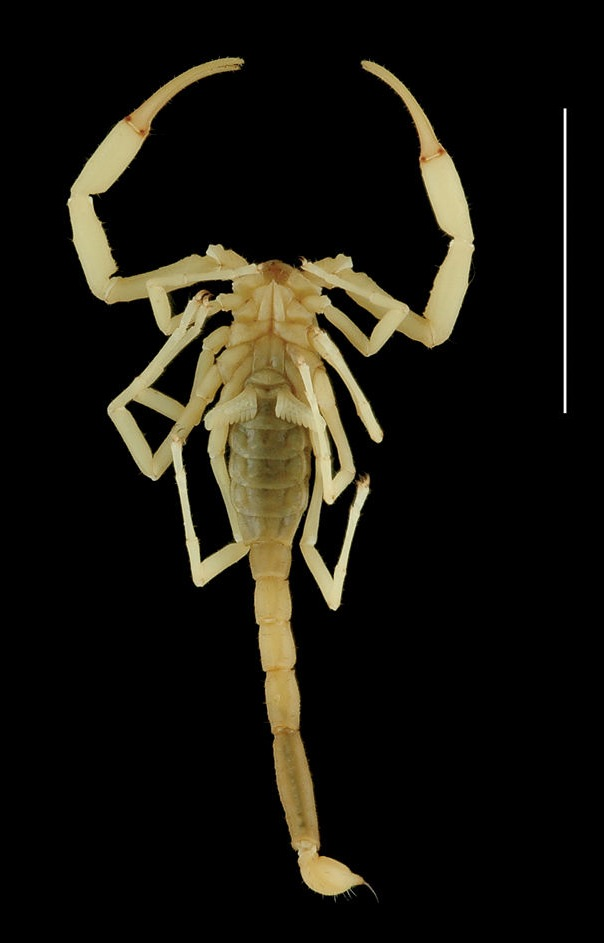

Conservation status
- CITES Appendix II (CITES)

Scientific classification
- Kingdom: Animalia
- Phylum: Arthropoda
- Subphylum: Chelicerata
- Class: Arachnida
- Order: Scorpiones
- Family: Pseudochactidae
- Genus: Vietbocap
- Species: V. thienduongensis

Binomial name
- Vietbocap thienduongensis Lourenço & Pham, 2012

= Vietbocap thienduongensis =

Species of scorpion

Vietbocap thienduongensis (Vietnamese: Bọ cạp Thiên Đường, literally "Paradise scorpion") is a species of scorpion in the family Pseudochactidae. This species was described by Phạm Đình Sắc (Institute of Ecology and Biological Resources (IEBR), an organ under the Vietnam Academy of Science and Technology (VAST)) and Wilson Lourenço (Paris Museum of Natural History – National Museum of Natural History) inside Thiên Đường Cave, a cave located in Phong Nha-Kẻ Bàng National Park, Quảng Bình Province, Vietnam.
