= Thiên Đường Cave =

Cave in Vietnam

Thien Duong Cave
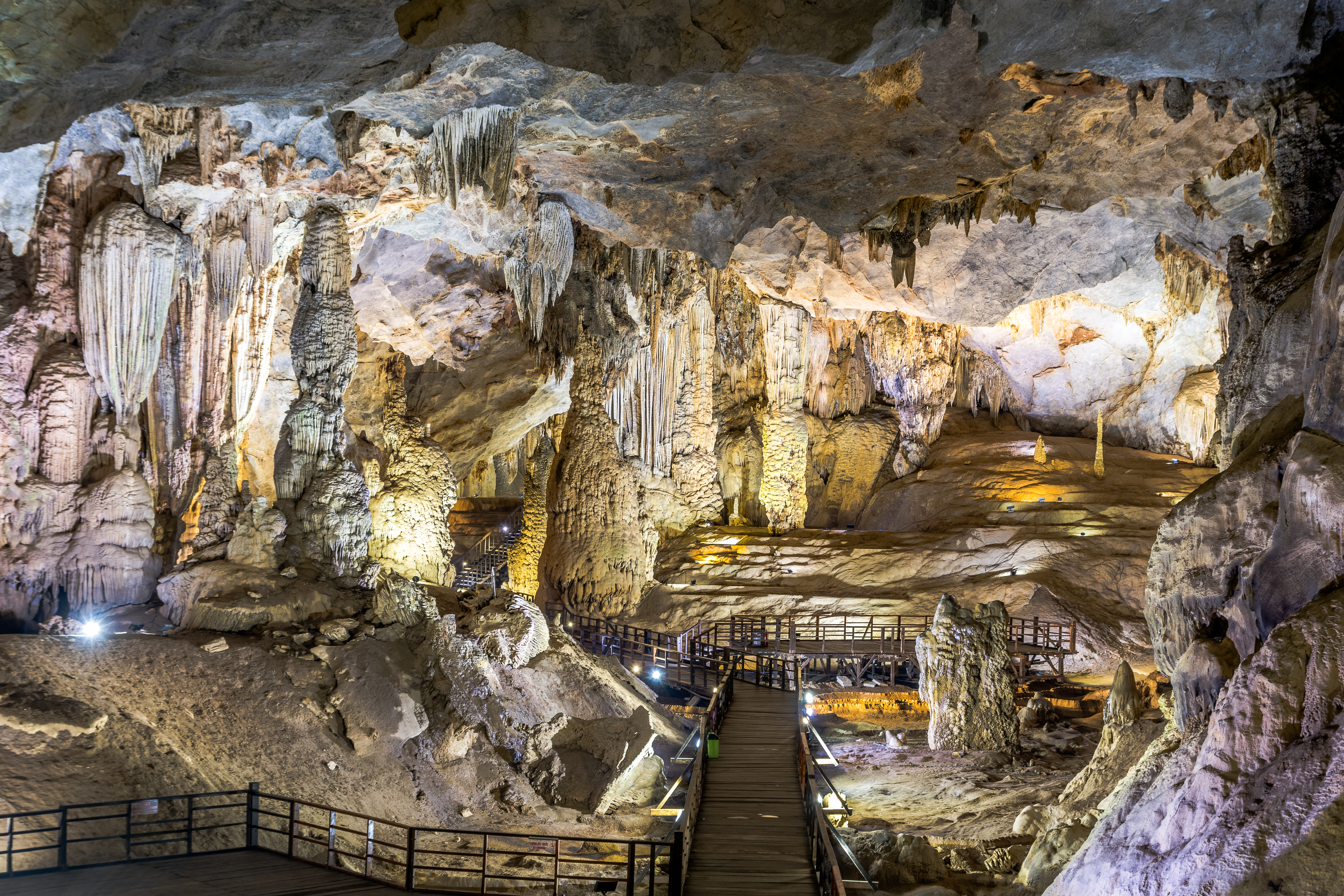
- Thien Duong Cave

- Location within Vietnam
- Location: Vietnam
- Coordinates: 17°31′11″N 106°13′22″E
- Depth: Unknown
- Length: 31 km
- Discovery: 2005
- Cave survey: 2005-2010

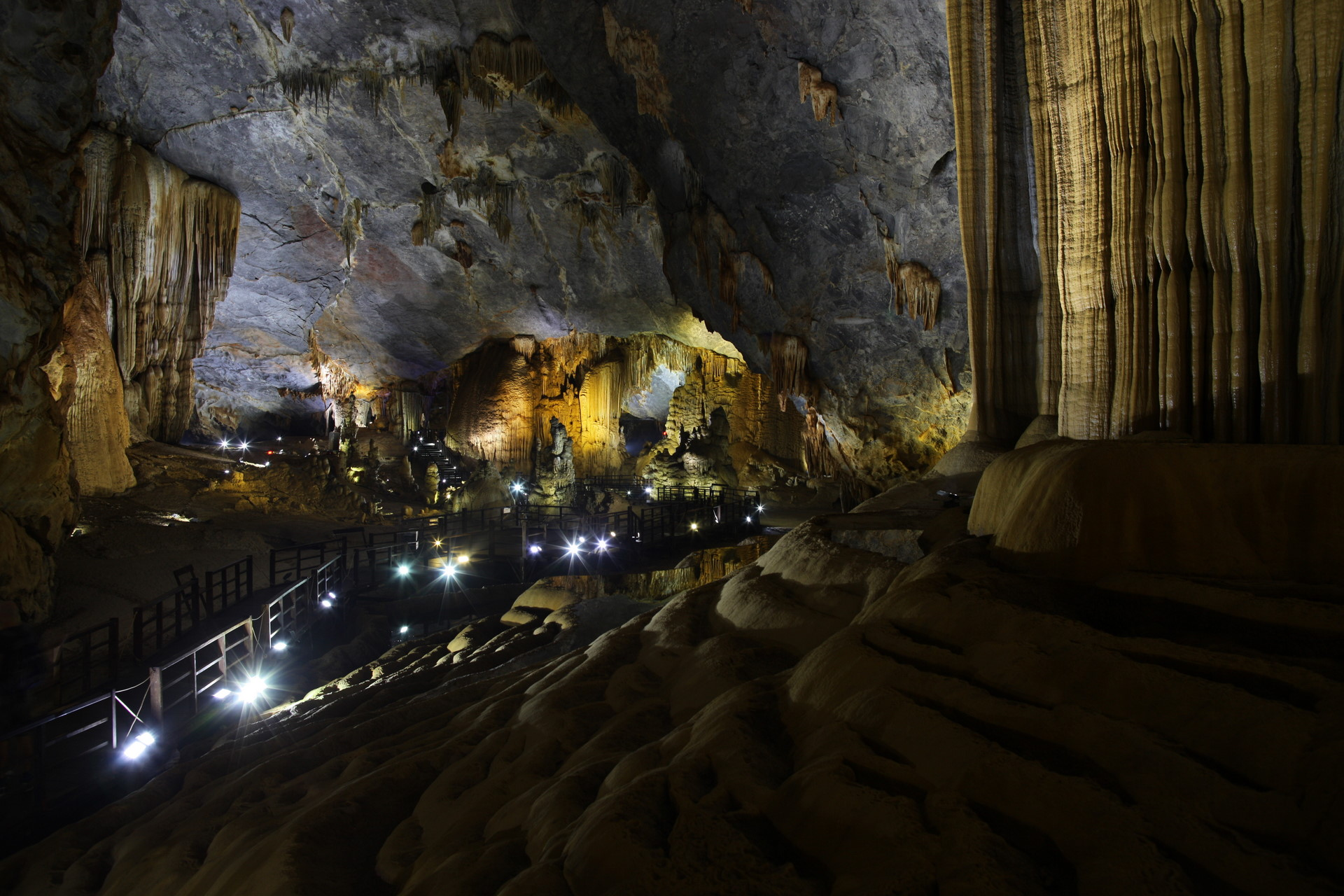
Thien Duong Cave

Thiên Đường Cave (Paradise Cave) is a cave in Phong Nha-Kẻ Bàng National Park, UNESCO's World Heritage Site, 60 km northwest of Đồng Hới city. Thiên Đường Cave is located on an elevation of 350 meters above the sea level, near the west branch of Ho Chi Minh Highway, in Son Trach Commune, Bố Trạch District, Quảng Bình Province, Vietnam. The cave was discovered by a local man in 2005 and the first 5 km of this cave was explored by explorers from British Cave Research Association in 2005, the whole 31 km was explored and publicly announced by the British cave explorers. This cave is 31 km long, longer than Phong Nha Cave which had been considered the longest cave in this national park. The height can reach to 72 m and 150 m wide. The limestone formation is also more spectacular than that of Phong Nha Cave. The British cave explorers were impressed by the beautiful and spectacular stalactites and stalagmites inside this cave and they named it Thiên Đường Cave (Paradise Cave). In 2012, a new species of troglobiontic scorpion species, Vietbocap thienduongensis was found in here.

== Tourist activities ==
The access road and internal road of this cave was built by a local company (Truong Thinh Group) and the cave has been opened to tourists since 3 September 2010. The car park is 1.6 km from the entry of the cave, and tourists can go by golf cart or walk on a paved road to the cave mouth. Only 1 km is open for tourists without a tour guide. It is possible to travel 7km into the cave with an adventure tour.

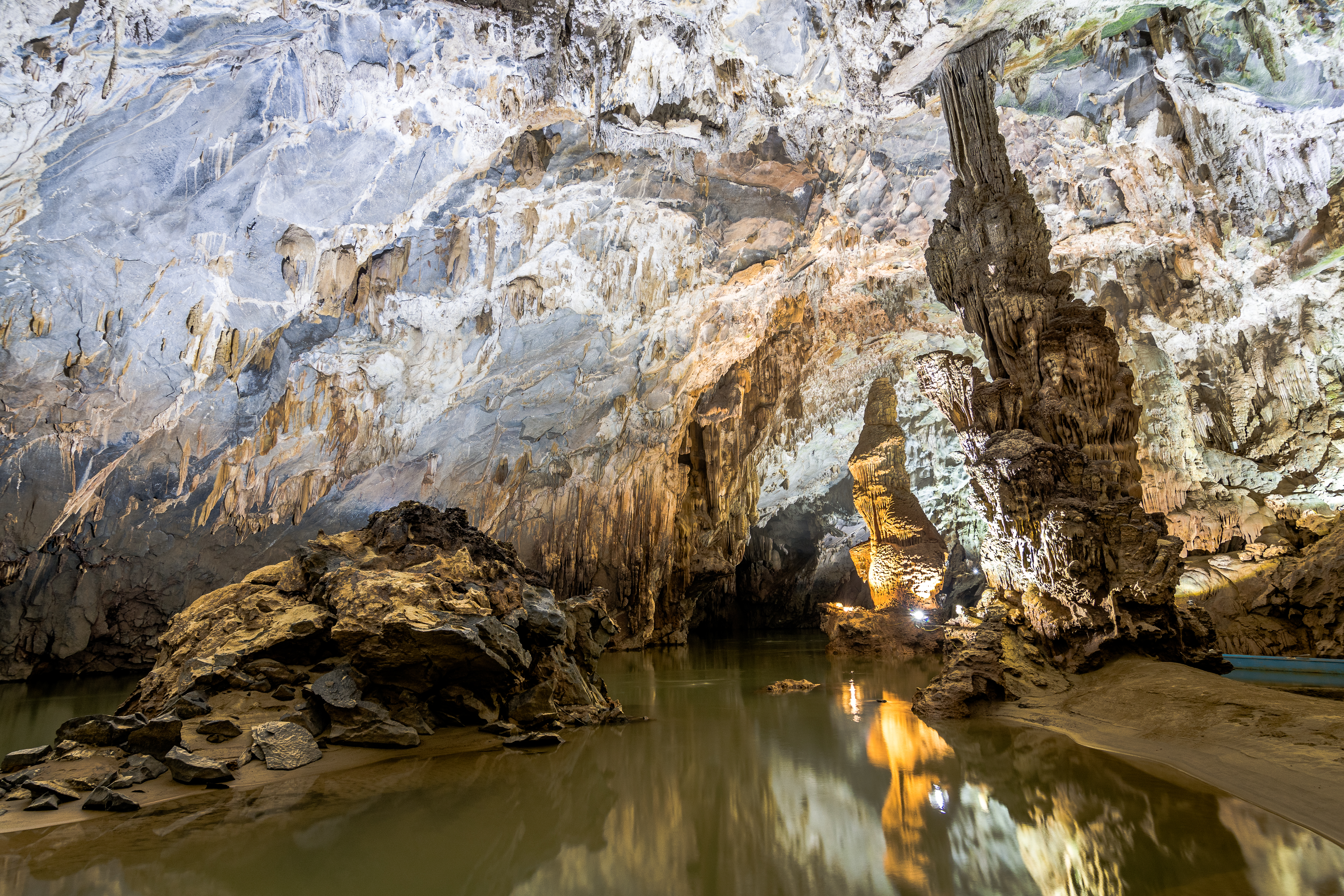

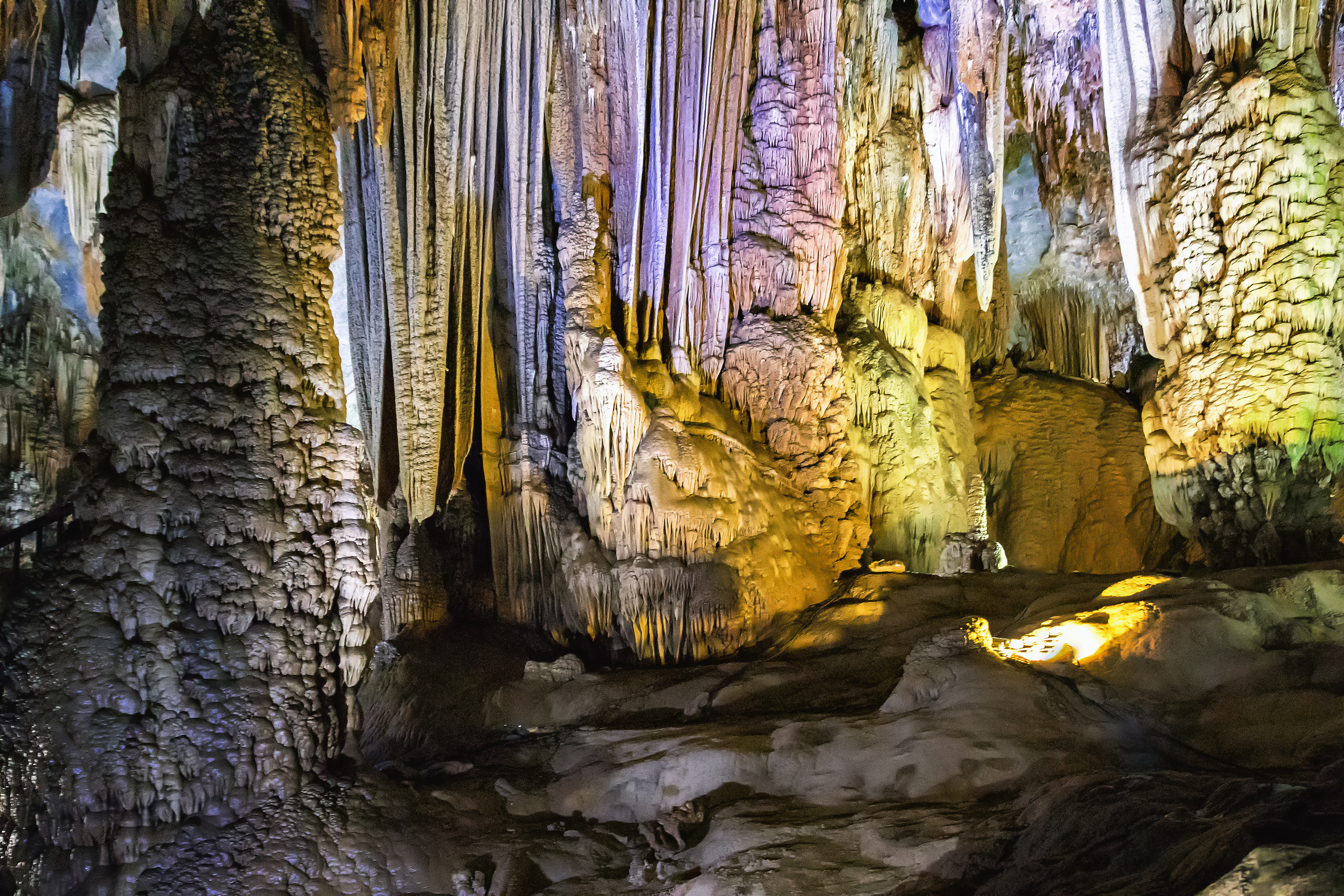

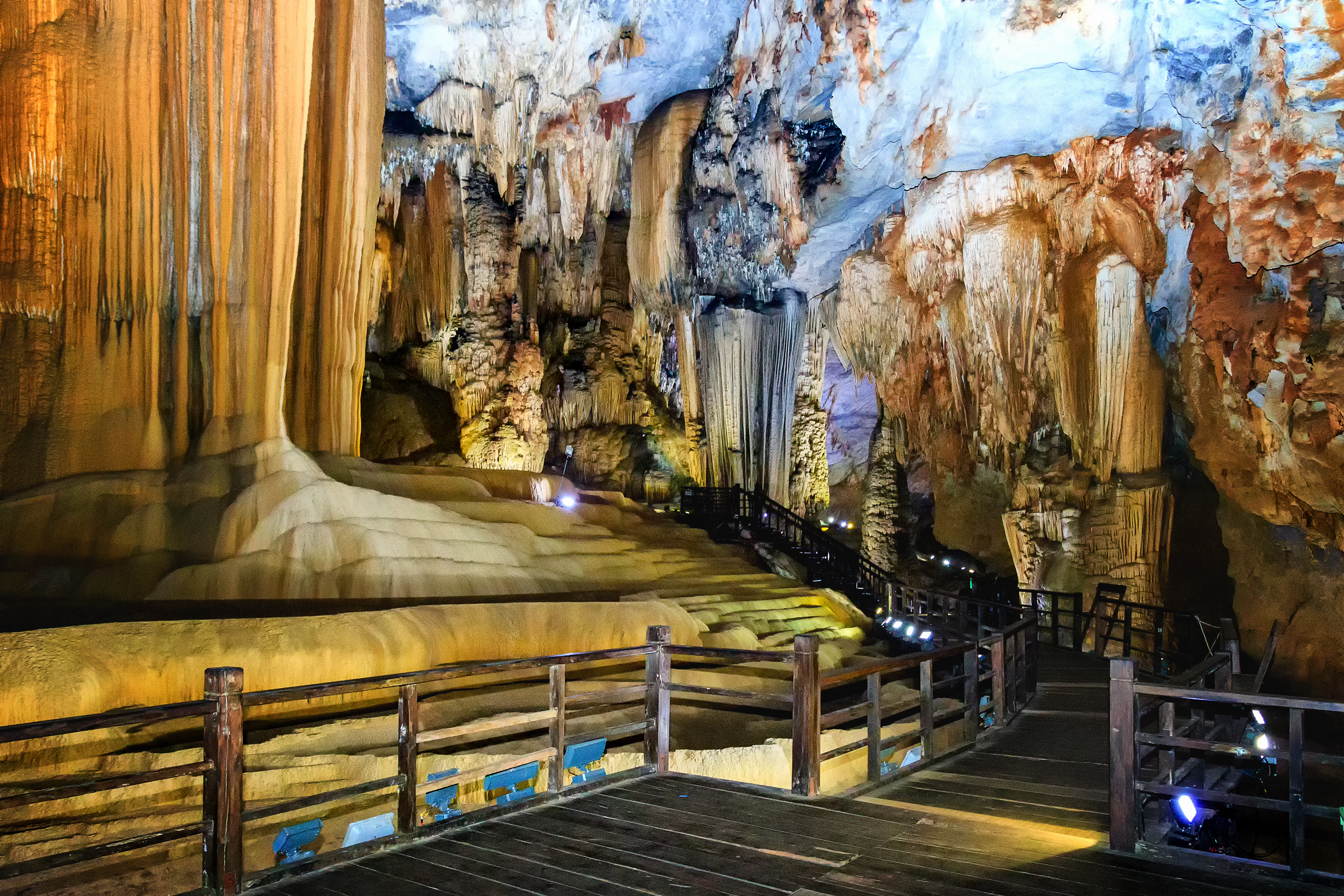

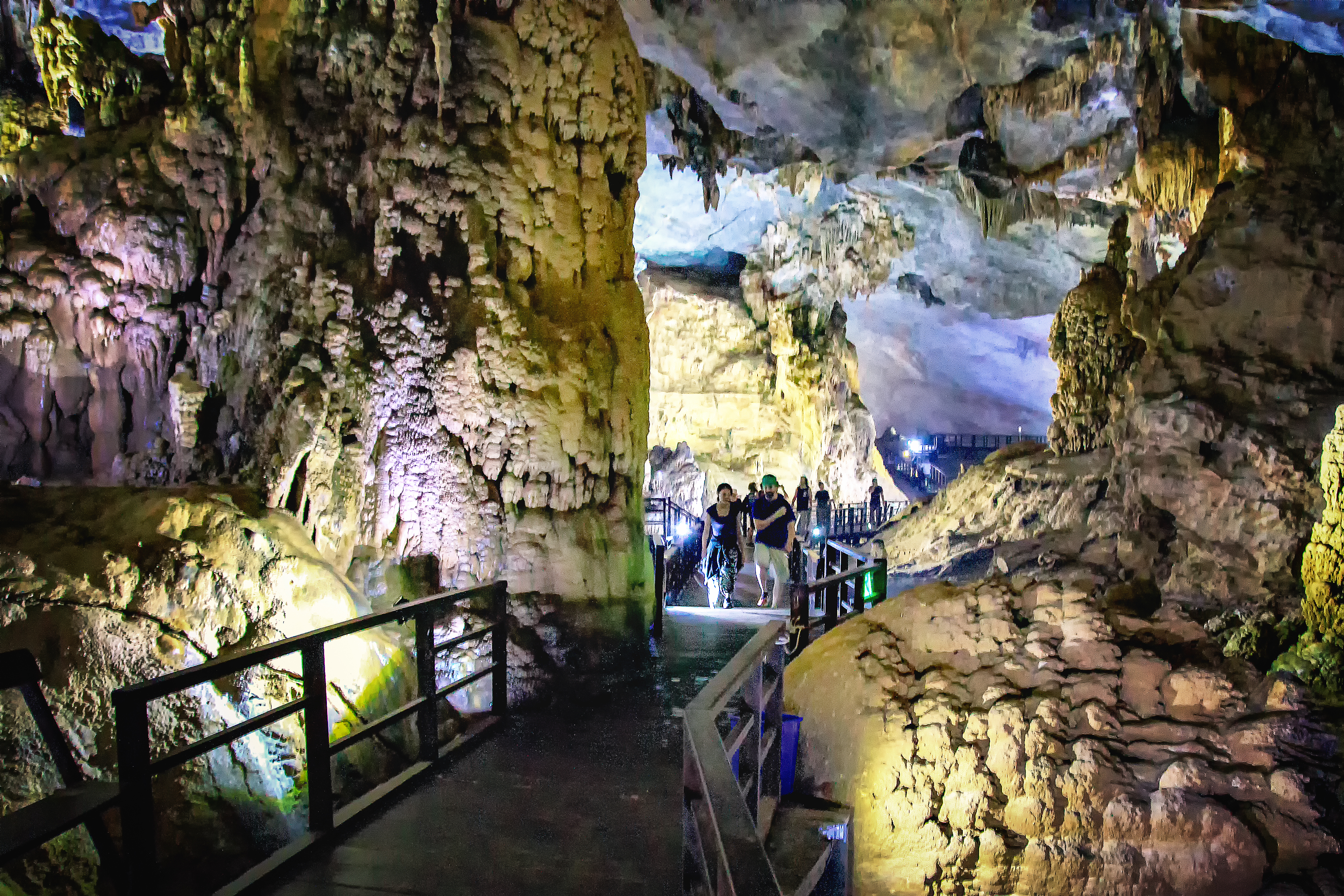

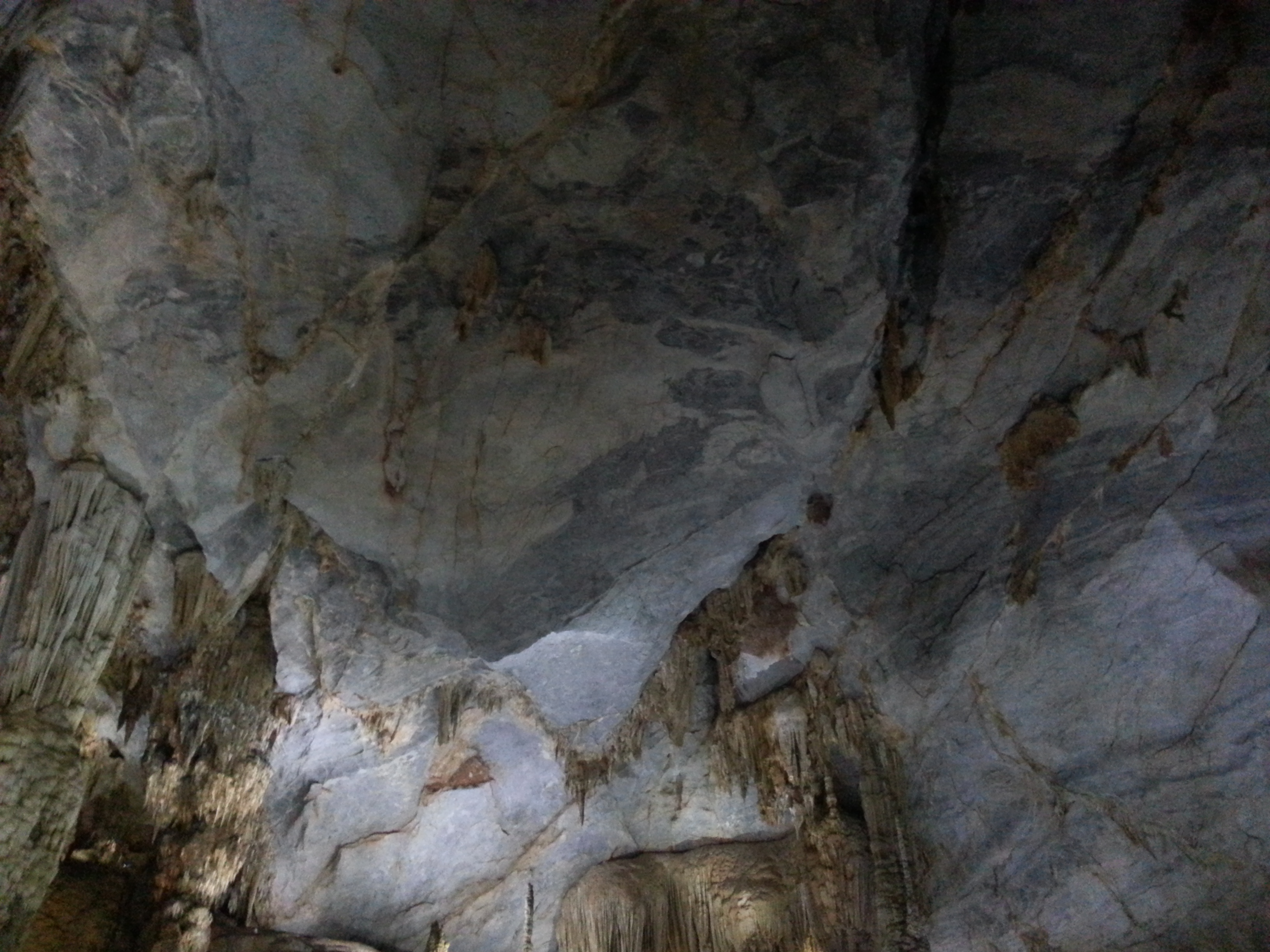

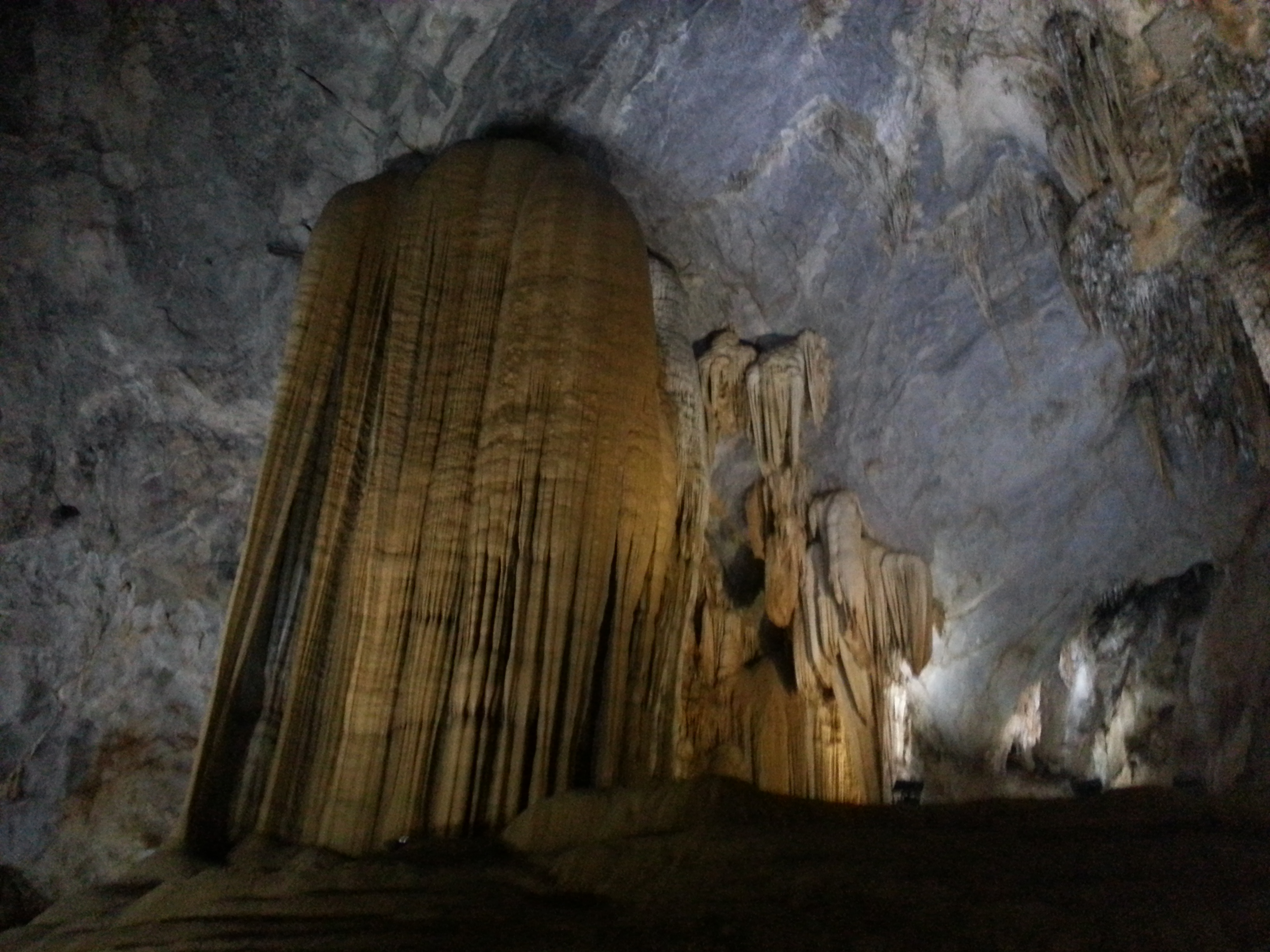

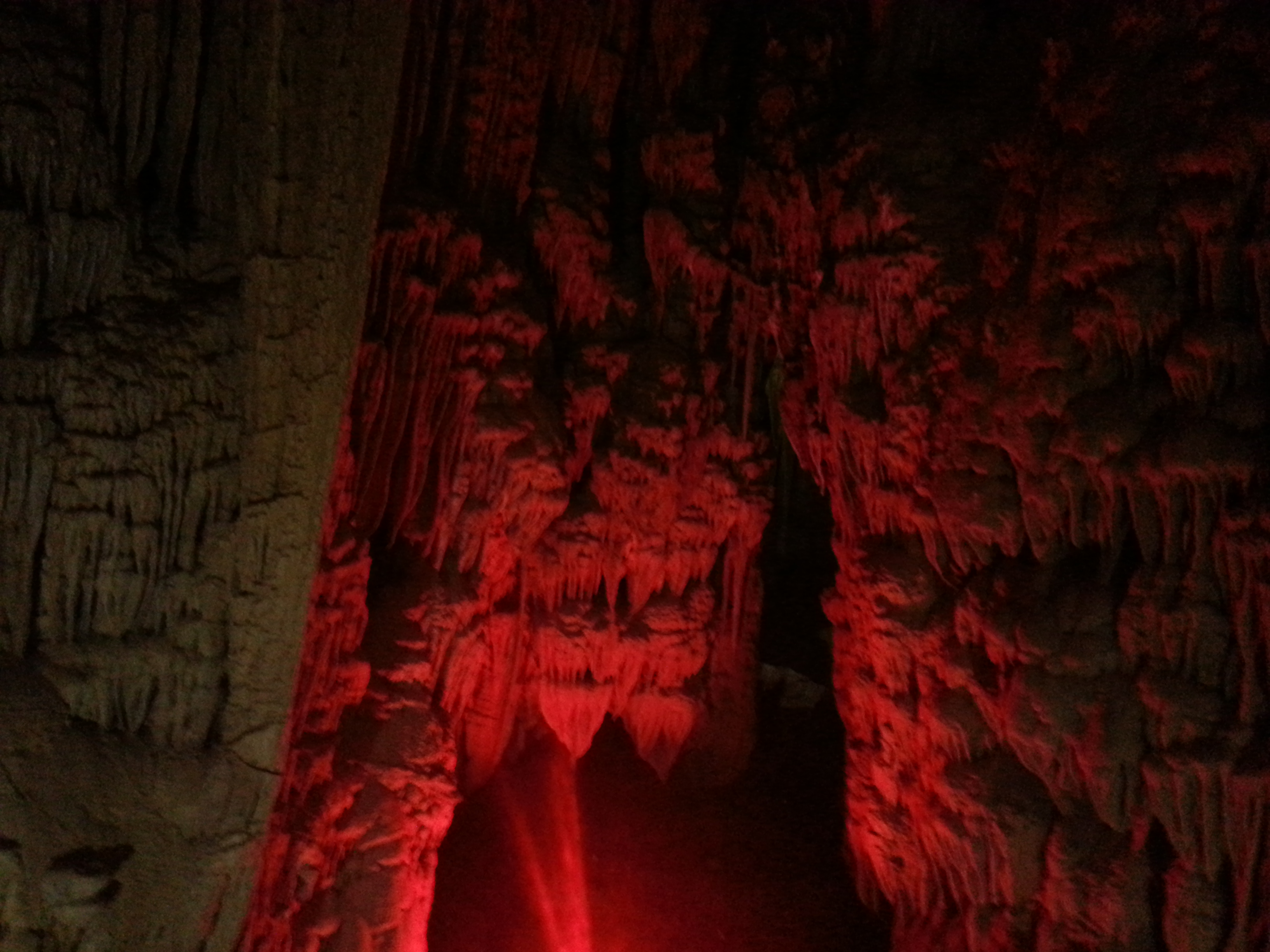

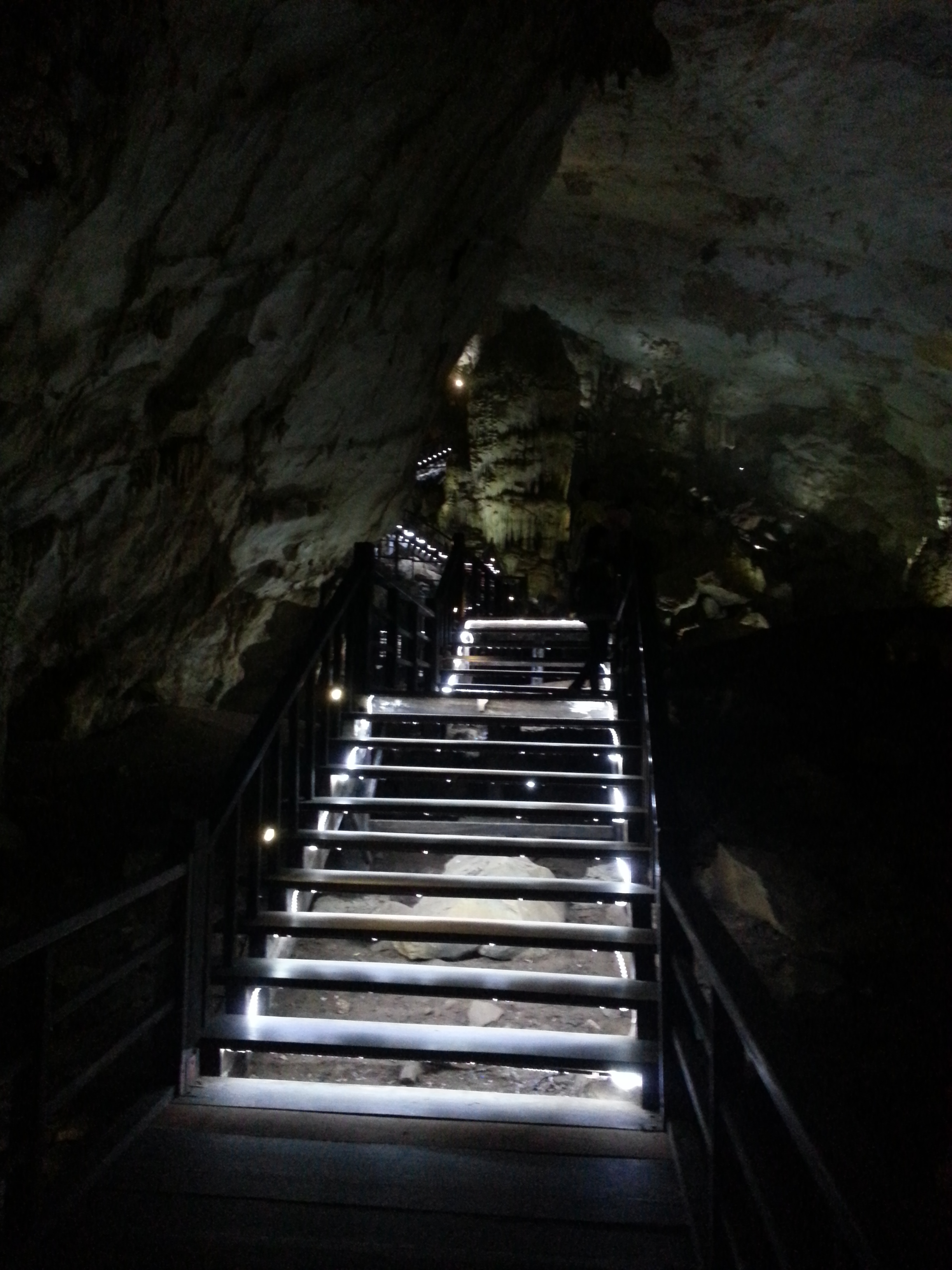

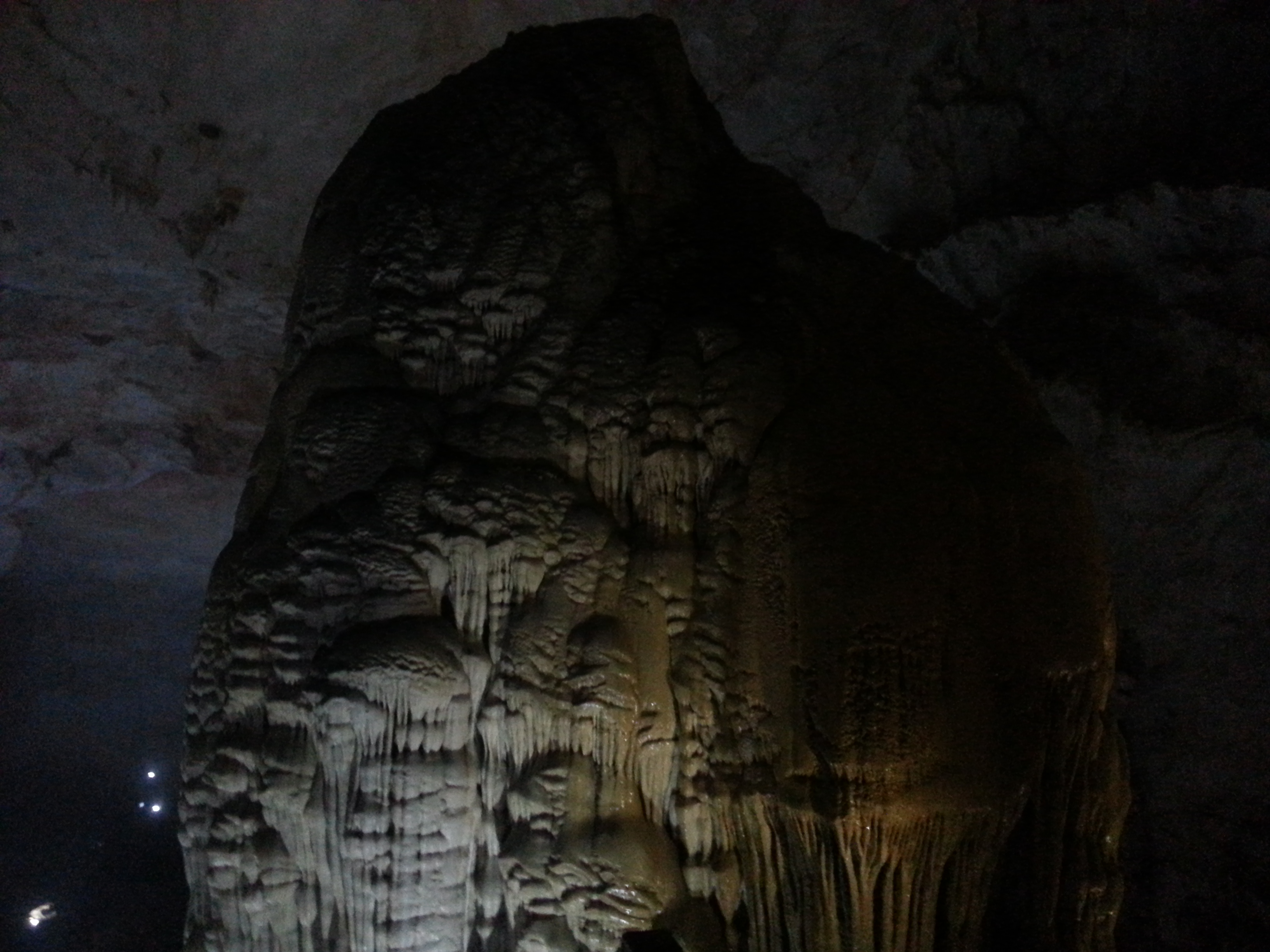

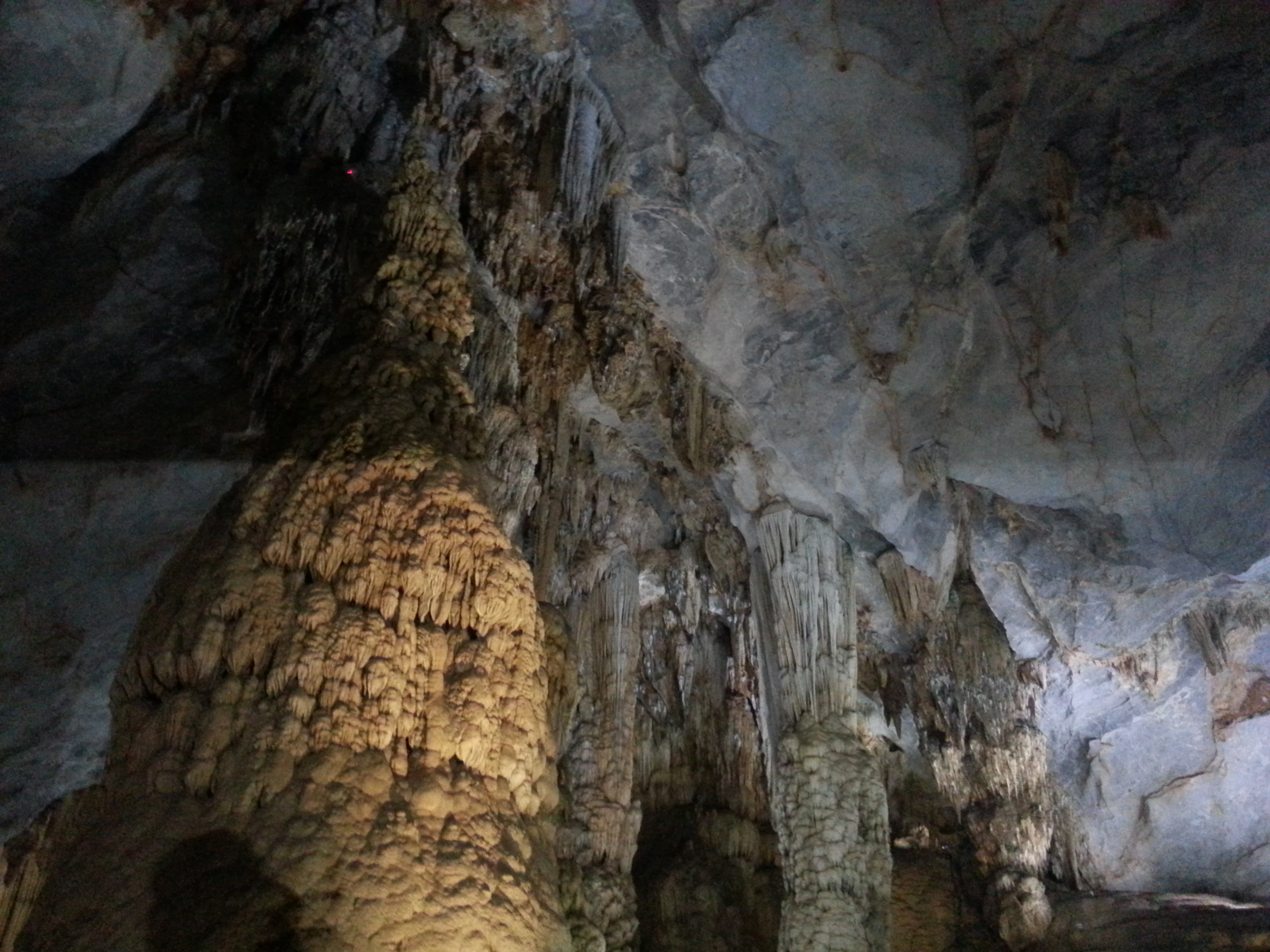

== See also ==
- Hang Sơn Đoòng
- Hang Én
