= Đoan Hùng district =

District in Northeast, Vietnam

Coordinates: 21.6239°N 105.1845°E

Đoan Hùng district Huyện Đoan Hùng
- District
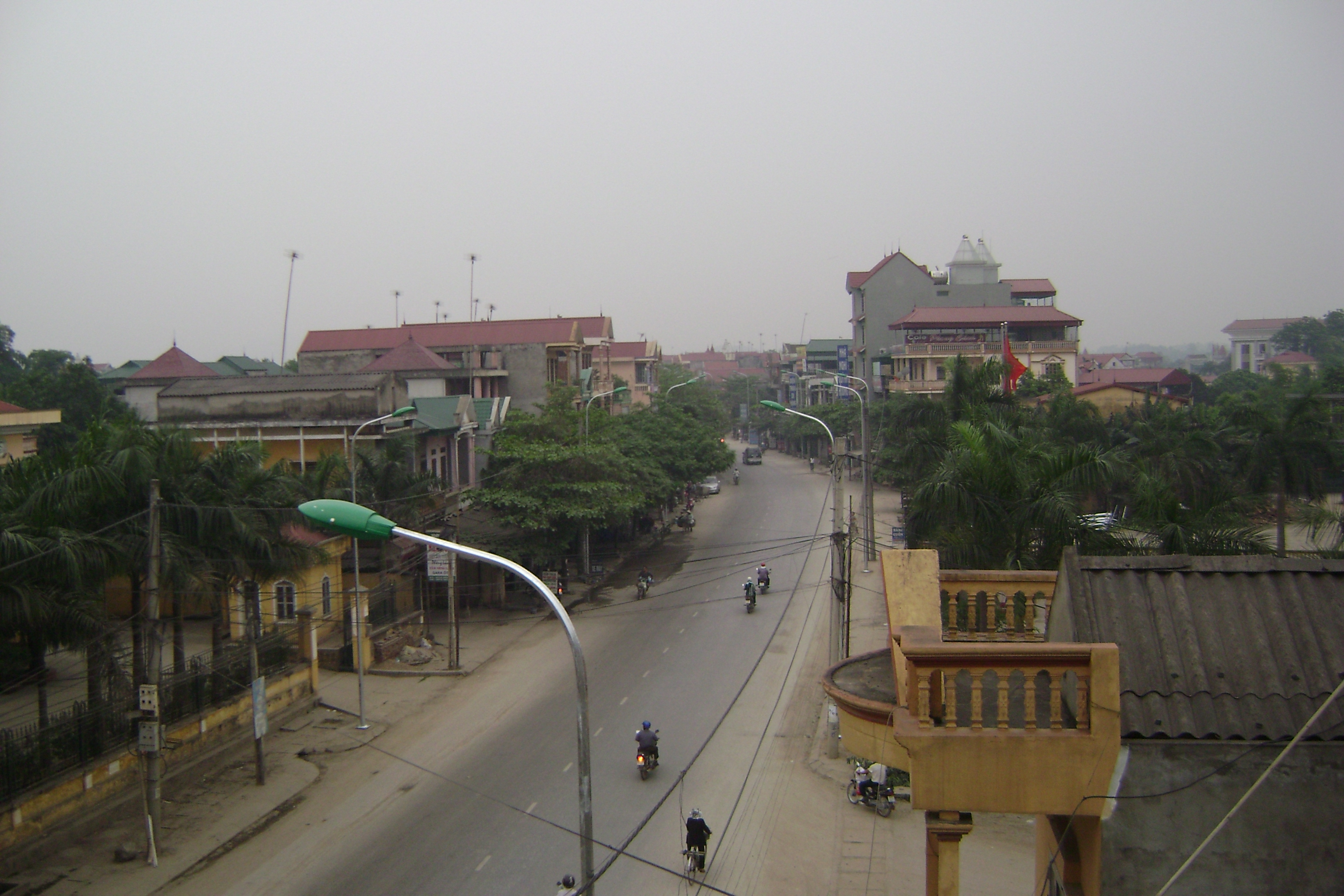
- Overlooking one of the main streets
- Country: Vietnam
- Region: Northeast
- Province: Phú Tho
- Capital: Đoan Hùng

Area
  - District: 117 sq mi (302 km^{2})

Population (2019)
  - District: 107.966
  - Density: 980/sq mi (379/km^{2})
  - Urban: 7.165
- Time zone: UTC+7 (Indochina Time)
- Website: doanhung.phutho.gov.vn

Đoan Hùng is a former rural district of Phú Thọ province in the Northeast region of Vietnam. As of 2003 the district had a population of 105,242. The district covers an area of 302 km^{2}. The district capital lies at Đoan Hùng.

== Divisions ==
The district consists of the district capital, Đoan Hùng, and 27 communes: Đông Khê, Nghinh Xuyên, Hùng Quan, Vân Du, Chí Đám, Hữu Đô, Đại Nghĩa, Phú Thứ, Hùng Long, Vụ Quang, Minh Phú, Chân Mộng, Vân Đồn, Minh Tiến, Tiêu Sơn, Yên Kiện, Sóc Đăng, Ngọc Quan, Phong Phú, Phương Trung, Tây Cốc, Ca Đình, Phúc Lai, Quế Lâm, Bằng Luân, Bằng Doãn, and Minh Lương.
