= Aemngvantom =

Scientific classification
- Domain: Eukaryota
- Kingdom: Animalia
- Phylum: Arthropoda
- Subphylum: Chelicerata
- Class: Arachnida
- Order: Scorpiones
- Family: Pseudochactidae
- Genus: Aemngvantom; Prendini, Ehrenthal & Loria, 2021

Species
- Aemngvantom lao; Aemngvantom thamnongpaseuan

Genus of scorpions

Aemngvantom is a genus of scorpions belonging to the family Pseudochactidae, first described in 2021 by L. Prendini, V. Ehrenthal, and S. Loria.

== Taxonomy and naming ==
The genus name, Aemngvantom, was coined to classify species within the Pseudochactidae family that are morphologically distinct from other genera in the family. The genus currently includes two species: Aemngvantom lao and Aemngvantom thamnongpaseuan, both discovered in Laos.

== Morphology and identification ==
Members of the genus Aemngvantom are small to medium-sized scorpions with features typical of the family Pseudochactidae, including pale coloration and highly specialized pedipalps. These adaptations may aid in survival in low-light environments such as caves.

== Distribution ==
Species within the genus Aemngvantom are endemic to Laos, where they inhabit cave systems and forested areas. These scorpions are adapted to their unique environments, which are characterized by high humidity and limited light.
