= Troglokhammouanus =

Scientific classification
- Kingdom: Animalia
- Phylum: Arthropoda
- Subphylum: Chelicerata
- Class: Arachnida
- Order: Scorpiones
- Family: Pseudochactidae
- Genus: Troglokhammouanus; Lourenço, 2007
- Species: T. steineri

Binomial name
- Troglokhammouanus steineri Lourenço, 2007

Genus of scorpions

Troglokhammouanus is a monotypic genus of scorpions in the family Pseudochactidae, containing the single species Troglokhammouanus steineri. This genus was first described by Wilson R. Lourenço in 2007 based on specimens collected from the Tham Xe Bangfai cave in Khammouane Province, Laos.

== Taxonomy ==
The genus Troglokhammouanus was established to classify the species T. steineri, distinguished by specific morphological characteristics that set it apart from other genera within the Pseudochactidae family.

== Distribution and habitat ==
Troglokhammouanus steineri is endemic to Laos, specifically found in the Tham Xe Bangfai cave system in Khammouane Province. This species inhabits subterranean environments, adapting to the ecological conditions of limestone karst caves.

== Morphological characteristics ==
Members of this genus exhibit morphological adaptations consistent with cave-dwelling scorpions, including reduced pigmentation and elongated appendages. These traits are typical of troglobitic organisms, which have evolved to thrive in the absence of light.
