= G8011 Kaiyuan–Hekou Expressway =

Road in China

Kaiyuan–Hekou Expressway
- 开源－河口高速公路
- Kaihe Expressway 开河高速公路
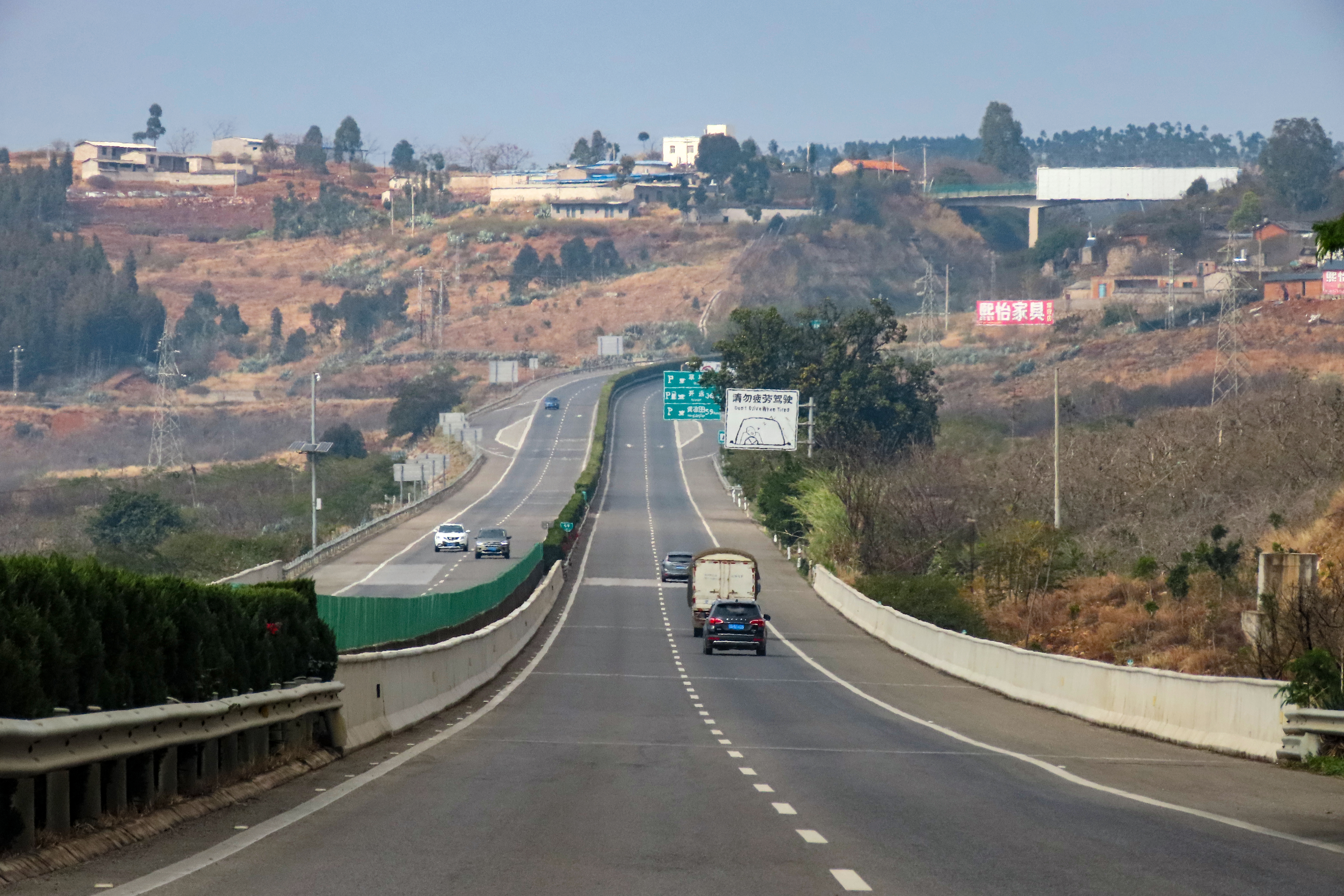
- G8011 Expressway near Mengzi City

Route information
- Auxiliary route of G80
- Part of AH14
- Length: 222 km (138 mi)

Major junctions
- North end: Kaiyuan, Honghe Hani and Yi Autonomous Prefecture, Yunnan (when complete); China National Highway 326 Honghe Road, Mengzi, Honghe Hani and Yi Autonomous Prefecture, Yunnan (current)
- South end: Yunnan Provincial Highway 209, Hekou, Hekou Yao Autonomous County, Honghe Hani and Yi Autonomous Prefecture, Yunnan; Towards / Hanoi–Lao Cai Expressway

Location
- Country: China

Highway system
- National Trunk Highway System; Primary; Auxiliary; National Highways; Transport in China
← G80	→ G8012

The G8011 Kaiyuan–Hekou Expressway (Chinese: 开远—河口高速公路), commonly referred to as the Kaihe Expressway (Chinese: 开河高速公路), is an expressway in China that connects Kaiyuan, Honghe Hani and Yi Autonomous Prefecture, Yunnan, and Hekou Yao Autonomous County, Honghe Hani and Yi Autonomous Prefecture, Yunnan. It is a spur of G80 Guangzhou–Kunming Expressway located entirely in Yunnan Province and was fully completed by 2018.

Hekou, the southern terminus of the expressway, is located on the China–Vietnam border and there is a border crossing available to Lào Cai, Vietnam, where the CT05 Hanoi–Lao Cai Expressway starts.
