= Pseudochactas =

Scientific classification
- Kingdom: Animalia
- Phylum: Arthropoda
- Subphylum: Chelicerata
- Class: Arachnida
- Order: Scorpiones
- Family: Pseudochactidae
- Genus: Pseudochactas; Gromov, 1998

Species
- Pseudochactas ovchinnikovi; Pseudochactas mischi

Genus of scorpions

Pseudochactas is a genus of scorpions within the family Pseudochactidae, first described by Alexander V. Gromov in 1998. This genus is notable for its distinctive morphological features and its status as a "living fossil" due to its unique evolutionary lineage.

== Taxonomy and species ==
The genus Pseudochactas comprises two recognized species:

- Pseudochactas ovchinnikovi – Described by Gromov in 1998, this species was the first identified member of the genus.
- Pseudochactas mischi – Described in 2012 from south-central Afghanistan, expanding the known range of the genus.

== Morphological characteristics ==
Pseudochactas scorpions exhibit several unique morphological traits that distinguish them from other scorpion genera. Notably, they possess a distinctive trichobothrial pattern on their pedipalps, which does not conform to the fundamental patterns observed in other scorpions. Additionally, they display a combination of characteristics shared with both buthid and non-buthid scorpion families, contributing to debates regarding their phylogenetic position.

== Distribution and habitat ==
Species of Pseudochactas are found in Central Asia, specifically in southeastern Uzbekistan, southwestern Tajikistan, and south-central Afghanistan. They inhabit isolated mountainous regions, often residing under stones or within mud cracks along riverbanks in semi-arid environments.
