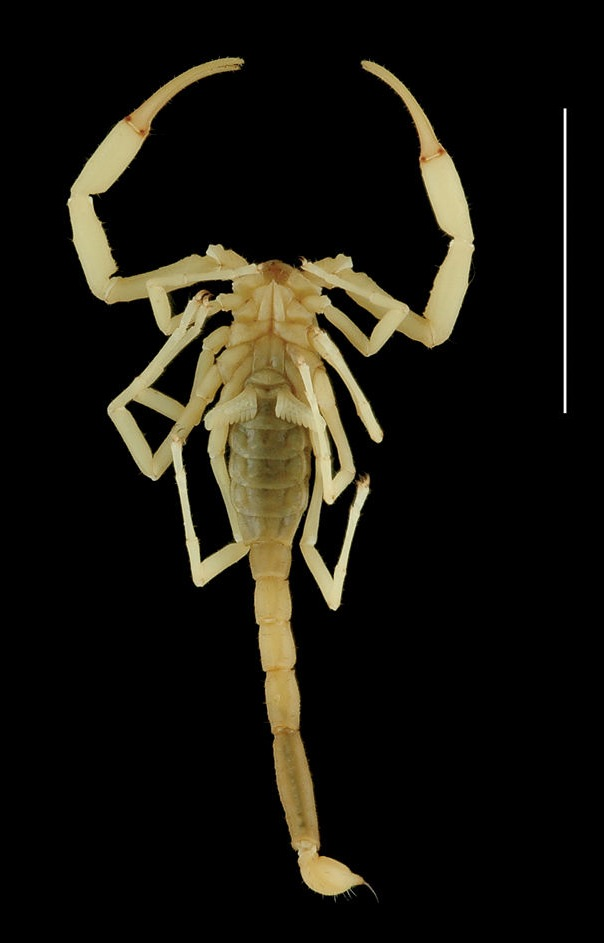
- Vietbocap canhi

Scientific classification
- Domain: Eukaryota
- Kingdom: Animalia
- Phylum: Arthropoda
- Subphylum: Chelicerata
- Class: Arachnida
- Order: Scorpiones
- Family: Pseudochactidae
- Genus: Vietbocap; Lourenço & Pham, 2010

Type species
- Vietbocap canhi Lourenco & Pham, 2010

Species
- Vietbocap aurantiacus Lourenco, Pham, Tran & Tran, 2018; Vietbocap canhi Lourenco & Pham, 2010; Vietbocap lao Lourenco, 2012; Vietbocap quinquemilia Lourenco, Pham, Tran & Tran, 2018; Vietbocap thienduongensis Lourenco & Pham, 2012

= Vietbocap =

Genus of scorpions

Vietbocap is a genus of troglobiontic scorpions in the family Pseudochactidae native to South-East Asia.
