= Trấn Yên, Lào Cai =

Trấn Yên
- Commune
- Location within Vietnam
- Coordinates: 21°45′50″N 104°49′14″E
- Country: Vietnam
- Region: Northeast
- Province: Lào Cai

Area
  - Total: 1.68 sq mi (4.36 km^{2})

Population (2003)
  - Total: 5,525
- Time zone: UTC+7 (UTC + 7)

Trấn Yên is a commune of Lào Cai Province, in the northeastern region of Vietnam.

On June 16, 2025, the Standing Committee of the National Assembly issued Resolution No. 1680/NQ-UBTVQH15 on the reorganization of commune-level administrative units in Lào Cai Province in 2025. Accordingly, Cổ Phúc Township, together with Báo Đáp Commune, Tân Đồng Commune, Thành Thịnh Commune, Hòa Cuông Commune, and Minh Quán Commune, were merged to form a new commune named Trấn Yên Commune.
