= AH14 =

Road in Asia

Asian Highway 14
- Map of AH14 in red

Route information
- Length: 2,004 km (1,245 mi)

Major junctions
- North end: Hai Phong, Vietnam
- South end: Mandalay, Myanmar

Location
- Countries: Vietnam; China; Myanmar

Highway system
- Asian Highway Network
← AH13	→ AH15

Asian Highway 14 (AH14) is a road in the Asian Highway Network running 2,004 kilometres (1,245 mi) from Hai Phong, Vietnam to Mandalay, Myanmar connecting AH1 in Hanoi, Vietnam, to AH3 in Kunming, Yunnan, China and eventually to AH2. The route is as follows:

== Vietnam ==
- Hanoi–Haiphong Expressway: Hai Phong – Hanoi
- Ringway 3 (Hanoi): Hanoi
- Hanoi–Lao Cai Expressway: Hanoi - Lào Cai

== China ==
- G8011: Hekou - Kaiyuan
- G80: Kaiyuan - Kunming
- G56: Kunming - Zhen'an - Mangshi - Ruili

== Myanmar ==
- National Highway 3: Muse - Lashio - Mandalay ( AH2)

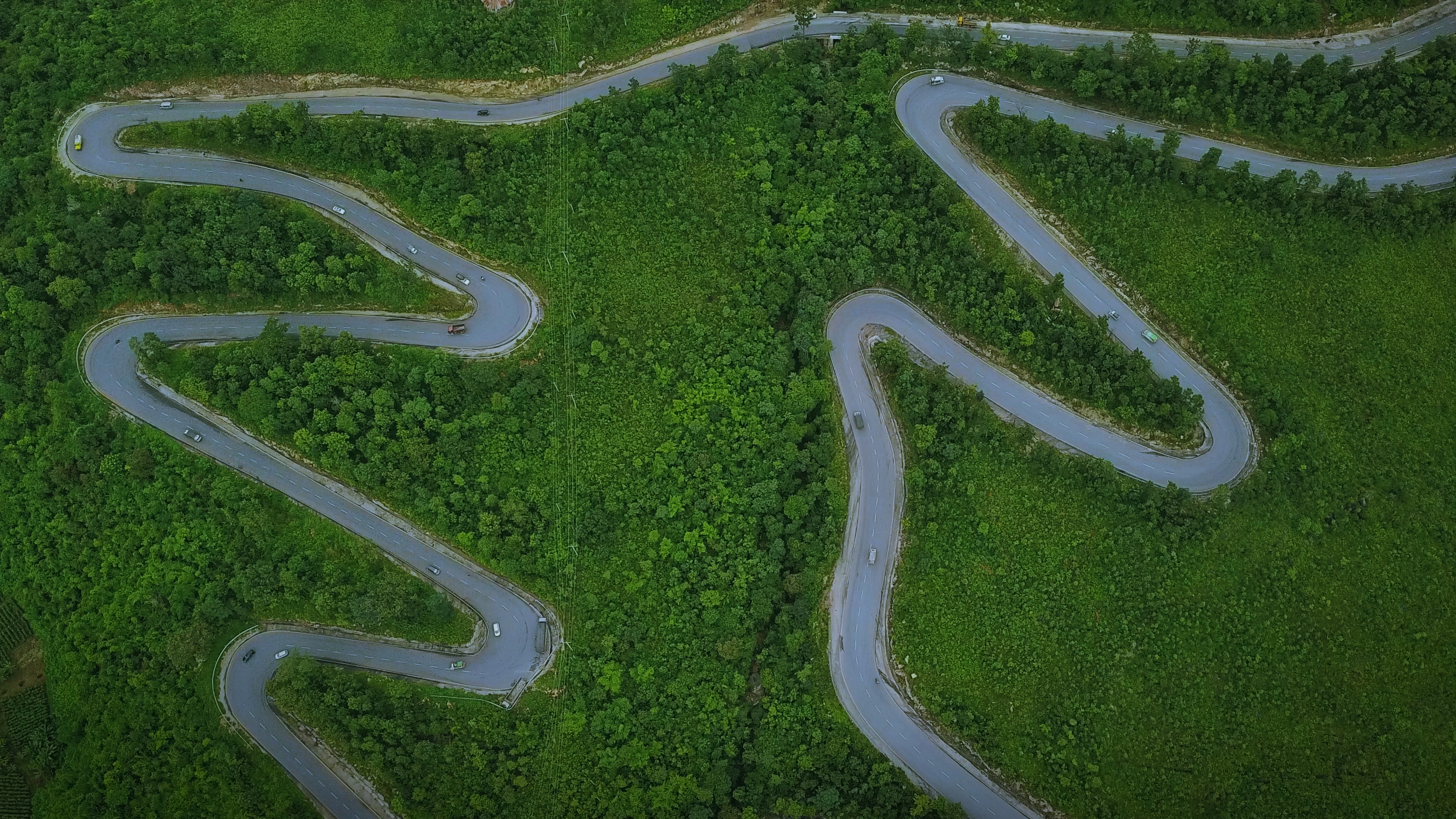
NH3 between Mandalay and Pyinoolwin
