= Cẩm Khê =

Cẩm Khê Xã Cẩm Khê
- Commune
- Location in Vietnam
- Coordinates: 21°25′19″N 105°08′00″E
- Country: Vietnam
- Region: Northeast
- Province: Phú Thọ
- Time zone: UTC+7 (UTC+7)

Cẩm Khê is a commune (xã) of Phú Thọ Province, Vietnam.
