= Phù Ninh district =

Phù Ninh district Huyện Phù Ninh
- District
- Interactive map of Phù Ninh district
- Country: Vietnam
- Region: Northeast
- Province: Phú Thọ
- Capital: Phong Châu

Area
  - Total: 64 sq mi (167 km^{2})

Population (2003)
  - Total: 114,048
- Time zone: UTC+7 (Indochina Time)

Phù Ninh is a former rural district of Phú Thọ province in the northeastern region of Vietnam. As of 2003 the district had a population of 114,048. The district covers an area of 167 km^{2}. The district capital lies at Phong Châu.

== Administrative divisions ==
The district consists of the district capital, Phong Châu, and 18 communes: Trạm Thản, Tiên Phú, Liên Hoa, Vĩnh Phú, Trung Giáp, Bảo Thanh, Trị Quận, Hạ Giáp, Gia Thanh, Phú Nham, Phú Lộc, Tiên Du, Phù Ninh, An Đạo, Tử Đà, Bình Bộ, Phú Mỹ and Lệ Mỹ.
