= Văn Bàn district =

Coordinates: 22.083°N 104.250°E

Văn Bàn District Huyện Văn Bàn
- District
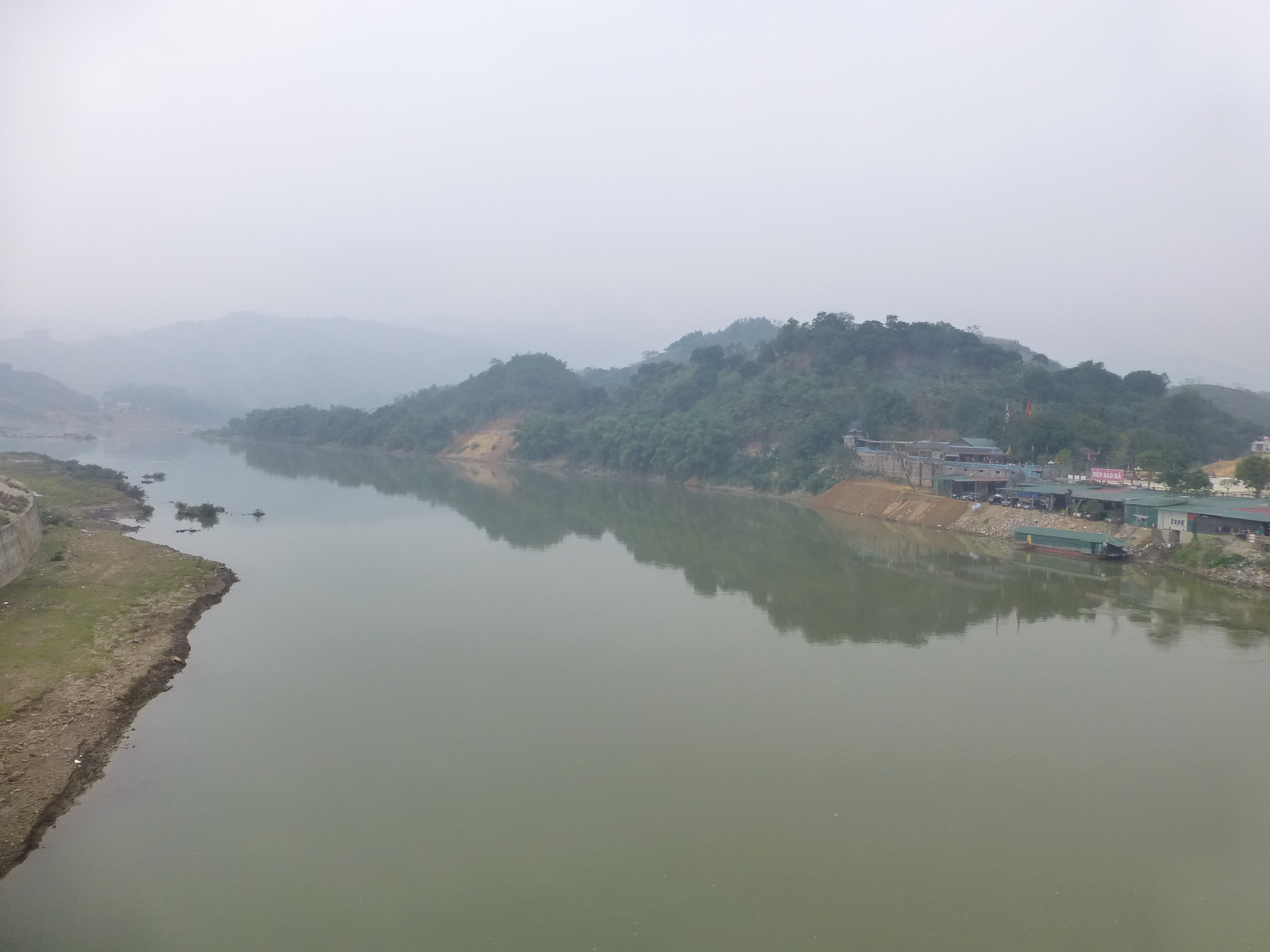
- The bank of the Red River in Tân An Rural Commune, Văn Bàn District

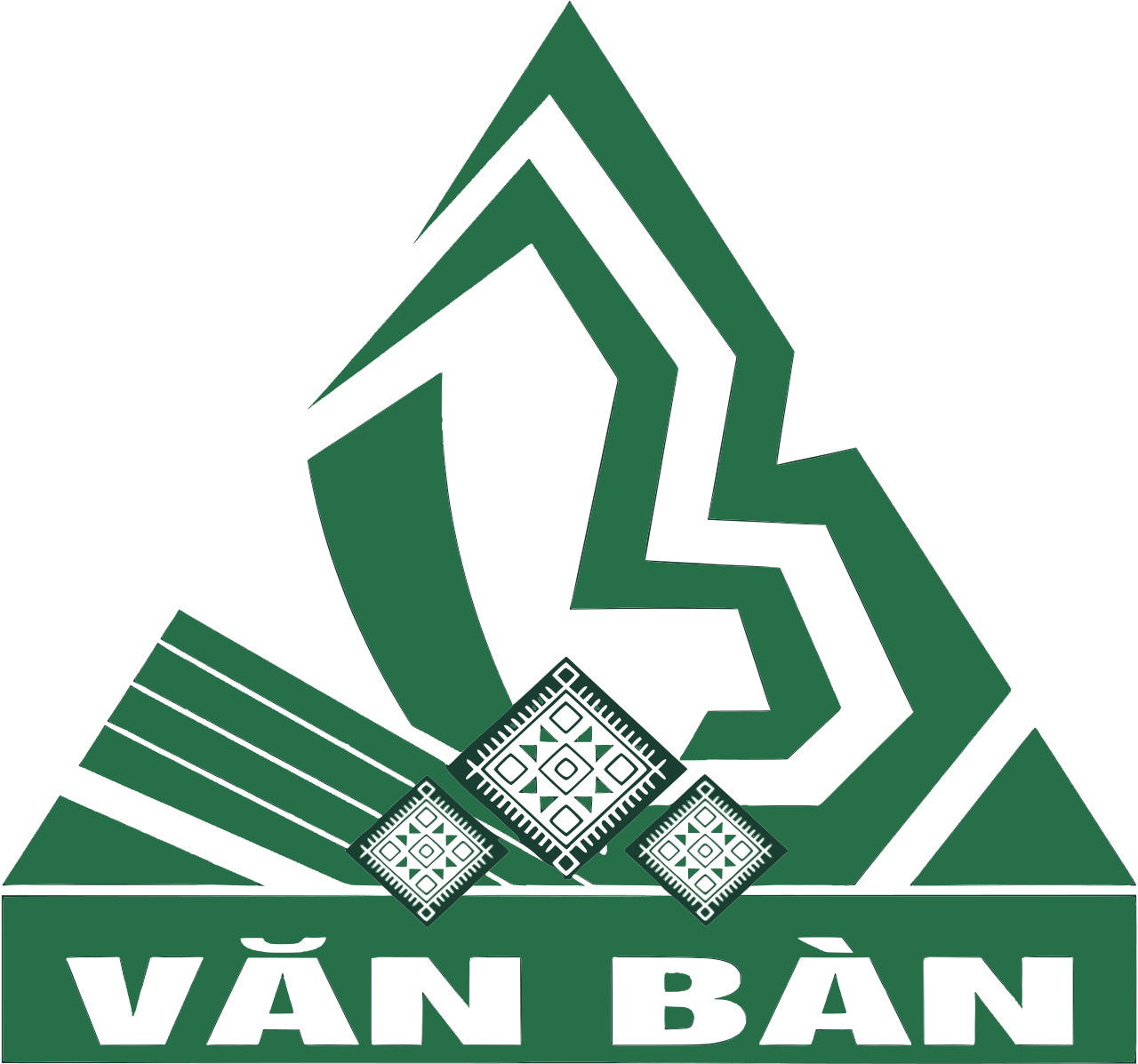
- Seal
- Interactive map of Văn Bàn District
- Country: Vietnam
- Region: Northeast
- Province: Lào Cai
- Capital: Khánh Yên

Area
  - Total: 1,444 km^{2} (558 sq mi)

Population (2019)
  - Total: 89,167
  - Density: 61.75/km^{2} (159.9/sq mi)
- Time zone: UTC+7 (Indochina Time)

Văn Bàn is a former rural district of Lào Cai province in the Northeastern region of Vietnam. As of 2019, the district had a population of 89,167. The district covers an area of 1,444 km^{2}. The district capital lies at Khánh Yên.

The district is located in the southern part of the province, on the right bank of the Red River.

== Administrative divisions ==
Văn Bàn is officially divided into 22 commune-level sub-divisions, including the township of Khánh Yên and 21 rural communes (Chiềng Ken, Dần Thàng, Dương Quỳ, Hòa Mạc, Khánh Yên Hạ, Khánh Yên Thượng, Khánh Yên Trung, Làng Giàng, Liêm Phú, Minh Lương, Nậm Chày, Nậm Mả, Nậm Dạng, Nậm Tha, Nậm Xây, Nậm Xé, Sơn Thủy, Tân An, Tân Thượng, Thẩm Dương, Võ Lao).
