= Đoan Hùng =

- Commune
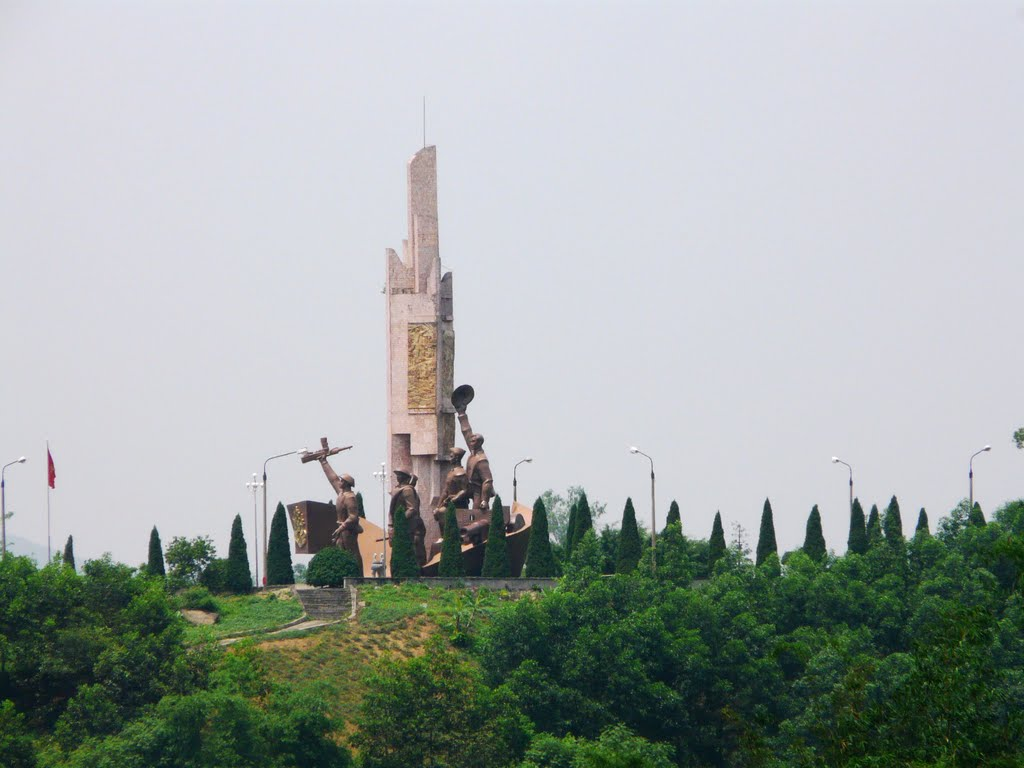
- Sông Lô Victory Monument in Đoan Hùng Commune
- Interactive map of Đoan Hùng
- Coordinates: 21°37′51″N 105°10′44″E
- Country: Vietnam
- Region: Northeast
- Province: Phú Thọ
- Established: 16 June 2025
- Administrative headquarters: 592 Đồng Tâm Street

Area
  - Total: 44.80 km^{2} (17.30 sq mi)

Population (2025)
  - Total: 30,509
  - Density: 681/km^{2} (1,760/sq mi)
- Website: doanhung.phutho.gov.vn

Đoan Hùng is a commune in Phú Thọ province, Vietnam.

On 16 June 2025, the National Assembly of Vietnam adopted Resolution No. 203/2025/QH15 amending and supplementing several articles of the Constitution of Vietnam, which provided for the termination of district-level administrative units nationwide from 1 July 2025.

On the same date, the Standing Committee of the National Assembly of Vietnam issued Resolution No. 1676/NQ-UBTVQH15 on the arrangement of commune-level administrative units in Phú Thọ province in 2025. Under the resolution, the entire area and population of Đoan Hùng township, Ngọc Quan commune, and Hợp Nhất commune, formerly part of Đoan Hùng district, were merged to form a new commune named Đoan Hùng.
