= Thanh Ba =

Thanh Ba Thị trấn Thanh Ba
- Commune
- Location in Vietnam
- Coordinates: 21°29′56″N 105°08′05″E
- Country: Vietnam
- Region: Northeast
- Province: Phú Thọ
- Time zone: UTC+7 (UTC+7)

Thanh Ba is a commune (xã) of Phú Thọ Province, Vietnam.
