= Lương Thịnh =

- Commune
- Lương Thịnh commune
- Location of in Vietnam
- Coordinates: 21°35′46″N 104°47′10″E
- Country: Vietnam
- Province: Lào Cai province

Area
  - Total: 94.21 km^{2} (36.37 sq mi)

Population (2024)
  - Total: 12,692
  - Density: 134.7/km^{2} (348.9/sq mi)
- Climate: Aw

Lương Thịnh (Vietnamese: Xã Lương Thịnh) is a commune of Lào Cai province, Vietnam. It is one of the 99 new wards, communes and special zones of the province following the reorganization in 2025.
