= G80 Guangzhou–Kunming Expressway =

Expressway in Southern China, that connects Foshan, Guangdong and Kunming, Yunnan

Guangzhou–Kunming Expressway
- 广州－昆明高速公路
- Guangkun Expressway 广昆高速公路

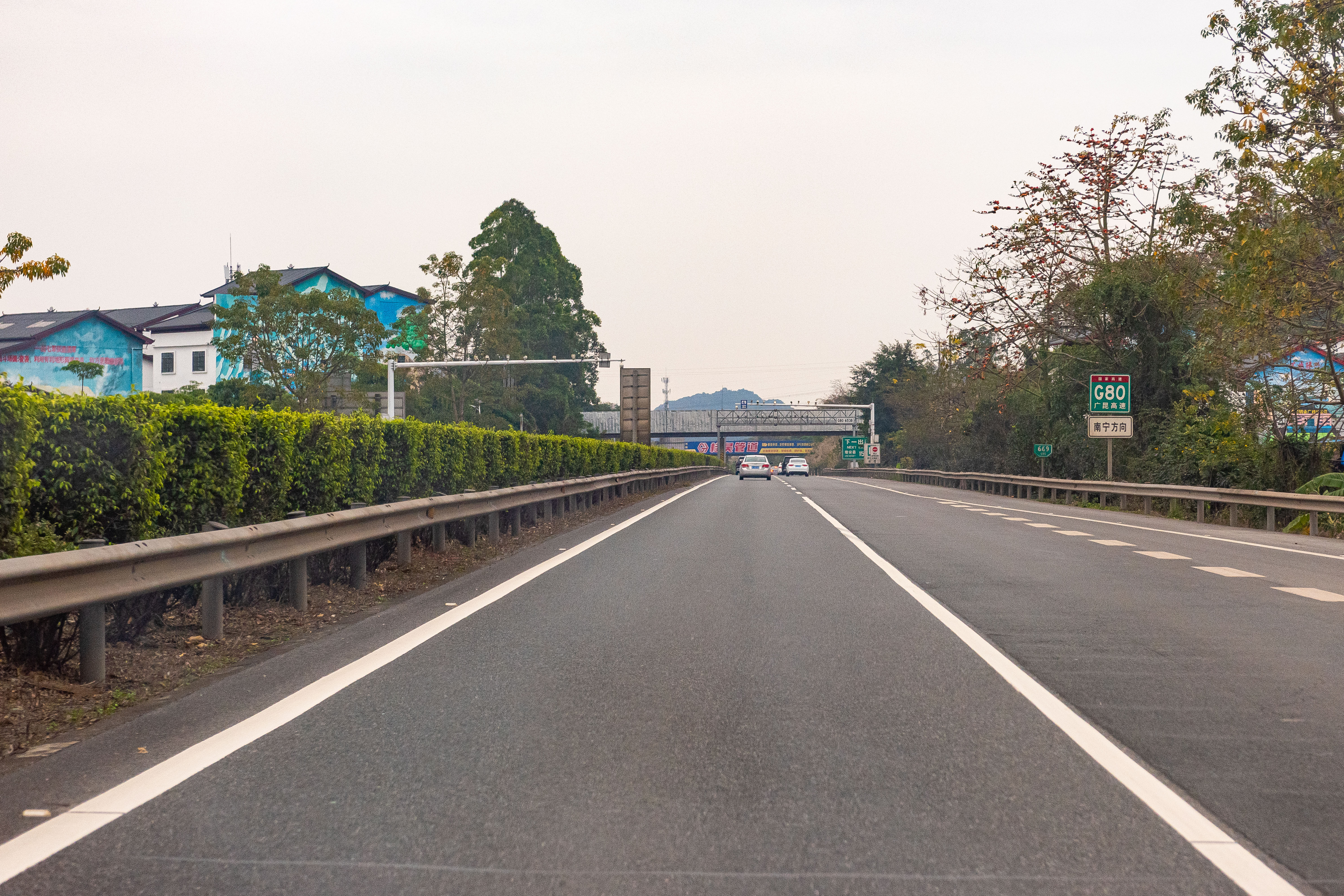
- G80 in Guangxi

Route information
- Part of AH1 AH14
- Length: 1,511 km (939 mi) Length when complete.

Major junctions
- East end: G1508 Guangzhou Ring Expressway, Guangzhou, Guangdong
- West end: Shihuguan Interchange, 2nd Ring Road, Kunming, Yunnan

Location
- Country: China

Highway system
- National Trunk Highway System; Primary; Auxiliary; National Highways; Transport in China
← G78	→ G8011

The Guangzhou–Kunming Expressway (Chinese: 广州—昆明高速公路), designated as G80 and commonly referred to as the Guangkun Expressway (Chinese: 广昆高速公路) is an expressway in China that connects the cities of Guangzhou, Guangdong, and Kunming, Yunnan. When complete, it will be 1,511 km (939 mi) in length.

The section of roadway from Suolongshi, Mile County, Honghe Hani and Yi Autonomous Prefecture, Yunnan to Shilin Yi Autonomous County still follows China National Highway 326 which is not a grade-separated expressway. It is currently being upgraded to expressway standards.
