= Tuyên Quang (city) =

- Provincial city (Class-3)
- Tuyên Quang City; Thành phố Tuyên Quang
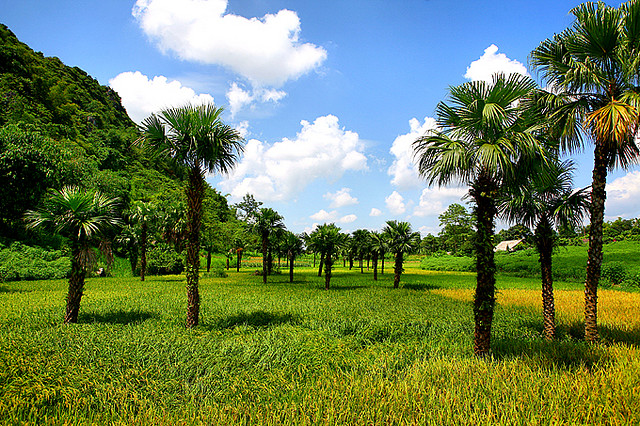

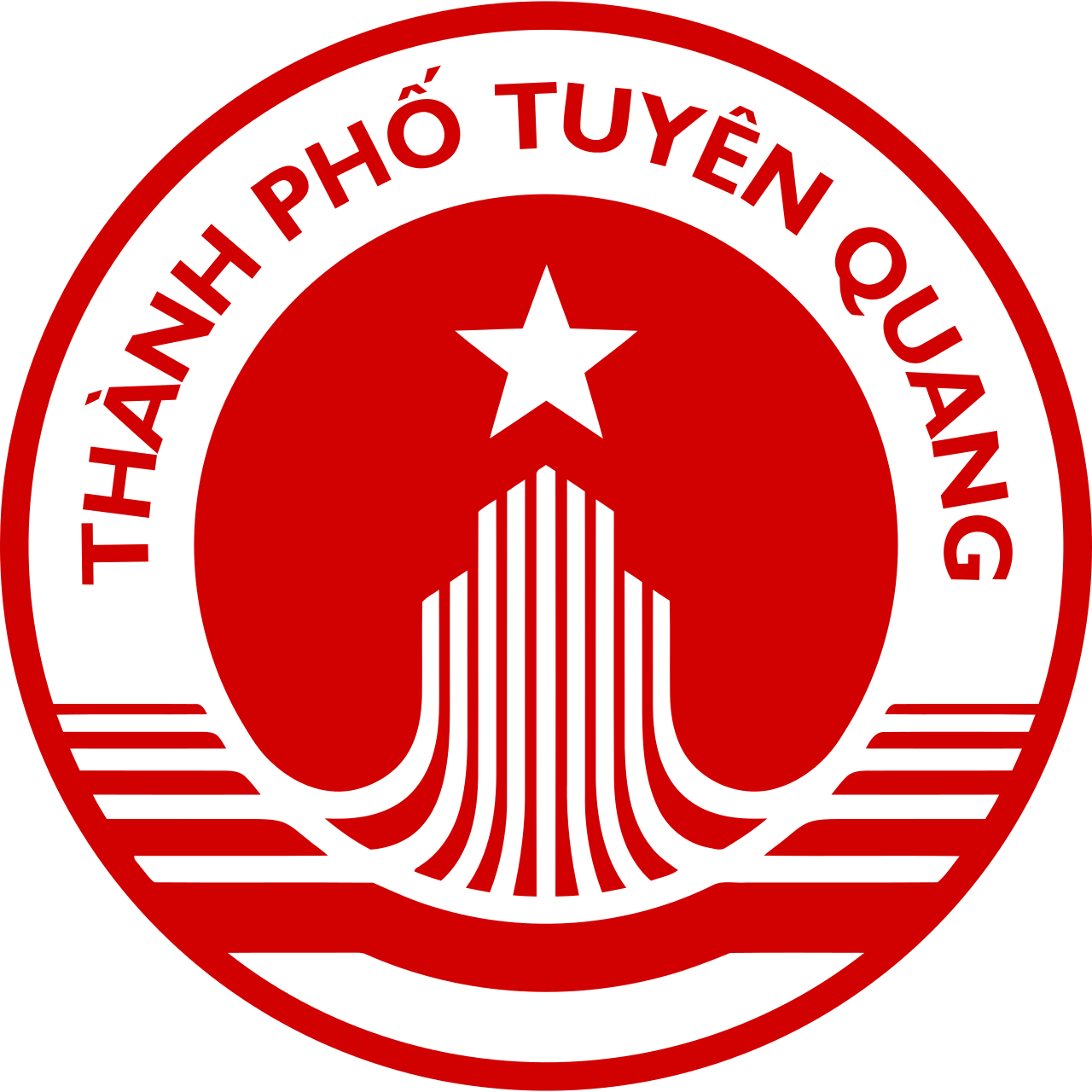
- Seal

- Location of in Vietnam
- Coordinates: 21°49′N 105°13′E
- Country: Vietnam
- Province: Tuyên Quang

Area
  - Provincial city (Class-3): 119 km^{2} (46 sq mi)

Population 2019 census
  - Provincial city (Class-3): 104,645
  - Density: 879/km^{2} (2,280/sq mi)
  - Urban: 62,375
- Climate: Cwa

Tuyên Quang is a former city in Vietnam, and is the capital of Tuyên Quang Province.

== History ==
The French post at Tuyên Quang was defended for four months against 12,000 troops of the Yunnan Army and the Black Flag Army by two companies of the French Foreign Legion during the Sino-French War (August 1884 to April 1885). The Siege of Tuyên Quang is still remembered as one of the Legion's most celebrated feats of arms, and is commemorated in the first verse of "Le Boudin", its principal marching song.

During the French protectorate, Tuyên Quang served as a garrison. During the Democratic Republic of Vietnam, the Viet Minh made the Legionnaires surrender at the memorial to the Battle of Tuyên Quang in the First Indochina War (1946–54).

== Administrative divisions ==
Phuong: Hưng Thành, Nông Tiến, Ỷ La, Minh Xuân, Phan Thiết, Tân Quang, Tân Hà, An Tường. Communes: Tràng Đà, Lưỡng Vượng, An Khang, Thái Long, Đội Cấn.

== Climate ==
Climate data for Tuyên Quang
Month	Jan	Feb	Mar	Apr	May	Jun	Jul	Aug	Sep	Oct	Nov	Dec	Year
Record high °C (°F)	32.0 (89.6)	34.5 (94.1)	37.1 (98.8)	39.4 (102.9)	41.0 (105.8)	40.5 (104.9)	38.5 (101.3)	38.5 (101.3)	37.6 (99.7)	35.2 (95.4)	34.3 (93.7)	32.6 (90.7)	41.0 (105.8)
Mean daily maximum °C (°F)	19.7 (67.5)	20.9 (69.6)	23.8 (74.8)	28.1 (82.6)	31.9 (89.4)	33.1 (91.6)	33.1 (91.6)	32.7 (90.9)	31.8 (89.2)	29.2 (84.6)	25.7 (78.3)	22.0 (71.6)	27.7 (81.9)
Daily mean °C (°F)	16.1 (61.0)	17.6 (63.7)	20.5 (68.9)	24.3 (75.7)	27.4 (81.3)	28.7 (83.7)	28.6 (83.5)	28.1 (82.6)	27.1 (80.8)	24.6 (76.3)	21.0 (69.8)	17.5 (63.5)	23.5 (74.3)
Mean daily minimum °C (°F)	13.8 (56.8)	15.5 (59.9)	18.3 (64.9)	21.7 (71.1)	24.1 (75.4)	25.4 (77.7)	25.6 (78.1)	25.1 (77.2)	24.1 (75.4)	21.7 (71.1)	18.0 (64.4)	14.6 (58.3)	20.7 (69.3)
Record low °C (°F)	2.4 (36.3)	5.2 (41.4)	7.1 (44.8)	12.2 (54.0)	16.5 (61.7)	18.8 (65.8)	20.2 (68.4)	19.9 (67.8)	16.9 (62.4)	10.5 (50.9)	7.1 (44.8)	2.9 (37.2)	2.4 (36.3)
Average rainfall mm (inches)	27.3 (1.07)	27.7 (1.09)	52.5 (2.07)	115.9 (4.56)	221.9 (8.74)	259.7 (10.22)	291.5 (11.48)	298.6 (11.76)	177.4 (6.98)	119.2 (4.69)	53.1 (2.09)	20.3 (0.80)	1,662.9 (65.47)
Average rainy days	10.6	11.2	14.9	14.6	15.0	15.9	17.8	18.0	12.8	10.5	7.5	6.8	155.5
Average relative humidity (%)	82.4	82.6	83.5	83.0	80.5	81.8	83.0	84.9	83.7	82.5	81.7	80.6	82.5
Mean monthly sunshine hours	62.6	49.9	52.7	96.7	171.5	164.8	181.6	180.1	178.1	153.6	129.1	105.2	1,521.3
Source: Vietnam Institute for Building Science and Technology, Nchmf.gov.vn (August record high)
