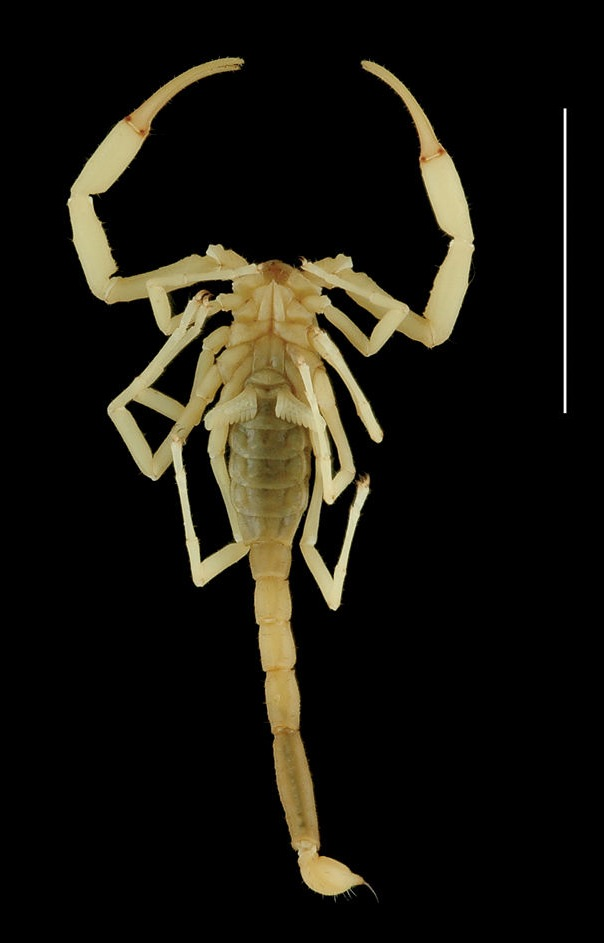
- Vietbocap canhi. Scale bar is 10 mm.

Scientific classification
- Kingdom: Animalia
- Phylum: Arthropoda
- Subphylum: Chelicerata
- Class: Arachnida
- Order: Scorpiones
- Parvorder: Pseudochactida; Soleglad and Fet, 2003
- Superfamily: Pseudochactoidea; Gromov, 1998
- Family: Pseudochactidae; Gromov, 1998

Subfamilies
- Pseudochactinae; Vietbocapinae

= Pseudochactidae =

Family of scorpions

The Pseudochactidae are a scorpion family. They are predominantly found in caves.

== Genera ==
- Aemngvantom Prendini & Ehrenthal & Loria, 2021
- Pseudochactas Gromov, 1998
- Qianxie Tang, 2022
- Troglokhammouanus Lourenço, 2007
- Vietbocap Lourenço & Pham, 2010
