= Ho Chi Minh Highway =

Road in Vietnam

Ho Chi Minh Highway

Route information
- Length: 3,167 km (1,968 mi)
- Existed: 1959–present
- Component highways: TL 203 QL 2 QL 2C CT.02 QL 3 QL 12B QL 21A QL 15 QL 14 QL 14B QL 14E CT.17 CT.01 QL N2 QL 61 QL 63 QL 1

Major junctions
- North end: Pac Bo, Cao Bằng province
- South end: Mũi Cà Mau, Cà Mau province

Ho Chi Minh Road or Ho Chi Minh Highway (Vietnamese: Đường Hồ Chí Minh) is a highway in Vietnam. It runs from the north to the south of Vietnam, west of National Route 1. The highway was named after Hồ Chí Minh.

== History ==
The route roughly coincides with the Ho Chi Minh trail during the Vietnam War. It is a two-lane highway and is planned to become an 8-lane highway and it will connect Cao Bằng province by the Sino-Vietnamese border to Cà Mau province with the total length of 2,436 km. As of 2007, this road runs from Hoa Lac in Hanoi to Ngoc Hoi in Kon Tum province with a total length of 1,234.5 km.

== Route ==
In Village number 5, Xuân Trạch commune, Bố Trạch district, Quảng Bình province, the road divides (QL15-QL16 intersection) into two separate roads: Đường Hồ Chí Minh Đông (Ho Chi Minh Highway East) and Đường Hồ Chí Minh Tây (Ho Chi Minh Highway West). Đường Hồ Chí Minh Đông is a well-traveled road with many trucks, towns and restaurants along it. There are few steep hills on the Đường Hồ Chí Minh Đông, with the exception of the portion of the highway in Quảng Nam just before it merges with Đường Hồ Chí Minh Tây. Conversely, Đường Hồ Chí Minh Tây cuts through extremely mountainous areas with steep hills and few gas stations. Consequently, all heavy traffic avoids these portion of Đường Hồ Chí Minh Tây. At times, heavy rain washes out small segments of Đường Hồ Chí Minh Tây, making it impassable to trucks and cars. Motorists must be alert to domestic goats, buffalo and cows grazing along the roadside. The roads reconnect at the intersection with National road and Asian highway QL9/AH16 and QL14 in Đa Krông district, Quảng Trị province.

When the highway was first built, a small portion of Đường Hồ Chí Minh Tây within Thừa Thiên Huế and Quảng Nam passed through Laos, but the highway now stays completely within Vietnam's borders.

== Future ==
A new expressway (CT.02) is planned on roughly the same route as the Ho Chi Minh Highway, connecting Hanoi and Ho Chi Minh City along the west of Vietnam.

== See also ==
- Fall of Saigon
- Ho Chi Minh trail
- Ho Chi Minh
- North Vietnam
- South Vietnam
- Vietnam War
- Vietnam
