= North–South Expressway East =

Road in Vietnam

CT.01 Expressway
- North-South Expressway East
- Đường cao tốc Bắc–Nam phía Đông
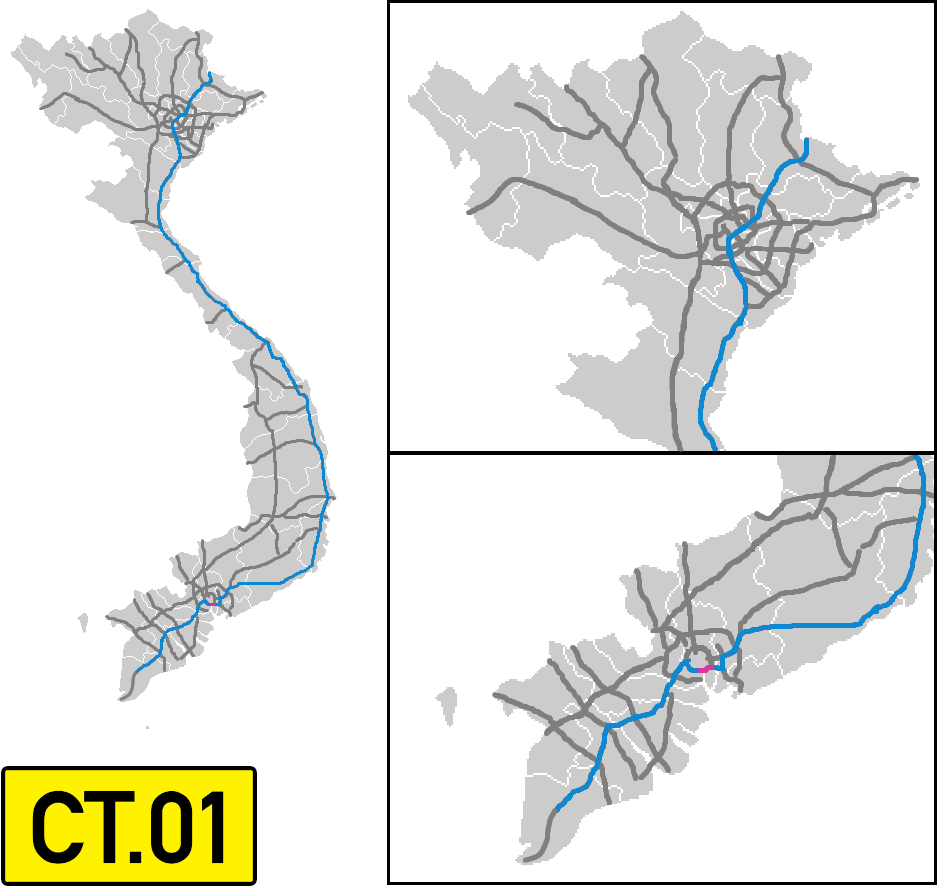
- Map of the CT.01 expressway with operational (blue) and under construction (pink) sections

Route information
- Part of AH1 (Ringway 3 (Hanoi)) (Nghệ An - Đà Nẵng) (Lộ 25 - Long Thành) (Ringway 3 (HCMC)) (An Hữu - Châu Thành) (Long Thành - Tân Hiệp)
- Maintained by Vietnam Expressway Corp (VEC), Đèo Cả Group, Sơn Hải Group
- Length: 2,063 km (1,282 mi)
- Status: Under construction
- Existed: 1/1/2002 (24 years, 7 months, 2 weeks and 3 days); 3/2/2010 Expressway (16 years, 6 months, 2 weeks and 1 day)–present
- History: Expected completion in 2025-26

Major junctions
- North end: G7211 in Lạng Sơn
- South end: Ca Mau Ring Road, Cà Mau

Location
- Country: Vietnam
- Provinces: LS, BN, NB, TH, NA, HT, QT, HUE, ĐN, QN, GL, ĐL, KH, LĐ, ĐN, HCMC, TN, ĐT, VL, CT, AG, CM
- Municipalities: Hanoi, Đà Nẵng, Hồ Chí Minh City, Cần Thơ

Highway system
- Transport in Vietnam
→ CT.02

The North–South Expressway East (Vietnamese: Đường cao tốc Bắc–Nam phía Đông) is an expressway in Vietnam located very close to National Route 1, acting as an artery traversing the entirety of Vietnam from North to South. Similar to National Route 1, the expressway starts from Lạng Sơn and ends at Cà Mau. At the northern border, the expressway will connect to Nanning-Youyiguan Expressway in China.

The project has a total length of 2,063 kilometres (1,282 mi), starting at Huu Nghi border gate (Lạng Sơn) and terminating at the ring road of Cà Mau city. The control points of the expressway are located in the Eastern Transport Corridor, running almost parallel to the upgraded and expanded National Highway 1. The North-South Expressway is being built with 18 sections acting as nodes: Lạng Sơn, Hà Nội, Ninh Bình, Thanh Hóa, Hà Tĩnh, Quảng Trị, Đà Nẵng, Quảng Ngãi, Bình Định, Nha Trang, Phan Thiết, Dầu Giây, Long Thành, Bến Lức, HCMC - Trung Luong, My Thuan, Cần Thơ and Cà Mau, with a total cost estimate of VND 350 trillion (equivalent to US$18.5 billion).

== History ==
=== Background and current situation ===
The transport corridor on the north–south axis from Lạng Sơn to Cà Mau plays a very important role: connecting the political capital of Hanoi with the economic center of Ho Chi Minh City, passing through 32 provinces and cities accounting for 62.1% of the population, contributing 65.7% of the gross domestic product, affecting 74% of seaports (classes I, II), 75% of economic regions of the country and especially connecting 4 key economic regions (North, Central, South and Mekong Delta), connecting 16 out of 23 airports (91% of passenger traffic). This is the most important transport corridor in the transport infrastructure system of Vietnam.

In 2019, the Ministry of Transport decided to exclude foreign investors from bidding on the North-South Expressway, mainly to prevent Chinese companies from participating. Public backlash was feared if Chinese companies would collect toll fees, due to strong anti-Chinese sentiment in the country, and national security concerns played a part as well. However, lack of bidders has led to low competition between the bids, and two out of five sections had not attracted any bids.

According to 2017 estimates, yearly total transport volume over Vietnam's north-south corridor would be 45.37 million passengers and 62.27 million tons of goods by 2020, which would exceed the capacity of current infrastructure by 10% to 25%. Four goals of the project have been formulated by the Ministry of Transport:

- Allow the economy to be more competitive within ASEAN and the WTO.
- Improve transportation capacity and speed along the North-South transport corridor.
- Promoto socio-economic development and ensure national security.
- Connect the capital and political centre Hanoi and the economic centre Ho Chi Minh City with the 4 key economic zones,^{[A]} urban areas, key industrial zones, border gates and international seaports.

^{A} North, Central and Southern Vietnam, and Mekong Delta

From 2004 to 2021, Vietnam only has about 1,163 kilometres (723 mi) of expressways put into operation, equal to 18% of the plan, the average construction speed is 74 km/year, only 1.5% of the development speed of expressways in China during the same period; has not yet fulfilled the goal of "completing and putting into use about 2,000 km of expressways by 2020" according to Resolution 13-NQ/TW.. of the 11th Central Committee of the Communist Party of Vietnam (just reached 48%). The implementation of investment in expressways has not been rational, and has not been distributed harmoniously among key economic regions, dynamic regions and disadvantaged areas.

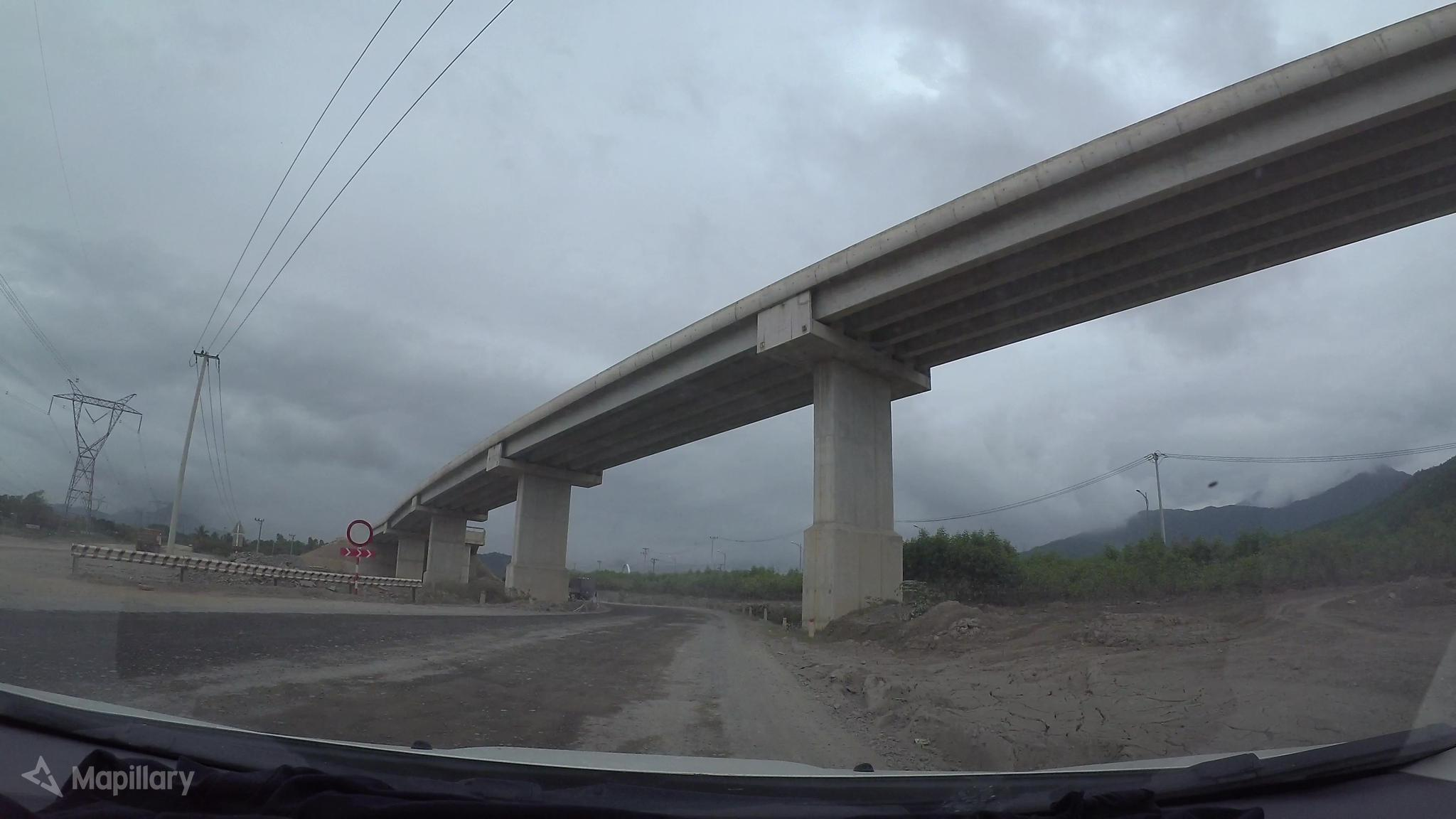
La Son–Tuy Loan Expressway construction near Da Nang

=== History ===
The idea of building the North-South Expressway appeared before 2010, when the demand for road travel between provinces along the north-south axis increased rapidly, while the existing National Route 1 was overloaded. although it has been widened at least four lanes, and at the same time build a new route avoiding urban areas. However, the expansion capacity of National Route 1 becomes limited because people live on both sides of the road, so the cost of clearing is very large. In addition, National Route 1 almost all sections run along the same corridor with North–South Railway, the possibility of expansion is not feasible. The construction of the North-South Expressway as well as other expressway systems in Vietnam aims to separate passenger cars, non-stop passenger cars and long-distance trucks from the traffic of rudimentary vehicles and two- to three-wheelers, passenger cars, passenger cars often pick up and drop off passengers along the road and trucks, creating conditions for long-distance vehicles to run faster and safer.

The predecessors of the North-South Expressways are the Phap Van–Cau Gie bypass completed in 1998, along with the NH1 bypass, the Phap Van–Bac Giang section. At that time, these roads were only bypasses of National Highway 1 and did not meet expressway standards. In 2012, the East North-South Expressway running through the two areas above was built on the basis of upgrading the existing bypass, building overpasses at sections through Phap Van urban area and parallel roads for two-wheelers.

The first expressway completed in the North-South Expressway system is Phap Van–Cau Gie Expressway, which opened to traffic in 2002.

According to the original plan, the North-South Expressway is 1,811 kilometres (1,125 mi) long to the east, starting point from Phap Van (Hanoi), ending point is Can Tho city. However, the system planning for the 2021-2030 period has been adjusted. According to which, the North-South Expressway is 2,063 kilometres (1,282 mi) long, the starting point is from Huu Nghi border gate (Lang Son) and the end point is Ca Mau City. Accordingly, two expressways Hanoi–Lang Son (old CT.03) and Can Tho–Ca Mau expressway (old CT.19) are combined into the North–South Expressway planning.

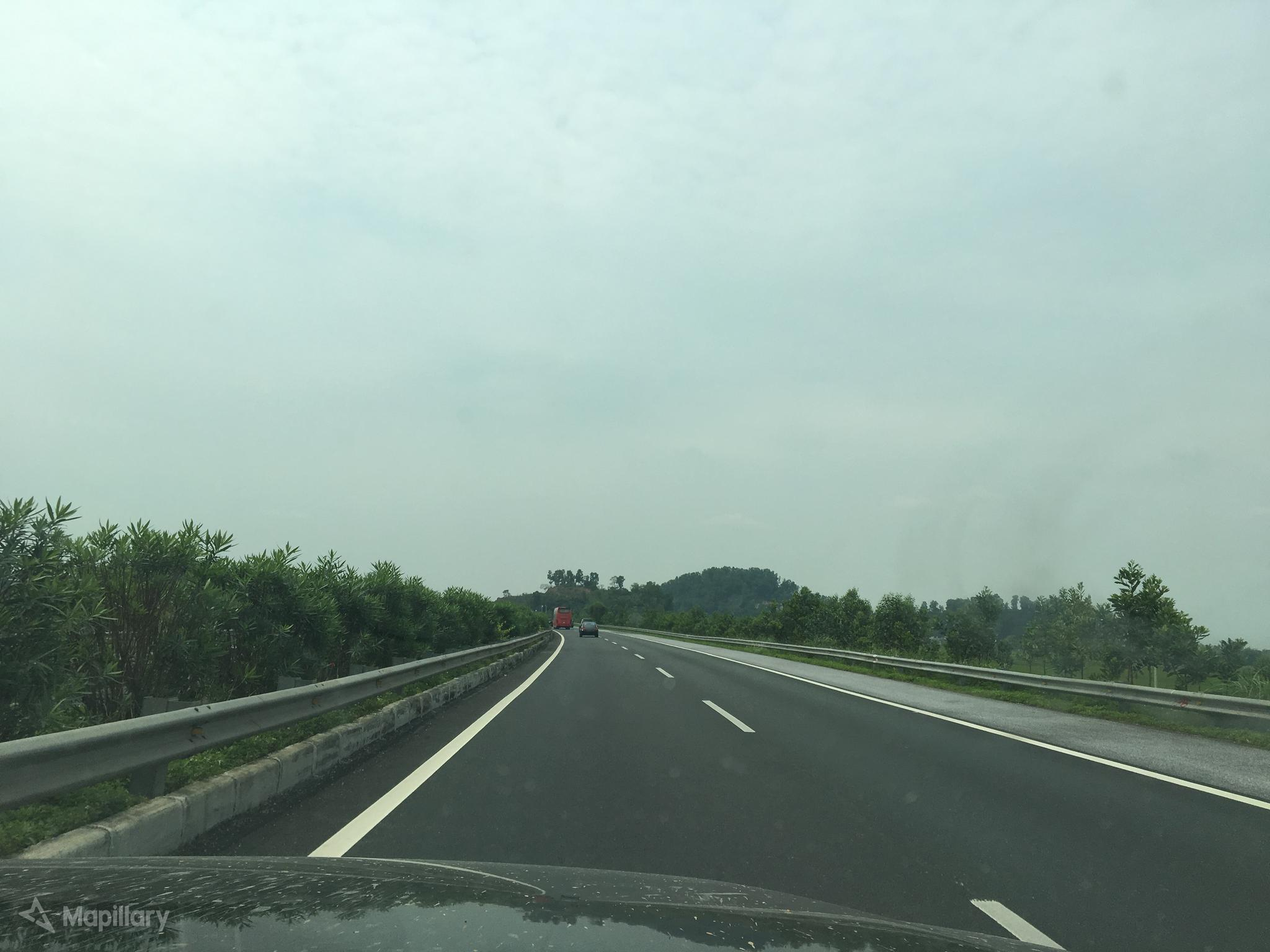
Cau Gie–Ninh Binh Expressway near Phủ Lý

== Expressway planning ==
=== 2010 ===
The detailed planning of the entire North-South expressway east of CT.01 was announced by the Prime Minister in January 2010. There are 16 main sections of the route from north to south. The total length of the route from Hanoi to Can Tho is 1811 km.

Number	Expressway section name	Start	End	Length	Number	Expressway section name	Start	End	Length
1	Phap Van - Cau Gie	Phap Van	Cau Gie	30 km	9	Quang Ngai - Binh Dinh	Quang Ngai	An Nhon	169.5 km
2	Cau Gie - Ninh Binh	Cau Gie	Ninh Binh	50 km	10	Binh Dinh - Nha Trang	An Nhon	Dien Khanh	215 km
3	Ninh Binh – Thanh Hoa	Ninh Binh	Nghi Son	121 km	11	Nha Trang – Phan Thiet	Dien Khanh	Phan Thiet	226 km
4	Thanh Hoa - Ha Tinh	Nghi Son	Hong Linh	97 km	12	Phan Thiet - Dau Giay	Phan Thiet	Long Khanh	98 km
5	Ha Tinh - Quang Binh	Hong Linh	Bung	145 km	13	HCMC - Long Thanh - Dau Giay	Long Khanh	Long Thanh	43 km
6	Quang Binh - Quang Tri	Bung	Cam Lo	117 km	14	Long Thanh - Ben Luc	Long Thanh	Ben Luc	58 km
7	Quang Tri - Da Nang	Cam Lo	Tuy Loan	182.48 km	15	HCMC - Trung Luong	Bến Lức	Châu Thành	37 km
8	Da Nang - Quang Ngai	Tuy Loan	Quang Ngai	130 km	16	Trung Luong - My Thuan - Can Tho	Chau Thanh	Can Tho	92 km

=== 2021 ===
In September 2021, the Government announced the Road Network Plan for the 2021–2030 period, with a vision to 2050, re-planned the North-South Expressway from Huu Nghi border gate (Cao Lộc, Lạng Sơn) to Ca Mau city (Ca Mau province) with a length of about 2,063 km, scale from 4 to 10 lanes. The whole route is divided into 3 major segments, the Hanoi to Can Tho segment is CT.01 in the 2010 master plan. The total number of subdivided sections is 38. All will be built before 2030.

- Segment of Huu Nghi Border Gate - Phap Van

Name	Expressway section name	Province/Municipality	Length
1	Huu Nghi border gate - Chi Lang	Lạng Sơn	43 km
2	Chi Lang – Bac Giang	Lạng Sơn – Bắc Giang	64 km
3	Bac Giang – Phu Đong Bridge	Bac Giang – Hanoi	46 km
4	Ring Road 3 (Hanoi) from Phu Dong Bridge to Phap Van (including low road)	Hanoi	14 km

- Segment of Hanoi - Can Tho

Name	Expressway section name	Province/Municipality	Length	Name	Expressway section name	Province/Municipality	Length
1	Phap Van - Cau Gie	Hanoi	30 km	17	Quang Ngai - Hoai Nhon	Quảng Ngãi – Bình Định	88 km
2	Cau Gie - Cao Bo	Hanoi – Hà Nam – Nam Định	50 km	18	Hoai Nhon - Quy Nhon	Bình Định	69 km
3	Cao Bo - Mai Son	Nam Định – Ninh Bình	15 km	19	Quy Nhon - Chi Thanh	Bình Định – Phú Yên	68 km
4	Mai Son - National Route 45	Ninh Bình – Thanh Hóa	63 km	20	Chi Thanh - Van Phong	Phú Yên – Khánh Hòa	51 km
5	National Route 45 - Nghi Son	Thanh Hóa	43 km	21	Deo Ca Tunnel	Phú Yên – Khánh Hòa	14 km
6	Nghi Son - Dien Chau	Thanh Hóa – Nghệ An	50 km	22	Van Phong - Nha Trang	Khánh Hòa	83 km
7	Dien Chau - Bai Vot	Nghệ An – Hà Tĩnh	49 km	23	Nha Trang - Cam Lam	Khánh Hòa	49 km
8	Bai Vot - Ham Nghi	Hà Tĩnh	36 km	24	Cam Lam - Vinh Hao	Khánh Hòa – Ninh Thuận – Bình Thuận	79 km
9	Ham Nghi - Vung Ang	Hà Tĩnh	54 km	25	Vinh Hao - Phan Thiet	Bình Thuận	101 km
10	Vung Ang - Bung	Hà Tĩnh – Quảng Bình	58 km	26	Phan Thiet - Dau Giay	Bình Thuận – Đồng Nai	99 km
11	Bung - Van Ninh	Quảng Bình	51 km	27	HCMC - Long Thanh - Dau Giay	Đồng Nai	21 km
12	Van Ninh - Cam Lo	Quảng Bình – Quảng Trị	68 km	28	Long Thanh - Ben Luc	Đồng Nai – HCMC – Long An	58 km
13	Cam Lo - La Son	Quảng Trị – Huế	98 km	29	HCMC - Trung Luong	HCMC - Long An - Tiền Giang	40 km
14	La Son - Hoa Lien	Huế – Đà Nẵng	66 km	30	Trung Luong - My Thuan	Tiền Giang	51 km
15	Hoa Lien - Tuy Loan	Đà Nẵng	12 km	31	My Thuan 2 Bridge	Tiền Giang - Vĩnh Long	7 km
16	Da Nang - Quang Ngai	Đà Nẵng – Quảng Ngãi	127 km	32	My Thuan - Can Tho	Tiền Giang – Cần Thơ	23 km

- Segment of Can Tho - Ca Mau

Number	Expressway section name	Province/Municipality	Length
1	Can Tho 2 Bridge	Cần Thơ	15 km
2	Can Tho - Ca Mau	Cần Thơ – Cà Mau	109 km

=== Investment stages ===
The entire expressway construction process is divided into several stages, each phase building a number of smaller routes in the larger sections. The plan for budget construction and use of each period is approved by the National Assembly of Vietnam. As follows:

- In the period of 2017–2020, the investment is for 654 km, the total investment is VND 118,716 billion

Number	Expressway section name	Length	Lanes	Preliminary investment level (billion VND)
1	Cao Bo - Mai Son	15 km	4	1,612
2	Mai Son - National Route 45	63 km	4	14,703
3	National Route 45 - Nghi Son	43 km	4	7,769
4	Nghi Son - Dien Chau	50 km	4	8,648
5	Dien Chau - Bai Vot	50 km	4	13,596
6	Cam Lo - La Son	102 km	2	7,900
7	Nha Trang - Cam Lam	29 km	4	5,131
8	Cam Lam - Vinh Hao	91 km	4	15,013
9	Vinh Hao - Phan Thiet	106 km	4	19,648
10	Phan Thiet - Dau Giay	98 km	4	19,571
11	My Thuan 2 Bridge and the path to the two ends of the bridge	7 km	6	5,125

- In the 2021–2025 period, an additional 729 km will be invested, with a total investment of VND 148,492 billion (of which the State budget is VND 131,217 billion and capital from private partners is VND 17,125 billion).

Number	Expressway section name	Length	Lanes	Preliminary investment level (billion VND).
1	Bai Vot - Ham Nghi	36 km	4	7,588
2	Ham Nghi – Vung Ang	54 km	4	10.707
3	Vung Ang – Bung	58 km	4	11,785
4	Bung – Van Ninh	51 km	4	10,526
5	Van Ninh - Cam Lo	68 km	4	10,591
6	Quang Ngai - Hoai Nhon	88 km	4	20,898
7	Hoai Nhon - Quy Nhon	69 km	4	12,544
8	Quy Nhon - Chi Thanh	62 km	4	12,298
9	Chi Thanh - Van Phong	51 km	4	10,978
10	Van Phong - Nha Trang	83 km	4	13,324
11	Can Tho - Hau Giang	37 km	4	9,768
12	Hau Giang - Ca Mau	72 km	4	17,485

== Status ==
No.	Name	Start	End	Length (km)	Lanes	Speed	Construction Start	Expected completion	Completed	Construction Time	Expansion
1	Huu Nghi–Chi Lang	Đồng Đăng, Cao Lộc (Km 1+800)	Mai Sao, Chi Lăng; Km 44+750 (delivered National Route 1	43 km	4	90 km/h	21/4/2024	2026	-	-	-
2	Chi Lang–Bac Giang	Mai Sao, Chi Lăng (Km 44+750 delivered National Route 1)	Dĩnh Trì, Bắc Giang(Km 113+985)	63.86 km	4	100 km/h	5/7/2015	2017; 12/2019	29/9/2019	4 years, 2 months	-
3	Bac Giang–Phu Dong Bridge (Note: In fact, it is a project to renovate and upgrade National Highway 1A, section Hanoi - Bac Giang)	Dĩnh Trì, Bắc Giang(Km 113+985 delivered National Route 31)	Phù Đổng, Gia Lâm (Km 159+100 Phù Đổng Bridge)	45.8 km	4	100 km/h	22/2/2014	6/2016	6/1/2016	1 year, 10 months	-
4	Ring Road 3 Hanoi (Phù Đổng Bridge-Pháp Vân)	Phù Đổng, Gia Lâm (Km 159+100 Phù Đổng Bridge)	Đại Kim, Hoàng Mai (Km 28+532)	19.061 km	4	100 km/h	30/11/2002 (Note: Commencement of Thanh Tri Bridge in Ring Road Project 3)	2007	19/1/2012 (Note: Opening to traffic on Phu Dong 2 bridge in Ring Road 3 project)	9 years, 1 month	-
5	Phap Van–Cau Gie	Hoàng Liệt, Hoàng Mai	Đại Xuyên, Phú Xuyên (Km 211+500 National Route 1)	32.3 km	6	100 km/h	4/9/1998	2002	1/1/2002	3 years, 3 months	2019 (6 lanes)
6	Cau Gie–Ninh Binh	Đại Xuyên, Phú Xuyên (Km 211+500 National Route 1)	Yên Hồng, Ý Yên (Km 259+100 National Route 10)	47.06 km	4	120 km/h	7/1/2006	2008	30/6/2012	6 years, 5 months	-
7	Cao Bo–Mai Son	Yên Hồng, Ý Yên (Km 259+100 National Route 10)	Mai Sơn, Yên Mô (Km 274+100 delivered National Route 1 pass Ninh Binh city)	15 km	4	80 km/h	2/12/2019	1/2022	4/2/2022	2 years, 2 months	2026 (6 lanes)
8	Mai Son–National Route 45	Mai Sơn, Yên Mô (Km 274+100 delivered National Route 1 pass Ninh Binh city)	Tân Phúc, Nông Cống (Km 337+000)	63.37 km	4	90 km/h	30/9/2020	30/6/2023	29/4/2023	2 years, 6 months	-
9	National Route 45–Nghi Son	Tân Phúc, Nông Cống (Km 337+000)	Tân Trường, Nghi Sơn (Km 379+900)	43.28 km	4	90 km/h	19/7/2021	7/2023	1/9/2023	2 years, 1 month	-
10	Nghi Son–Dien Chau	Tân Trường, Nghi Sơn (Km 379+900)	Diễn Cát, Diễn Châu (Km 429+450)	43.5km	4	90 km/h	2/7/2021	7/2023	1/9/2023	2 years, 1 month	-
11	Dien Chau–Bai Vot	Diễn Cát, Diễn Châu(Km 429+450)	Thanh Bình Thịnh, Đức Thọ(Km 479+117)	49.3 km	4	90 km/h	22/5/2021	4/2023	28/4/2024	2 years, 11 months	-
12	Bai Vot–Ham Nghi	Thanh Bình Thịnh, Đức Thọ(Km 479+117)	Thạch Xuân, Thạch Hà (Km 514+441)	35.28 km	4	90 km/h	1/1/2023	30/4/2025	28/4/2025	2 years, 4 months	-
13	Ham Nghi–Vung Ang	Thạch Xuân, Thạch Hà(Km 514+300)	Kỳ Tân, Kỳ Anh (Km 568+182)	54.2 km	4	90 km/h	1/1/2023	30/4/2025	28/4/2025	2 years, 4 months	-
14	Vung Ang–Bung	Kỳ Tân, Kỳ Anh(Km 568+200)	Cự Nẫm, Bố Trạch (Km 624+228)	55.34 km	4	90 km/h	1/1/2023	30/4/2025	19/8/2025	2 years, 7 months	-
15	Bung–Van Ninh	Cự Nẫm, Bố Trạch (Km 625+000)	Vạn Ninh, Quảng Ninh (Km 674+556)	48.4 km	4	90 km/h	1/1/2023	30/4/2025	28/4/2025	2 years, 4 months	-
16	Van Ninh - Cam Lo	Van Ninh, Quang Ninh (Km 675+400)	Cam Hieu, Cam Lo (Km 744+600 delivered Km 11+920 National Route 9)	65.7 km	4	90 km/h	1/1/2023	30/4/2025	19/8/2025	2 years, 7 months	-
17	Cam Lo - La Son	Cam Hieu, Cam Lo (Km 744+800 delivered Km 11+920 National Route 9)	Loc Son, Phu Loc (Km 847 delivered Km 4 Provincial Road 14B)	98.35 km	2	80 km/h	16/9/2019	31/12/2022	31/12/2022	3 years, 2 months	2026 (4 lanes)
18	La Son - Hoa Lien (Note: Part of the Ho Chi Minh Road Project, La Son – Tuy Loan section)	Loc Son, Phu Loc (Km 847)	Hoa Lien, Hoa Vang (Km 913)	66 km	2	80 km/h	22/12/2013	12/2017	16/4/2022	8 years, 3 months	2026 (4 lanes)
19	Hoa Lien - Tuy Loan (Note: Part of the Ho Chi Minh Road Project, La Son – Tuy Loan section)	Hoa Lien, Hoa Vang (Km 913)	Hoa Phong, Hoa Vang (Km 924+550)	11.5 km	4	80 km/h	8/2023	2026	19/8/2025	2 years	-
20	Da Nang - Quang Ngai	Hoa Phong, Hoa Vang (Km 924+550)	Nghia Thuong, Tu Nghia (Km 1064+075 delivered National Route 1)	139.52 km	4	100–120 km/h 80 km/h (National Route 1 section)	19/5/2013	5/2017	2/8/2017; 2/9/2018	5 years, 3 months	-
21	Quang Ngai - Hoai Nhon	Nghia Ky, Tu Nghia (Km 1051+720)	Bong Son, Hoai Nhon (Km 1139+800 (PR629))	88 km	4	90 km/h	1/1/2023	2025	12/02/2026	3 years, 1 month	-
22	Hoai Nhon - Quy Nhon	Bong Son, Hoai Nhon (Km 1139+800 (PR629))	Nhon Hoa, An Nhon Km (1209+000)	70.1 km	4	90 km/h	1/1/2023	2026	12/02/2026	3 years, 1 month	-
23	Quy Nhon - Chi Thanh	Nhon Hoa, An Nhon (Km 1209+000)	Chi Thanh, Tuy An Km (1277+450)	61.7 km	4	90 km/h	1/1/2023	2026	-	-	-
24	Chi Thanh - Van Phong	Chi Thanh, Tuy An (Km 1277+450)	Hoa Xuan Nam, Đong Hoa (Km 1328+600)	48.1 km	4	80 km/h	1/1/2023	2026	-	-	-
25	Deo Ca Tunnel	Hoa Xuan Nam, Đong Hoa (Km 1328+600)	Van Tho, Van Ninh (Km 1342+650)	13.9 km	4	80 km/h	18/11/2013	21/8/2017	21/8/2017	4 years, 9 months	-
26	Van Phong - Nha Trang	Van Tho, Van Ninh (Km 1342+650)	Dien Tho, Dien Khanh (Km 1426)	83.35 km	4	80 km/h	1/1/2023	2025	-	-	-
27	Nha Trang - Cam Lam	Dien Tho, Dien Khanh (Km 1426)	Cam Thinh Tay, Cam Ranh (Km 1475+300)	49 km	4	80 km/h	15/7/2021	7/2023	19/5/2023	1 year, 10 months	-
28	Cam Lam - Vinh Hao	Cam Thinh Tay, Cam Ranh (Km 1475+500)	Vinh Hao, Tuy Phong (Km 1554)	78.5 km	4	80 km/h	30/7/2021	26/4/2024	28/4/2024	2 years, 8 months	-
29	Vinh Hao - Phan Thiet	Vinh Hao, Tuy Phong (Km 1554)	Ham Kiem, Ham Thuan Nam (km 1654+800)	100.8 km	4	80–120 km/h	30/9/2020	-	15/5/2023	2 years, 7 months	-
30	Phan Thiet - Dau Giay (Note: Part of the Ho Chi Minh City – Long Thanh – Dau Giay Expressway)	Ham Kiem, Ham Thuan Nam (Km 1655+000 delivered National Route 1 at Km2+500)	Dau Giay, Thong Nha5 (Km1754+125)	99 km	6	120 km/h	30/9/2020	12/2022	29/4/2023	2 years, 6 months	-
31	Dau Giay - Long Thanh (Note: Part of the Ho Chi Minh City – Long Thanh – Dau Giay Expressway)	Dau Giay, Thong Nhat at Km 1741+000 National Route 1	Long An, Long Thanh (Km 1756 delivered Bien Hoa–Vung Tau Expressway)	31.1 km	4	120 km/h	3/10/2009	2012	8/2/2015	5 years, 4 months	2026 (6 lanes)
–	Bien Hoa–Vung Tau (from Long Thanh to Tan Hiep)	Tan Hiep, Long Thanh at (Km 29+600 delivered Long Thanh - Ben Luc Expressway)	Long An, Long Thanh at (Km 16+800 delivered Dau Giay - Long Thanh Expressway)	28.4 km	6	90–120 km/h	18/06/2023				
32	Long Thanh - Ben Luc (Note: Part of the HCMC 3rd Ring Road Expressway)	Phuoc Thai, Long Thanh (Km 1784+500 delivered Bien Hoa–Vung Tau Expressway)	My Yen, Ben Luc (Km 1842+500)	57.1 km	4	120 km/h	19/7/2014	2018 (original); 9/2026	-	-	-
33	Ho Chi Minh City–Trung Luong	Tan Tuc, Binh Chanh (Km 1839)	Than Cuu Nghia, Chau Thanh (Km 1879+620)	41 km	4	120 km/h	16/12/2004	2008	3/2/2010	5 years, 1 months	2028 (8 lanes)
34	Trung Luong - My Thuan	Than Cuu Nghia, Chau Thanh (Km 1879+620)	An Thai Trung (Km 1930+750 delivered National Route 30)	51.1 km	4	120 km/h	29/11/2009	2013	19/1/2022 27/4/2022	12 years, 3 months	2028 (6 lanes)
35	My Thuan 2 Bridge	An Thai Trung (Km 1931+726 delivered National Route 30)	Tan Hoa, Vinh Long City (Km 1937+740 delivered National Route 80)	6.61 km	4-6	80–100 km/h	19/8/2020	2023	24/12/2023	3 years, 4 months	-
36	My Thuan - Can Tho	Tan Hoa, Vinh Long City (Km 1937+363.08 My Thuan 2 Bridge)	Thuan An, Binh Minh (Km 1959+337 delivered National Route 1)	22.97 km	4-6	80–100 km/h	4/1/2021	12/2023	24/12/2023	3 years, 4 months	-
37	Can Tho 2 Bridge	Thuan An, Binh Minh (Km 1960 delivered National Route 1)	Cai Rang, Can Tho (Km 1975+050 delivered National Route 1)	15 km	4	80 km/h	2026	2030	-	-	-
38	Can Tho - Hau Giang	Cai Rang, Can Tho (Km 1975+050 delivered National Route 1)	Vi Thang, Vi Thuy (Km 2028)	37.65 km	4	80 km/h	1/1/2023	2025	22/12/2025	2 years, 11 months	-
39	Hau Giang - Ca Mau	Vi Thang, Vi Thuy (Km 2028)	Ca Mau City (Km 2083)	72.2 km	4	100 km/h	1/1/2023	1/2026	19/1/2026	3 years	-

Note

Construction not started	Under Construction	Completed	Slow progress
