= Bac Giang–Lang Son Expressway =

Road in Vietnam

CT.01 Expressway
- Bac Giang-Lang Son Expressway
- Đường cao tốc Bắc Giang–Lạng Sơn
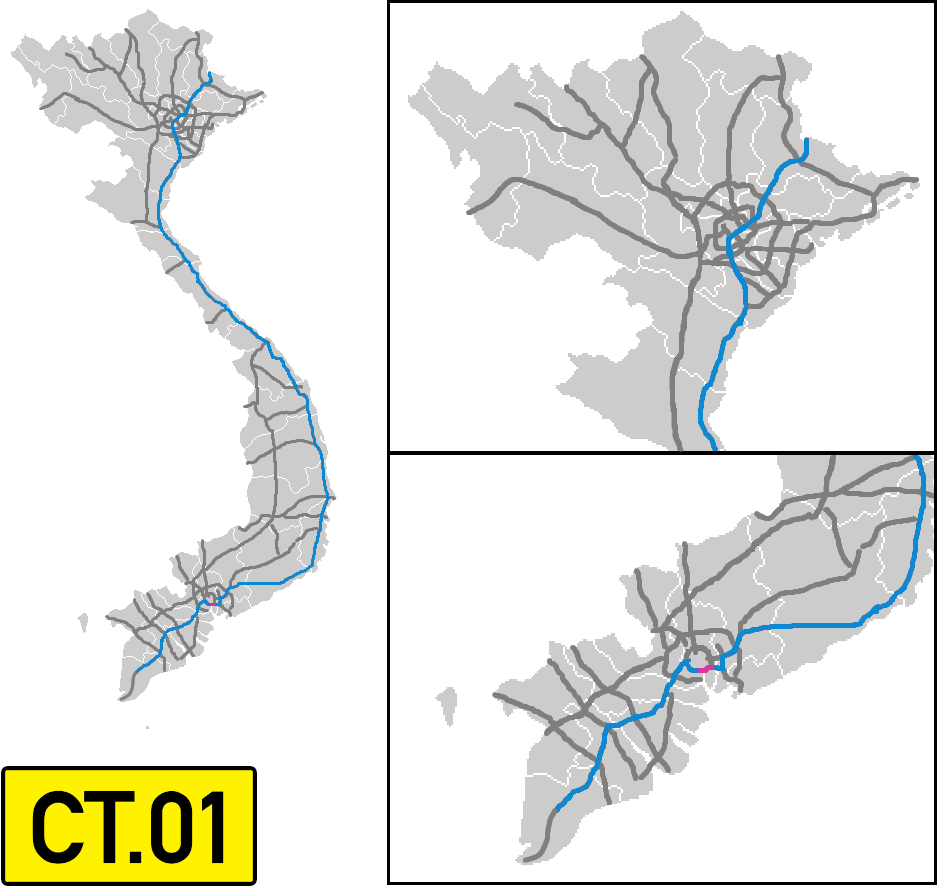

Route information
- Part of AH1
- Length: 107 km (66 mi)
- Status: Under construction: Chi Lang-Lang Son (43km): 2026
- Existed: Sept 9, 2019–present

Major junctions
- Northeast end: at China border in Hữu Nghị International Border Gate, Cao Lộc, Lạng Sơn
- in Đồng Đăng, Cao Lộc, Lạng Sơn; in Gia Cát, Cao Lộc, Lạng Sơn; in Yên Trạch, Cao Lộc, Lạng Sơn; in Đồng Mỏ, Chi Lăng, Lạng Sơn; in Kép, Bắc Giang
- Southwest end: at Dĩnh Trì, Bắc Giang city, Bắc Giang

Location
- Country: Vietnam
- Provinces: Bắc Giang, Lạng Sơn

Highway system
- Transport in Vietnam

The Bac Giang–Lang Son Expressway (Vietnamese: Đường cao tốc Bắc Giang–Lạng Sơn) is the first expressway section of the North-South Expressway East system passing through the two provinces of Lạng Sơn and Bắc Giang.

== Planning ==
According to the planning from 2015 to 2021, this expressway and the Hanoi–Bac Giang expressway were once part of the Hanoi–Lang Son Expressway, old symbol is CT.03 before the entire old highway was merged into part of the North-South Expressway East

This route has a total length of 107 km, including 2 sections: Hữu Nghị-Chi Lăng and Chi Lăng-Bắc Giang.

== Design ==
The Chi Lăng-Bắc Giang section is 64 km long, of which the section through Bắc Giang is 22 km long and Lạng Sơn is 42 km long, starting from Km 45+100. (intersection with National Route 1 at Mai Sao commune, Chi Lăng district, Lạng Sơn province) and the end point at Km 108+500 connecting to National Route 1, Hanoi–Bac Giang Expressway section, 25 m wide road surface, including 4 lanes, 2 emergency lanes with design speed of 100 km/h

The Hữu Nghị-Chi Lăng section is 43 km long. In phase 1, the road is invested in 4 lanes without emergency lanes, with emergency stops every 4 – 5 km/point, the road surface is 17m wide, maximum speed is 90 km/h. Phase 2 will increase to 6 lanes and 2 continuous emergency lanes, roadbed width 32.25m; maximum speed 100 km/h.

== Route details ==
Expressway speed information board (Chi Lăng-Bắc Giang section, in reality the route is still marked as CT.03)

=== Lanes ===
- Hữu Nghị-Chi Lăng section 4 lanes, with emergency stops every 4–5 km
- Chi Lăng-Bắc Giang section: 4 lanes, 2 emergency lanes

=== Length ===
- Hữu Nghị-Chi Lăng section: 43 kilometres (27 mi)
- Chi Lăng-Bắc Giang section: 64 kilometres (40 mi)

=== Speed ===
- Hữu Nghị-Chi Lăng section: Maximum 90 kilometres per hour (56 mph), Minimum: 60 kilometres per hour (37 mph)
- Chi Lăng-Bắc Giang section: Maximum 100 kilometres per hour (62 mph), Minimum: 60 kilometres per hour (37 mph)

== List of interchanges and features ==
- IC - interchange, JCT - junction, SA - service area, PA - parking area, BS - bus stop, TN - tunnel, TB - toll gate, BR - bridge

No.	Name	Dist. from Origin	Connections	Notes	Location	
Connect with Nanning–Youyiguan Expressway through to Hữu Nghị International Border Gate, Cao Lộc, Lạng Sơn
1	Hữu Nghị International Border Gate JCT	1.8	National Route 1	Under Construction	Lạng Sơn	Cao Lộc
TG	Toll Gate			Under Construction	Lạng Sơn	Cao Lộc
2	Cao Lộc IC	5.3	National Route 1	Under Construction	Lạng Sơn	Cao Lộc
3	Lạng Sơn IC	11.5	National Route 4B	Under Construction	Lạng Sơn	Lạng Sơn City
4	IC.4	17.8	National Route 1	Connect with Tien Yen–Lang Son–Cao Bang Expressway; Not Construction	Lạng Sơn	Cao Lộc
5	IC.5	32.8	National Route 1	Under Construction	Lạng Sơn	Chi Lăng
6	Mai Sao IC	44.75	National Route 1		Lạng Sơn	Chi Lăng
7	National Route 279 IC	56.6	National Route 279		Lạng Sơn	Chi Lăng
BR	Railway overpass 1	↓		Pass Hà Nội–Đồng Đăng Railway	Lạng Sơn	Hữu Lũng
8	Hồ Sơn IC	80.0	Đường tỉnh 242		Lạng Sơn	Hữu Lũng
BR	Thương River 1 Bridge	↓		Pass Thương River	Lạng Sơn	Hữu Lũng
BR	Thương River 2 Bridge	↓		Pass Thương River	Lạng Sơn–Bắc Giang Border	
BR	Railway overpass 2	↓		Pass Hà Nội–Đồng Đăng Railway	Bắc Giang	Lạng Giang
BR	Railway overpass 3 and National Route 37	↓		Pass National Route 37 and Kép–Hạ Long railway	Bắc Giang	Lạng Giang
9	National Route 37	94.0	National Route 37		Bắc Giang	Lạng Giang
TG	Toll Gate	104.0			Bắc Giang	Lạng Giang
10	Xương Lâm IC			Under Construction	Bắc Giang	Lạng Giang
11	Dĩnh Trì JCT	107	National Route 31; National Route 1		Bắc Giang	Bắc Giang City
Connect directly with Hanoi–Bac Giang Expressway ( National Route 1)
1.000 mi = 1.609 km; 1.000 km = 0.621 mi: Proposed; Incomplete access; Route transition; Unopened
