= Chi Lăng (disambiguation) =

Chi Lăng is the name of several places in Vietnam. The name was derived from Chi Lăng pass in current-day Lạng Sơn Province, which was the site of many battles between feudal Vietnam and northern armies.

- Chi Lăng District, a rural district of Lạng Sơn Province
- Chi Lăng, Gia Lai, a ward of Pleiku
- Chi Lăng, Lạng Sơn City, a ward of Lạng Sơn City
- Chi Lăng, An Giang, a township of Tịnh Biên District
- Chi Lăng (township of Chi Lăng District), a township of Chi Lăng District
- Chi Lăng, Bắc Ninh, a rural commune of Quế Võ District
- Chi Lăng (commune of Chi Lăng District), a rural commune of Chi Lăng District
- Chi Lăng, Tràng Định, a rural commune of Tràng Định District, Lạng Sơn Province
- Chi Lăng, Thái Bình, a rural commune of Hưng Hà District

== Other uses ==
- Chi Lăng Stadium, a multi-purpose stadium in Đà Nẵng
