= National Route 47 (Vietnam) =

National Route 47
- Quốc lộ 47

Route information
- Length: 138 km (86 mi)

Major junctions
- From: Sầm Sơn Ward, Thanh Hóa province
- CT.01 at Đông Xuân intersection, Đông Sơn Ward
- South end: Kheo Border Gate, Laotian border

Location
- Country: Vietnam

Highway system
- Transport in Vietnam

National Highway 47 (Vietnamese: Quốc lộ 47) is a national road located within Thanh Hóa Province, Vietnam.

National Highway 47 has a total length of 138 km; its starting point is in Sầm Sơn, and its ending point is at the Khẹo border gate in Bát Mọt.

There are plans to expand the highway.
