= National Route 30 (Vietnam) =

Road in Vietnam

National Route 30
- Quốc lộ 30
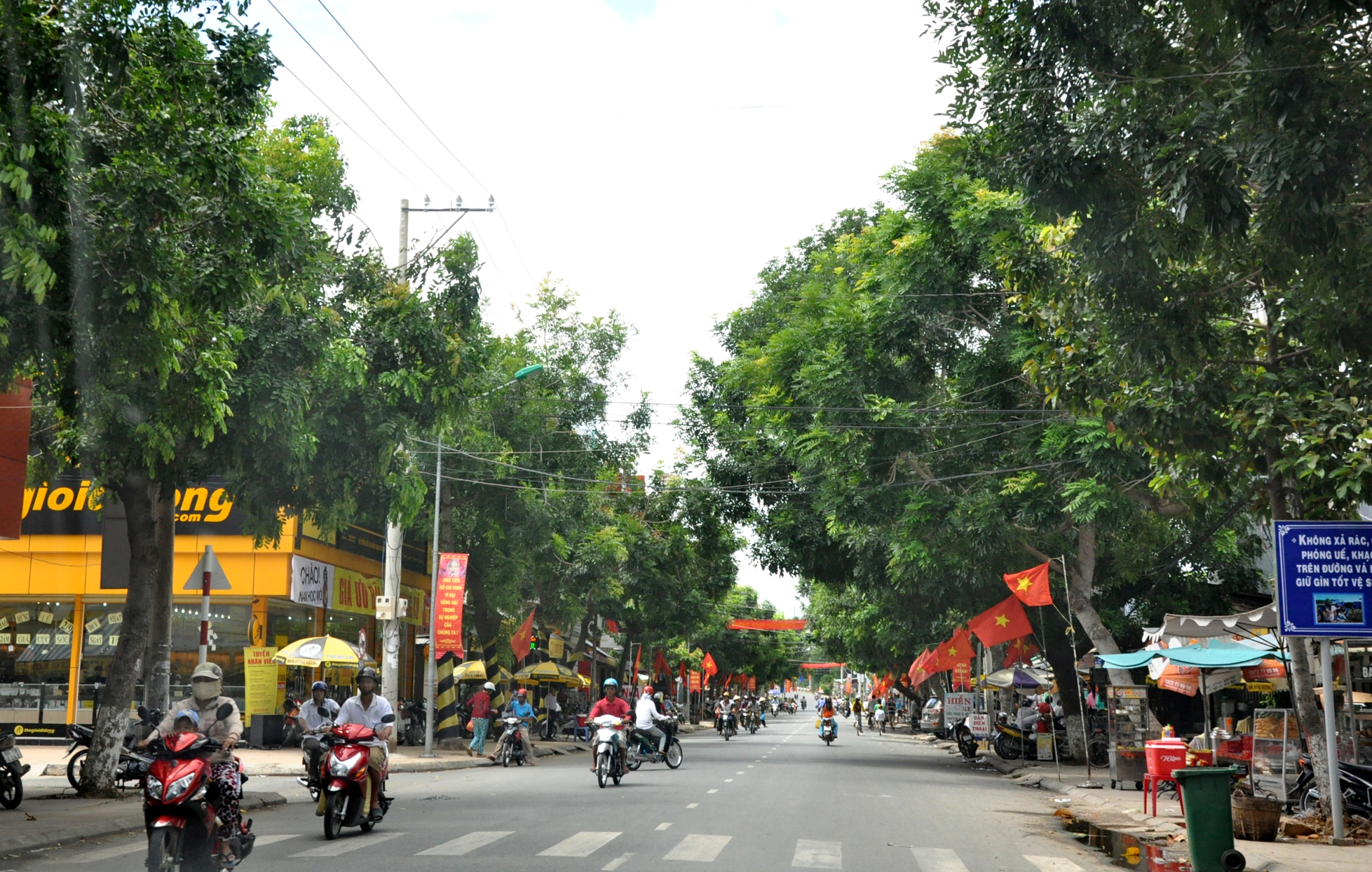
- In Hồng Ngự

Route information
- Length: 119.64 km (74.34 mi)

Major junctions
- West end: QL 1 north of Vĩnh Long

- CT.01 in An Thai Trung QL N2 / ĐHCM in Cao Lãnh
- East end: Dinh Bà Border Gate at Cambodian border

Location
- Country: Vietnam

Highway system
- Transport in Vietnam
| ← QL 29 | → QL 31 |

National Route 30 (Vietnamese: Quốc lộ 30) is a highway in the Mekong Delta region of Vietnam stretching from just north of Vĩnh Long, the capital of Vĩnh Long Province, northwest parallel to the Tiền Giang River into Đồng Tháp Province before meeting the Cambodian border along the northeastern bank of the Tiền Giang River. National Route 30 diverges northwest from National Route 1 just north of Vinh Long, on the opposite side of the Tien Giang. It passes through Tiền Giang Province and the towns of Cao Lãnh, Tan Dong, Tam Nông, An Long and Hồng Ngự.
