= Năm Căn economic zone =

Economic zone in Vietnam

Năm Căn economic zone (Vietnamese: Khu kinh tế Năm Căn) is an economic zone established in 2010s, located in Năm Căn district (Now Năm Căn commune).

== Planning ==
Following the passing of Resolution No.66/2010/QĐ on establishing Năm Căn economic zone. As stated, the region has an area covering 11.000 hectares located along the National Route 1A in Nam Can town, Ham Rong commune, Han Vinh and Ong Do hamlet in Dat Moi commune.

The goal of Năm Căn economic zone is to maximize the advantages of natural conditions, geographical location in economical and political trade, international and domestic services, promote the socio-economic development of Cà Mau and the Mekong Delta (Đồng bằng sông Cửu Long) in order to contribute to narrowing the development gap with other areas in the country.

Năm Căn economic zone will be formed from enterprises in the mechanical industry, ship building, machine assembly, electronics, aquatic product processing industry, oil and gas industry and services, garments, building materials, consumer goods production and other auxiliary industries as well as coastal mangrove ecotourism and island tourism, port economy, non-tariff ports and urban zones.

The general planning and detailed planning for the construction of functional zones of the economic zone will be completed by the end of 2011. The period of 2012 - 2015 focuses on the construction of economic infrastructure and the period of 2016 - 2020 is the time to complete investment in infrastructure construction, focusing on attracting investment in production and business development.
