= Bung–Van Ninh Expressway =

Road in Vietnam

CT.01 Expressway
- Bung-Van Ninh Expressway
- Đường cao tốc Bùng–Vạn Ninh
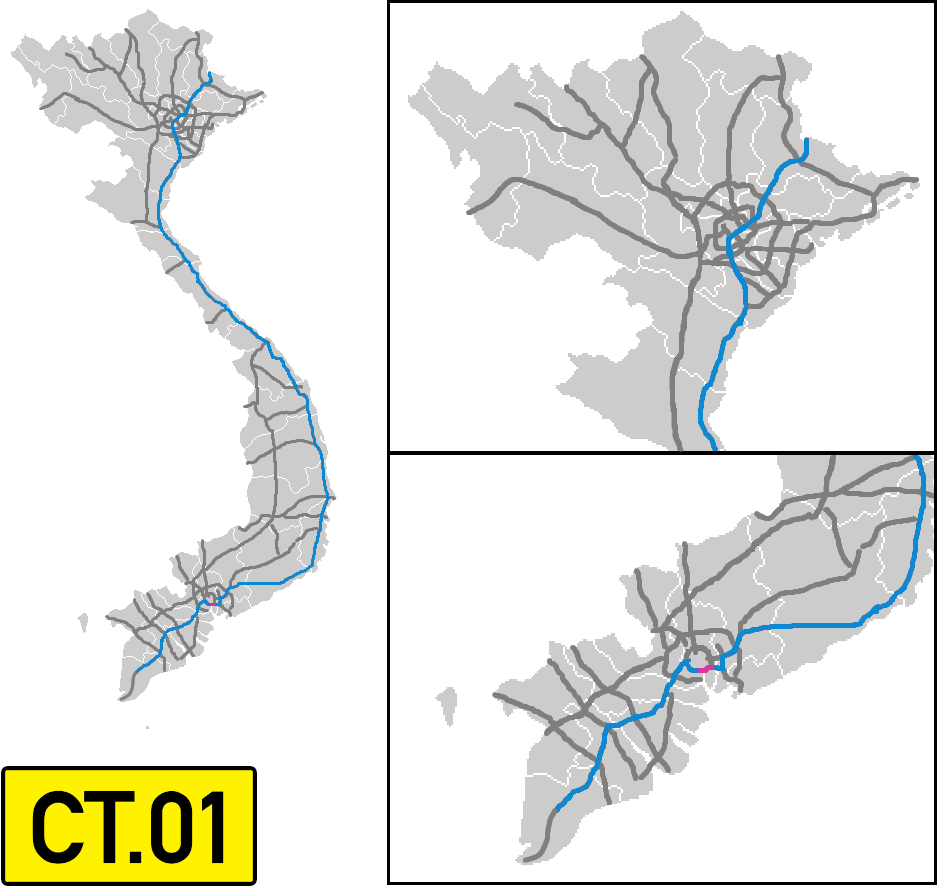

Route information
- Part of AH1
- Length: 48.84 km (30.35 mi)
- Status: Fully Completed
- Existed: 30 April 2025–present

Major junctions
- North end: in Bố Trạch commune, Quảng Trị province
- South end: in Trường Ninh commune, Quảng Trị province

Location
- Country: Vietnam
- Provinces: Quảng Trị
- Communes: Bố Trạch, Hoàn Lão, Nam Trạch, Đồng Sơn Ward, Trường Ninh, Quảng Ninh

Highway system
- Transport in Vietnam

The Bung–Van Ninh Expressway (Vietnamese: Đường cao tốc Bùng–Vạn Ninh) is a section of the North–South Expressway East and the North–South Expressway West located in Quảng Trị province.

== Design ==
The route has a total length of 48.84 km, the starting point of the road is connected to Vung Ang–Bung Expressway in Bố Trạch commune, Quảng Trị provinceand the end point is in Trường Ninh commune, Quảng Trị province connect with Van Ninh–Cam Lo Expressway currently under construction. The project has a divergent phase cross-section that meets the standards of a 4-lane highway without an emergency lane, with emergency stops arranged every 4–5 km/point with a roadbed width of 17m, and a design speed of 90 km/h. In the completed phase, the road will have 6 lanes, 32.25m wide, with 2 emergency lanes, and a design speed of 100 km/h.

== Construction ==
The route has a total investment of VND 9,361 billion, and was started on January 1, 2023. The expected construction time is 34 months. The project is expected to be completed and put into use on April 30, 2025.

== Route details ==
=== Lanes ===
- 4 lanes, with emergency stops every 4–5 km/point

=== Length ===
- Total route: 48.84 km

=== Speed limit ===
- Maximum: 90 km/h
- Minimum: 60 km/h

== List of interchanges and features ==
- IC - interchange, JCT - junction, SA - service area, PA - parking area, BS - bus stop, TN - tunnel, TB - toll gate, BR - bridge

No.	Name	Dist. from Origin	Connections	Notes	Location	
Connect directly with Vung Ang–Bung Expressway
1	Cự Nẫm IC	626.7	Ho Chi Minh Highway		Quảng Trị	Bố Trạch
2	Việt Trung IC	643.5	Provincial Road 563		Quảng Trị	Nam Trạch
SA	Service Area km651	651			Quảng Trị	Đồng Sơn
3	Nhật Lệ 2 IC	Ho Chi Minh Highway and National Route 1			Quảng Trị	Đồng Sơn
BR	Long Đại Bridge	↓		Long Đại river pass	Quảng Trị	Trường Ninh
4	Vạn Ninh IC	674.6	National Route 9B		Quảng Trị	Trường Ninh
Connect directly with Van Ninh–Cam Lo Expressway
1.000 mi = 1.609 km; 1.000 km = 0.621 mi: Proposed; Incomplete access; Route transition; Unopened
