= Chi Lăng Park =

Park in Ho Chi Minh City

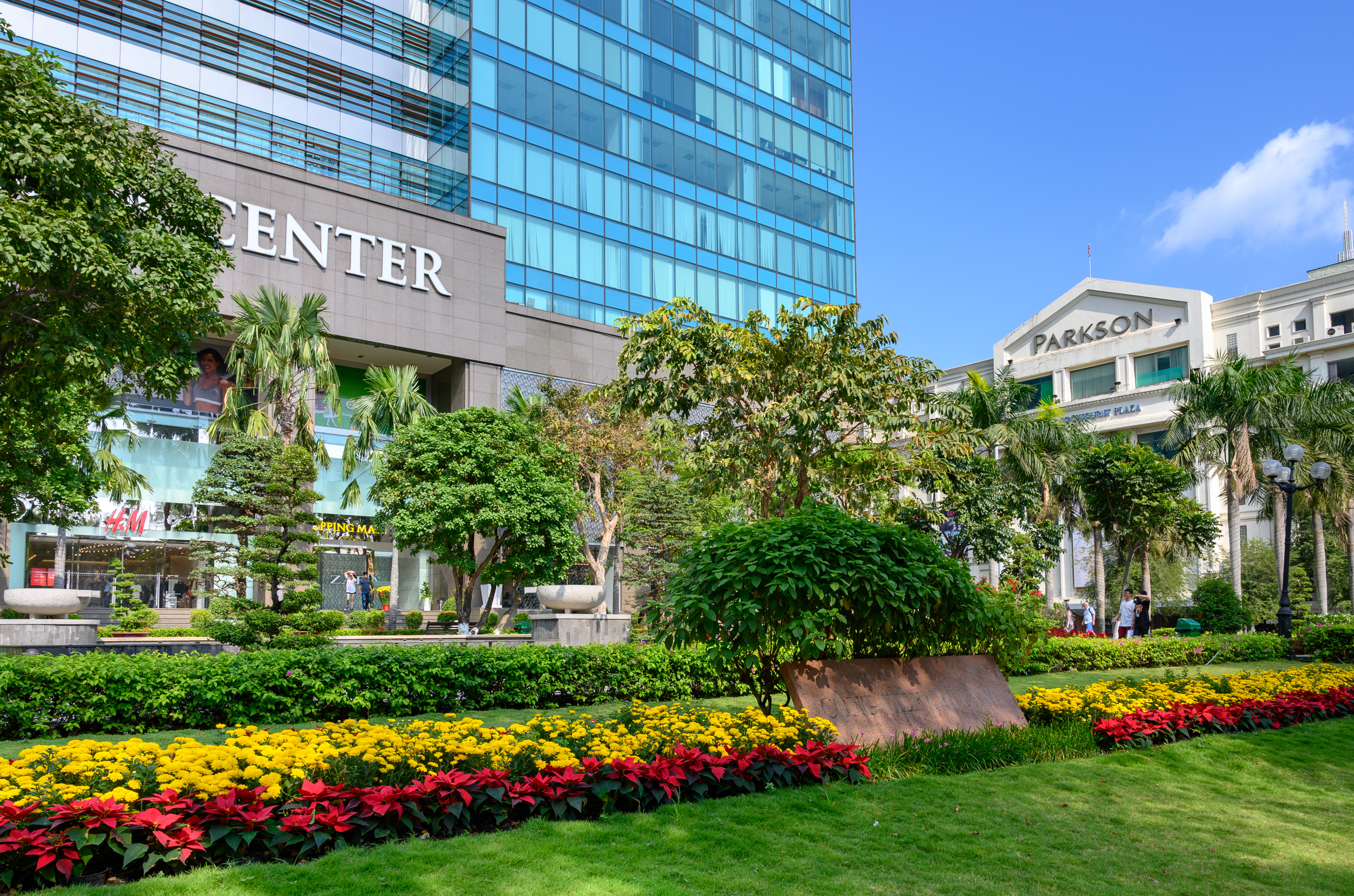
- The park in 2019
- Interactive map of Chi Lăng Park
- Type: Urban park
- Location: Bến Nghé, District 1, Ho Chi Minh City
- Coordinates: 10°46′40″N 106°42′06″E
- Area: 3,479 square metres (0.860 acres) (2007)
- Etymology: Battle of Chi Lăng
- Open: Yes
- Public transit: 1 Opera House station

Chi Lăng Park (Vietnamese: Công viên Chi Lăng) is a park located in the heart of Ho Chi Minh City, Vietnam, within the jurisdiction of District 1. It was named after the Battle of Chi Lăng in Lạng Sơn province.

The park is rectangular, with a declared area of 3,479 square metres (0.860 acres) as of 2007, stretching along Đồng Khởi Street, extending from the intersection with Lý Tự Trọng Street to the intersection with Lê Thánh Tôn Street. During the time of the Republic of Vietnam, the park was situated adjacent to the headquarters of the Ministry of Education. The park dates back to the French colonial period.

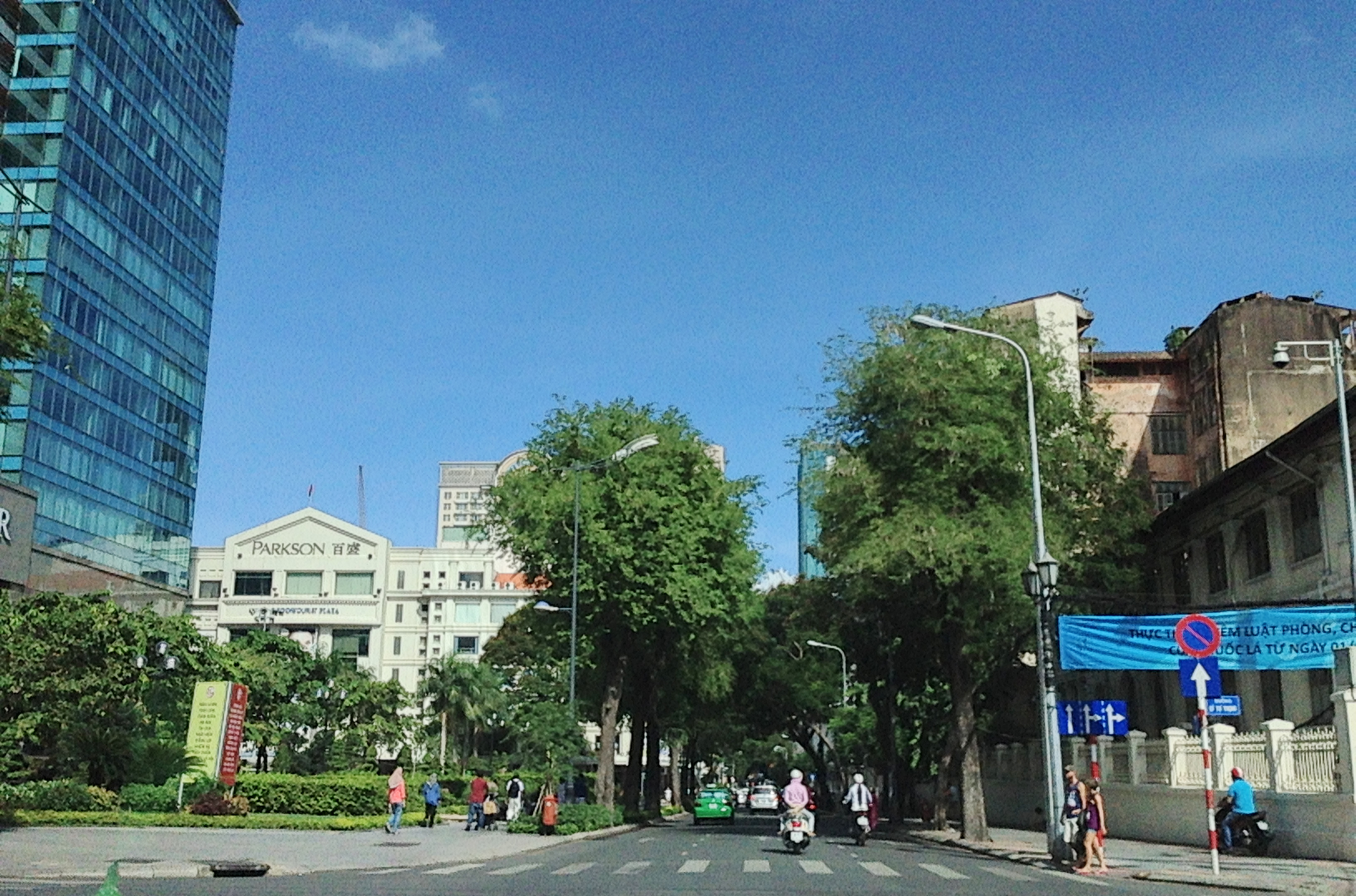
Chi Lăng Park (on the left) is seen from the intersection of Dong Khoi St. and Ly Tu Trong St.

Currently, Chi Lăng Park exists merely as a strip of greenery adjacent to a high-rise building inaugurated in 2010, named Vincom Center Đồng Khởi (originally named as Vincom Center B). In 2010, during a session of the Ho Chi Minh City People's Council, delegates raised concerns regarding whether the construction of the building had altered the park's original function. The City Department of Construction stated that the building's investor had been instructed to demolish several parts not compliant with the urban plan, with a requirement to restore the original state. However, in reality, the park's area has narrowed, making it impossible to plant large trees for shade due to the thin layer of soil overlying the building's basement, which also serves as the location for two emergency exits from the basement of the building.
