= Nông Cống district =

Coordinates: 19.617°N 105.667°E

Nông Cống district Huyện Nông Cống
- District
- Interactive map of Nông Cống district
- Country: Vietnam
- Region: North Central Coast
- Province: Thanh Hóa
- Capital: Nông Cống

Area
  - Total: 110 sq mi (286 km^{2})

Population (2018)
  - Total: 271,250
- Time zone: UTC+7 (UTC + 7)

Nông Cống is a district (huyện) of Thanh Hóa province in the North Central Coast region of Vietnam.

As of 2003 the district had a population of 185,052. The district covers an area of 286 km^{2} (110 sq mi). The district capital lies at Nông Cống.
