= Battle of Chi Lăng =

15th century Vietnamese and Chinese battle

Coordinates: 21.667°N 106.667°E

- Part of Lam Sơn uprising
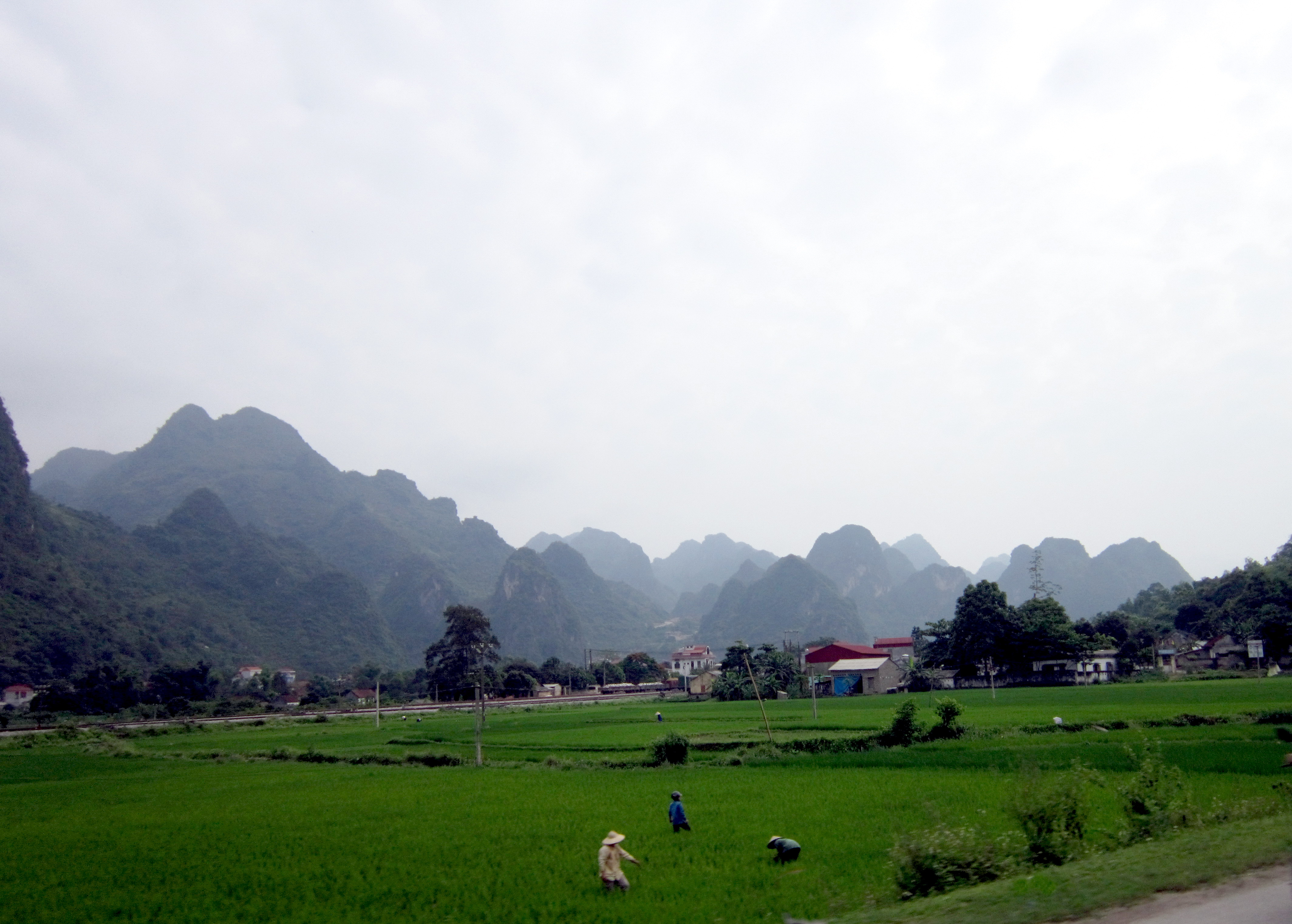
Date	September 18, 1427
Location	Chi Lăng District, Lạng Sơn Province
Result	Vietnamese victory

Belligerents
Vietnamese Lam Sơn rebels	Ming Dynasty

Commanders and leaders
Lê Lợi	Liu Sheng †; Huang Fu (POW); Mu Sheng

Strength
Unknown	Unknown

Casualties and losses
Unknown	70,000–90,000 30,000 captured

The Battle of Chi Lăng Pass was a short skirmish between Vietnamese forces under Prince Lê Lợi and Chinese Ming dynasty army under General Liu Sheng. The battle took place in the Chi Lăng valley, Chi Lăng District, Northeast Vietnam on September 18, 1427.

A large Chinese force under the command of Liu Sheng had been dispatched to relieve Wang Tong, who was besieged at Đông Quan in the aftermath of the Battle of Tốt Động – Chúc Động. At first, the Vietnamese pretended to flee, leading the charging Chinese cavalry into the marshes near Dao Ma Pha mountain where Chinese horses were bogged down, ambushed, and slaughtered.
