= Cao Lộc district =

Cao Lộc district Huyện Cao Lộc
- District
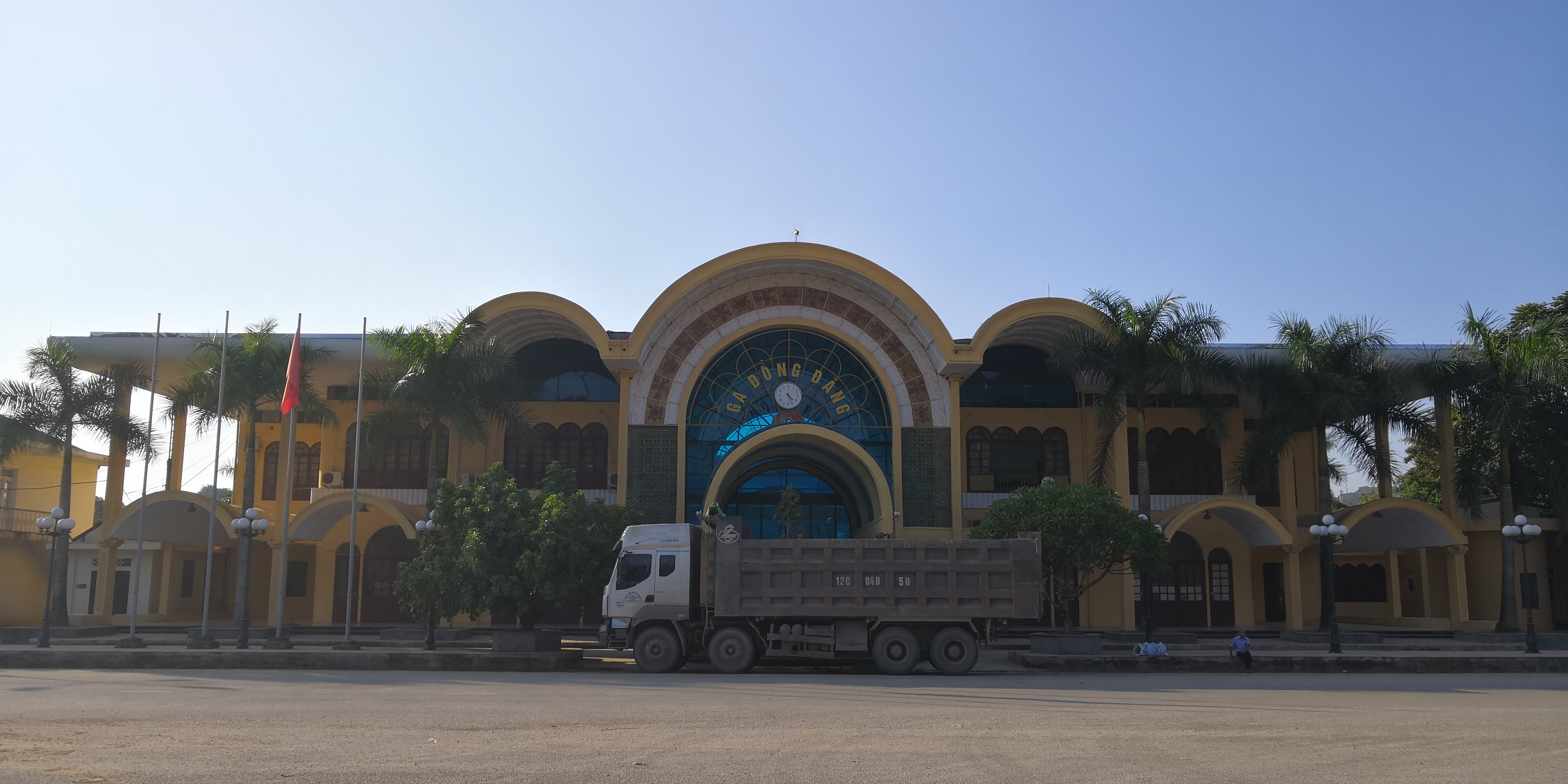
- Đồng Đăng station

- Seal
- Interactive map of Cao Lộc district
- Location within Vietnam
- Coordinates: 21.9058°N 106.8405°E
- Country: Vietnam
- Region: Northeast
- Province: Lạng Sơn
- Capital: Cao Lộc

Government
  - Chairman of the People's Committee: Nguyễn Duy Anh

Area
  - District: 249 sq mi (644 km^{2})

Population (2019)
  - District: 79,873
  - Density: 320/sq mi (124/km^{2})
  - Urban: 17,575
- Time zone: UTC+7 (Indochina Time)
- Website: caoloc.langson.gov.vn

Cao Lộc is a former rural district of Lạng Sơn province in the Northeast region of Vietnam. As of 2003, the district had a population of 75,980. The district covers an area of 644 km^{2}. The district capital lies at Cao Lộc.

== Administrative divisions ==
Cao Lộc, Đồng Đăng (site of the border crossing), Tân Thành, Xuân Long, Yên Trạch, Tân Liên, Gia Cát, Cống Sơn, Mẫu Sơn, Xuất Lễ, Cao Lâu, Hải Yến, Lộc Yên, Thanh Lòa, Hòa Cư, Hợp Thành, Thạch Đạn, Bảo Lâm, Thụy Hùng, Song Giáp, Phú Xá, Bình Trung, Hồng Phong.
