= Bố Trạch =

Coordinates: 17°38′N 106°25′E

- Commune and village
- Interactive map of Bố Trạch
- Country: Vietnam
- Province: Quảng Trị
- Time zone: UTC+07:00

Bố Trạch is a commune (xã) and village in Quảng Trị Province, in Vietnam. It is one of the 78 new wards, communes and special zones of the province following the reorganization in 2025.

On June 16, 2025, the Standing Committee of the National Assembly issued Resolution No. 1680/NQ-UBTVQH15 on the reorganization of commune-level administrative units in Quảng Trị Province in 2025. Accordingly, the entire natural area and population of Hưng Trạch Commune, Cự Nẫm Commune, Vạn Trạch Commune, and Phú Định Commune were reorganized to form a new commune named Bố Trạch Commune.
