= Đức Thọ =

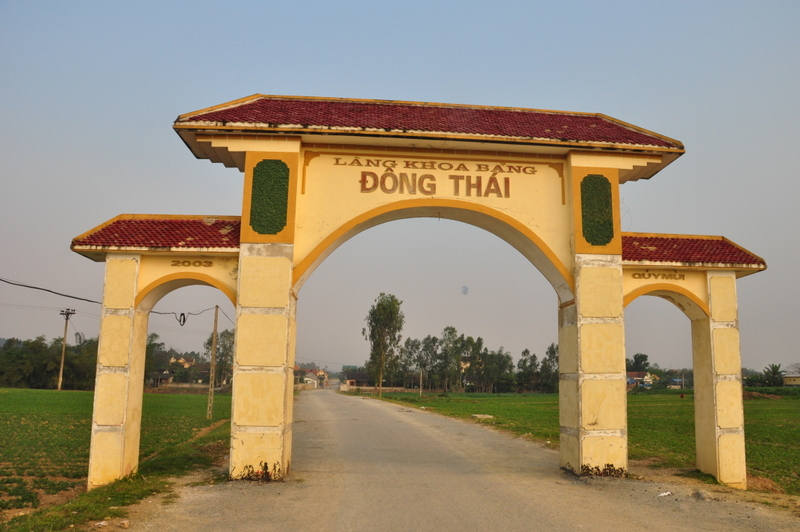
- Đông Thái village gate
- Interactive map of Đức Thọ
- Coordinates: 18.53562847779703°N 105.58636816556618°E
- Country: Vietnam
- Region: North Central Coast
- Province: Hà Tĩnh
- Established: 16 June 2025

Area
  - Total: 48.93 km^{2} (18.89 sq mi)

Population (31 December 2024)
  - Total: 40,064
  - Density: 819/km^{2} (2,120/sq mi)

Đức Thọ is a commune in Hà Tĩnh province, Vietnam.

On 16 June 2025, the Standing Committee of the National Assembly of Vietnam issued Resolution No. 1665/NQ-UBTVQH15. Under the resolution, the entire area and population of Đức Thọ township, Tùng Ảnh commune, Hòa Lạc commune, and Tân Dân commune were merged to form a new commune named Đức Thọ.
