= Nông Cống =

Nông Cống Xã Nông Cống
- Commune
- Nông Cống commune
- Location within Vietnam
- Coordinates: 19°37′29″N 105°38′56″E
- Country: Vietnam
- Region: North Central Coast
- Province: Thanh Hóa
- Time zone: UTC+7 (UTC + 7)

Nông Cống is a commune (xã) of Thanh Hóa Province, Vietnam.
