= Chi Lăng district =

Rural district in the Northeastern region of Vietnam

Coordinates: 21.667°N 106.667°E

Chi Lăng district Huyện Chi Lăng
- District
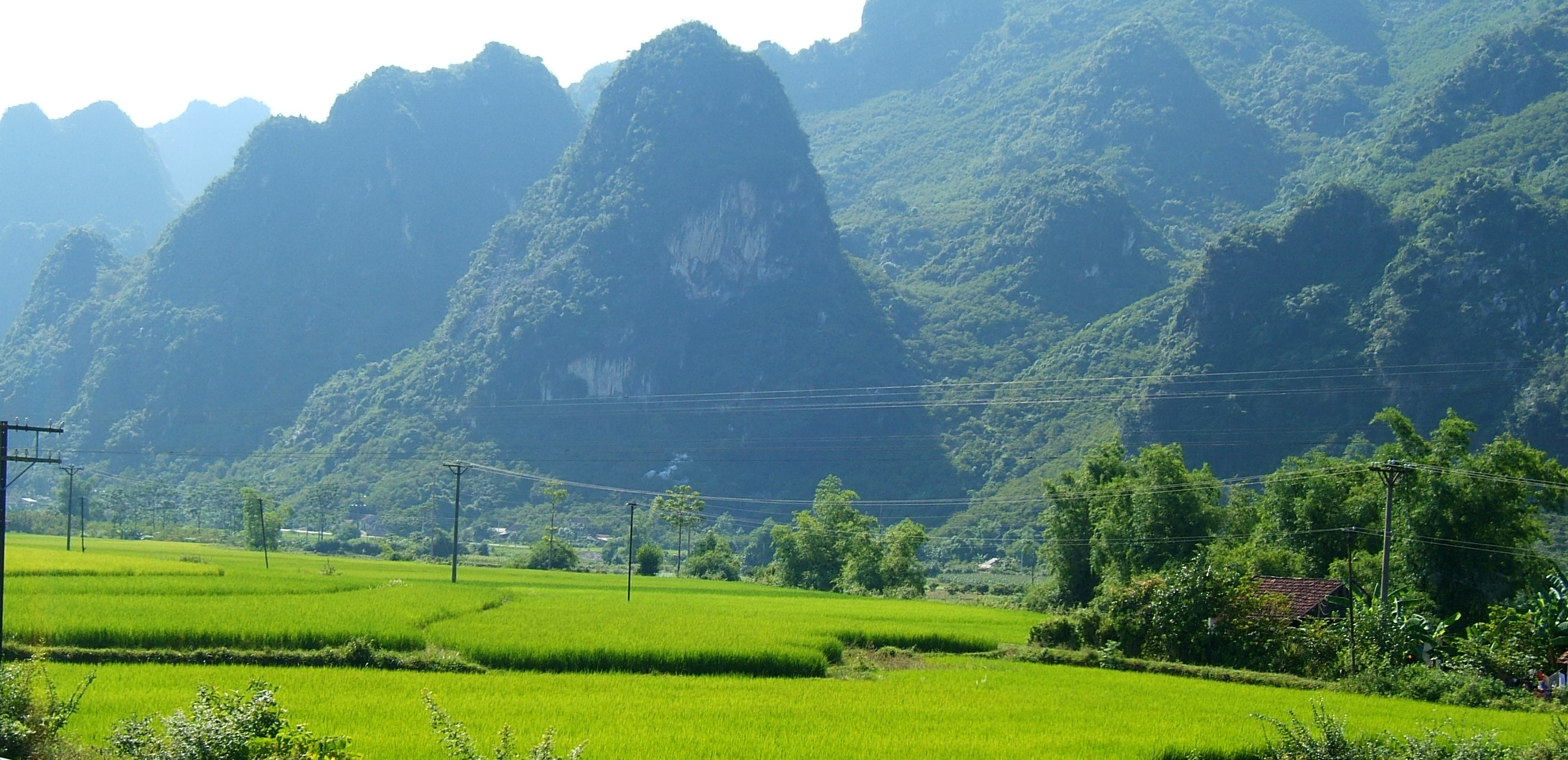
- Cai Kinh mountain range and Chi Lăng fields
- Interactive map of Chi Lăng district
- Country: Vietnam
- Region: Northeast
- Province: Lạng Sơn
- Capital: Đồng Mỏ

Area
  - Total: 271 sq mi (703 km^{2})

Population (2003)
  - Total: 77,910
- Time zone: UTC+7 (Indochina Time)

Chi Lăng is a former rural district of Lạng Sơn province in the Northeastern region of Vietnam. It is famous for many decisive battles at Chi Lăng pass in which the Vietnamese defeated the Chinese invaders.

As of 2003, the district had a population of 77,910. The district covers an area of 703 km^{2}. The district capital lies at Đồng Mỏ.

Chi Lăng pass was the site of many battles between feudal Vietnam and northern armies. Lý Thường Kiệt, Trần Hưng Đạo and Lê Lợi were among the army leaders that won battles in the district. Nowadays, many streets and places across Vietnam are named after the Chi Lăng pass, most notably the Chi Lăng Stadium in Đà Nẵng and Chi Lăng Park in Ho Chi Minh City.

== Geography ==
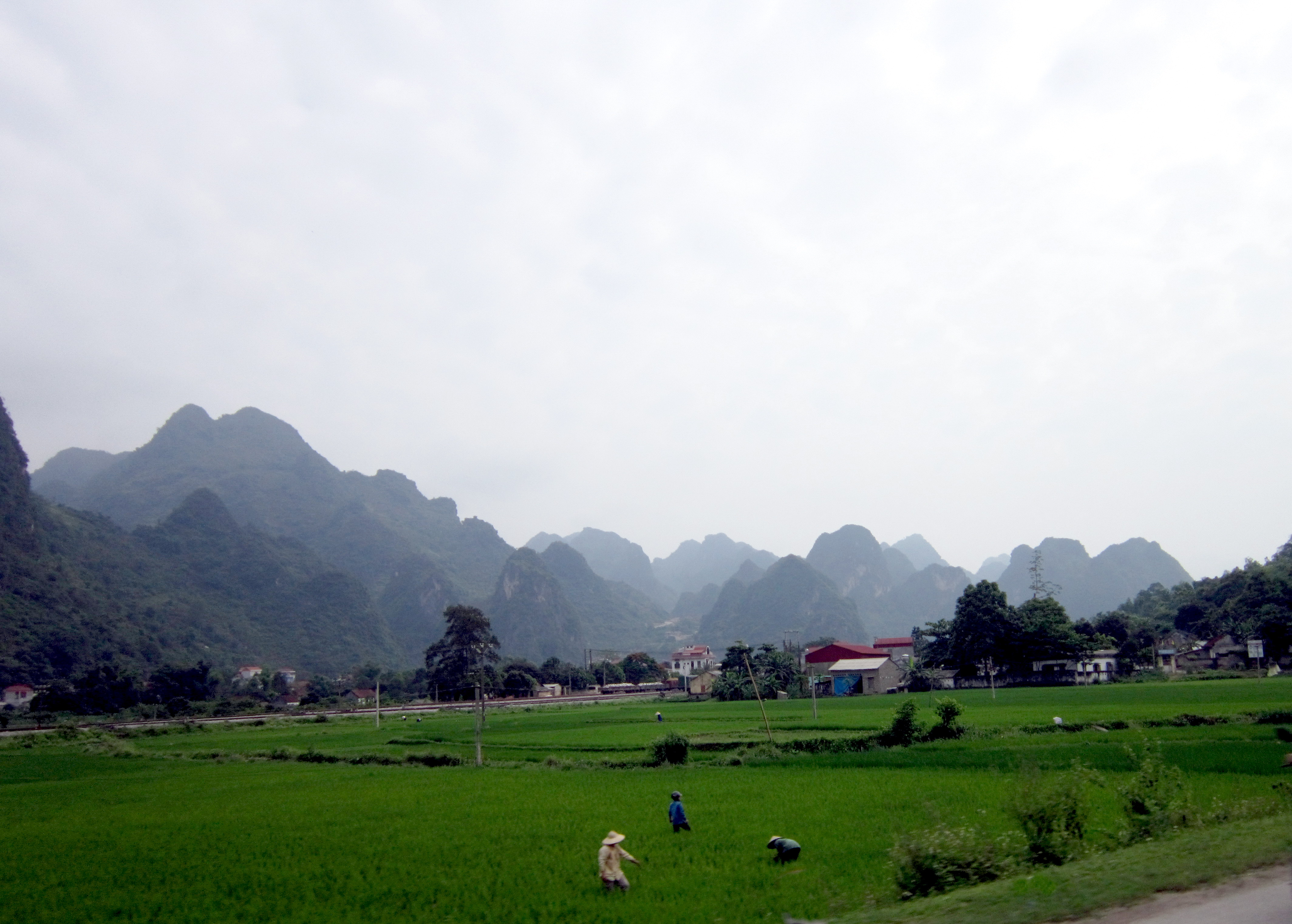
Rice field at Chi Lăng Pass

Chi Lang district is located in the south of Lạng Sơn province, 106 km from Hà Nội city, 35 km from Lạng Sơn city, with the geographical location:

- East: borders Lộc Bình district
- North: borders Cao Lộc, Văn Quan districts and Lạng Sơn city
- West: border with Văn Quan district
- Southwest: borders Hữu Lũng district
- South: borders Lục Ngạn district, Bắc Giang province.

Chi Lăng district has an area of 707.45 km^{2}, and the population in 2019 is 75,063. The district capital is Dồng Mỏ town, located on the National Route 1.

Chi Lăng is a mountainous district, with the famous Chi Lang pass. Chi Lang topography is divided by many hills, rivers and streams, the topography gradually slopes from the northeast to the southwest, the slope is quite large, especially the communes located along the Huu Kien massif. The highest place in the east of the district is also the border between Lộc Bình district, Lạng Sơn province and Lục Ngạn district, Bắc Giang province with the highest peak of 975 m, the lowest place is in the south of the district with an altitude of 35m, in Chi Lang town.

Chi Lăng district has the main river upstream of Thương River. Thương River originates from the high mountainous Na Pha Phuoc 600 m high, belongs to Bắc Thủy commune at the top northeast of Chi Lăng district. The river flows in the northeast-southwest direction, down to Hữu Lũng district to join the Trung river. (There are documents that consider the Trung River to be the main branch of the Thuong River, originating in the mountainous southeast of Vo Nhai district, Thai Nguyen province, flowing into Hữu Lũng district, confluence with the river branch flowing from Chi Lăng district).

Chi Lăng is located in the transitional position between the wet and rainy sub-region in the west, the cold sub-region with little rainfall in the east, and is influenced by the northern mountainous climate. Average annual temperature 22.7 °C annual average rainfall is 1,379mm. In 2019, the average population of Chi Lang is 75,063 people, accounting for 9.6% of the population of the whole province, the average population density is 106 people / km^{2}, higher than the average of the province, with many different ethnic groups. live. Nearly 74% of the population lives in rural areas and in agricultural production, urban population about 26%

== Administrative divisions ==
The district consists of two towns: Đồng Mỏ and Chi Lăng, and 18 communes: Bắc Thủy, Bằng Hữu, Bằng Mạc, Chi Lăng, Chiến Thắng, Gia Lộc, Hòa Bình, Hữu Kiên, Lâm Sơn, Liên Sơn, Mai Sao, Nhân Lý, Quan Sơn, Thượng Cường, Vân An, Vạn Linh, Vân Thủy and Y Tịch.
