= Thạch Hà =

- Lý Tự Trọng Park
- Interactive map of Thạch Hà
- Coordinates: 18°22′5″N 105°51′39″E
- Country: Vietnam
- Region: North Central Coast
- Province: Hà Tĩnh
- Established: 1 July 2025

Area
  - Total: 31.18 km^{2} (12.04 sq mi)

Population (31 December 2024)
  - Total: 31,220
  - Density: 1,001/km^{2} (2,590/sq mi)
- Postal code: 45206

Thạch Hà is a commune in Hà Tĩnh province, Vietnam, established as part of the 2025 administrative reorganization.

On 16 June 2025, the Standing Committee of the National Assembly of Vietnam issued Resolution No. 1665/NQ-UBTVQH15 on the arrangement of commune-level administrative units in Hà Tĩnh province in 2025. Under the resolution, the entire area and population of Thạch Hà township, Thạch Long commune, and Thạch Sơn commune were merged to form a new commune named Thạch Hà.
