= Bắc Giang =

Ward and capital of Bắc Ninh city, Vietnam

Coordinates: 21°17′N 106°14′E

- Ward
- Interactive map of Bắc Giang
- Country: Vietnam
- City: Bắc Ninh
- Time zone: UTC+07:00 (Indochina Time)

Bắc Giang is a ward (phường) of Bắc Ninh city, Vietnam. It is the capital of Bắc Ninh city.

On June 16, 2025, the Standing Committee of the National Assembly issued Resolution No. 1658/NQ-UBTVQH15 on reorganizing the entire natural area and population of the wards Dĩnh Kế, Hoàng Văn Thụ, Lê Lợi, Ngô Quyền, Thọ Xương, Trần Nguyên Hãn, Trần Phú, Xương Giang, and Dĩnh Trì Commune into a new ward named Bắc Giang Ward.
