= Lạng Sơn (city) =

- Provincial city (Class-3)
- Lang Sơn City; Thành phố Lạng Sơn
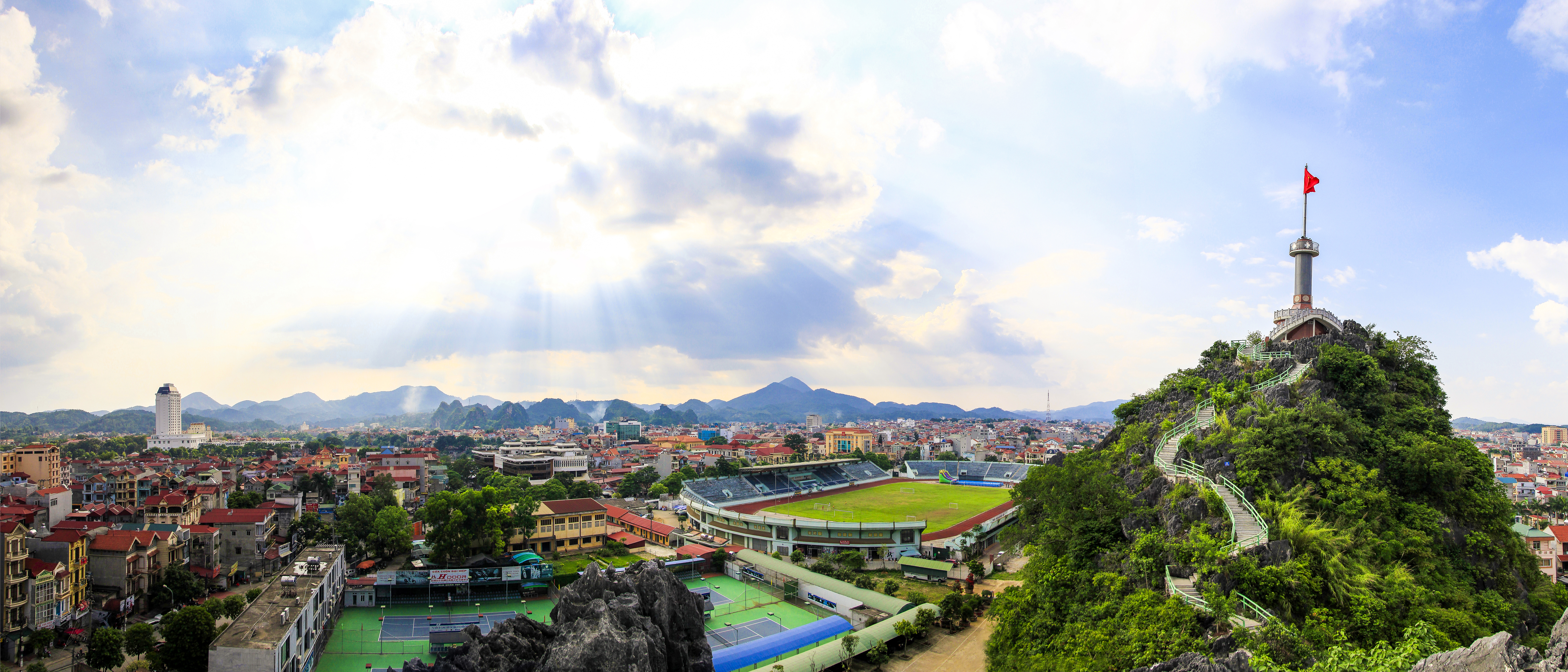
- A corner of Lạng Sơn city

- Seal
- Interactive map of Lạng Sơn
- Location in Vietnam Lạng Sơn (Southeast Asia) Lạng Sơn (Asia)
- Coordinates: 21°50′52″N 106°45′28″E
- Country: Vietnam
- Province: Lạng Sơn Province
- Founded: November 1, 2002

Government
  - Chairman of the People's Council: Phạm Đức Huân
  - Chairman of the People's Committee: Lê Trí Thức

Area
  - Provincial city (Class-3): 79 km^{2} (31 sq mi)

Population (2019)
  - Provincial city (Class-3): 200,108
  - Density: 1,371/km^{2} (3,550/sq mi)
  - Urban: 77,275
  - Ethnicities: Kinh Tày Nùng Hoa Dao Mường Sán Dìu Sán Chỉ...
- Climate: Cfa
- Website: thanhpho.langson.gov.vn

Lạng Sơn is a former city in far Northern Vietnam, and the capital of Lạng Sơn Province. It is accessible by road and rail from Hanoi, the Vietnamese capital, and it is the northernmost point on National Route 1.

== History ==
Due to its geography as Vietnam's gateway to China (being located just across from Guangxi), Lạng Sơn (諒山) and its ancient citadel have been in the path of many invasions, and were the site of three French defeats during the colonial era. Occupied by Qing forces during the military buildup that preceded the Sino-French War, the city was occupied by France after the two-week Lạng Sơn Campaign in February 1885. However, the French brigade there conducted a hasty retreat after launching a failed attack at the Battle of Bang Bo into China; the "retreat from Lạng Sơn" became the most controversial aspect of the war and led to the fall of Jules Ferry's ministry. Outnumbered French colonial forces clashed with the Japanese 5th Division in the Battle of Lạng Sơn during the Japanese Vietnam Expedition on 22 September 1940. The French were again compelled to retreat hastily. In 1945 it was again the scene of heavy fighting during the Japanese coup d'état in French Indochina.

After the end of the Pacific War, the French colonial army established a permanent garrison there, which served as the logistics hub for the French border fortresses. It was evacuated in 1950 during Võ Nguyên Giáp's offensive against the French border forts, considered a turning point in the Indochina War. The city was the center of fighting during the Sino-Vietnamese War of 1979, and fell to the Chinese military who briefly occupied it.

== Geology and climate ==
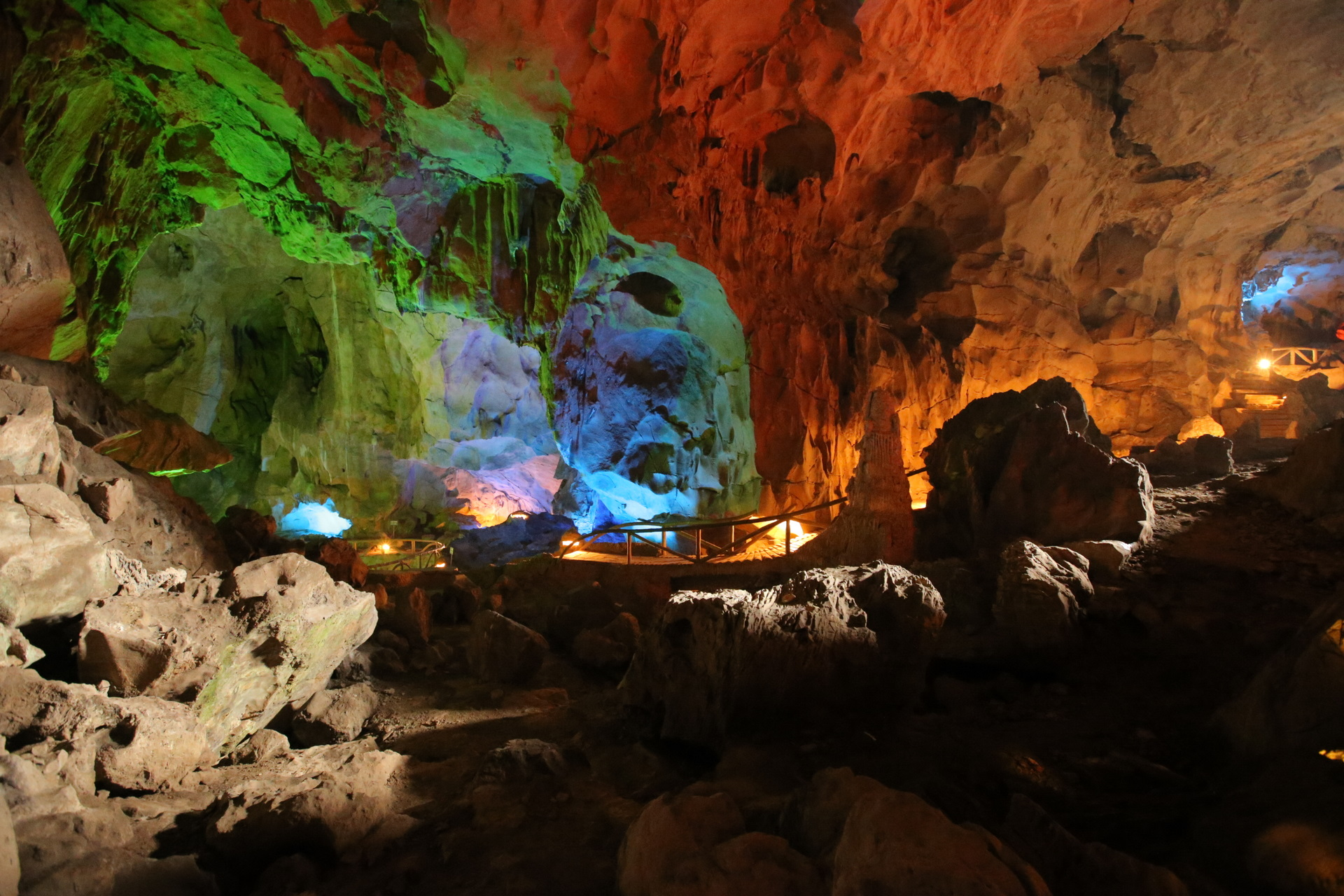
Tam Thanh cave

The surface rocks in the area are a Permian limestone, overlain by the early Triassic Lang Son Formation, consisting of flyschoid beds with interbedded sandstones, siltstones and clay shales and some felsic volcanics. This place even can experience snow in the coldest moments of winter although Vietnam is basically snow free, it and the whole of Northern Vietnam is in an area of the subtropical climate.

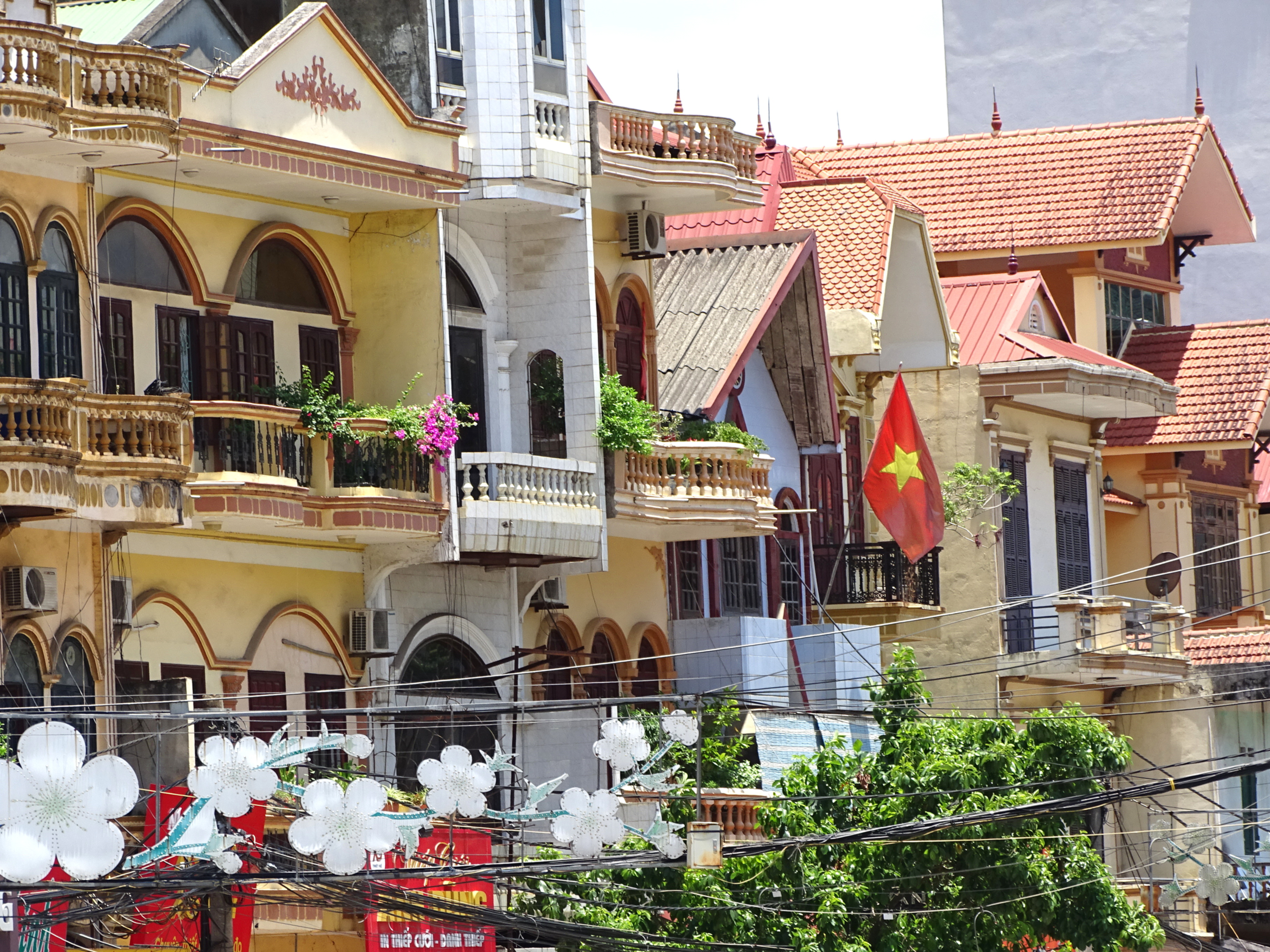
Street view in Lạng Sơn

Under the Köppen climate classification, Lạng Sơn has a humid subtropical climate (Cfa). It had been snowed in the city on 24 January 2016.

Climate data for Lạng Sơn
Month	Jan	Feb	Mar	Apr	May	Jun	Jul	Aug	Sep	Oct	Nov	Dec	Year
Record high °C (°F)	31.6 (88.9)	36.4 (97.5)	36.7 (98.1)	38.6 (101.5)	39.8 (103.6)	38.8 (101.8)	38.5 (101.3)	37.7 (99.9)	36.6 (97.9)	35.2 (95.4)	33.0 (91.4)	32.2 (90.0)	39.8 (103.6)
Mean daily maximum °C (°F)	17.5 (63.5)	18.8 (65.8)	21.9 (71.4)	26.5 (79.7)	30.2 (86.4)	31.5 (88.7)	31.7 (89.1)	31.3 (88.3)	30.2 (86.4)	27.5 (81.5)	23.7 (74.7)	19.8 (67.6)	25.9 (78.6)
Daily mean °C (°F)	13.1 (55.6)	14.7 (58.5)	18.0 (64.4)	22.3 (72.1)	25.5 (77.9)	26.9 (80.4)	27.1 (80.8)	26.6 (79.9)	25.2 (77.4)	22.3 (72.1)	18.4 (65.1)	14.6 (58.3)	21.3 (70.3)
Mean daily minimum °C (°F)	10.1 (50.2)	12.0 (53.6)	15.4 (59.7)	19.3 (66.7)	22.1 (71.8)	23.8 (74.8)	24.0 (75.2)	23.7 (74.7)	22.2 (72.0)	18.8 (65.8)	14.8 (58.6)	11.0 (51.8)	18.1 (64.6)
Record low °C (°F)	−2.1 (28.2)	−1.7 (28.9)	0.9 (33.6)	6.2 (43.2)	11.1 (52.0)	15.1 (59.2)	18.6 (65.5)	17.0 (62.6)	13.2 (55.8)	5.5 (41.9)	1.7 (35.1)	−1.5 (29.3)	−2.1 (28.2)
Average rainfall mm (inches)	35.4 (1.39)	33.3 (1.31)	50.3 (1.98)	91.1 (3.59)	159.4 (6.28)	191.3 (7.53)	236.0 (9.29)	227.6 (8.96)	141.8 (5.58)	78.9 (3.11)	41.4 (1.63)	24.2 (0.95)	1,318.2 (51.90)
Average rainy days	9.3	10.0	13.2	12.5	13.5	15.6	16.6	17.2	12.4	8.6	6.5	5.9	141.3
Average relative humidity (%)	80.4	82.5	83.6	82.7	81.6	83.6	84.2	85.9	84.7	82.0	80.0	78.0	82.5
Mean monthly sunshine hours	74.5	59.2	59.2	98.1	171.2	161.4	180.2	171.3	174.4	157.5	136.3	115.5	1,561.4
Source 1: Vietnam Institute for Building Science and Technology
Source 2: The Yearbook of Indochina (1932-1933)

=== Topography and geology ===
The city has diverse topographical and geological features, including hill, mountainous, half mountainous, coastal plains and coastal sand dunes.

The hilly region is in the west, stretching from north to south (in parts of communes: Dong Son, Thuan Duc) with an average elevation of 12–15 m, with total area of 64.93 km^{2}, 41.7% of the city total area. Residents here live on agriculture, forestry, farming. The soil in this area is poor in nutrition, infertile and subject to continuous erosion due to its slope of 7-10%.

The half hilly region surrounds a plain with an average elevation of 10 m from north-east - north to north-west – south-west and south – south-east. This region covers communes and wards of Bắc Lý, Nam Lý, Nghĩa Ninh, Bắc Nghĩa, Đức Ninh, Đức Ninh Đông, Lộc Ninh and Phú Hải with total area of 62.87 km^{2}, or accounts for 40.2% of the city total area. Residents here lives on industrial, handcraft, trading and a small percentage lives on farming. This region is not very fertile, subject to alum. However, thanks to the heavy distribution of rivers and lakes, ponds and pools, it's better for agriculture than the hilly region. The plain with the average of 2.1 m, with little slope, accounting for 0.2% of the city area (5.76 km^{2}). Most of the city's commercial, administrative and main streets concentrate in this narrow regions. Coastal sand dune area is on the east of the city, with an area of 21.98 km^{2}, making up 14.3% of the total area.

== Gallery ==
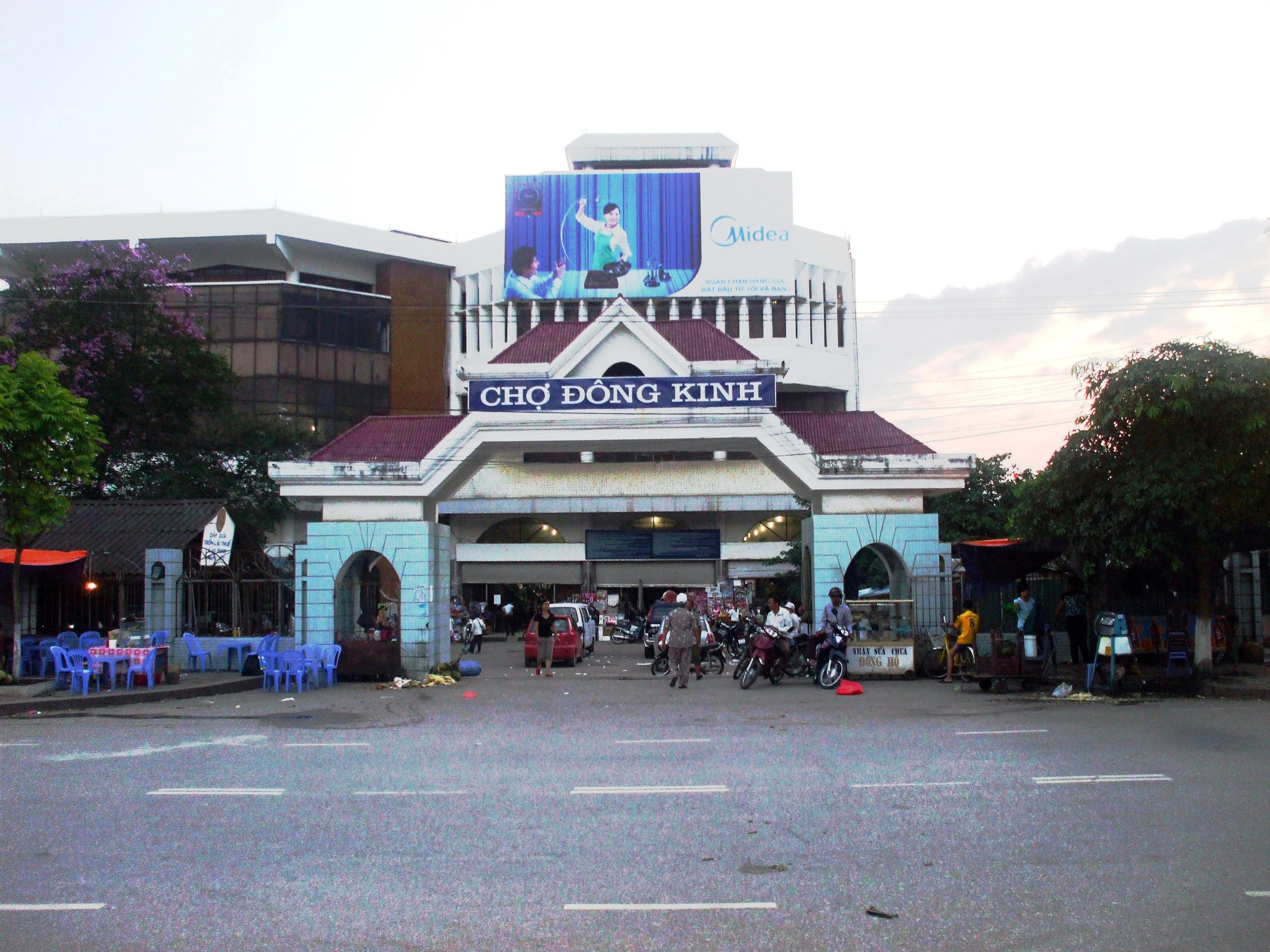
Đông Kinh market of Lạng Sơn city.

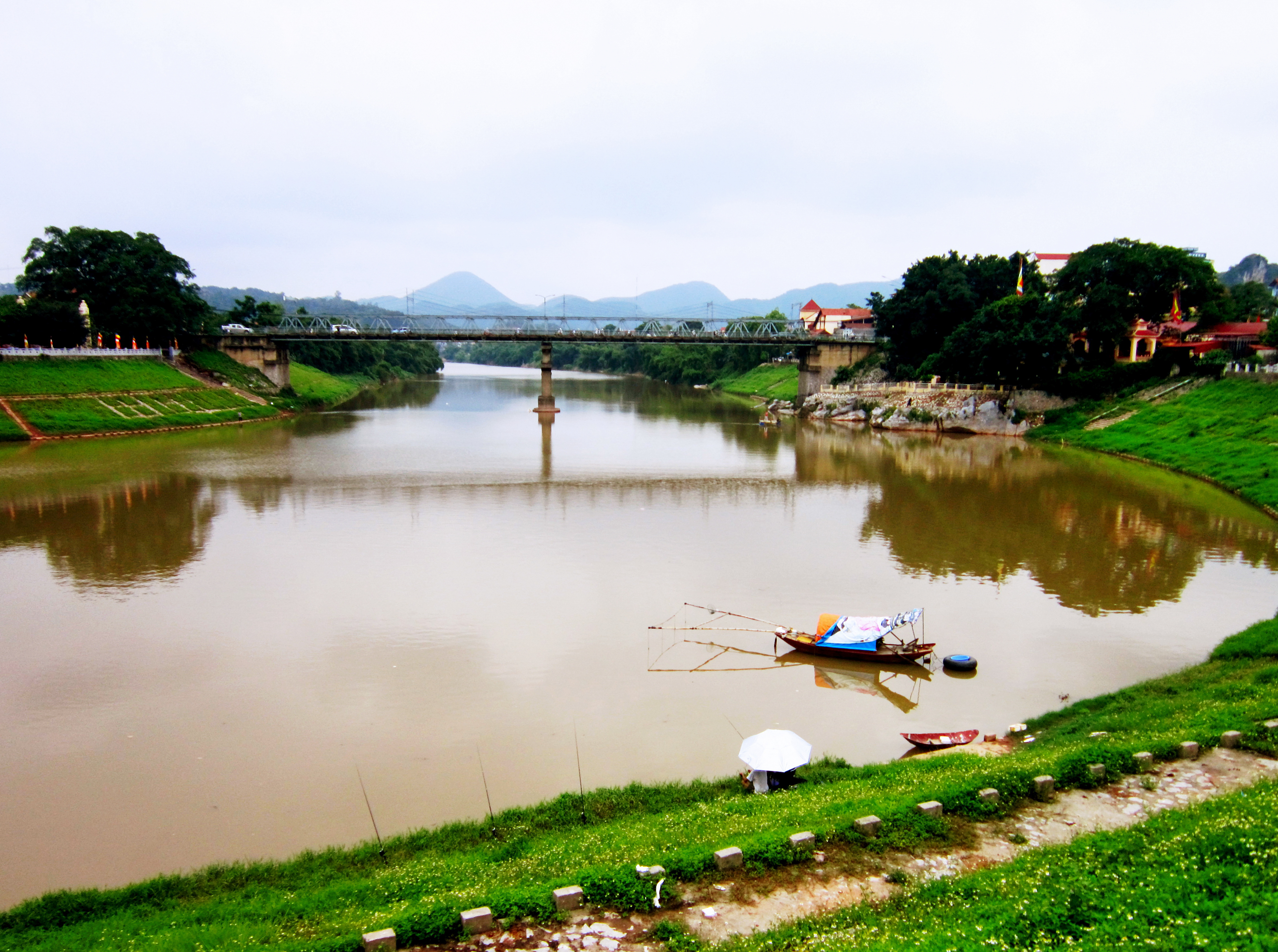
Kỳ Lừa Bridge spans across Kỳ Cùng River

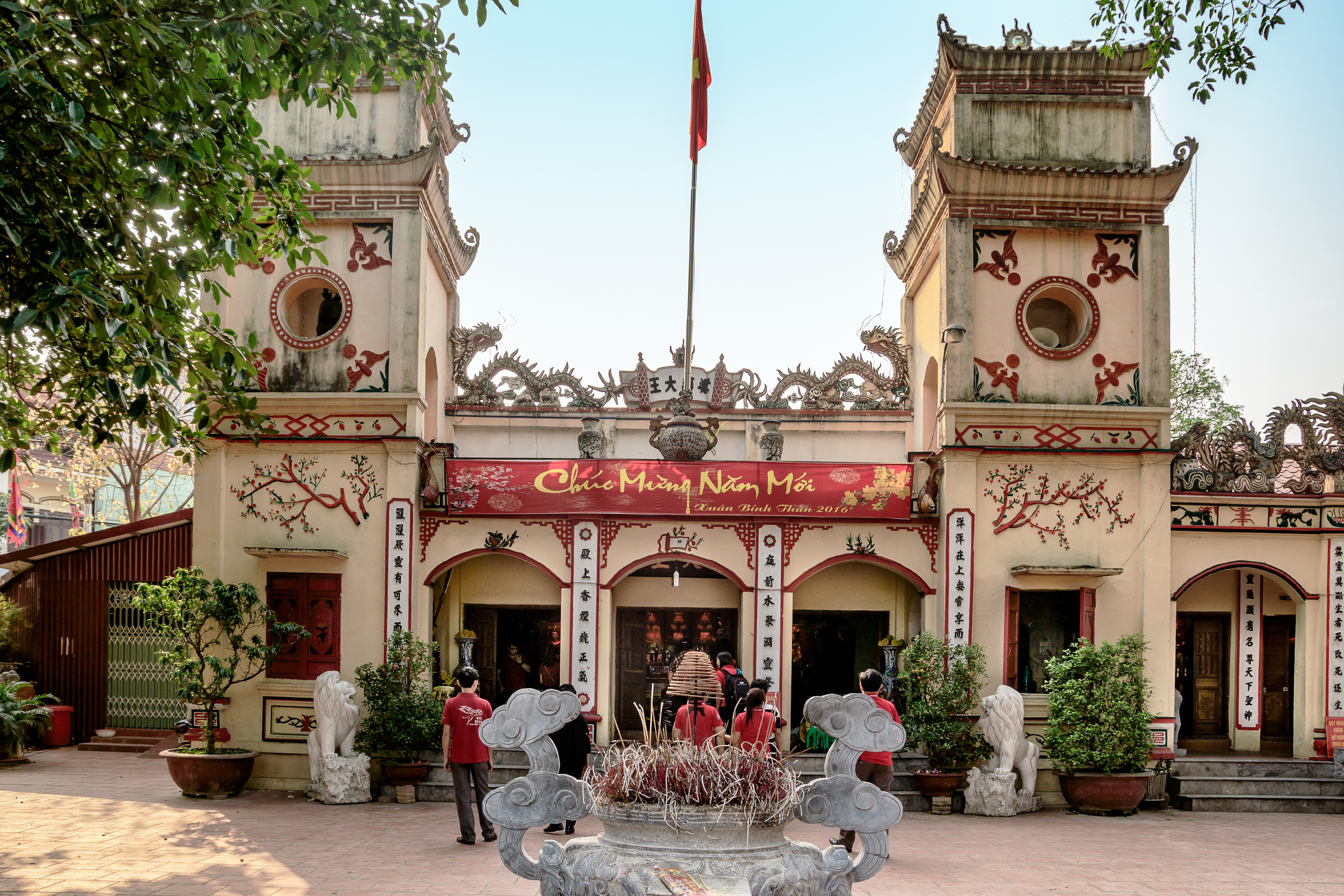
Kỳ Cùng Temple (also known as Quan Lớn Tuần Tranh Temple)

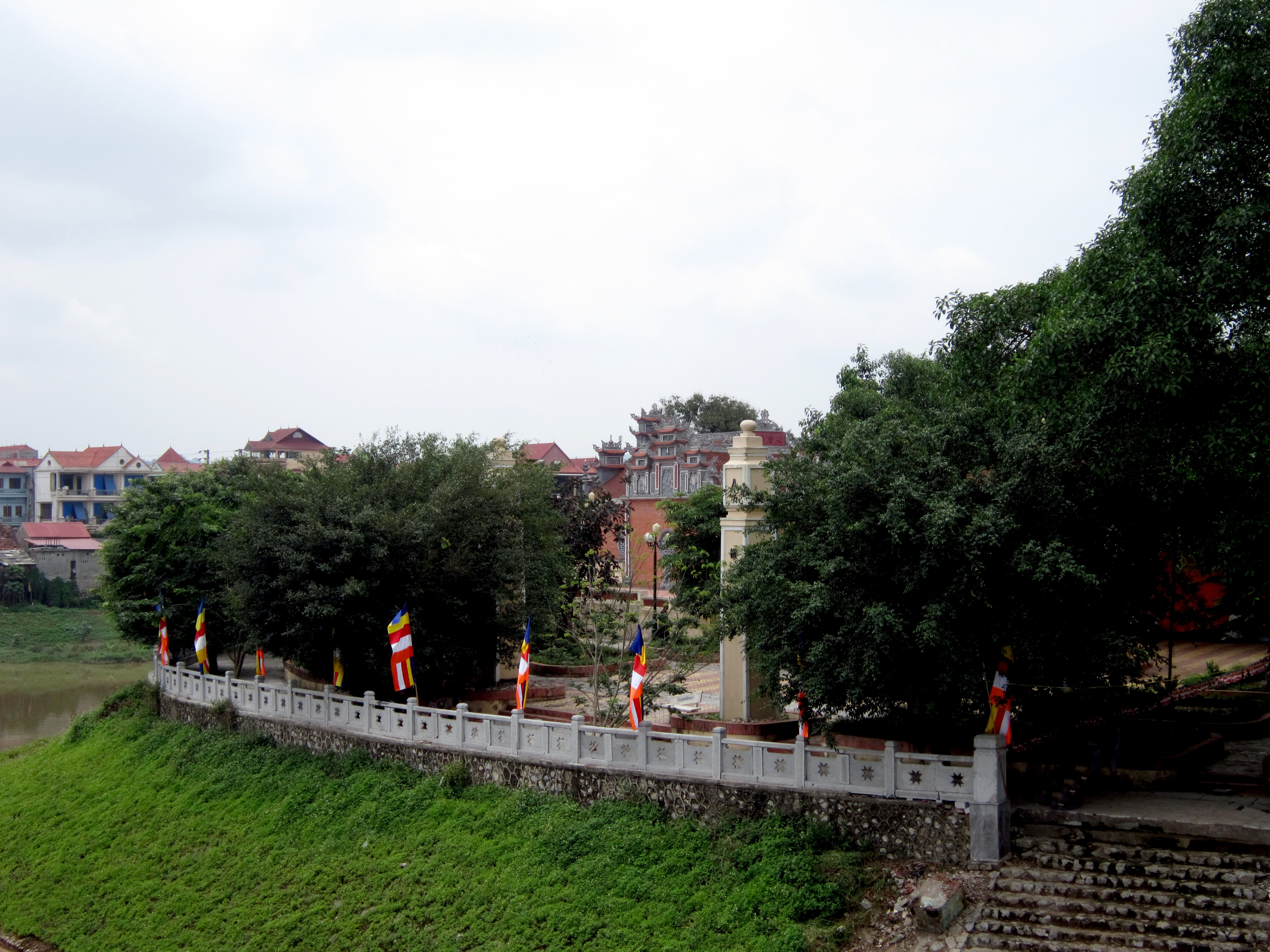
Kỳ Cùng stone wharf belongs to Lạng Sơn city. In 1993, the temple was recognized as a national monument.

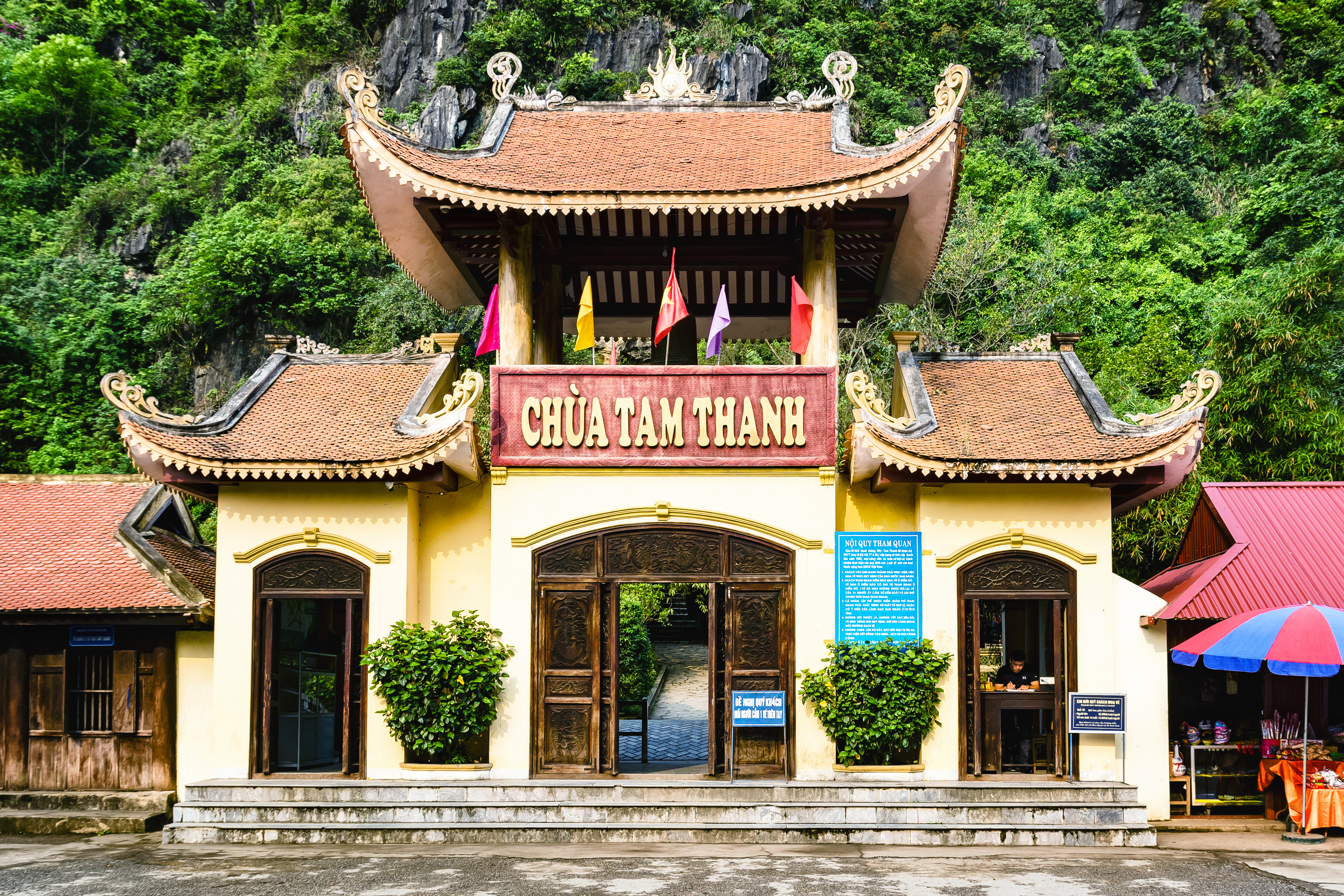
Tam Thanh Pagoda

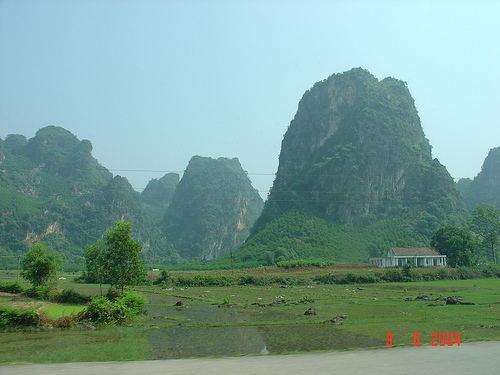
Hilly area.

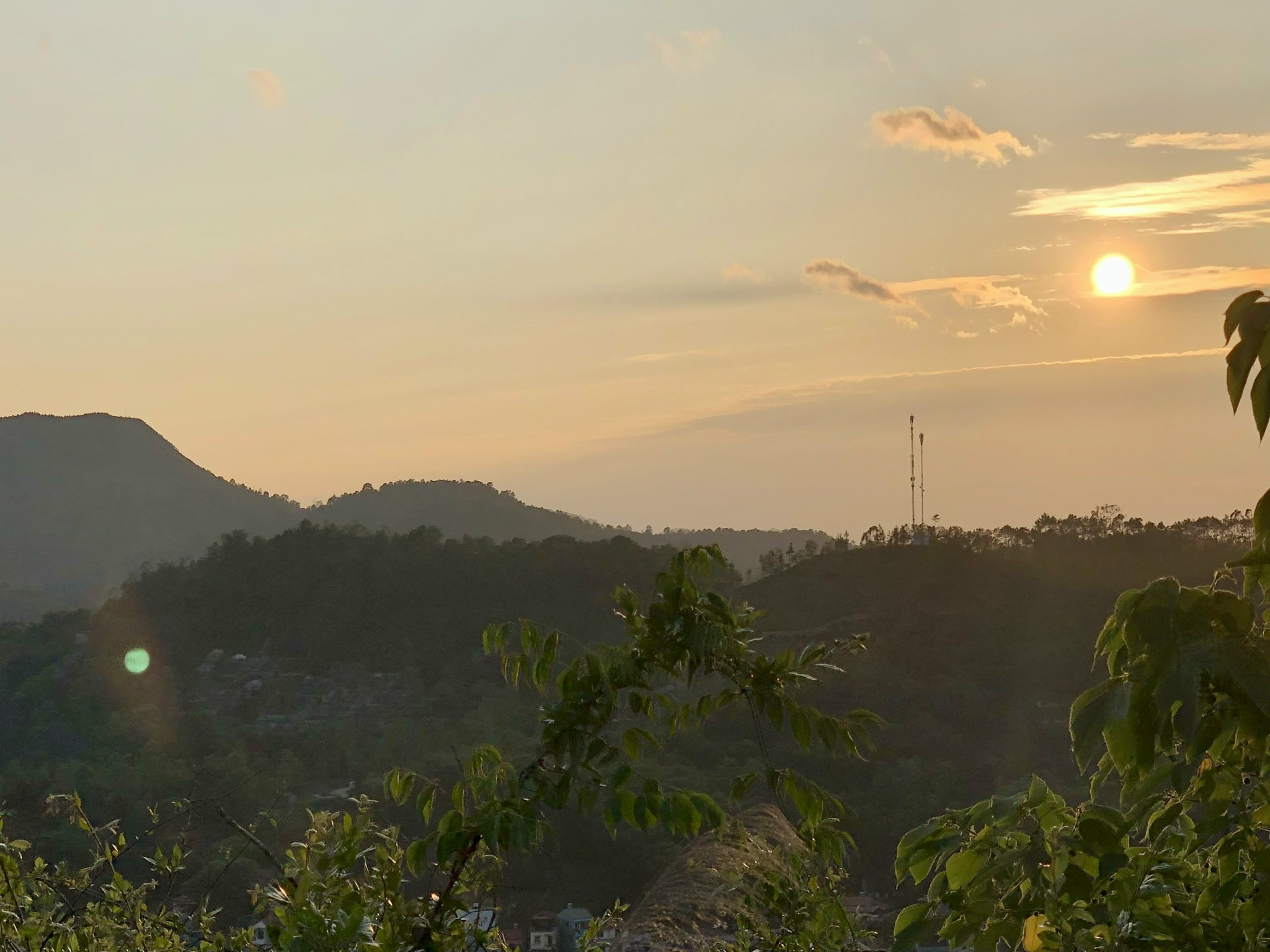
Lạng Sơn hills and mountains viewed from Mạc citadel.

== See also ==
- Pingxiang
