= Cao Lộc =

Cao Lộc Xã Cao Lộc
- Commune
- Location in Vietnam
- Coordinates: 21°52′01″N 106°46′05″E
- Country: Vietnam
- Region: Northeast
- Province: Lạng Sơn
- Established: July 1st 2025

Area
  - Total: 40.10 sq mi (103.86 km^{2})

Population (2024)
  - Total: 6,920
  - Density: 173/sq mi (66.6/km^{2})
- Time zone: UTC+07:00
- Administrative code: 06199

Cao Lộc is a commune (xã) of Lạng Sơn Province, Vietnam.

On July 1, 2025, the Standing Committee of the National Assembly issued Resolution No. 1672/NQ-UBTVQH15 on the reorganization of commune-level administrative units in Lạng Sơn Province in 2025. Accordingly, the entire natural area and population of Lộc Yên Commune, Thanh Lòa Commune, and Thạch Đạn Commune were reorganized to form a new commune named Cao Lộc Commune.
