= National Route 1 (Vietnam) =

Major north–south highway in Vietnam

National Route 1
- Quốc lộ 1

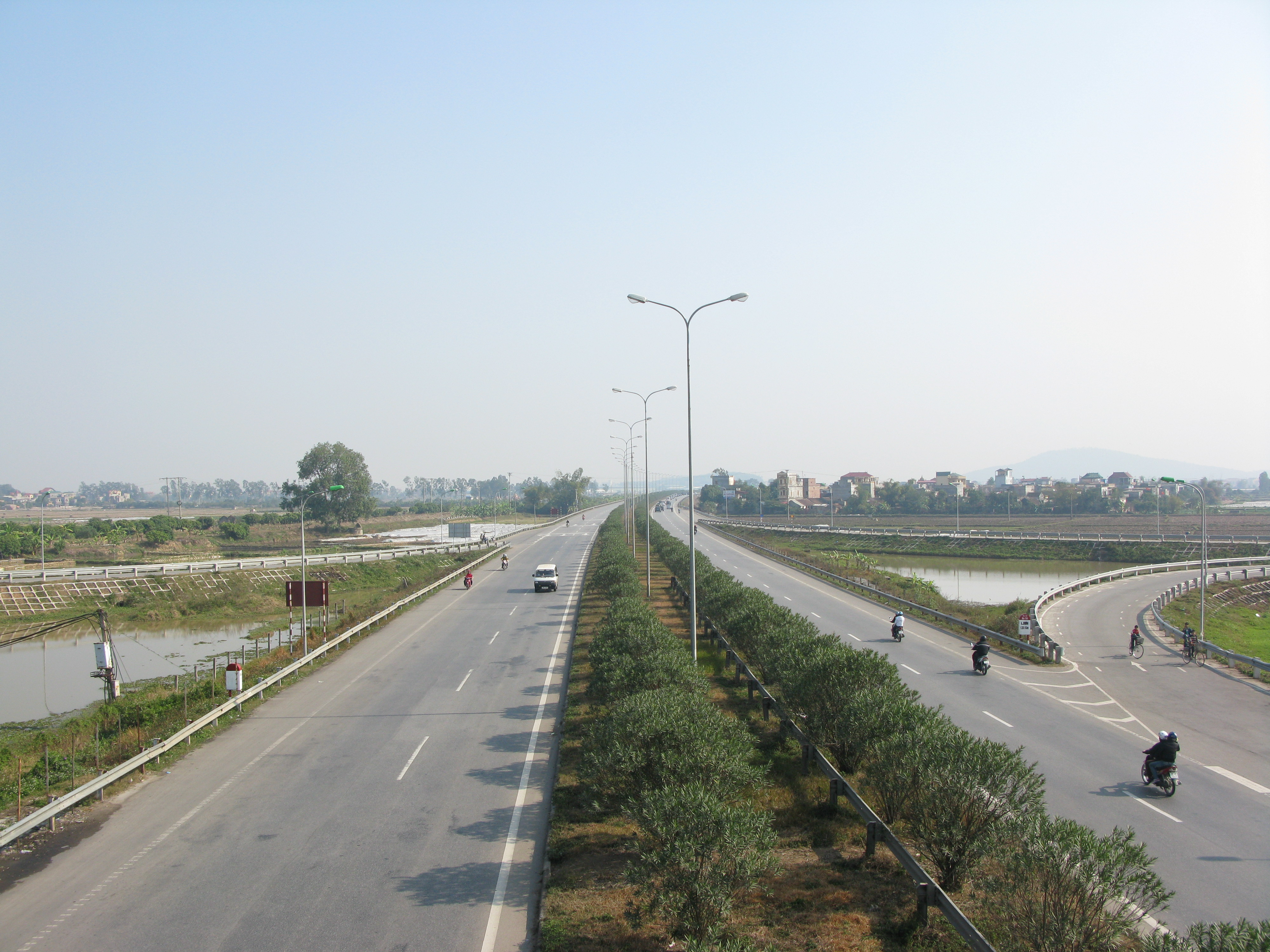
- National Route 1 (CT.01) near Từ Sơn, Bắc Ninh province

Route information
- Part of AH1
- Length: 2,482 km (1,542 mi)
- Existed: Early 20th century–present

Major junctions
- North end: G322 at Hữu Nghị Quan Border Gate, Chinese border
- South end: Năm Căn commune, Cà Mau province

Location
- Country: Vietnam

Highway system
- Transport in Vietnam
← QL 281	→ QL 1B

National Route 1 (Vietnamese: Quốc lộ 1 (or abbrv. QL.1) or Đường 1), also known as National Route 1A, is the trans-Vietnam highway. The route begins at km 0 at Hữu Nghị Quan Border Gate near the China-Vietnam border, runs the length of the country connecting major cities including Hanoi, Đà Nẵng, Hồ Chí Minh City, Cần Thơ, and ends at km 2482 at Năm Căn commune in Cà Mau province.

== Route Info ==
National Route 1 passes through 22 provinces and cities with the following key junctions:

- Hữu Nghị Quan Border Gate (km 0, Lạng Sơn province)
- Đông Kinh ward (km 16, Lạng Sơn province)
- Bắc Giang ward (km 119, Bắc Ninh province)
- Võ Cường ward (km 139, Bắc Ninh province)
- Hanoi city (km 170)
- Phủ Lý ward (km 229, Ninh Bình province)
- Hoa Lư ward (km 263, Ninh Bình province)
- Quang Trung ward (km 280, Thanh Hóa province)
- Hạc Thành ward (km 323, Thanh Hoá province)
- Thành Vinh ward (km 461, Nghệ An province)
- Thành Sen ward (km 510, Hà Tĩnh province)
- Vũng Áng ward (km 581, Hà Tĩnh province)
- Đồng Hới ward (km 658, Quảng Trị province)
- Đông Hà ward (km 750, Quảng Trị province)
- Huế city (km 825)
- Đà Nẵng city (km 929)
- Tam Kỳ ward (km 991, Đà Nẵng city)
- Cẩm Thành ward (km 1054, Quảng Ngãi province)
- Quy Nhơn ward (km 1232, Gia Lai province)
- Tuy Hoà ward (km 1329, Đắk Lắk province)
- Nha Trang ward (km 1450, Khánh Hoà province)
- Cam Ranh ward (km 1507, Khánh Hoà province)
- Phan Rang ward (km 1555, Khánh Hoà province)
- Phan Thiết ward (km 1701, Lâm Đồng province)
- Long Khánh ward (km 1819, Đồng Nai province)
- Biên Hoà ward (km 1867, Đồng Nai province)
- Dĩ An ward (km 1879, Hồ Chí Minh city)
- Hồ Chí Minh city (km 1889)
- Long An ward (km 1924, Tây Ninh province)
- Mỹ Tho ward (km 1954, Đồng Tháp province)
- Long Châu ward (km 2029, Vĩnh Long province)
- Cần Thơ city (km 2068)
- Ngã Bảy ward (km 2096, Cần Thơ city)
- Sóc Trăng ward (km 2127, Cần Thơ city)
- Bạc Liêu ward (km 2193, Cà Mau province)
- Tân Thành ward (km 2239, Cà Mau province)

Length of National Route 1 passing through the provinces/cities of Vietnam
No.	Province/City	Km	Length (km)	Ranking
1	Lạng Sơn	16	94,5	14
2	Bắc Ninh	119	57,7	18
3	Hà Nội	170	55,3	19
4	Ninh Bình	263	69	17
5	Thanh Hóa	323	109,8	10
6	Nghệ An	461	91,3	15
7	Hà Tĩnh	510	126,9	5
8	Quảng Trị	658	197,4	2
9	Huế	824	118,4	8
10	Đà Nẵng	929	123,9	6
11	Quảng Ngãi	1054	98,0	13
12	Gia Lai	1232	118,3	9
13	Đắk Lắk	1329	123,2	7
14	Khánh Hòa	1450	222,8	1
15	Lâm Đồng	1701	181,4	4
16	Đồng Nai	1867	98,7	12
17	Thành phố Hồ Chí Minh	1889	52,5	20
18	Tây Ninh	1924	30,8	22
19	Đồng Tháp	1954	72,8	16
20	Vĩnh Long	2029	38,7	21
21	Cần Thơ	2068	99	11
22	Cà Mau	2236	184,8	3

== Specifications ==
- Total length 2482 km
- Road width: 21 m
- Road surface: paved with asphalt
- Total bridges: 874 bridges, bridge load varies from 25 to 30 metric tonnes

== History ==
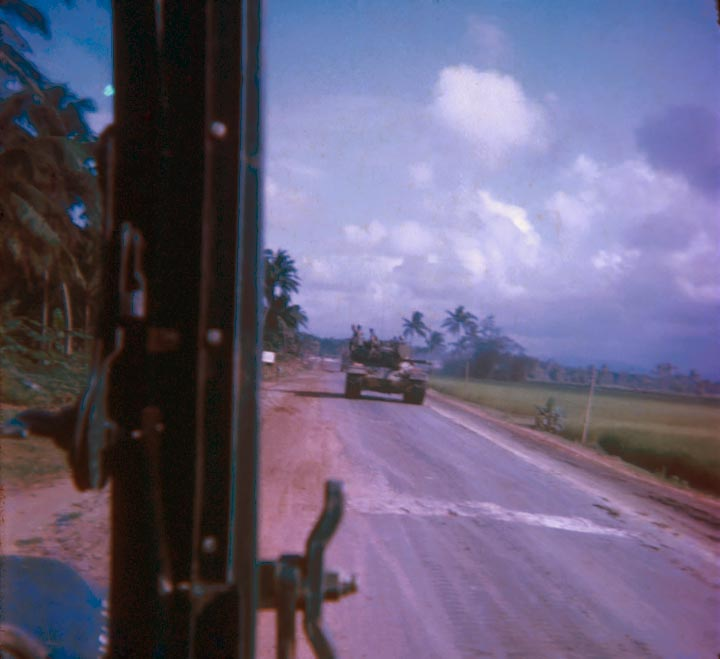
The highway circa 1968

The National Route 1 was constructed by the French colonists in early 20th century. During both the First Indochina War and Second Indochina War (the Vietnam War), Road 1A was the site of a number of battles between Vietnamese forces and French or American troops. One of the most notable engagements was the French Operation Camargue in 1953.

During the South Vietnam, there were two divided sections of the main highway from Quảng Trị to Ba Xuyên (Cà Mau): QL-1 (National Highway 1) and QL-4 (National Highway 4), both was connected by the Saigon Beltway. It bypassed Saigon and Biên Hòa. Extensive upgrade work was done by the U.S. Army Corps of Engineers during the 2nd Indo China War. In 1966 the 19th Engineer Battalion began to "upgrade highway QL-1 from virtually a dirt trail, to a class 31 all-weather road, from Qui Nhơn north to Bong Son." By 1970, the QL-1 had been upgraded all the way to Mo Duc.

The road was upgraded using official development assistance from Japan, and loans from the World Bank.

== Future ==
The central section of the highway, from Hữu Nghị Border Gate to Cà Mau, is planned to be duplicated by the North–South Expressway.
