= List of universities and colleges in Guangxi =

The following is List of universities and colleges in Guangxi, China.

== Public universities and colleges ==
Name	Chinese name	City	Founded
Guangxi University	广西大学	Nanning	1928
Guangxi Normal University	广西师范大学	Guilin	1932
Guangxi Minzu University	广西民族大学	Nanning	1952
Guilin University of Electronic Technology	桂林电子科技大学	Guilin	1960
Guilin University of Technology	桂林理工大学	Guilin	1956
Guangxi University of Chinese Medicine	广西中医药大学	Nanning	1956
Guilin Medical University	桂林医科大学	Guilin	1935
Guangxi Medical University	广西医科大学	Nanning	1934
Guangxi University of Science and Technology	广西科技大学	Liuzhou	1958
Nanning Normal University	南宁师范大学	Nanning	1953
Beibu Gulf University	北部湾大学	Qinzhou	1973
Guangxi Arts University	广西艺术学院	Nanning	1938
Youjiang Medical University for Nationalities	右江民族医学院	Baise	1958
Yulin Normal University	玉林师范学院	Yulin	1945
Hechi University	河池学院	Hechi	1951
Guangxi University of Finance and Economics	广西财经学院	Nanning	1960
Wuzhou University	梧州学院	Wuzhou	1985
Hezhou University	贺州学院	Hezhou	1943
Baise University	百色学院	Baise	1938
Guangxi Minzu Normal University	广西民族师范学院	Chongzuo	1939
Guilin University of Aerospace Technology	桂林航天工业学院	Guilin	1979
Guilin Tourism University	桂林旅游学院	Guilin	1985
Guangxi Science & Technology Normal University	广西科技师范学院	Laibin	1958
Guangxi Police College	广西警察学院	Nanning	1950
Guilin Normal College	桂林师范学院	Guilin	1938
Guangxi Technological University	广西工业学院	Beihai	2026

== Private universities and colleges ==
Name	Chinese name	City	Founded
Guilin College	桂林学院	Guilin	2001
Xiangsihu College of Guangxi Minzu University	广西民族大学相思湖学院	Nanning	2002
Guilin Institute of Information Technology	桂林信息科技学院	Guilin	2001
Nanning College of Technology	南宁理工学院	Nanning	2002
Faculty of Chinese Medicine Science, Guangxi University of Chinese Medicine	广西中医药大学赛恩斯新医药学院	Nanning	2002
Liuzhou Institute of Technology	柳州工学院	Liuzhou	2002
Shiyuan College of Nanning Normal University	南宁师范大学师园学院	Nanning	2002
Guangxi University of Foreign Languages	广西外国语学院	Nanning	2004
Nanning University	南宁学院	Nanning	1985
Beihai University of Art and Design	北海艺术设计学院	Beihai	2000

== Vocational and technical universities ==
Name	Chinese name	City	Founded
Guangxi Vocational Normal University	广西职业师范学院	Nanning	1951
Guangxi Vocational University of Agriculture	广西农业职业技术大学	Nanning	2021
Guangxi Polytechnic University	广西职业技术大学	Nanning	1965
Nanning Vocational and Technical University	南宁职业技术大学	Nanning	1984
Liuzhou Polytechnic University	柳州职业技术大学	Liuzhou	1998

== Open universities ==
Name	Chinese name	City	Founded
Guangxi Open University	广西开放大学	Nanning	1979

== See also ==
- List of universities in China
