= Andrew Thomas (composer) =

American composer (1939-2026)

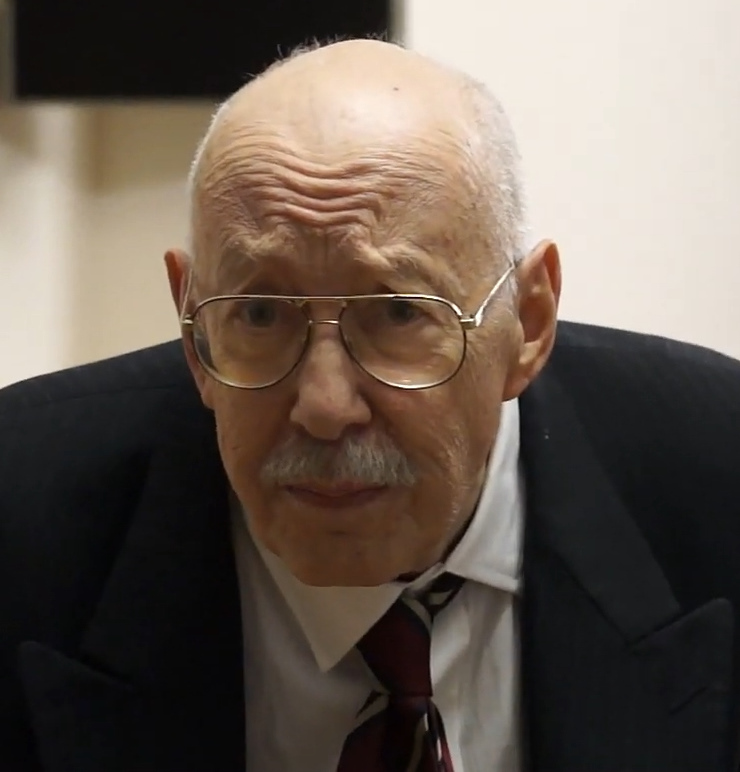
- Thomas in 2019

Background information
- Born: Andrew William Thomas; October 8, 1939; Ithaca, New York
- Died: April 19, 2026 (aged 86)
- Genres: Classical
- Occupation: Composer
- Instrument: Piano

Andrew William Thomas (October 8, 1939 - April 19, 2026) was an American composer.

He studied with Karel Husa at Cornell University, with Nadia Boulanger in Paris, and earned his M.M. and D.M.A. Degrees in Composition at the Juilliard School. At Juilliard he studied with Luciano Berio, Elliott Carter, and Otto Luening.

Dr. Thomas taught and served as chairman of the Composition Department in the Juilliard Pre-College Division from 1969 to 1994, and in 1994 he was appointed Director of the Pre-College Division at the Juilliard School. In addition to composing, Thomas performed as a pianist and conductor, and was a guest teacher, throughout the world. His awards included a grant from The National Endowment for the Arts and a Distinguished Teacher Citation from The White House Commission on Presidential Scholars.

== Career ==
Although he taught throughout the world, from 2000 on, Thomas was a regular guest of the People's Republic of China. Under the auspices of the Chinese government, Thomas performed his composition for solo piano, Music at Twilight, in Hong Kong and Guangzhou. He was the head western judge of a panel of international pianists judging the 2000 Chinese Works Piano Competition.

In December 2001, Thomas went to Nanning, China to conduct his Three Scenes from the Summer Palace and other works, to perform as a pianist, and to teach master classes in composition. Thomas was an Advisor of the Guangxi Arts College and a guest conductor of the Guangxi Arts College Youth Orchestra. He returned yearly for conducting and solo performances. He was honored as the main Western speaker at a conference of middle school administrators and government officials from all parts of China.

In an effort to upgrade music education throughout China, Thomas developed a program which brought together music academies in an effort to advance all the students’ technical and artistic abilities in Western as well as Asian music. In April 2004, he conducted the Shanghai Conservatory Youth Orchestra and the Nanning Symphony in a three concerto evening with student soloists from Shanghai, Nanning, and Juilliard.

After 2003, Thomas lectured, taught, and performed in Korea at the Seoul Music Festival and Academy, a music festival he co-directed. That festival brought together Western and Korean teachers to perform and to teach advanced string and piano students. He conducted two programs with the Prime Symphony Orchestra, one with the Suwon Philharmonic, and another program for the Korean Symphony Orchestra, including his concerto for marimba and orchestra, Loving Mad Tom, all in Seoul, Korea.

On October 9, 2004, Thomas marked his 65th birthday and long service at Juilliard with a piano recital, later stepping down as Pre-College director in 2006 to focus on composing and teaching, and was honored with the title of Director Emeritus.

In 2008, he composed an evening-length, cross-cultural ballet, "Focus of the Heart" for the Chinese people, with an original story written by his partner, Howard Kessler. The score utilized both full Traditional Chinese and Western orchestras.

== Works ==
- Loving Mad Tom, a concerto for marimba and orchestra, commissioned by William Moersch,
- Merlin for solo marimba, commissioned by William Moersch,
- Three Transformations for duo marimbas, commissioned by Nancy Zeltsman,
- Consonanze Stravaganti commissioned by American Brass Quintet,
- The Heroic Triad, concerto for guitar, percussion, and string orchestra composed for Twentieth Century Unlimited
- Wind for solo Marimba, composed for Makoto Nakura,
- For the class of 2003 composed for Renée Fleming,
- Valse Triste, a solo marimba work for Simon Boyar,
- Crane by the River Li for the Traditional Chinese Instrument Orchestra of the Guangxi Arts College in Nanning, China,
- A Samba for two solo flutes, two flute choirs, and chamber orchestra,
- Music at Twilight for solo piano,
- Three Scenes from the Summer Palace.

Thomas also orchestrated his music for lyricist Gene Scheer‘s Lean Away and ‘I Just Found Another New Voice Teacher‘ for a Metropolitan Opera performance of Die Fledermaus.

== Reviews ==
After Vladimir Ashkenazy conducted The Deutsches Symphonie-Orchester Berlin in Thomas's marimba concerto, Loving Mad Tom with Evelyn Glennie as the soloist, Jürgen Otten of Der Tagespiel wrote "... his arsenal of romantic ghost music from Weber to Berlioz to Liszt is recognized here, and sound-consciously conveyed into the modern idiom."
