= Guangxi cuisine =

Culinary traditions of Guangxi, China

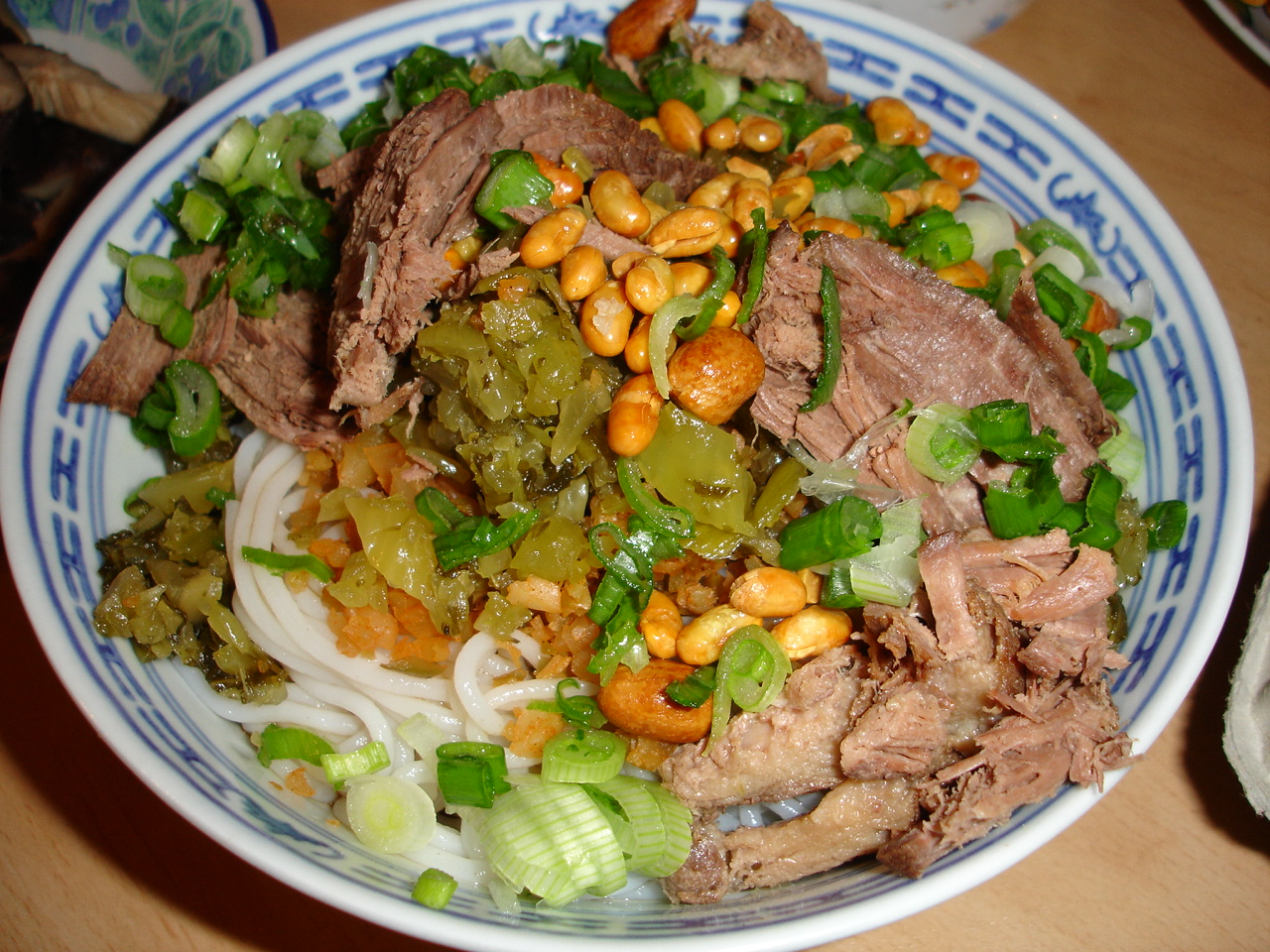
Guilin rice noodles (桂林米粉)

Guangxi cuisine is the cuisine of Guangxi, China. This cuisine ranges from Guangdong-like cuisine to Huang cuisine. The cuisine is fairly spicy. There is a difference between the city and the countryside cuisine.

Guangxi cuisine can be divided into two styles, north and south:

Southern Guangxi cuisine is very similar to Cantonese cuisine. This form of Guangxi cuisine is mild and uses more seafood than meat. Example foods include Bama roasted pork, white cut chicken, and lemon duck.

Northern Guangxi cuisine is more related to Hunan and Guizhou cuisine. It is known for its spicy, oilier, and sour tastes, with chili peppers as a versatile ingredient. Example foods include beer fish, luosifen, and Guilin rice noodles. Noodles are more commonly used in this form of cuisine.

== Examples ==
Noodles are very popular in Guangxi, both rice and wheat. Some examples of dishes include:

- Laoyou rice noodles
- Luosifen
- Taro looped meat
- Guilin rice noodles
- Stuffed river snails
- Lemon duck
