= Guangxi University of Chinese Medicine =

University in Nanning, China

- 广西中医药大学 (Chinese); Gvangjsih Cunghyihyoz Dayoz (Zhuang)
- Motto: 弘毅自强 传承创新
- Motto in English: Perseverance, Self-reliance, Inheritance, and Innovation
- Type: Public
- Established: 1956; 70 years ago
- Budget: ¥1.04 billion (2026)
- President: Li Xuebin
- Students: 14,000
- Location: Nanning, Guangxi, China
- Website: www.gxtcmu.edu.cn/english

The Guangxi University of Chinese Medicine (Zhuang: Gvangjsih Cunghyihyoz Dayoz) is a public university located in Nanning, the capital city of Guangxi Zhuang Autonomous Region in southern China. It majors in traditional Chinese medicine, integrating medical teaching, research, treatment and pharmaceutical production. Officially established in 1956, Guangxi University of Chinese Medicine is still the only independently established higher education institution for traditional Chinese medicine among all the five Autonomous regions of China. It is also a key university of basic abilities construction in Midwest China.

== History ==
In 1934, the "Guangxi Provincial Nanning Medical Research Institute" was founded in Nanning, capital city of Guangxi Zhuang Autonomous Region, China.

In 1956, the "Nanning Chinese Medicine School" was established based on the Research Institute.

In 1964, the school started to offer undergraduate programs and was renamed "Guangxi College of Traditional Chinese Medicine".

In 1970, the Nanning Jounor Medical College merged into Guangxi College of Traditional Chinese Medicine.

In 1976, the school started admitting international students.

In 1978, it became one of the first educational institutions to set up postgraduate programs in China.

In 2012, the Guangxi College of Chinese Medicine was renamed "Guangxi University of Chinese Medicine".

In 2013, the university moved to the Xianhu Campus.

In 2015, the university became an institution jointly supported by the province and the ministry.

In March 2025, the Research Center for Artificial Intelligence in Traditional Chinese Medicine was opened at Guangxi University of Chinese Medicine.

== Present situation ==
The university has the Xianhu campus and the Mingxiu campus, covering a land area of over 1,300 acres.

There are 15 affiliated hospitals (3 directly affiliated) and a number of bases for research and teaching practice.

There are 28 majors for undergraduate study, including Traditional Chinese Medicine, Integrated Chinese and Western Medicine, and Acupuncture and Tui-Na.

There are about 14,000 students, including oversea students from more than 40 countries and regions.

The university published 5 papers listed in Nature Index for the Time frame of 1 January 2025 - 31 December 2025.

Guangxi University of Chinese Medicine is a China-ASEAN Traditional Medicine Cooperation Center and Talent Training Base, and has strategic cooperation with institutions in the United States, Canada, Germany, totally more than 20 countries.

The university is a key university of basic abilities construction in Midwest China.

Guangxi University of Chinese Medicine is the only independently established higher education institution for traditional Chinese medicine among all the five ethnic minority autonomous regions of China.

Addresses

- Xianhu campus: 13 Wuhe Ave, Nanning, Guangxi Zhuang Autonomous Region, China.
- Mingxiu campus: 179 East Mingxiu Rd, Nanning, Guangxi Zhuang Autonomous Region, China.

== See also ==
- Guangxi Zhuang Autonomous Region
- Guangxi Medical University
- List of universities and colleges in Guangxi
