= White Dragon (disambiguation) =

A white dragon is a symbol associated in Welsh mythology with the Anglo-Saxons.

White Dragon or The White Dragon may also refer to:

- Russel "White Dragon" Turner, a character in the New Zealand soap opera Shortland Street
- White Dragon (DC Comics), four characters in DC Comics
  - Auggie Smith (DC Extended Universe), an original bearer of the mantle who was created for the television series Peacemaker, later adapted into mainstream comics continuity
- White Dragon (Marvel Comics), three characters in Marvel Comics
- White dragon (Dungeons & Dragons), a type of dragon in the Dungeons & Dragons roleplaying game
- The White Dragon (film), a 2004 Hong Kong wuxia comedy film directed by Wilson Yip
- White Dragon Horse, a white dragon that turned into a steed in the novel Journey to the West
- The White Dragon (novel), a science fiction novel by American-Irish author Anne McCaffrey
- White Dragon, alternate title for Strangers (2018 TV series), a British crime drama
- A mahjong tile which can either be blank or have a blue border
- Chinese Dragon God of the west and the essence of autumn

== Places ==
- Bạch Long Vĩ island, also called the "White Dragon Tail"
- White Dragon Park and White Dragon Lake, in Nanning, China
- White Dragon River, a river in Gansu and Sichuan, China
