= Wuming, Nanning =

Wuming 武鸣区 · Vujmingz Gih
- District
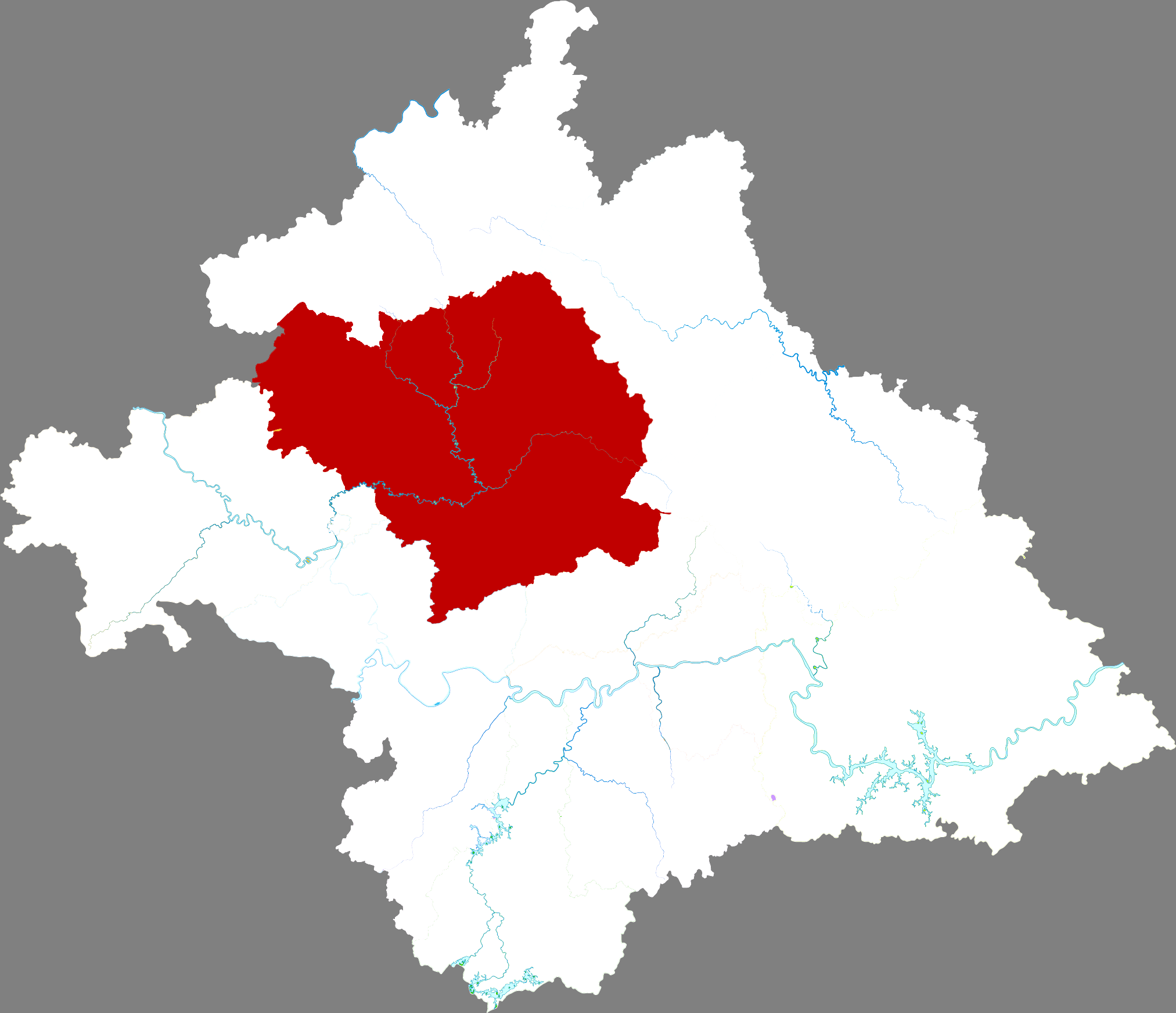
- Location in Nanning

- Location in Guangxi
- Coordinates: 23°09′32″N 108°16′26″E
- Country: China
- Autonomous region: Guangxi
- Prefecture-level city: Nanning
- District seat: Chengxiang

Area
  - Total: 3,378.36 km^{2} (1,304.39 sq mi)

Population (2019)
  - Total: 722,000
  - Density: 214/km^{2} (554/sq mi)
- Time zone: UTC+8 (China Standard)
- Postal code: 5301XX

Wuming District (simplified Chinese: 武鸣区; traditional Chinese: 武鳴區; pinyin: Wǔmíng Qū; Standard Zhuang: Vujmingz Gih) is one of 7 districts of the prefecture-level city of Nanning, the capital of Guangxi Zhuang Autonomous Region, South China. The district was approved to build from the dissolution of the former Wuming County (武鸣县) by the Chinese State Council on February 16, 2015. Located north of the city proper, it borders the prefecture-level city of Baise to the west.

== Administrative divisions ==
Wuming District is divided into 13 towns:

- Chengxiang 城厢镇
- Taiping 太平镇
- Shuangqiao 双桥镇
- Ningwu 宁武镇
- Luoxu 锣圩镇
- Xianhu 仙湖镇
- Fucheng 府城镇
- Luwo 陆斡镇
- Liangjiang 两江镇
- Luobo 罗波镇
- Lingma 灵马镇
- Ganxu 甘圩镇
- Matou 马头镇

== Language ==
Zhuang is the most widely spoken language of the district. The Zhuang dialect spoken in Shuangqiao (双桥镇) in Wuming District is used as the basis for the pronunciation of Standard Zhuang.

Several varieties of Chinese are spoken in Wuming, including Wuming Mandarin, Putonghua, Hengtang dialect (a dialect of Pinghua), Xinmin dialect (a dialect of Hakka) and Cantonese.

== Education ==
Wuming is home to the Nanning Education Park, a University City home to 18 college and university campuses, which started construction in 2015. Campuses in the park include that of Guangxi University of Finance and Economics, Nanning Normal University, Guangxi Medical University, Guangxi Industrial Vocational and Technical College, Guangxi Preschool Education College, Guangxi Vocational and Technical College of Industry and Commerce and Guangxi Safety Engineering Vocational and Technical College. A population of 150,000 students is expected by 2025.

== Transport ==
Wuming is served by Nanning North railway station, opened in 2023, on the Guiyang–Nanning high-speed railway.

== Climate ==
Climate data for Wuming, elevation 155 m (509 ft), (1991–2020 normals, extremes 1981–2010)
Month	Jan	Feb	Mar	Apr	May	Jun	Jul	Aug	Sep	Oct	Nov	Dec	Year
Record high °C (°F)	29.1 (84.4)	34.5 (94.1)	36.2 (97.2)	37.7 (99.9)	39.2 (102.6)	38.2 (100.8)	40.6 (105.1)	38.7 (101.7)	38.9 (102.0)	36.3 (97.3)	33.6 (92.5)	29.7 (85.5)	40.6 (105.1)
Mean daily maximum °C (°F)	17.0 (62.6)	19.1 (66.4)	21.8 (71.2)	27.4 (81.3)	31.1 (88.0)	32.7 (90.9)	33.5 (92.3)	33.6 (92.5)	32.4 (90.3)	29.2 (84.6)	24.9 (76.8)	19.8 (67.6)	26.9 (80.4)
Daily mean °C (°F)	13.2 (55.8)	15.2 (59.4)	18.1 (64.6)	23.1 (73.6)	26.5 (79.7)	28.2 (82.8)	28.8 (83.8)	28.7 (83.7)	27.4 (81.3)	24.1 (75.4)	19.7 (67.5)	15.0 (59.0)	22.3 (72.2)
Mean daily minimum °C (°F)	10.6 (51.1)	12.7 (54.9)	15.7 (60.3)	20.2 (68.4)	23.4 (74.1)	25.4 (77.7)	25.8 (78.4)	25.6 (78.1)	24.0 (75.2)	20.6 (69.1)	16.3 (61.3)	11.9 (53.4)	19.4 (66.8)
Record low °C (°F)	0.7 (33.3)	2.5 (36.5)	2.8 (37.0)	8.7 (47.7)	13.4 (56.1)	16.8 (62.2)	20.1 (68.2)	20.8 (69.4)	16.0 (60.8)	10.0 (50.0)	4.0 (39.2)	0.4 (32.7)	0.4 (32.7)
Average precipitation mm (inches)	50.3 (1.98)	35.7 (1.41)	71.5 (2.81)	71.1 (2.80)	181.2 (7.13)	231.5 (9.11)	211.1 (8.31)	175.4 (6.91)	95.3 (3.75)	62.8 (2.47)	50.9 (2.00)	35.5 (1.40)	1,272.3 (50.08)
Average precipitation days (≥ 0.1 mm)	10.0	10.5	14.5	12.2	14.1	16.3	16.6	14.9	9.2	6.6	6.7	7.3	138.9
Average snowy days	0.1	0	0	0	0	0	0	0	0	0	0	0	0.1
Average relative humidity (%)	76	77	80	77	77	79	78	78	74	71	72	71	76
Mean monthly sunshine hours	60.9	57.3	49.8	93.4	142.5	147.1	185.1	190.2	178.4	161.2	131.5	111.9	1,509.3
Percentage possible sunshine	18	18	13	25	35	36	45	48	49	45	40	34	34
Source: China Meteorological Administration
