= Lemon duck =

Duck dish

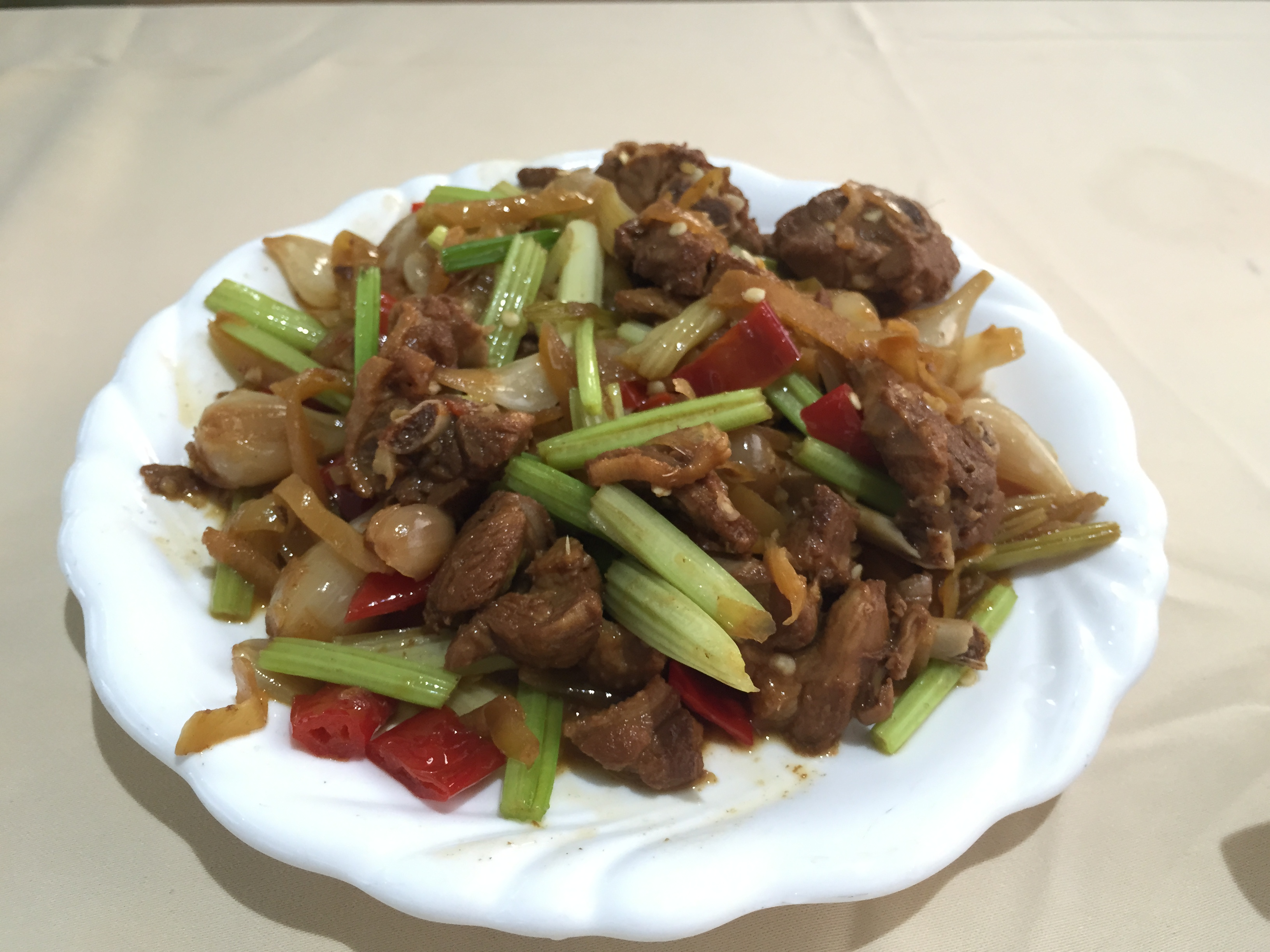
- Alternative names: Ningmeng ya
- Place of origin: China
- Region or state: Guangxi
- Main ingredients: duck
- Ingredients generally used: preserved lemon peel, garlic, chilli

Lemon duck or ningmeng ya (Chinese: 柠檬鸭; pinyin: níngméng yā) is a specialty dish of the Wuming district, Nanning, Guangxi. The sour preserved lemon peel and other sour preserved ingredients used are a common feature of the cooking of the Zhuang minority who live in Guangxi. Lemon is otherwise not commonly used in Chinese cuisine. The flavor is described as 'hot and sour' (Chinese: 酸辣; pinyin: suānlà).

== See also ==
- List of duck dishes
- Zhuang people
