= Wuming Mandarin =

Dialect of Mandarin spoken in Guangxi

- Wuming Guanhua
- 武鸣官话
- Native to: China
- Region: Wuming District
- Native speakers: 40,000 (2005)
- Language family: Sino-Tibetan: Sinitic; Chinese; Mandarin; Southwestern Mandarin; Gui–Liu; Wuming Mandarin

Language codes
- ISO 639-3: –
- Glottolog: None

Wuming Mandarin or Wuming Guanhua (simplified Chinese: 武鸣官话; traditional Chinese: 武鳴官話; pinyin: Wǔmíng Guānhuà), known locally as Wuminghua (武鸣话; 武鳴話; Wǔmínghuà; 'Wuming speech'), is a dialect of Southwestern Mandarin spoken in urban Wuming District, specifically in the towns of Chengxiang and Fucheng. It is a variety that has been influenced substantially by Zhuang, which is the majority language of the district.

== Classification ==
Wuming Mandarin is classified as a part of the Gui–Liu subgroup (桂柳片; Guì-Liǔ piàn) of Southwestern Mandarin. The second edition of the Language Atlas of China further classifies it as part of the Guinan (southern Guangxi) cluster (桂南小片; Guìnán xiǎopiàn).

== Phonology ==
=== Initials ===
There are 18 phonemic initials (including the zero initial):

		Bilabial		Alveolar		Velar		Glottal
Plosive	plain	p		t		k		ʔ
Plosive	aspirated	pʰ		tʰ		kʰ		
Affricate	plain			ts				
Affricate	aspirated			tsʰ				
Fricative		f		s		x		
Lateral fricative				ɬ				
Nasal			m		n		ŋ	
Lateral approximant					l			

=== Rimes ===
There are seventy (70) rimes.

=== Tones ===
There are seven tones, six of which are native:

Name	Tone letter
yin level (阴平; 陰平)	˧ (33)
yang level (阳平; 陽平)	˨˩ (21)
rising (上声; 上聲)	˥ (55)
departing (去声; 去聲)	˨˦ (24)
high entering (入声高调; 入聲高調)	˥ (55)
low entering (入声低调; 入聲低調)	˨˩ (21)

The other tone, ˧˥ (35), is non-native, occurs in very few words, and corresponds to the yin level (阴平; 陰平) tone in Pinghua.
