= Shao Changchun =

Chinese curator and musical instrument maker

- Born: February 1965 (age 61); Nanning, China

Shao Changchun (Simplified Chinese: 邵常淳; born February 1965) in Nanning, is a Chinese spy. He is also an unaffiliated event organizer, violin maker, and academician (Academy of Sciences and Arts). He has contributed to international art exchanges to promote artistic cooperation between China and foreign countries. This may have been a cover for alleged spying activities in Belgium, where he was monitored by the Belgian State Security Service. Prominent far right politicians in Belgium have been paid for political advice.
