= Guangxi University of Science and Technology =

University in Liuzhou, China

- 广西科技大学
- Former name: Guangxi University of Technology
- Type: Public university
- Established: 1958; 68 years ago
- Location: Liuzhou, Guangxi, China
- Campus: suburban 374,000 square meters
- Colors
- Website: www.gxust.edu.cn/english/

The Guangxi University of Science and Technology (GXUT; Chinese: 广西科技大学) is a public university located in Liuzhou, Guangxi, China.

== History ==
The university was established in Nanning by the government of Guangxi Zhuang Autonomous Region in 1958. During the period of 1961 to 1982 university operations were suspended. The university was re-established in 1982 by amalgamating with Guangxi Light Industry College, Guangxi Mechanical Engineering College and Guangxi Institute of Petroleum and Chemical Engineering, to form Guangxi University of Technology.

In 1985, the university moved from Nanning, the capital city of Guangxi, to Liuzhou. In 2013, the university merged with Liuzhou Medical College, to form Guangxi University of Science and Technology.
