= People's Hospital of Guangxi Zhuang Autonomous Region =

- Guangxi Province

Geography
- Location: Nanning, Guangxi Zhuang Autonomous Region, China
- Coordinates: 22.803965°N 108.328281°E

Organisation
- Care system: Provincial 3A
- Funding: Public hospital
- Type: Teaching

Services
- Beds: 2207

History
- Opened: 1941

Links
- Website: www.gxhospital.com
- Lists: Hospitals in China

The People's Hospital of Guangxi Zhuang Autonomous Region (Chinese: 广西壮族自治区人民医院) is a large, comprehensive provincial 3A hospital and medical center of Guangxi Zhuang Autonomous Region, China, established in 1941. As a teaching hospital, it facilitates final year medical students from Guangxi Medical University and Guilin Medical University.
