= Beibu Gulf University =

University in Qinzhou, China

Coordinates: 21.900°N 108.612°E

- 北部湾大学
- Other names: 湾大
- Former names: QinZhou College
- Motto: 博观内省、达道知行
- Motto in English: "Observe broadly, reflect deeply, attain knowledge, and act accordingly."
- Type: Public
- Established: 1973
- Rector: Miao Jian
- Total staff: 1400
- Students: 22,500
- Location: Qinzhou, Guangxi, China
- Campus: 2070 mu; Rural
- Website: en.bbgu.edu.cn

Beibu Gulf University is a university in Qinzhou City, Guangxi Zhuang Autonomous Region, China. It is a full-time regular higher education institution primarily focused on engineering, natural sciences, and management. It is a jointly established university by the People's Government of Guangxi Zhuang Autonomous Region and the State Oceanic Administration. It is also a participant in the "Applied Undergraduate University" project of the 13th Five-Year Plan of China. Moreover, it is recognized as a base for the "Industry-Education Integration Innovation Experiment" by the School Planning and Construction Development Center of the Ministry of Education. Beibu Gulf University is a pilot institution for the transformation and development of new undergraduate institutions in Guangxi and a founding member of the National Alliance of Applied Technology Universities. The campus is also designated as a 3A-level scenic area. In 2023, the university celebrated its 50th anniversary and the 117th year of teacher education programs.

== History ==
The university's history can be traced back to the establishment of Qinzhou Area Normal School in 1973. In 1982, it was renamed Qinzhou Area Teacher Training College, and in 1985, it expanded to become Qinzhou Branch of Guangxi Normal University. In 1988, Qinzhou Area Teacher Training College was renamed Qinzhou Area Education College, and in 1991, it was transformed into Qinzhou Normal Higher Vocational School. In 2004, Qinzhou Ethnic Normal School, originally founded in 1906 (including Qinzhou Branch of Guangxi Radio and Television University), merged with Qinzhou Normal Higher Vocational School. In 2006, it was upgraded to Qinzhou University. In late November 2018, the Ministry of Education approved the establishment of Beibu Gulf University on the basis of Qinzhou University.

== Overview ==
The school covers an area of 2070 acres with approximately 700,000 square meters of building space. The staff includes about 1,400 members. The total full-time student body is about 22,500, including 436 master's students and over 300 international students. The institution comprises 19 academic units: the College of Marine Science, Maritime College, College of Mechanical, Shipbuilding & Ocean Engineering, College of Petroleum & Chemical Engineering, College of Food Engineering, College of Electronics & Information Engineering, College of Architectural Engineering, College of Resources & Environment, College of Science, College of Economics & Management, College of Humanities, College of International Education & Foreign Languages, College of Ceramics & Design, College of Education, College of Marxism, College of Physical Education, Beibu Gulf University-East Michigan Joint College of Engineering, College of Continuing Education, and College of Innovation & Entrepreneurship.
