= People's Park (Nanning) =

Urban public park in Nanning, Guangxi, China

- White Dragon Park
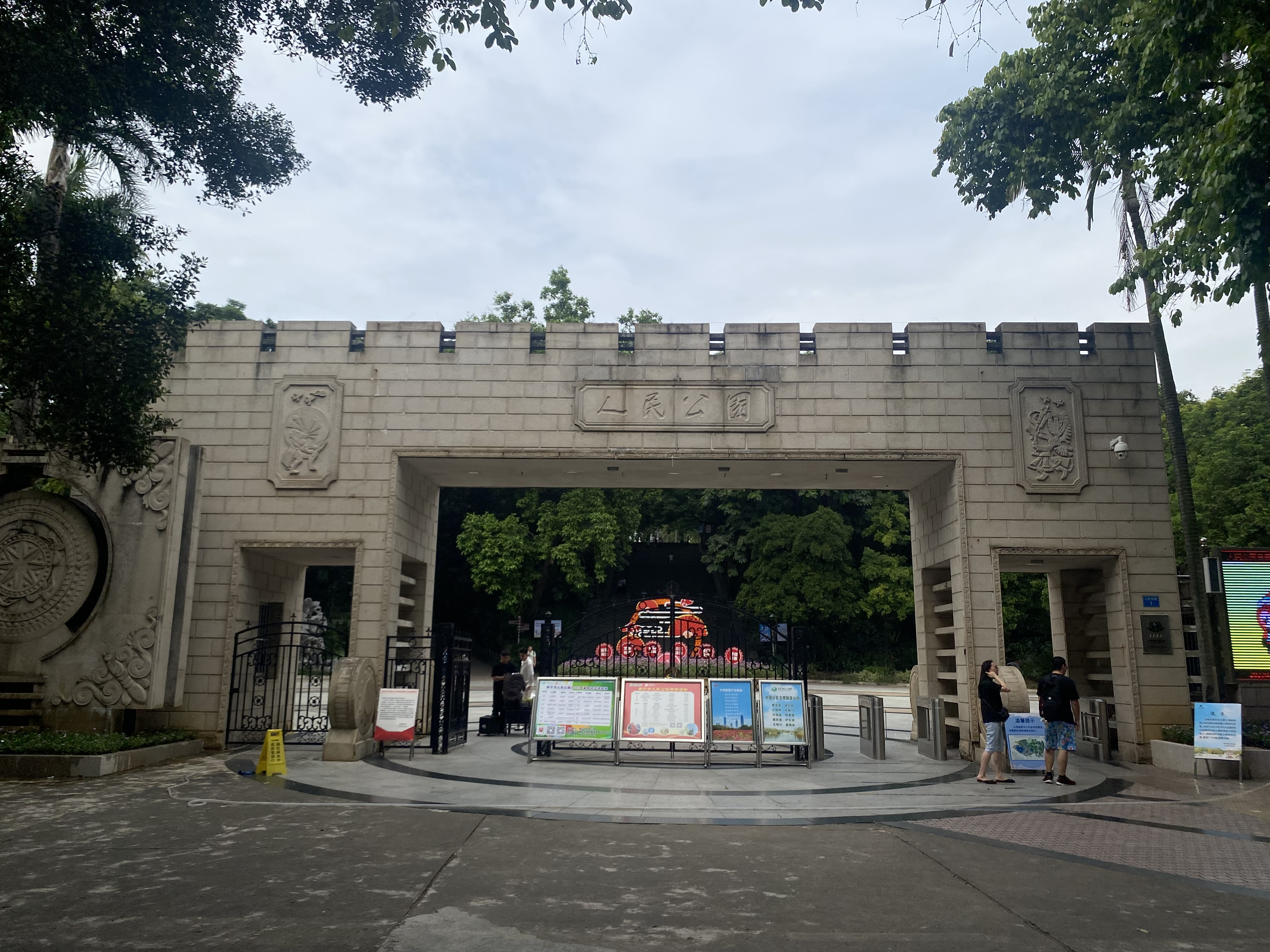
- Main entrance of Nanning People's Park
- Interactive map of People's Park
- Type: Urban park
- Location: Nanning, Guangxi, China
- Coordinates: 22°49′38″N 108°19′50″E

People's Park (Chinese: 人民公园; pinyin: Rénmín Gōngyuán) is an urban public park in central Nanning, the capital of Guangxi Zhuang Autonomous Region in southern China. It is also known as White Dragon Park (Chinese: 白龙公园; pinyin: Báilóng Gōngyuán) because of the White Dragon Lake inside the park.

== Overview ==
People's Park is located at 1 East Renmin Road in central Nanning, a ten-minute walk from Chaoyang Square. Its main features are the 70,000-square-metre (17-acre) White Dragon Lake (白龙湖), with a small island connected to the shore by two bridges, and Wangxian Hill (望仙坡), the highest point in downtown Nanning. On top of the hill is the Zhenning Fort (镇宁炮台), reached by 141 ten-meter-wide (33 ft) stone steps.

In the middle of the park is the Shady Botanical Garden, featuring rare herbs, local flowers, and a 1,000-year-old banyan tree. In the northeast corner is a 25-metre-tall (82 ft) Monument to Revolutionary Martyrs, surrounded by pine and cypress trees. The park is rated an AAA tourist attraction by the China National Tourism Administration.

== History ==
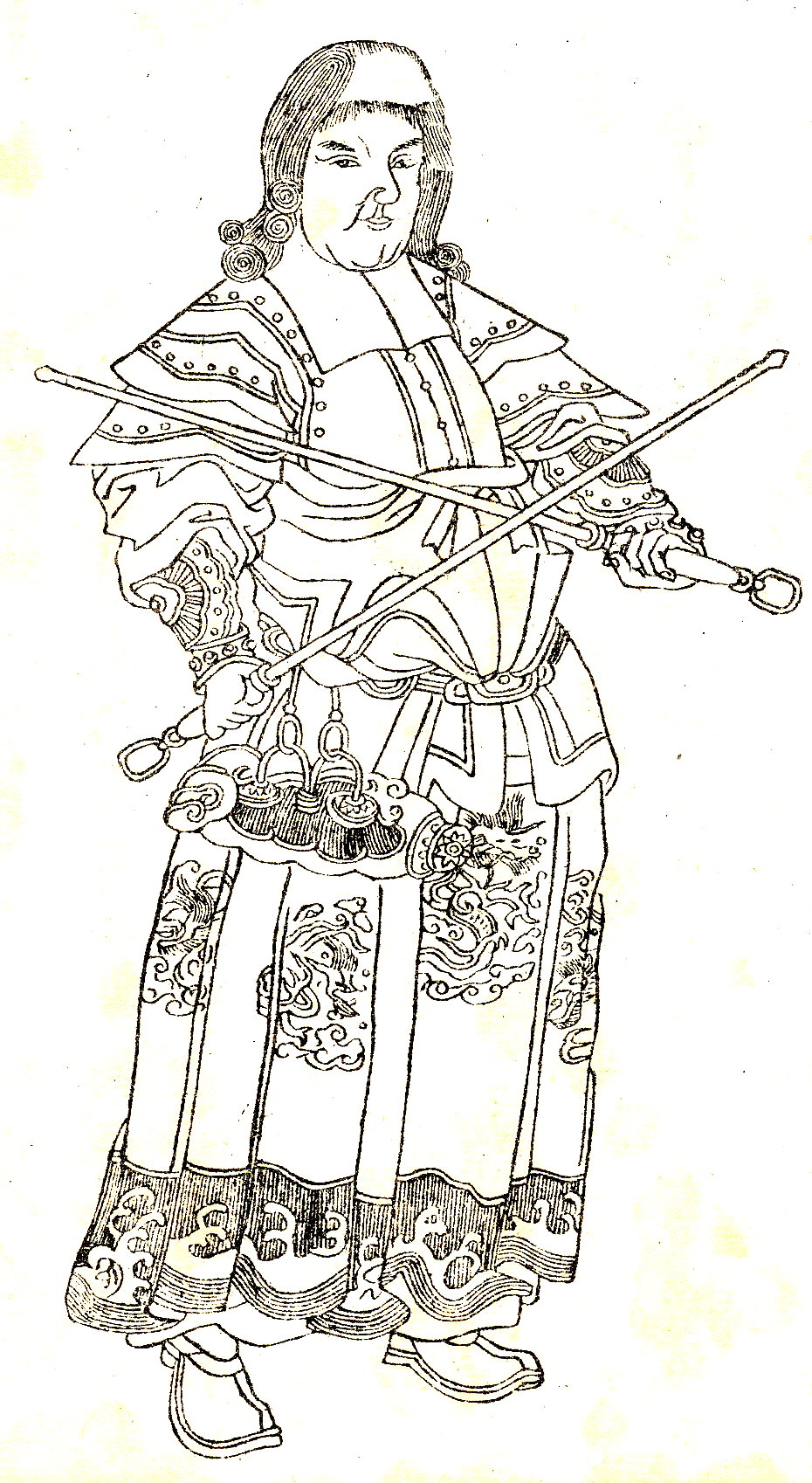
General Di Qing

According to the Southern Song dynasty geographical text Yudi Jisheng (輿地紀勝), Di Qing (1008–1057), the Northern Song general who suppressed the rebellion of Nong Zhigao in Guangxi, stationed his troops nearby. He once saw a flock of white sheep beside the lake, which he thought resembled a dragon, and named the lake White Dragon Lake.

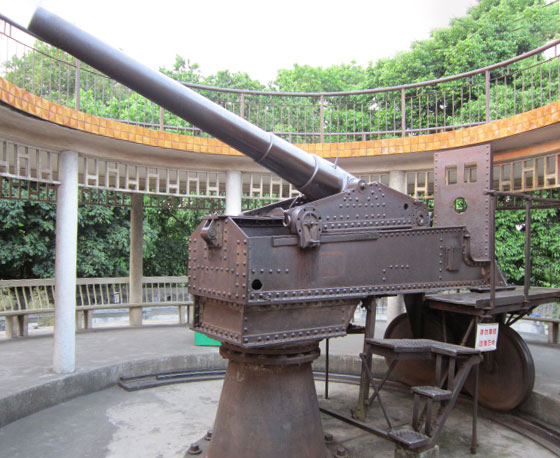
120 mm Krupp cannon manufactured in 1891 and bought by the Qing government to protect the southern border of China with Vietnam.

The Temple of Six Lords (六公祠) once stood on top of Wangxian Hill in the park. The temple was dedicated to six significant people in the history of Nanning, namely Di Qing, Sun Mian (孫沔), Yu Jing (余靖), Su Jian (苏缄), Wang Yangming, and Mang Yitu (莽依圖). In 1917, the Guangxi warlord Lu Rongting demolished the temple and built the Zhenning Fort on the site, with a 120mm rail-mounted cannon manufactured by the German Krupp Company in 1890. The fort and the cannon are now open to visitors.
