= Guilin Medical University =

University in Guilin, China

- Motto: 弘德善医
- Type: Public coeducational
- Established: 1935; 91 years ago
- Location: Guilin, Guangxi, China
- Colors: Green
- Website: www.glmu.edu.cn

Guilin Medical University (GLMU; simplified Chinese: 桂林医科大学; traditional Chinese: 桂林醫科大學) is a public university, located in Guilin, Guangxi, China. The university offers undergraduate and postgraduate programs through its schools: School of Medicine, School of Nursing and Midwifery and Graduate School.

== History ==
Guilin Medical University (GLMU), formerly known as Guilin Senior Nurse Midwifery School, was founded in 1935. It was transformed and renamed as Guilin Medical School in 1958. Approved by the former State Board of Education in 1987, the school was upgraded to a college for medical undergraduates. In 1993, the college was granted to train foreign students and in 2006, it was authorized to conduct graduate programs. GLMU was recognized as an “Excellent University” by the Ministry of Education of China in 2012.

For the past five years, the university has undertaken 945 research projects, 117 of which are national projects, 161 provincial and ministerial projects, 44 science and technology achievement awards at all levels. It won 49 national patents, including 12 invention patents, 4,194 research papers, including 168 SCI and EI Indexed Papers, 1,791 Chinese core journals and completed 134 provincial teaching reform project in nearly five years. GLMU was conferred the national teaching award and 33 provincial teaching achievement awards. The university was featured in the "Chinese Medicine" Chinese Academic journal, "China Journal", "Articles Digital Periodicals" online journal, the journal of the American Chemical Abstracts and Guangxi outstanding scientific journal.

On February 21, 2025, the university changed its Chinese name following approval from the Ministry of Education.

== Philosophy ==
弘德善医 “hóng dé shàn yī”

1. Importance of a moral education foundation and the essence of modern education in medical colleges;

2. Medical and teaching staff who embody good morals and life-saving values;

3. Generations of Guangxi Medical students who study hard in pursuit of truth and strive to reach the peak of medical science and technology;

4. Duty to heal the sick, relieve pain and unknown illnesses, and the noble spirit of selfless dedication.

== Campus ==
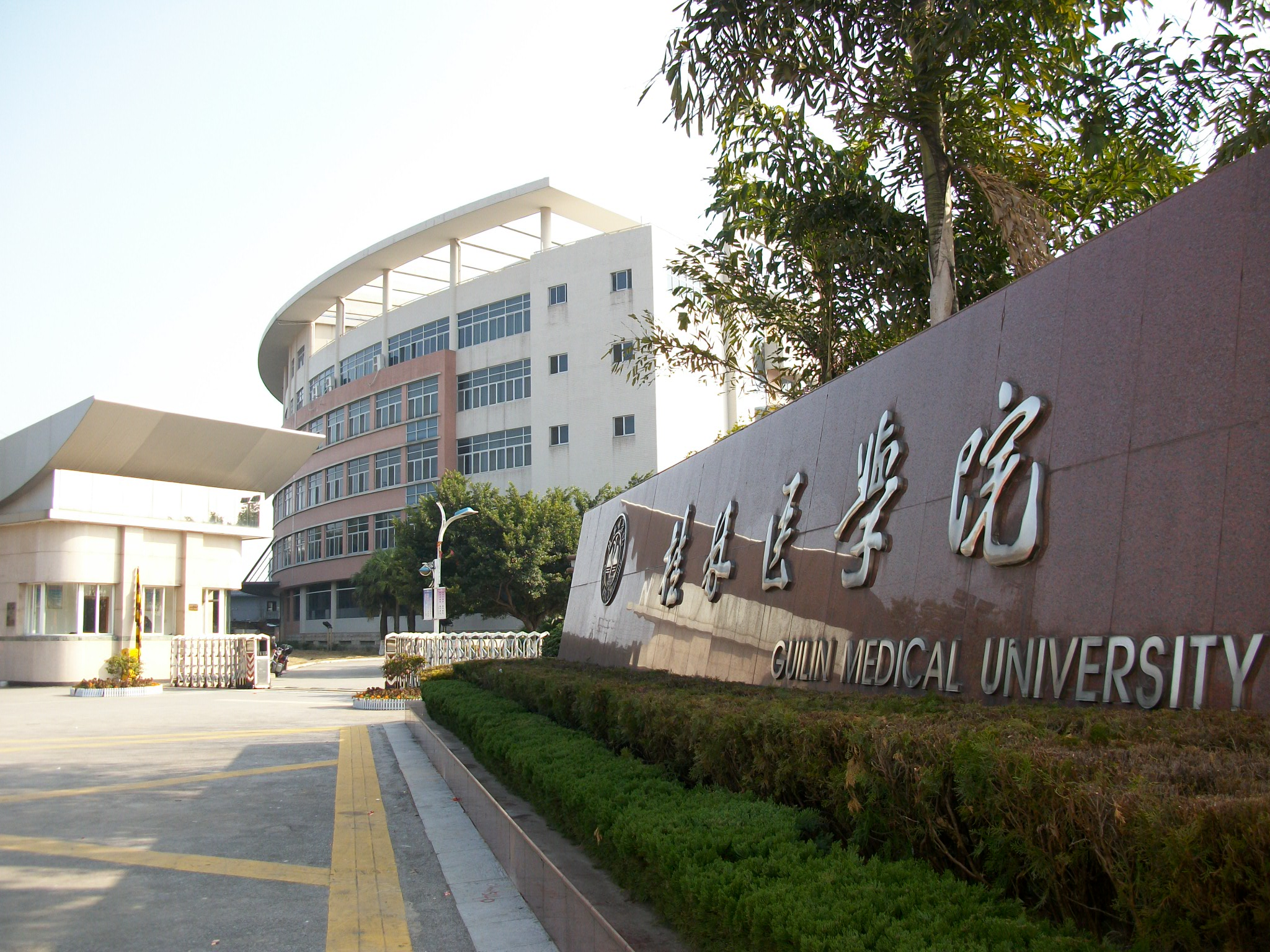
The Dongcheng campus gate.

GLMU currently has three campuses, Lequn, Dongcheng and Lingui covering a total area of 1334.27 acres.

Le Qun campus, the oldest of the three, is situated in downtown Guilin across one of the best hospitals in Guangxi Province, the Affiliated Hospital of Guilin Medical University where the medical students have their training and practice. This campus is also beside the famous Li River (Guangxi) and the Jingjiang Princes' City.

The university's main campus, Dong Cheng, is in the east bank of the Li River near the Shangri-La Hotels and Resorts and Guilin University of Technology. It is where the offices such as the International Education Department and the Foreign Languages Department are found. The foreign medical students take their respective classes in this campus.

The biggest campus lies in the beautiful Lingui District. Lingui campus has an area wide enough to cater to the students enrolled in the university. Surrounded with a lake, tall trees and colorful flowers, it provides an eco-friendly environment to teachers, students and visitors alike.

GLMU has 20 secondary college departments, six affiliated hospitals, 23 clinical teaching laboratories, and 94 classrooms for teaching practice.

== Academics ==
Guilin Medical University gives priority to clinical medicine and integrates pharmacy, biotechnology, medical assay, and nursing. It is a multi-major university developed harmoniously with a strong comprehensive power and a definite influence in and out of Guangxi Zhuang Autonomous Region. GLMU takes an active part in the international exchanges and cooperation, and is one of the earliest institutions of higher learning accredited by the former State Education Committee.

At present, GLMU accommodates Chinese and International students from Southeast Asia namely Nepal, Bangladesh, India, Pakistan, Vietnam and Thailand under the undergraduate (majors) and graduate degrees.

== Colleges (faculties) ==
- College of Biotechnology
- College of Pharmacy
- College of Basic Medicine
- College of Clinical Medicine
- Second College of Clinical Medicine
- Third College of Clinical Medicine
- College of Clinical Medicine at Nanxi Shan
- College of Nursing
- College of Further Education

== See also ==
- People's Hospital of Guangxi Zhuang Autonomous Region
