= Laoyou rice noodles =

Rice noodle dish

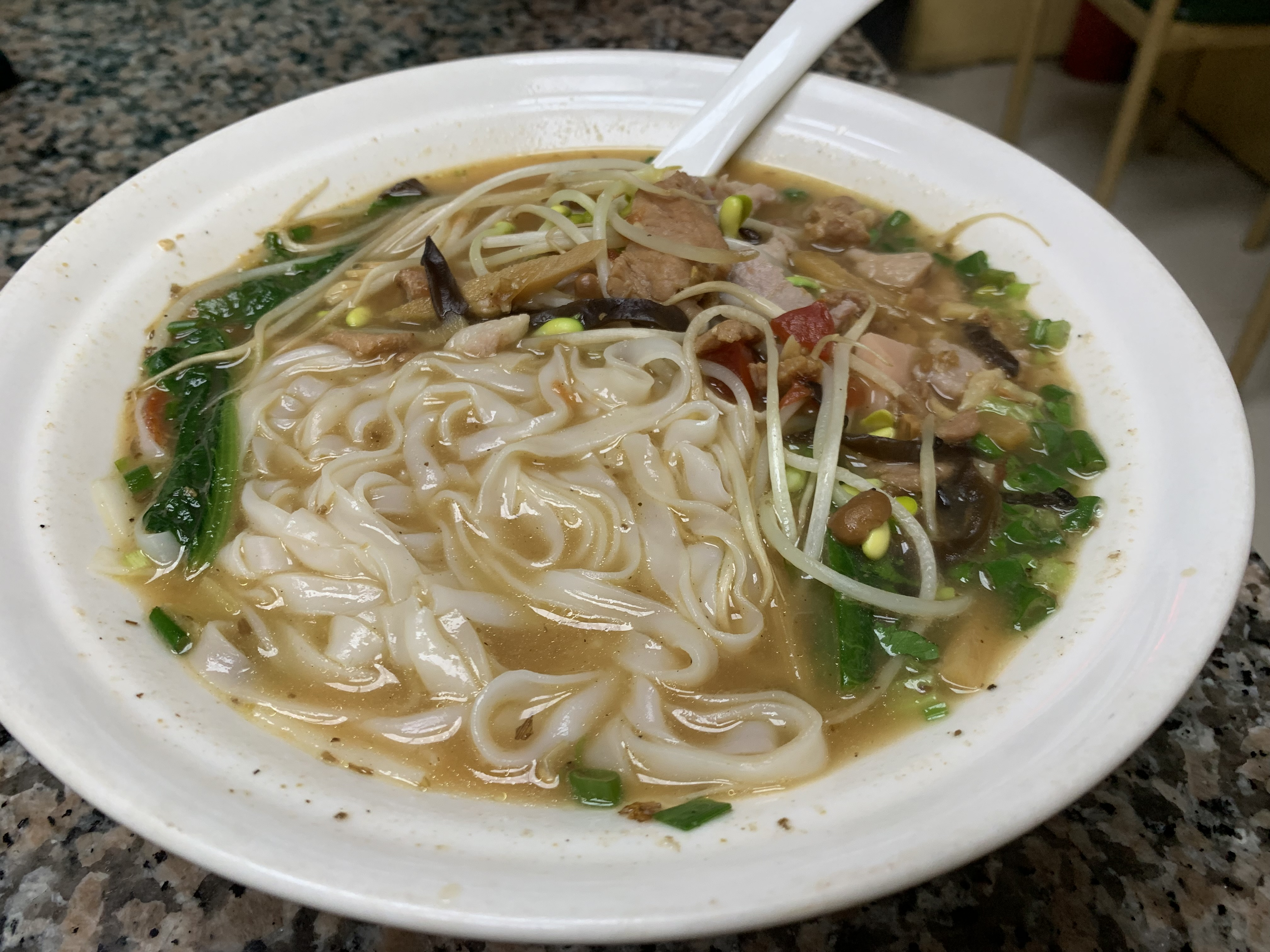
A bowl of pork laoyoufen served in Zhongshan

Laoyou rice noodles (Chinese: 老友粉), which translates as "old friend rice noodles", is a local noodle dish local to Nanning, China. It is made of fried pepper, sour bamboo shoots, black beans, garlic, pork, soup and rice noodles.

== Legend ==
In the 1930s, an old man in Nanning used to visit a tea house every day. But once, he did not show up for many days due to the flu. When the tea house owner heard about it, he prepared a bowl of hot noodles for the old man with pickled bamboo shoots, chili, fermented soya beans, and crushed garlic. The sour and spicy noodles helped the old man recover fast. The old man was grateful to the tea house owner and later sent him a plaque reading "old friend frequent." According to the story, this is how laoyou noodles, also known as "old friend noodles" or "old buddy noodles", got its name. Since the people of Nanning love eating rice noodles, the dish gradually became laoyou rice noodles.
