= Guangxi University of Finance and Economics =

University in Guangxi, China

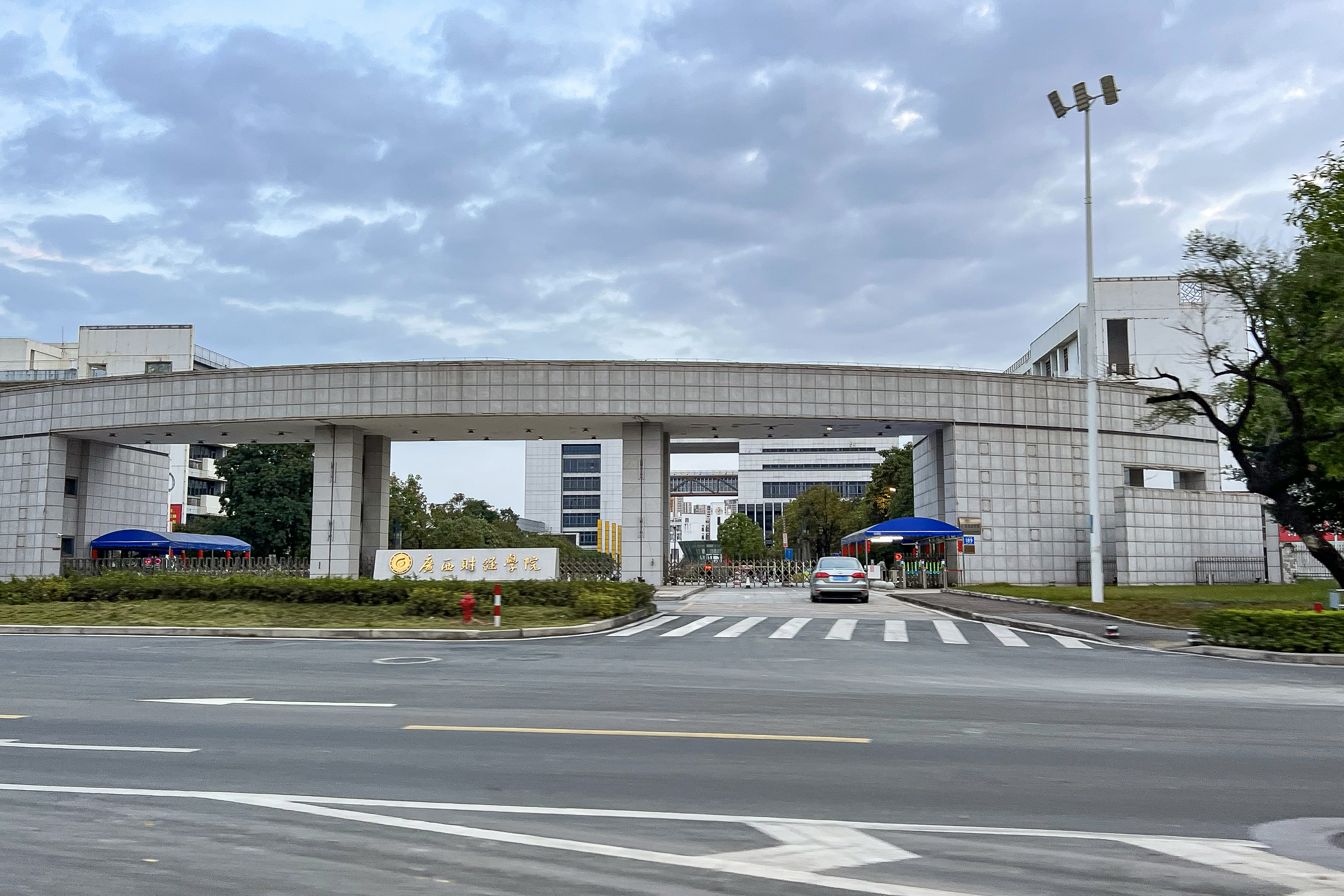
Xiangsihu campus

Guangxi University of Finance and Economics (Chinese: 广西财经学院; pinyin: Guǎngxī Cáijīng Xuéyuàn) is a university located in Guangxi Zhuang Autonomous Region's capital Nanning at Ming Xiu xi lu. It offers undergraduate and postgraduate courses and programs leading to officially recognized degrees in several areas of study. Guangxi University of Finance and Economics also provides several academic and non-academic facilities and services to students including a library, as well as administrative services.
