= Nanning =

Capital city of Guangxi, China

Nanning 南宁市 · Namzningz Si
- Prefecture-level city
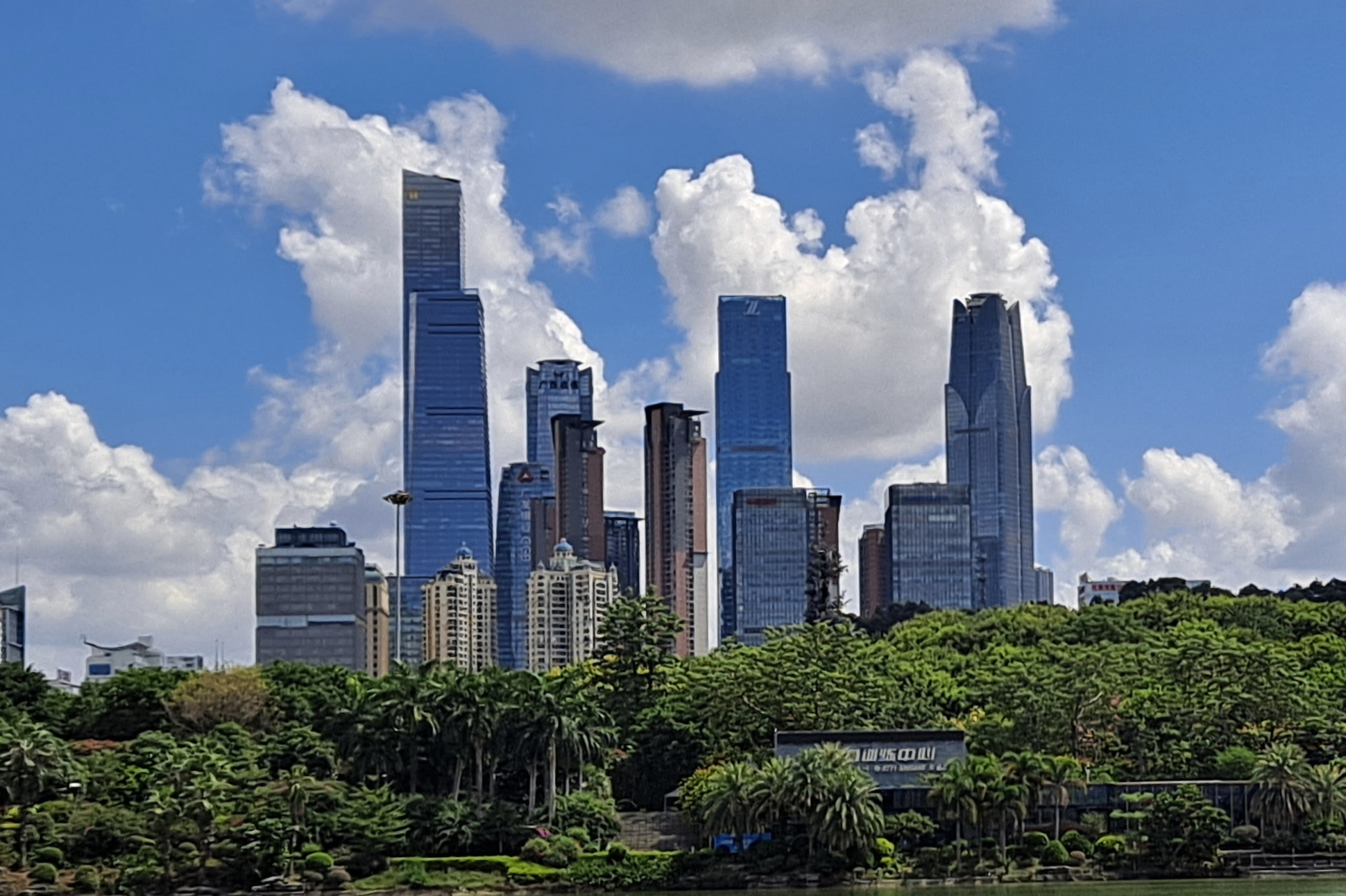
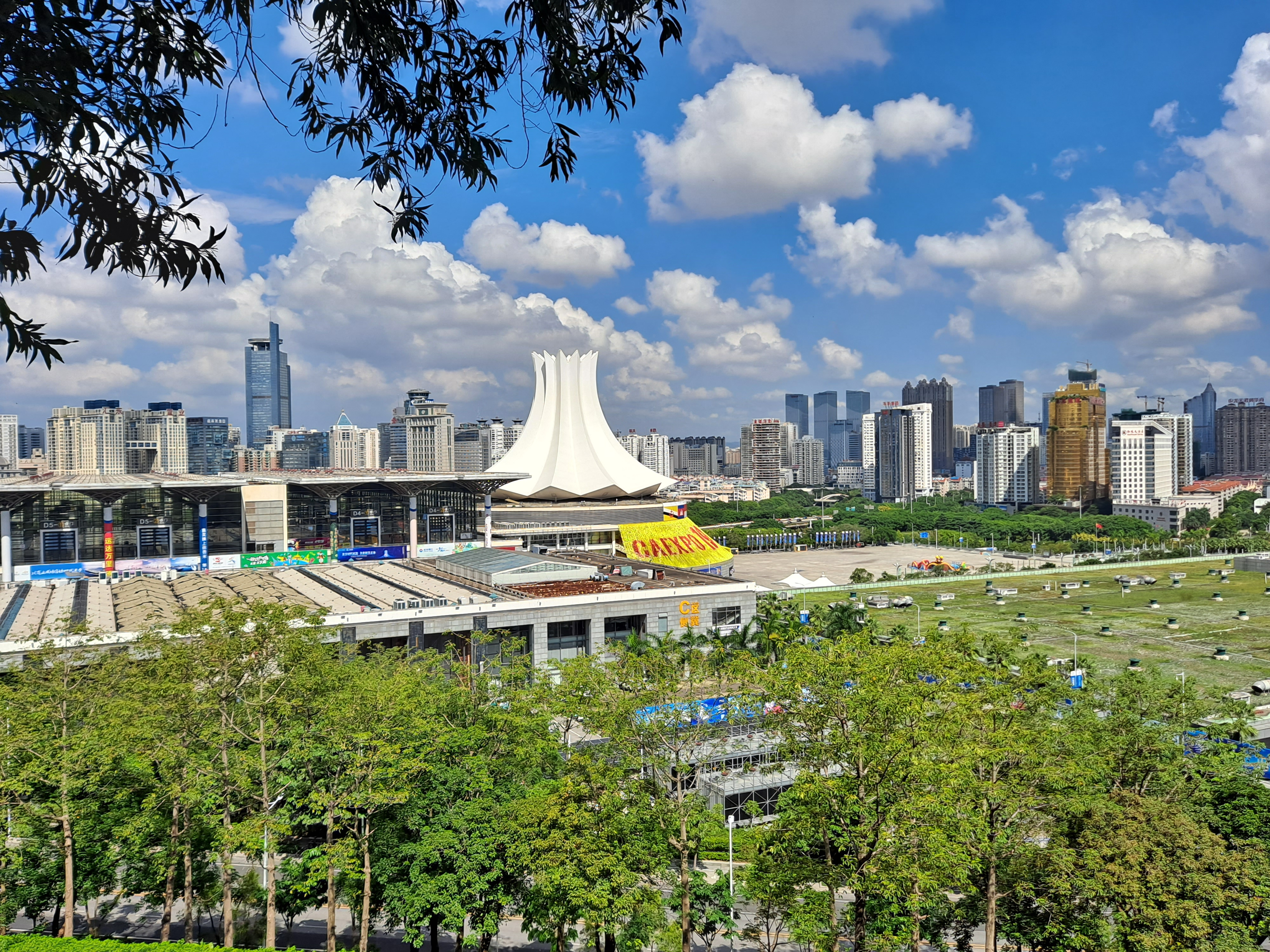
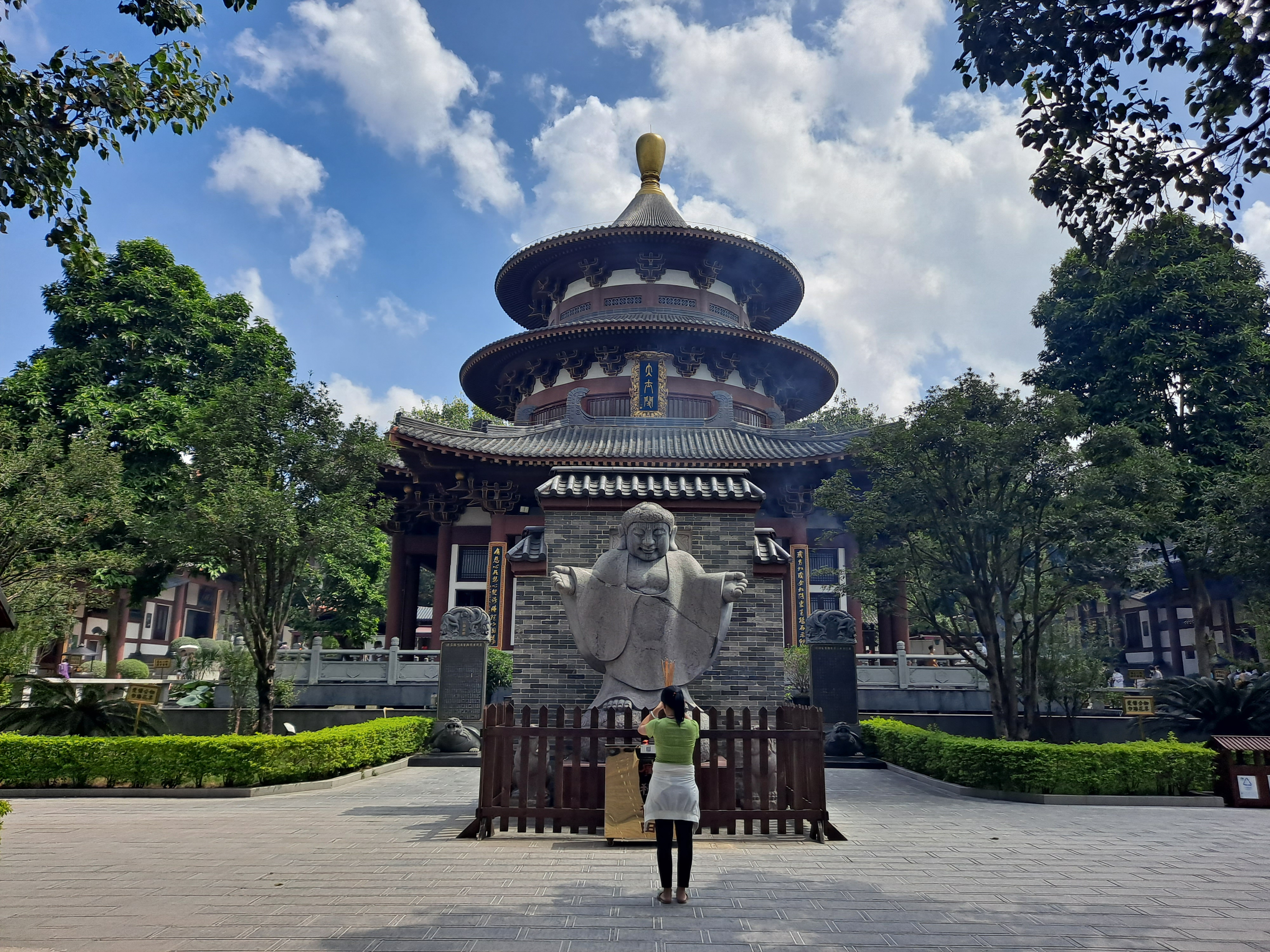
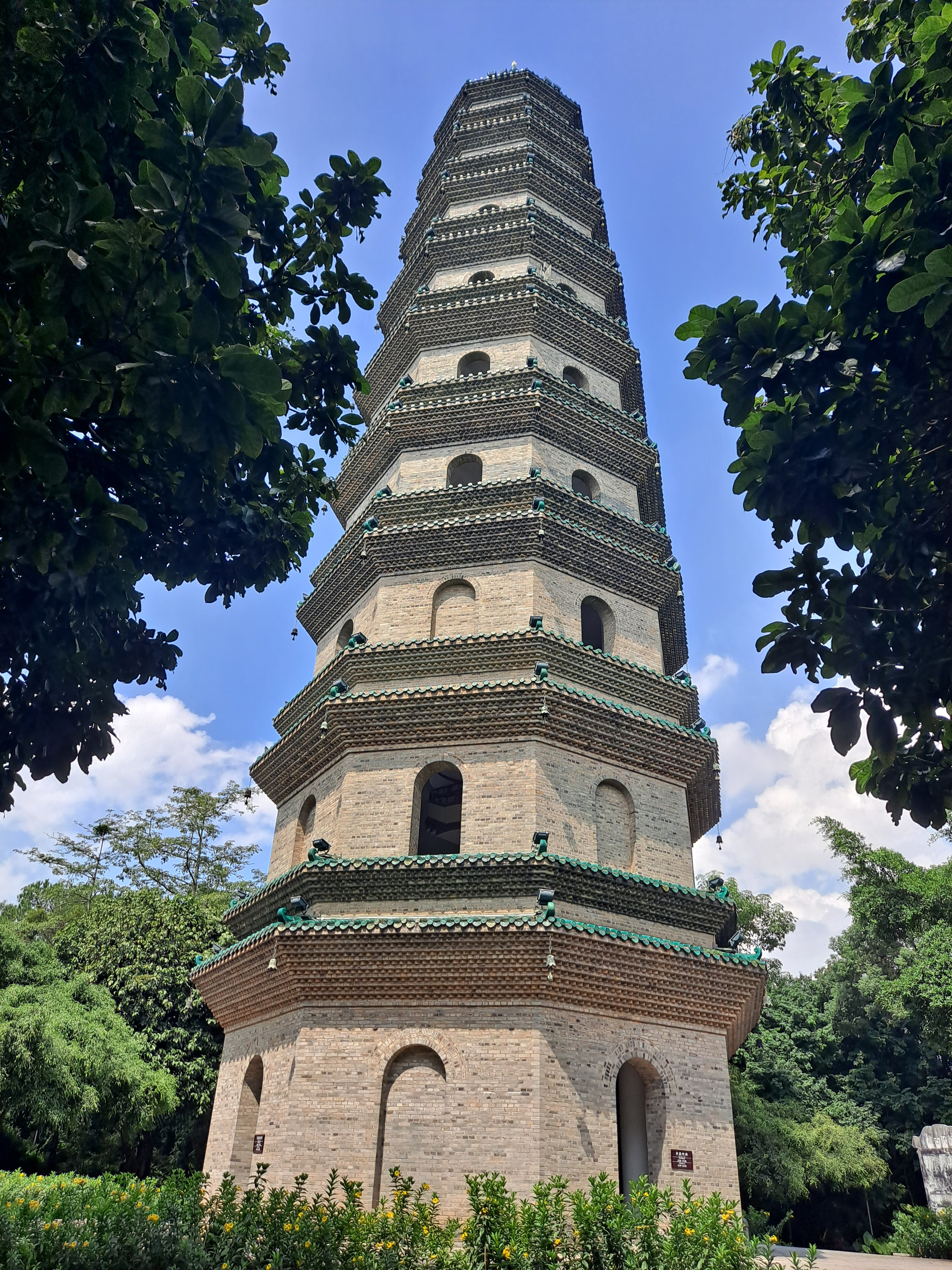
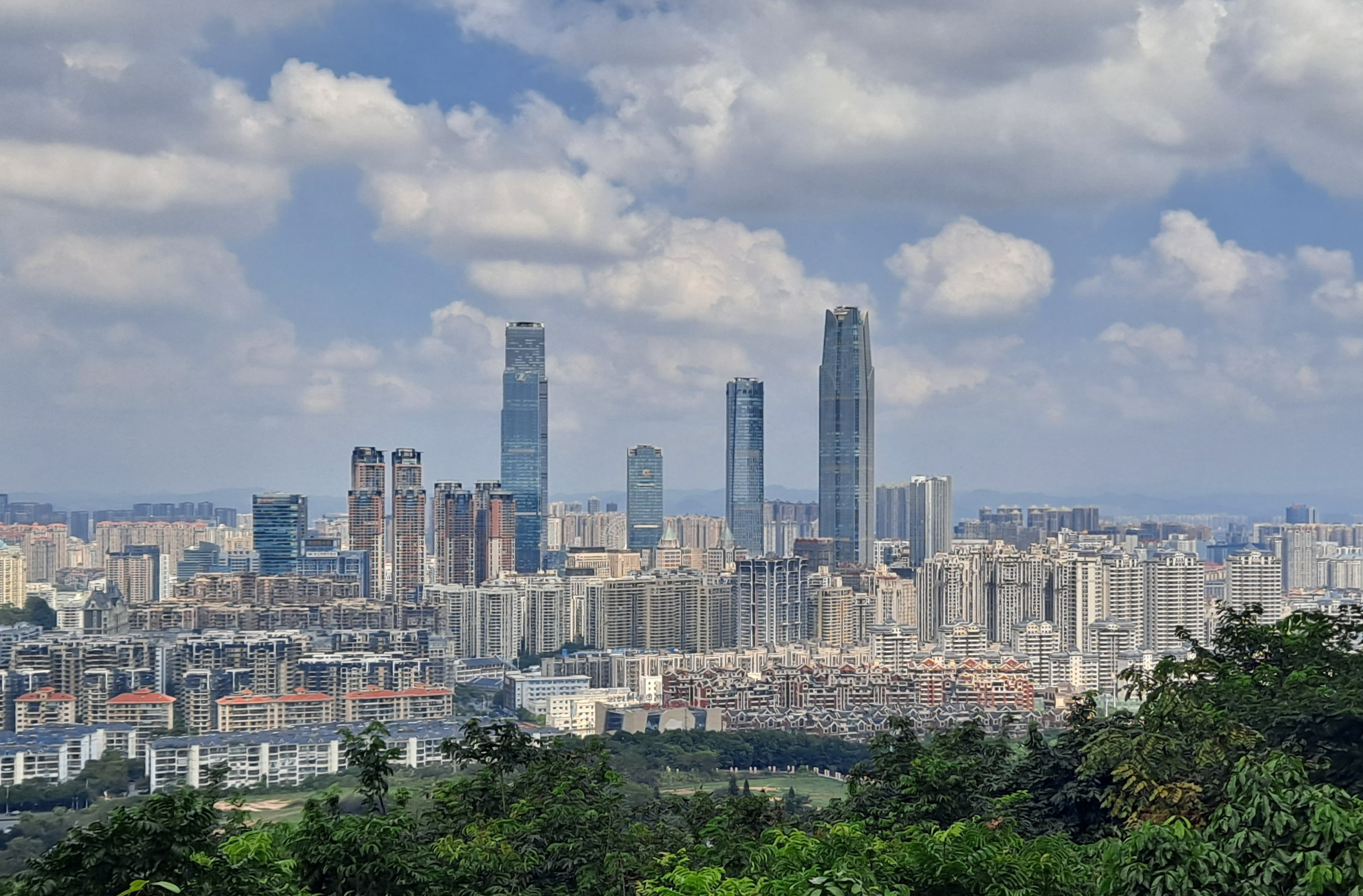
- Qingxiu District skyline NICEC Qingxiu Mountain Longxiang Pagoda View from Qingxiu Mountain

- Location of Nanning City jurisdiction in Guangxi

- Location in China
- Coordinates (Guangxi People's Government): 22°49′00″N 108°19′39″E
- Country: China
- Region: Guangxi
- Municipal seat: Qingxiu District

Government
  - Type: Prefecture-level city
  - Body: Nanning Municipal People's Congress
  - CCP Secretary: Tan Pichuang
  - Congress Chairman: Huang Zhongxian
  - Mayor: Zhong Dezhi
  - CPPCC Chairman: Yang Weichao

Area
  - Prefecture-level city: 22,189 km^{2} (8,567 sq mi)
  - Urban: 6,559 km^{2} (2,532 sq mi)
  - Metro: 5,264 km^{2} (2,032 sq mi)

Population (2020 census)
  - Prefecture-level city: 8,741,584
  - Density: 393.96/km^{2} (1,020.4/sq mi)
  - Urban: 5,977,185
  - Urban density: 911.3/km^{2} (2,360/sq mi)
  - Metro: 5,293,359
  - Metro density: 1,006/km^{2} (2,604/sq mi)

GDP
  - Prefecture-level city: CN¥ 512.1 billion US$ 79.4 billion
  - Per capita: CN¥ 58,241; US$ 9,028
- Time zone: UTC+8 (China Standard)
- Postal code: 530000
- Area code: 0771
- ISO 3166 code: CN-GX-01
- License plate prefixes: 桂A
- Website: www.nanning.gov.cn

Nanning
- "Nánníng" in Traditional (top) and Simplified (bottom) Chinese characters

Chinese name
- Simplified Chinese: 南宁
- Traditional Chinese: 南寧
- Hanyu Pinyin: Nánníng
- Literal meaning: "Southern tranquility"
Transcriptions
Standard Mandarin
- Hanyu Pinyin: Nánníng
- Bopomofo: ㄋㄢˊ ㄋㄧㄥˊ
- Gwoyeu Romatzyh: Nanning
- Wade–Giles: Nan^{2}-ning^{2}
- IPA: [nǎn.nǐŋ]
Yue: Cantonese
- Yale Romanization: Nàahmnìhng
- Jyutping: Naam4ning4
- IPA: [nam˩.nɪŋ˩]
Southern Min
- Hokkien POJ: Lâm-lêng

Zhuang name
- Zhuang: Namzningz
- 1957 orthography: Namƨniŋƨ

Nanning (Note: /ˌnɑːnˈnɪŋ/, also /ˌnænˈnɪŋ/; Chinese: 南宁; pinyin: Nánníng; Zhuang: Namzningz) is the capital of the Guangxi Zhuang Autonomous Region in southern China. It is known as the "Green City (绿城)" because of its abundance of lush subtropical foliage. Located in the South of Guangxi, Nanning is surrounded by a hilly basin, with a warm, monsoon-influenced humid subtropical climate.

Beginning in 1949, as it underwent sustained industrial growth, Nanning's economy began developing beyond its former role, and the city became essentially a commercial and administrative centre. Today, Nanning is considered the economic, financial and cultural center of Guangxi, and the chief centre for the training of the Zhuang minority in Guangxi. The People's Park is located in the center of the city. The city also serves as a gateway for the China-ASEAN opening up and cooperation.

As of 2025, Nanning was ranked one of the top 150 science cities in the world by scientific research outputs. The city is home to several notable universities in South China, including Guangxi University, Guangxi Medical University, Guangxi University for Nationalities, Guangxi University of Finance and Economics and Guangxi Arts University.

== History ==
=== Imperial era ===
Nanning, an ancient city with a long history and rich culture, was part of Baiyue ethnic groups in the ancient time. In the first year of Daxing period of Eastern Jin Dynasty (AD 318), Jinxing County, established here as one of the county towns, ushered a history of 1700 years of Nanning organizational system. During the Zhenguan period of Tang dynasty (AD 632), it was renamed Yong prefecture (Yongzhou) and established Yongzhou government seat, which is why it has been called Yong (邕) for short. In the first year of Taiding period of Yuan dynasty (AD1318), Yongzhou was renamed Nanning, meaning the Pacified South.

Nanning was once the territory of the Baiyue people and became the capital of Jinxing Prefecture which was separated from Yulin Prefecture of the Eastern Jin Dynasty. In 1076 during the Lý–Song War Yongzhou was besieged by Lý forces. Under the leadership of Su Jian, the garrison held out for forty-two days before succumbing. The city was razed to the ground and its people massacred by Lý dynasty.

In the Yuan dynasty in 1324, it was renamed Nanning Lu (Nanning Circuit) of Yongzhou. Historically, Nanning was famous for trade, and had permanent business offices from other areas in China since the Song dynasty. In the Ming dynasty Nanning developed into an economic center of the Zuo River and the You River with the reputation of "Little Nanjing".

=== People's Republic era ===
On 4 December 1949, Nanning was captured by the Communist Party. in January 1950, Nanning municipality was set up, and identified as the capital city of Guangxi on 8 February of the same year; in March 1958, the Guangxi Zhuang Autonomous Region was established, and Nanning municipality was the capital city.

Nanning served as host for the annual China–ASEAN Expo (CASEAN Expo) which began in 2004. The city was also the venue for the 2006 World Robotics Olympiad.

== Administrative divisions ==
Nanning has jurisdiction over 7 districts, 1 county-level city, 4 counties, and 6 development zones. By the end of 2024, the registered population of the city is 8,267,900, including 4,503,400 in urban areas.

Map
Name	Chinese	Hanyu Pinyin	Zhuang	Population (2010)	Area (km^{2})	Density (/km^{2})
City proper
Xingning District	兴宁区	Xīngníng Qū	Singhningz Gih	398,789	722.68	551.82
Qingxiu District	青秀区	Qīngxiù Qū	Cinghsiu Gih	709,721	865.27	820.23
Jiangnan District	江南区	Jiāngnán Qū	Gyanghnanz Gih	567,999	1,183.26	480.03
Xixiangtang District	西乡塘区	Xīxiāngtáng Qū	Sihsienghdangz Gih	1,153,305	1,076.00	1071.84
Liangqing District	良庆区	Liángqìng Qū	Liengzcing Gih	344,768	1,368.88	251.86
Yongning District	邕宁区	Yōngníng Qū	Yunghningz Gih	259,721	1,230.73	211.03
Wuming District	武鸣区	Wǔmíng Qū	Vujmingz Gih	544,478	3,388.91	160.66
Suburban and satellite city
Hengzhou City	横州市	Héngzhōu Shì	Hwngzcouh Si	863,001	3,448.06	250.29
Rural
Long'an County	隆安县	Lóng'ān Xiàn	Lungzanh Yen	300,215	2,305.59	130.21
Mashan County	马山县	Mǎshān Xiàn	Majsanh Yen	390,900	2,340.76	167.00
Shanglin County	上林县	Shànglín Xiàn	Sanglinz Yen	343,590	1,871.00	183.64
Binyang County	宾阳县	Bīnyáng Xiàn	Binhyangz Yen	782,255	2,298.17	340.38
Total				6,658,742	22,099.31	301.30

Development Zones:

- Nanning High-Tech Business DZ (南宁高新技术产业开发区)
- Nanning Economic and technology DZ (南宁经济技术开发区)
- Nanning Overseas Chinese Investment Zone (南宁华侨投资区)
- Nanning Qingxiu Mountain Resort/ Tourism Area (南宁青秀山风景名胜旅游区)
- Nanning Xiangsi Lake New Area (南宁相思湖新区)
- Nanning Liujing Industrial Park (南宁六景工业园区)

== Cityscape ==
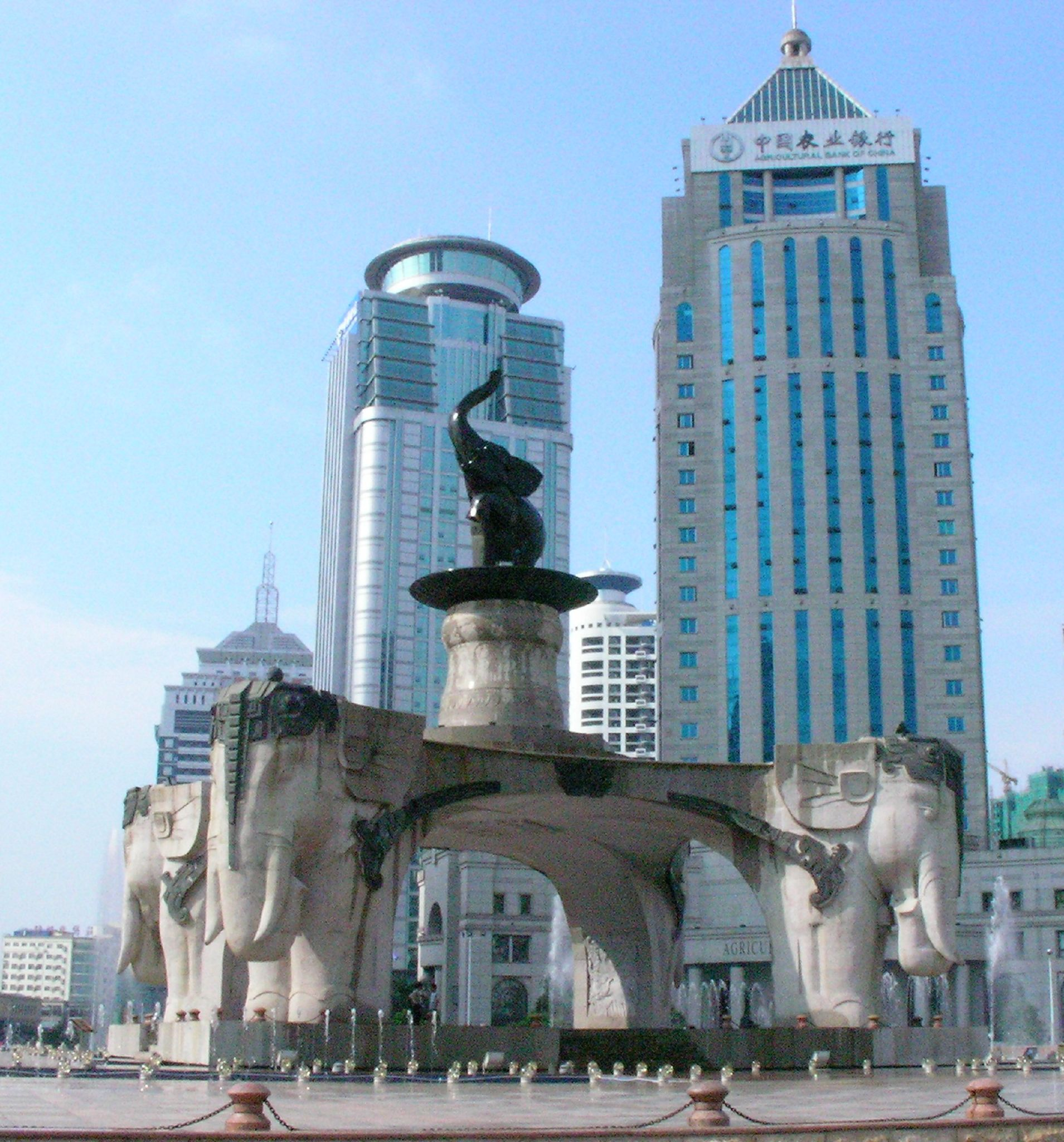
Elephant Fountain on Minzu Road

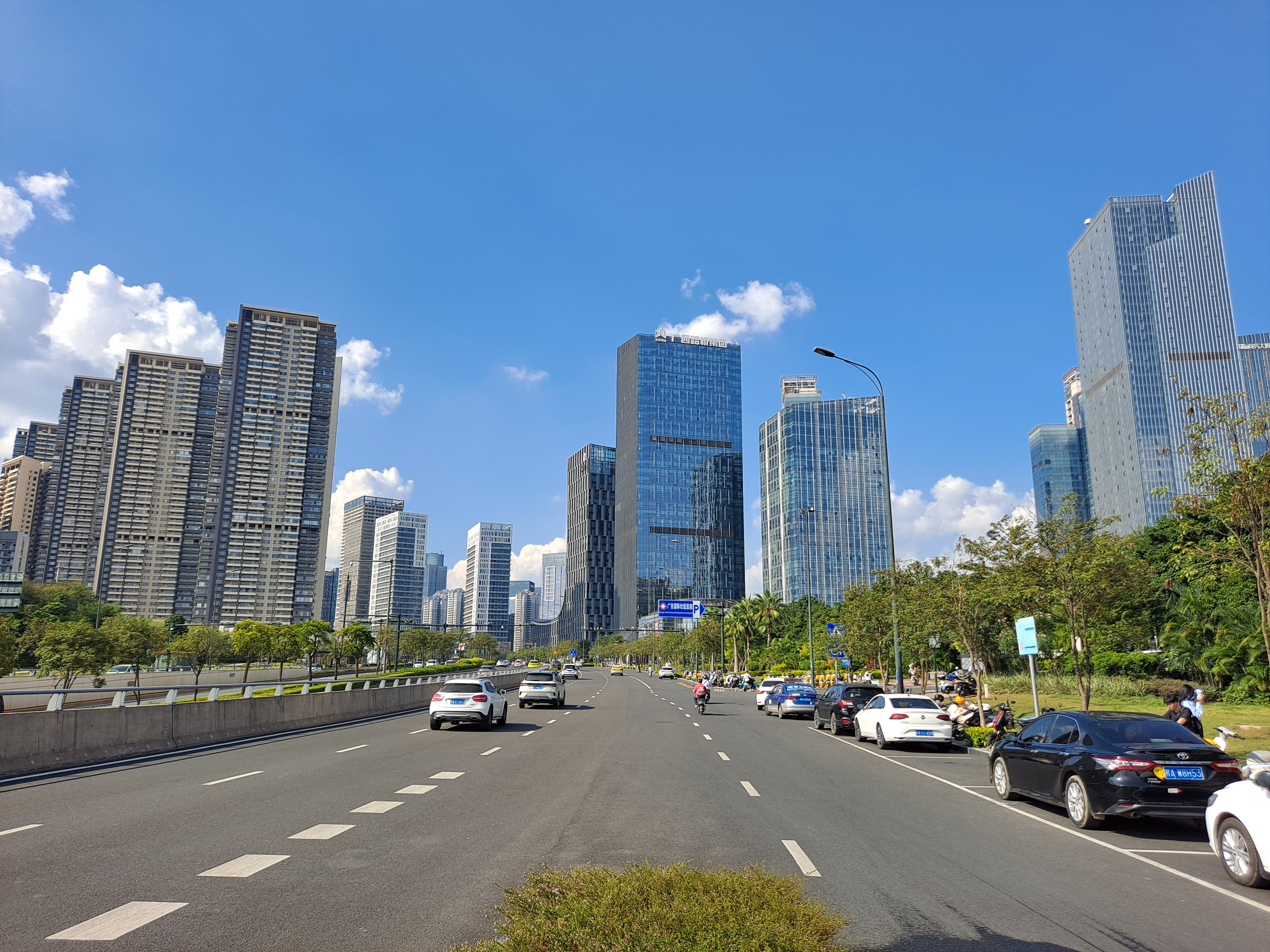
Nanning Wuxiang New Area

Nanning is home of the 22nd tallest building in the People's Republic of China, the Guangxi China Resources Tower, at 402.7 m (1,321 ft), currently the tallest building in Guangxi and in southwestern China outside of Chongqing.

Nanning has many parks with green landscapes, it is one of the "greenest" cities in China, and it's known as the "Green City"(绿城).

Recently, the government has begun a citywide beautification plan which aimed to further clean up the city and improve its image. This involved curtailing the number of street-side food vendors operating without proper licenses and restricting parking in busy streets. The program has achieved initial success, long-term efforts are still needed to deliver lasting results.

== Economy ==
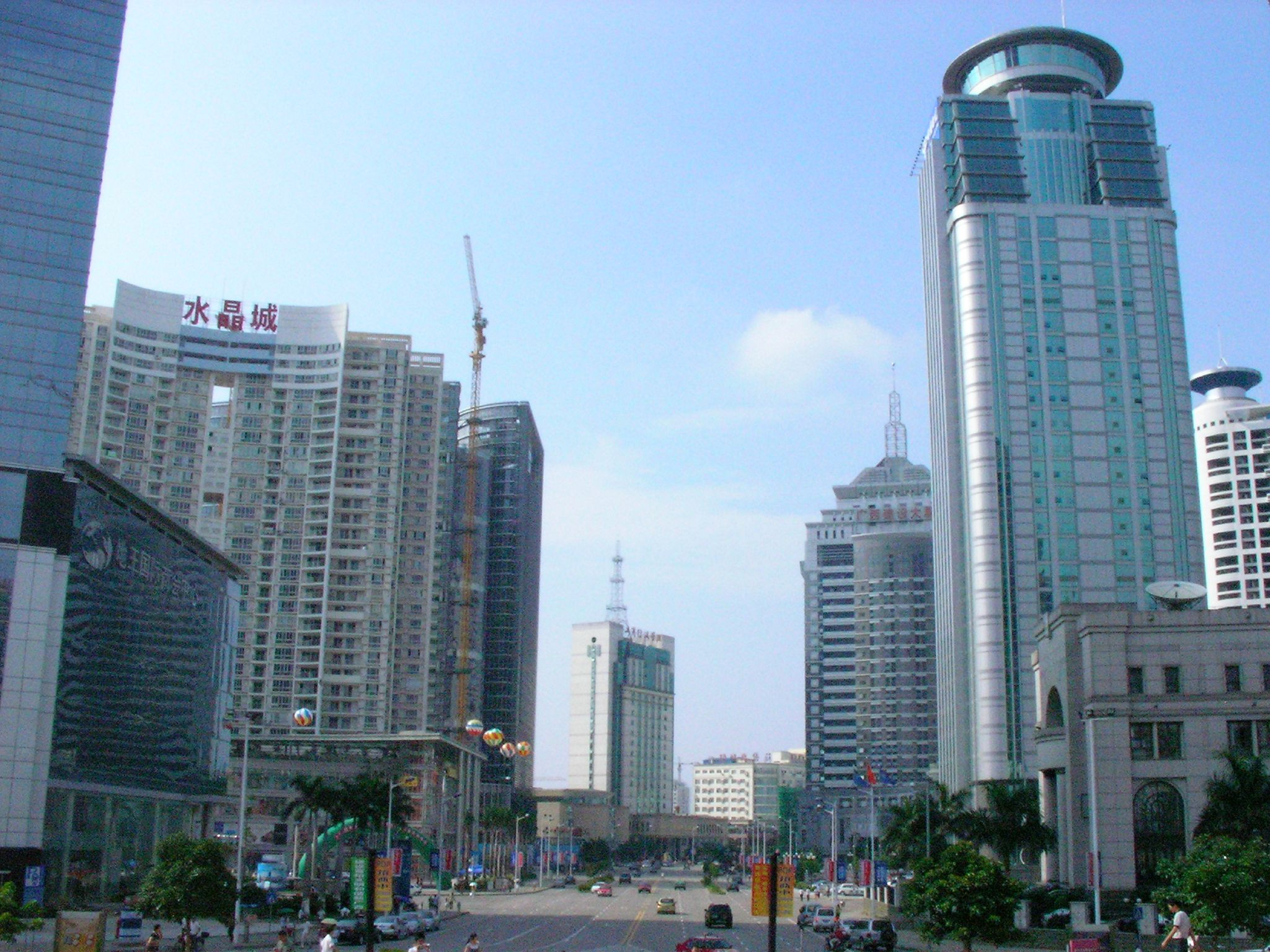
Nanning Street

Nanning's GDP in 2015 was 341 billion RMB. The GDP per capita was $7,844. Foreign exports in 2007 were US$10 billion. Foreign fixed asset investment was 34.3 billion RMB. Nanning has six development zones and industrial parks, three of which accounted for 6 billion RMB of Nanning's GDP, more than 8 percent of Nanning's total. Mineral resources include gold, iron, manganese, aluminum, quartz, silver, indium, coal, marble, and granite with a third of China's different types of mineral resources found in Nanning.

=== Industrial zones ===
- Nanning Economic & Technological Development Area

== Transportation ==
=== Metro ===
Metro map

Nanning Metro system is known for its Nanning Rail Transit (NNRT), expected to comprise a total of nine lines. The first was completed and put into operation in June 2016, the second began operation in December 2017. Line 3 began operation in 2019, and Line 4 began operation in 2020. Line 1 connects the East and West of Nanning, linking the financial and political center and the academic and research center of Nanning.

=== Air ===
- Nanning Wuxu International Airport

=== Rail ===
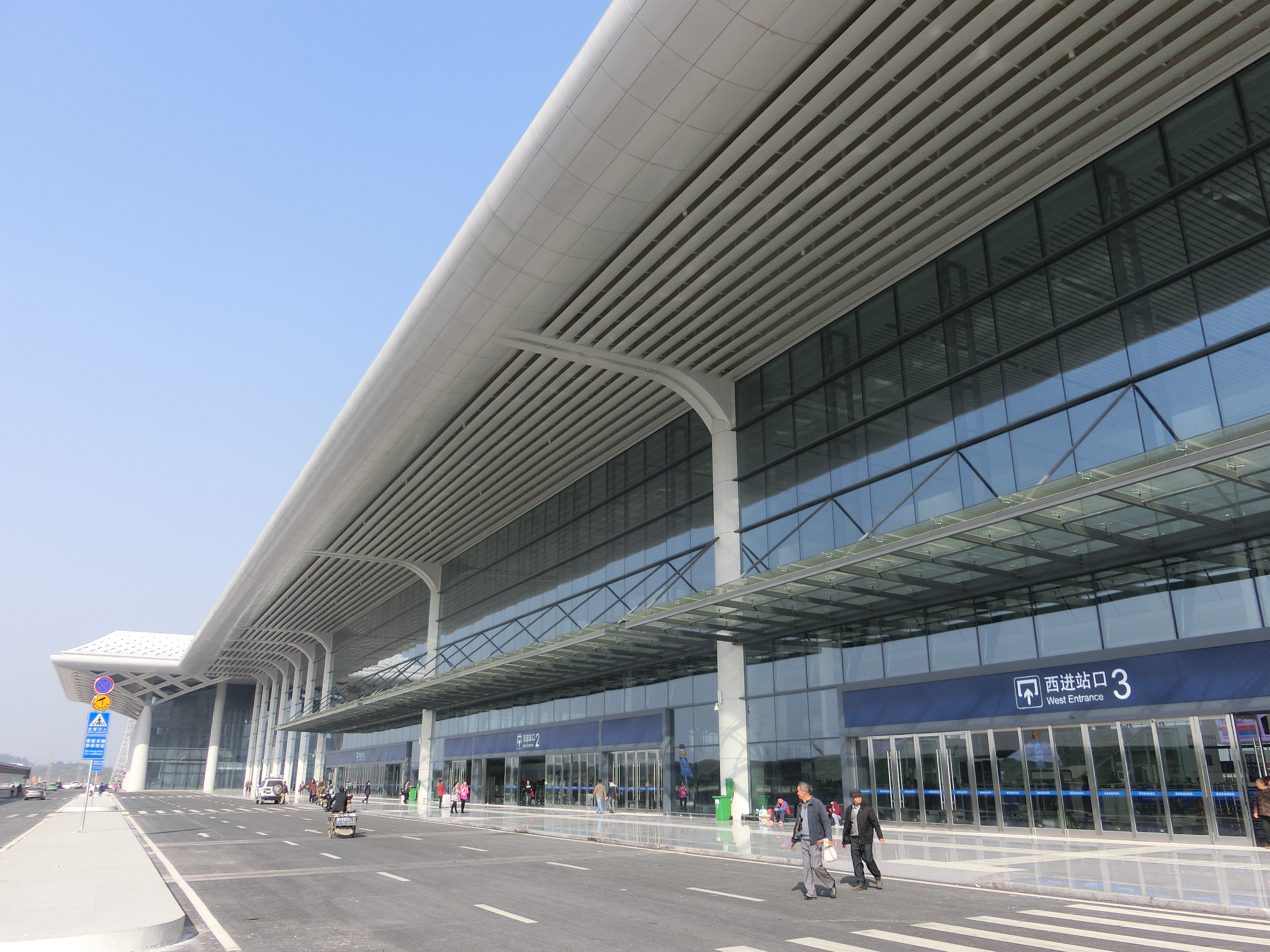
Nanning East Railway Station

Nanning has two major railway stations: Nanning railway station and Nanning East railway station. The latter one is newer and also the main destination of high-speed trains. A third, Nanning North railway station, is set to open in 2023 with the Guiyang–Nanning high-speed railway. Nanning railway station is a railway junction for the Nanning–Kunming, Nanning–Guangzhou and Hunan–Guangxi Railways. There are also plans to build a high-speed railway to Pingxiang on the Vietnamese border. The goal is to better integrate Pan-Pearl River Delta and southeast China with members of the ASEAN.

At the end of 2013, some high-speed service has been introduced on the Hunan–Guangxi railway and on the railway line that connects Nanning with Beihai (as well as its branch to Fangchenggang). Guangxi is also a conjunction of Guangzhou-Guiyang Highspeed Rail.

=== Highways ===
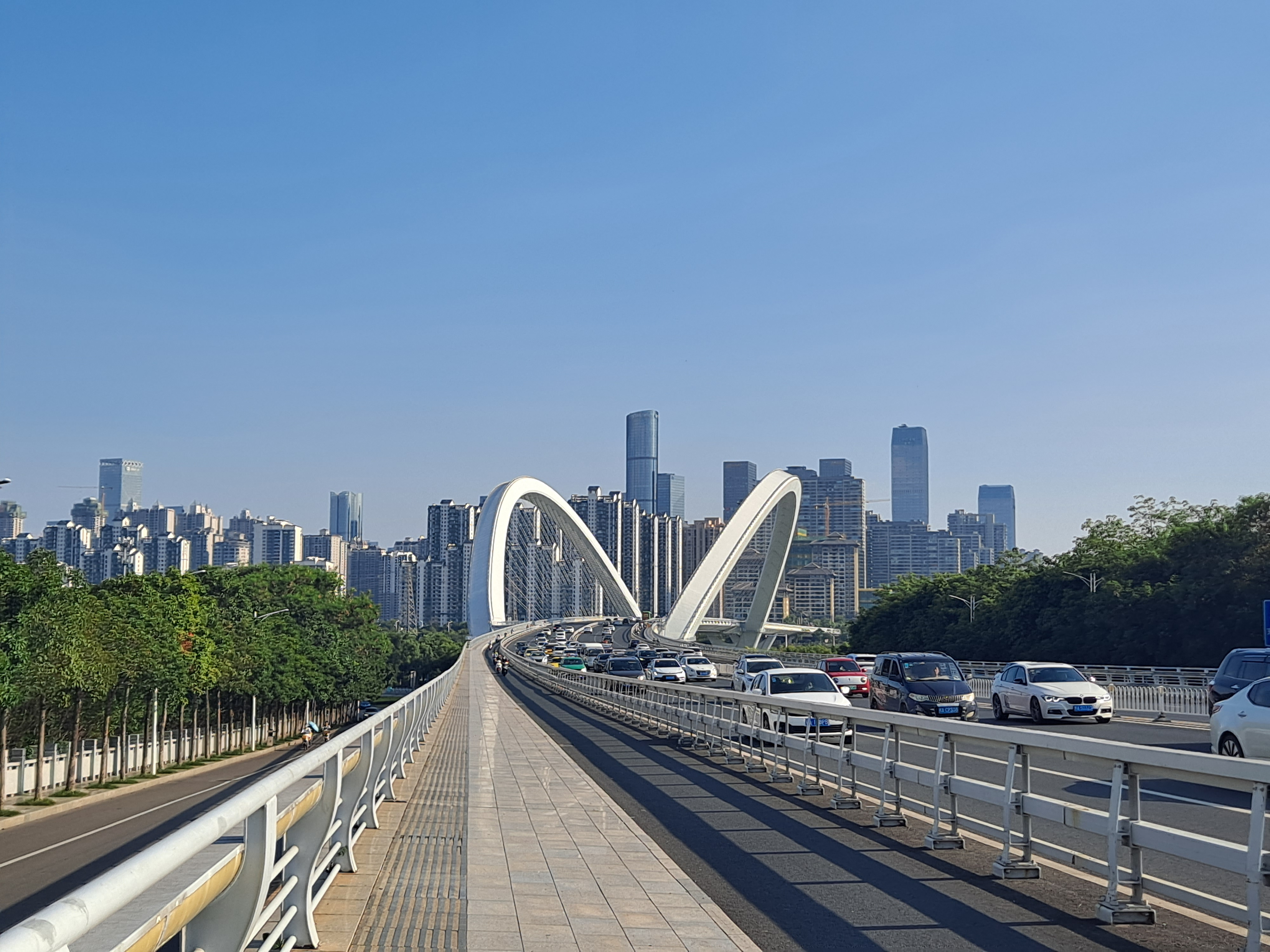
Nanning Bridge

- China National Highway 210
- China National Highway 322
- China National Highway 324
- China National Highway 325
- G72 Quanzhou–Nanning Expressway
- G7201 Nanning Ring Expressway
- G7211 Nanning–Youyiguan Expressway
- G75 Lanzhou–Haikou Expressway
- G80 Guangzhou–Kunming Expressway

== Geography ==
Nanning is located in the southern part of the Guangxi Zhuang Autonomous Region, 160 km (99 mi) from the border with Vietnam. It has an administrative area of 22,293 km^{2} (8,607 sq mi). Nanning is situated in a hilly basin with elevations between 70 and 500 m (230 and 1,640 ft) above sea-level. Qingxiu Mountain dominates the southern part of town.

=== Climate ===
Nanning has a warm, humid subtropical climate (Köppen Cfa), It borders the subtropical monsoon climate (Köppen Cwa) with an annual mean temperature of 22.3 °C (72.1 °F). Summers are hot and humid with July, the hottest month, having a 24-hour average temperature of 28.5 °C (83.3 °F). Winters are mild and dry with January, the coolest month, averaging 13.3 °C (55.9 °F). From May to October, rain is most frequent and relative humidity consistently averages above 60 percent; the annual rainfall is 1,286 millimetres (50.6 in). The area is also frost-free for all but 3 or 4 days a year and snowfall is virtually unheard of in the city, with only two exceptions since 1900: in December 1975 and in January 2016 snow fell on the city albeit without sticking to the ground. Extreme temperatures have ranged from −2.1 to 40.4 °C (28 to 105 °F) on 12 January 1955 and May 9, 1958 respectively. With monthly percent possible sunshine ranging from 15 percent in March to 51 percent in September, the city receives 1,579 hours of bright sunshine annually.

Climate data for Nanning, elevation 152 m (499 ft), (1991–2020 normals, extremes 1951–present)
Month	Jan	Feb	Mar	Apr	May	Jun	Jul	Aug	Sep	Oct	Nov	Dec	Year
Record high °C (°F)	32.6 (90.7)	36.2 (97.2)	35.5 (95.9)	39.0 (102.2)	40.4 (104.7)	38.9 (102.0)	39.4 (102.9)	39.1 (102.4)	38.2 (100.8)	36.5 (97.7)	34.0 (93.2)	30.5 (86.9)	40.4 (104.7)
Mean daily maximum °C (°F)	16.9 (62.4)	19.0 (66.2)	21.7 (71.1)	27.2 (81.0)	30.7 (87.3)	32.2 (90.0)	32.8 (91.0)	32.9 (91.2)	31.7 (89.1)	28.7 (83.7)	24.5 (76.1)	19.5 (67.1)	26.5 (79.7)
Daily mean °C (°F)	12.8 (55.0)	14.8 (58.6)	17.8 (64.0)	22.7 (72.9)	26.1 (79.0)	27.8 (82.0)	28.3 (82.9)	28.0 (82.4)	26.7 (80.1)	23.4 (74.1)	19.1 (66.4)	14.5 (58.1)	21.8 (71.3)
Mean daily minimum °C (°F)	10.0 (50.0)	12.0 (53.6)	15.0 (59.0)	19.5 (67.1)	22.7 (72.9)	24.9 (76.8)	25.2 (77.4)	24.9 (76.8)	23.3 (73.9)	19.8 (67.6)	15.5 (59.9)	11.0 (51.8)	18.7 (65.6)
Record low °C (°F)	−2.1 (28.2)	−1.2 (29.8)	3.7 (38.7)	9.2 (48.6)	13.5 (56.3)	18.2 (64.8)	19.7 (67.5)	19.9 (67.8)	15.4 (59.7)	6.9 (44.4)	0.7 (33.3)	−1.9 (28.6)	−2.1 (28.2)
Average precipitation mm (inches)	43.2 (1.70)	31.8 (1.25)	67.0 (2.64)	75.4 (2.97)	159.9 (6.30)	215.6 (8.49)	245.3 (9.66)	188.4 (7.42)	115.4 (4.54)	64.6 (2.54)	45.6 (1.80)	33.6 (1.32)	1,285.8 (50.63)
Average precipitation days (≥ 0.1 mm)	10.2	10.3	14.4	11.4	14.5	16.3	16.2	14.9	9.9	6.5	6.4	7.1	138.1
Average relative humidity (%)	78	79	82	80	79	82	82	82	79	75	75	74	79
Mean monthly sunshine hours	63.7	59.8	53.3	97.7	144.0	145.4	178.9	181.0	176.1	163.3	129.9	108.0	1,501.1
Percentage possible sunshine	19	19	14	26	35	36	43	46	48	46	40	32	34
Source: China Meteorological Administration all-time extreme temperature Pogodaiklimat.ru (extremes)all-time October record high

=== Flora and fauna ===
Nanning's warm climate gives it a large amount of biodiversity. There are many species of animals and more than 3,000 species of plants. The city flower is the Jaba flower, an evergreen shrub, and the city tree is the almond tree which is regarded as the backbone tree used for greening and landscaping throughout the city.

== Twin towns – sister cities ==
Nanning is twinned with:

- Akita, Japan (2021)
- Antananarivo, Madagascar (2015)
- (The Gambia) Banjul, Gambia (1987)
- Kangar, Malaysia (2002)
- Bogor, Indonesia (2008)
- Bundaberg, Australia (1998)
- Champasak, Laos (2010)
- Commerce City, United States (2009)
- Crema, Italy (2016)
- Davao City, Philippines (2007)
- Grudziądz, Poland (2011)
- Gwacheon, South Korea (2005)
- Haiphong, Vietnam (2006)
- Iquique, Chile (2008)
- Ivano-Frankivsk, Ukraine (2019)
- Khon Kaen, Thailand (2002)
- Klagenfurt, Austria (2002)
- Lilongwe, Malawi (2011)
- Provo, United States (2000)
- Sihanoukville, Cambodia (2007)
- Val-de-Marne, France (2008)
- Yangon, Myanmar (2009)

== Demographics ==
As of the 2020 Chinese census, Nanning had a population of 8,741,584, of which 5,293,359 live in its built-up (or metro) area made of 6 urban districts, Wuming District not being conurbated yet. Nanning is a city in which Zhuang ethnic group live in compact communities. Thirty-five ethnic groups live in compact communities in Nanning, including people of Zhuang, Han, Yao, Hui, Miao, Dong, and Man minorities.

== Culture ==
Nanning is the center of science and technology, education, culture and health in Guangxi Zhuang Autonomous Region. There are altogether 54 scientific research institutes subordinate to districts. 10 colleges and 50 trade schools are training specialised personnel of all kinds. Now there are 62 mass cultural organizations, 13 performing groups, 8 cinemas, 285 projecting units, over 70 karaoke halls and over 1000 newsstands. Bookshops and cultural markets can be found everywhere.

=== Food ===
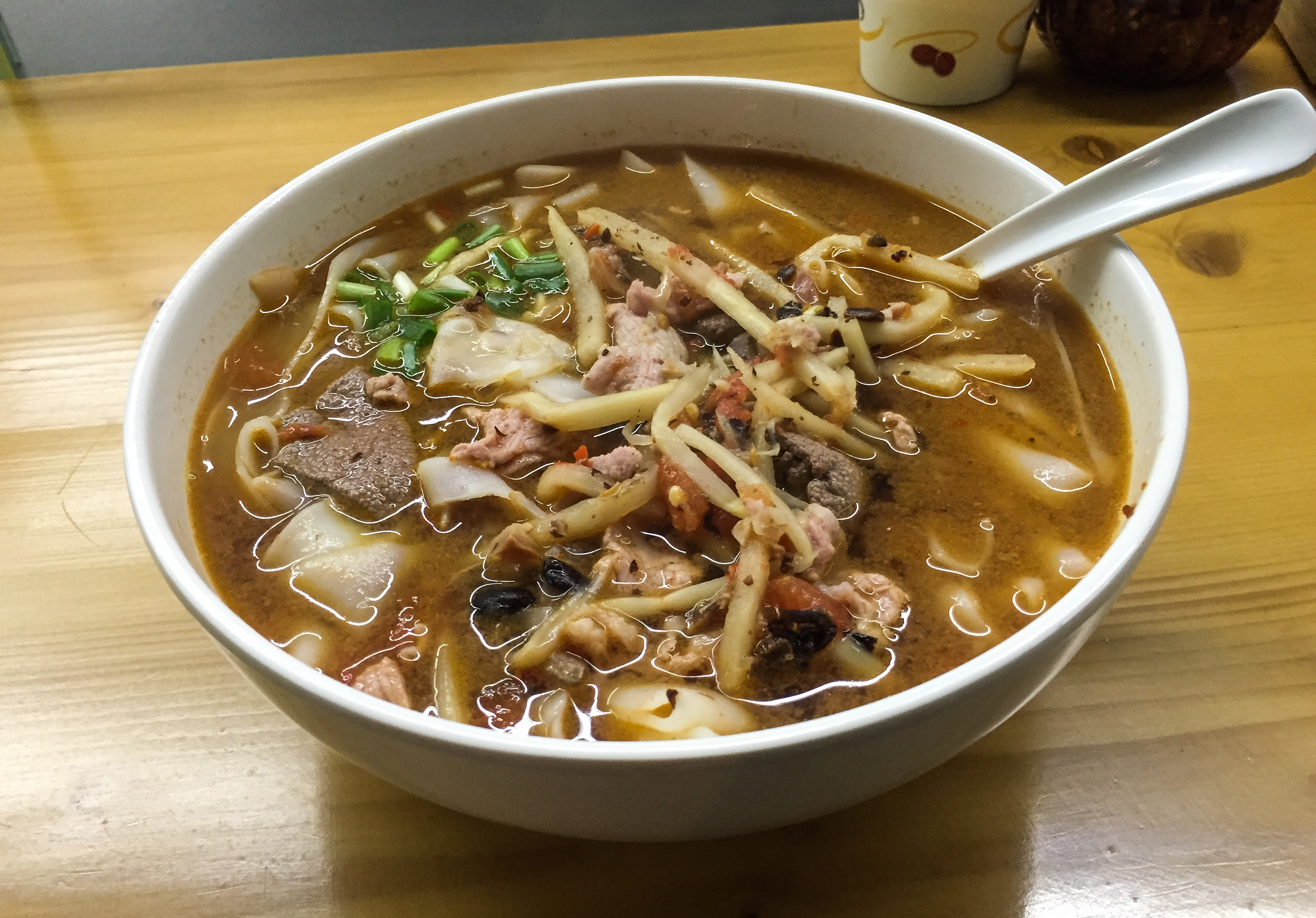
Laoyou rice noodles

Nanning has not only local cuisine but also food from other areas of China and abroad. Traditional food culture can be found around most streets of Nanning. Nanning food shares the style of Cantonese food and of Southeast Asia. Chinese cuisine including Guangdong, Sichuan, Hunan and Jiangsu as well as Japanese, Thai and Western cuisines can be found.

Rice noodles are popular among the Nanning people. Laoyou rice noodles are the most famous, while other noodle dishes such as Guilin rice noodles and hand made noodles are common. Laoyou rice noodles (means old friend rice noodles) are made of fry up pepper, sour bamboo shoots, black beans and garlic, then pork, and then soup and rice noodles. The sour-spicy tasting noodles are a popular and cheap favorite street food for all meals (breakfast, lunch and dinner) in Nanning.

The dish, Lemon duck, is originally from Nanning.

== Tourism ==
Nanning is close to scenic Guilin, with its world-famous hillscape, northern and western Guangxi and its minority villages, and the border with Vietnam in the south. Tourist attractions in Nanning include Guangxi Museum, People's Park with the Zhenning Fort, Mount Qingxiu, Guangxi Medicinal Herb Botanical Garden, and Yangmei Ancient Town. Other places of interest include Nanhu Park, Shishan Park and Nanning Zoo.

== Colleges and universities ==
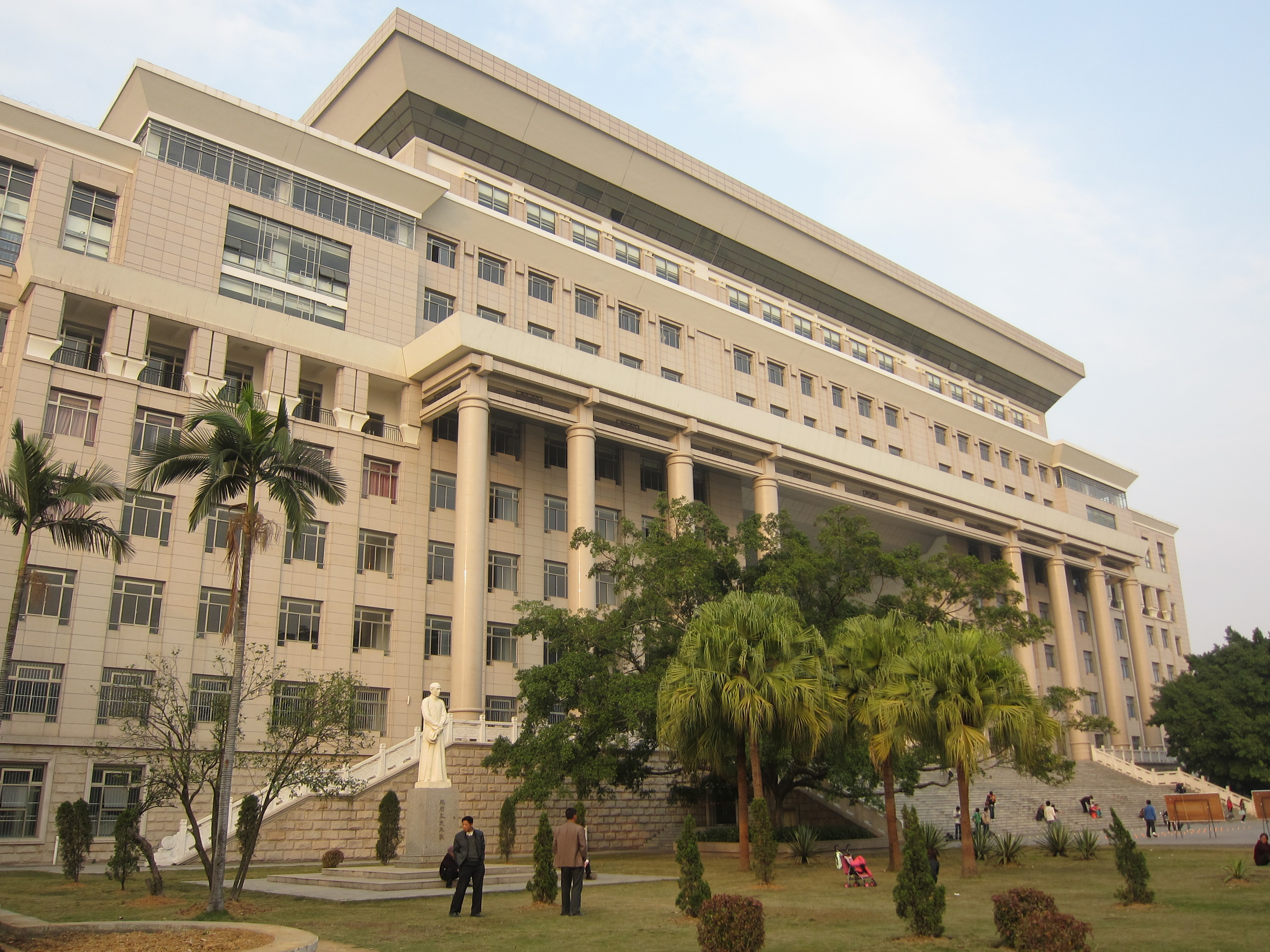
Guangxi University

As of 2025, Nanning is ranked one of the top 150 science cities in the world by scientific research outputs, as tracked by the Nature Index.

- Nanning University (南宁学院)
- Nanning Normal University (南宁师范大学)
- Guangxi University (广西大学)
- Guangxi Arts College (广西艺术学院)
- Guangxi Medical University (广西医科大学)
- Guangxi University for Nationalities (广西民族大学)
- Guangxi University of Chinese Medicine (广西中医药大学)
- Guangxi University of Finance and Economics (广西财经学院)
- Guangxi Police College (广西警察学院)

Note: Institutions without full-time bachelor programs are not listed.

== Notable people ==
- Deng Yingchao; politician, wife of Zhou Enlai
- Shao Changchun; unaffiliated event organizer, violin maker, and academician
- Wang Ou; actress and model
- Zhou Mi; badminton player

== See also ==
- People's Hospital of Guangxi Zhuang Autonomous Region
- Silver Lining Foundation
