= Guangxi Arts University =

Art school in Guangxi, China

- 广西艺术学院
- Type: Public
- Established: 1938
- President: Huang Gesheng
- Location: 7th Jiaoyu Road, Nanning, Guangxi 530022, China; 22°48′20″N 108°20′08″E
- Campus: Urban
- Website: www.gxau.edu.cn

Guangxi Arts University (GXAU), formerly known as Guangxi Arts Institute (Chinese: 广西艺术学院; pinyin: Guǎngxī Yìshù Xuéyuàn), is an art school located in the city of Nanning, the capital of Guangxi Zhuang Autonomous Region in China.

== Location ==
It occupies an area of 107,400 square meters on the border of Nanhu lake, spread over two campuses. Its address is seventh Jiaoyu Road, Nanning, Guangxi 530022 P.R. China.

== History ==
Guangxi Arts Institute was founded in 1938. It is one of the six provincial comprehensive arts institutions of higher learning in China and the only comprehensive arts institute in Guangxi.

== Faculty and colleges ==
The university has seven colleges: the College of Fine Arts, the College of Design, the Guilin Academy of Chinese Painting, the College of Music, the College of Dance, the College of Humanities and the College of Film, Television and Communication. It has an affiliated middle school. The institute offers 13 undergraduate programs and 42 majors. The programs include fine arts, painting, sculpture, advertisement, animation, art design, musicology, composition and composition theories, dance, dance choreography, dance performance, and broadcasting and anchoring. The institute is authorized to confer master's degrees in musicology, fine arts and design with 42 directions.

The president is Mr. Huang Gesheng, a famous Chinese painting artist. The institute has a faculty of 418, of whom 37 are professors, 104 associate professors and 79 supervisors master candidates.

Teaching facilities include painting studios, piano rooms, a concert hall, a rehearsal hall, a multimedia classroom, computer classrooms, specialized labs, teaching studios, and computer music studios.

Its provincial key research bases of Guangxi Ethnic Minority Traditional Arts Research Center, Lijiang Painting Style Research Center, and the Comics and Animation Research Center provide excellent places for teaching and practice. The education provided by the institute is personalized and imbued with distinct local and ethnic features. The Lijiang painting style, with Huang as its chairman and art professors as its main members, is influential in China and abroad.

== Awards and recognition ==
Guangxi Arts University ranks highly among art schools of the same kind in China. In the national undergraduate Education Level Evaluation carried out by the Ministry of Education, GXAI was awarded the Excellent grade. It carries out cooperative programs and cultural exchanges with art institutions in Thailand and Vietnam, as well as with many universities in the U.S., Russia, Canada, and Ukraine. Delegations from the institute have been invited to institutions abroad as well.
