= Guangxi Medical University =

Medical school in Nanning, China

- 广西医科大学
- Motto: 厚德励志 博学弘医
- Type: Public
- Established: 1934; 92 years ago
- Academic affiliations: ASRMU
- Budget: ¥1.32 billion (2026)
- President: Lu Decheng
- Faculty: 2,494 (Spring 2026)
- Total staff: 4,467 (Spring 2026)
- Students: 64,516 (Spring 2026)
- Undergraduates: 19,295 (Spring 2026)
- Postgraduates: 8,843 (Spring 2026)
- Doctoral students: 1,174 (Spring 2026)
- Location: Nanning, Guangxi, China
- Campus: Multiple sites
- Website: www.gxmu.edu.cn

Chinese name
- Simplified Chinese: 广西医科大学
- Traditional Chinese: 廣西醫科大學
Transcriptions
Standard Mandarin
- Hanyu Pinyin: Guǎngxī Yīkē Dàxué

Guangxi Medical University (GXMU) is located in Nanning, Guangxi, China and is one of the oldest higher education medical institutions in China. In 2010, the university was voted one of the top 20 universities in China for medicine study. Clinical medicine field by the university is categorized as world's top 1%, according to Thomson Reuters Web of Science Essential Science Indicators.

== History ==
The university was established in Nanning, Guangxi on 21 November 1934 as the Guangxi Provincial Medical School (广西省立医学院), and the campus was moved to Guilin in November 1949, shortly after the establishment of the People's Republic of China.

Established in 1934, the university is one of the first universities in China to accept international students into its English-language medical education program, which is limited only to clinical medicine (临床医学). Foreign students on scholarship are required to study all their courses in Mandarin Chinese

== Campus ==
The campus has a total area of 400,000 square meters, which includes teaching buildings and dormitories for Chinese students, international students and teaching staff, a library, food halls, an indoor tennis hall, a swimming pool and laboratories.

The campus is located near the First Affiliated Hospital of Guangxi Medical University (广西医科大学一附院), which is the largest hospital in Guangxi Zhuang Autonomous Region, and the Institute of Dentistry (口腔学院).

== Programmes ==
There are nine five-year undergraduate programs offered by the Guangxi Medical University, including clinical medicine, preventive medicine, stomatology, pharmacy, nursing, dentistry, and seven three-year college specialties including nursing, pharmacy, community medical care and cosmetology.

International education has shown a rapid development since the university begin to accept international students, whether for language study or enrolling in clinical medicine program, which offers the MBBS title for undergraduate students. Most international students come from Vietnam, which is a one-hour bus ride from Nanning. Vietnamese students primarily attend Chinese-language classes. International students who attend the English-language classes come from India, Indonesia, Nepal, and Mauritius. Lately there are international students from Somalia, Yemen, Kenya, Nigeria, Namibia, Thailand, and Libya.

In September 2008, the clinical medicine in English program was altered as a six-year programme.

== Clinical Research ==
In the research field of Clinical Medicine, Guangxi Medical University ranks top 1% among institutions globally, according to Thomson Reuters Web of Science Essential Science Indicators. Clinical research papers by first or corresponding authors from Guangxi Medical University have been published in The New England Journal of Medicine, Nature Biotechnology, and Nature Genetics.

== Partner Institution ==
=== United States ===
- Temple University

=== Malaysia ===
- Universiti Tunku Abdul Rahman

== See also ==
- People's Hospital of Guangxi Zhuang Autonomous Region
