= Expressways of Vietnam =

Expressway network of Vietnam (Hệ thống đường cao tốc Việt Nam)
- Highway shield of the North–South Expressway East and North–South Expressway West

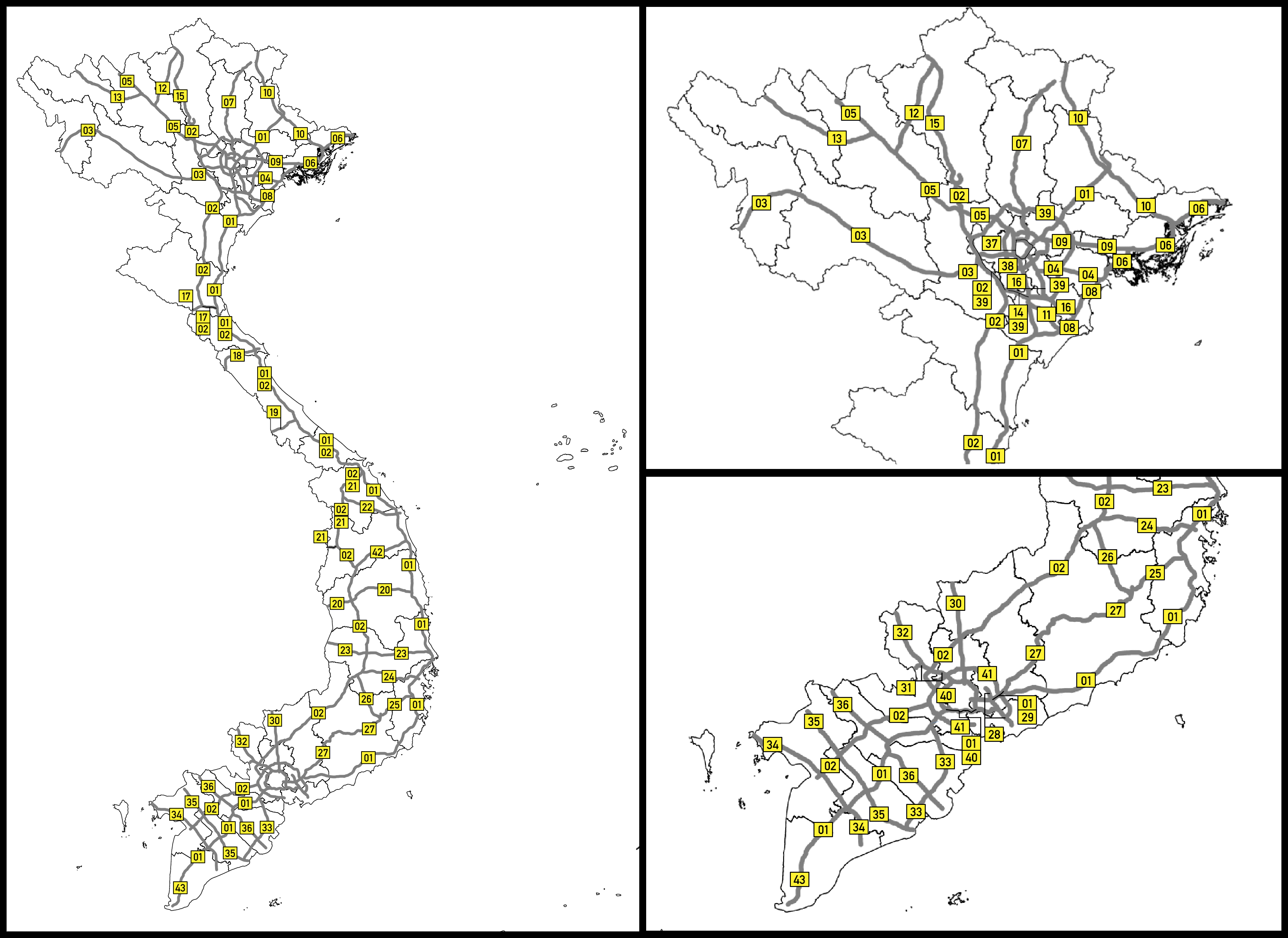

System information
- Maintained by Vietnam Expressway Corp (VEC), Deo Ca Group, Son Hai Ltd. and others
- Length: 10,106 km (6,280 mi)
- Formed: 2002

Highway names
- Expressways: Đường Cao Tốc nn (CT.nn)
- National Roads: Quốc Lộ nn (QL.nn)

System links
- Transport in Vietnam

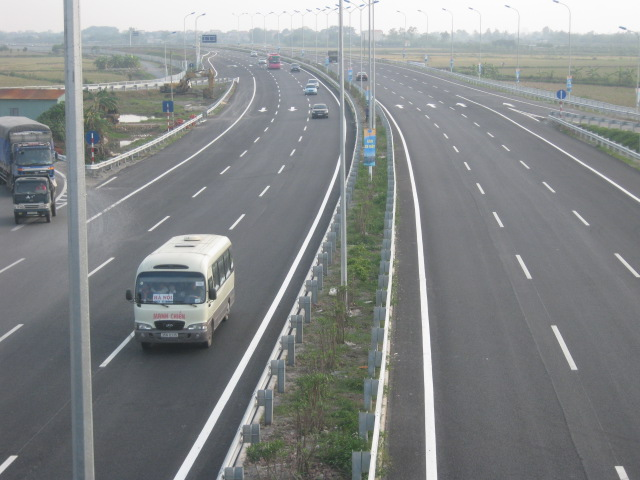
Hanoi–Ninh Bình Expressway, part of the North–South Expressway East

The expressway network of Vietnam is a network of expressways stretching from North to South and from East to West in Vietnam and belongs to the Transport in Vietnam system. The first expressways were opened in the 1998. As of 2024, the entire Vietnamese expressway system has been opened to traffic with 2,021 kilometres (1,256 mi) and is investing in building about 1,542 kilometres (958 mi). It is expected that by the end of 2025 there will be about 3,000 kilometres (1,900 mi) of expressway and by 2030 it will reach 5,000 kilometres (3,100 mi).

== History of formation and development ==
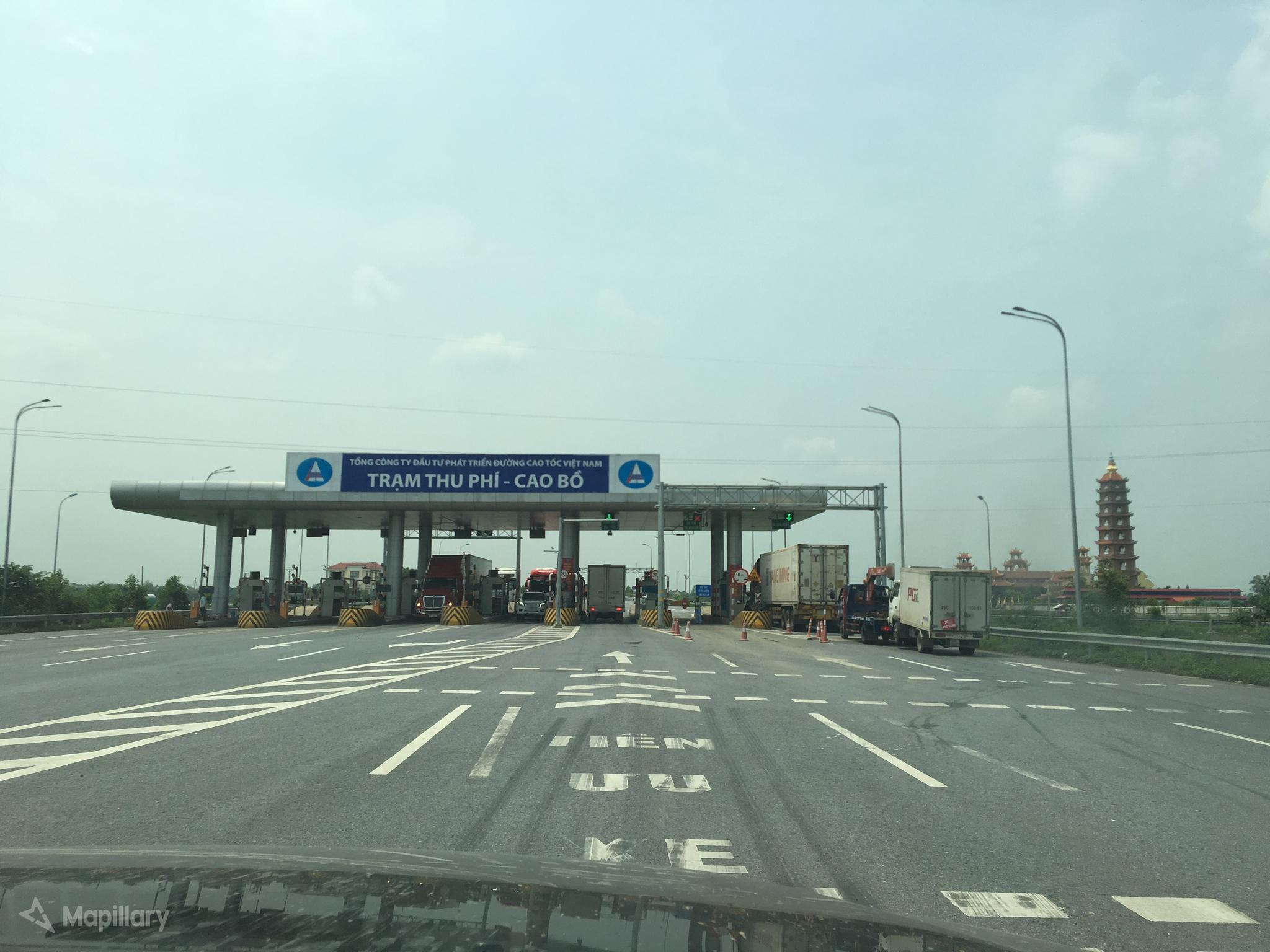
Toll booth in Ninh Bình

The idea of building an expressway emerged around 2010 when the number of private cars increased rapidly, while many national highways such as National Route 1, National Route 5, National Highway 51, ... are overloaded. However, the expansion potential of some of these highways (especially those in the North) is limited because people live concentratedly on both sides of the road, so the cost of land clearance is very high, and some highways share corridors with corresponding railway lines. In addition, some national highways in the northern mountainous region cannot be expanded due to terrain. The construction of the expressway system in Vietnam aims to separate cars, non-stop passenger cars and long-distance trucks from the traffic flow of rudimentary vehicles, 2- and 3-wheel vehicles, enabling long-distance vehicles to run faster and safer.

The predecessors of today's expressways were bypasses built parallel to the main roads, outside the densely populated areas of the city. Among them, the old National Route 1 bypasses, Phap Van – Cau Gie road (now Phap Van - Cau Gie expressway), Phap Van – Bac Giang section (now part of Ring Road 3 Hanoi and North–South Expressway East) and National Route 18 Noi Bai – Bac Ninh section (later Noi Bai-Bac Ninh expressway) were all completed in 1998. At that time, these routes were only bypasses of the respective national routes and did not meet expressway standards.

On 3 February 2010, the Ho Chi Minh City–Trung Luong Expressway was completed and put into use, helping to reduce the load on National Route 1, Ho Chi Minh City – My Tho section. This is the first route to be recognized as an expressway in Vietnam.

In 2019, the Ministry of Transport decided to exclude foreign investors from bidding on the North–south expressway, mainly to prevent Chinese companies from participating. Public backslash – due to strong anti-Chinese sentiment in the country – was feared if Chinese companies would collect toll fees, as well national security concerns playing a role in this decision. However, lack of bidders has led to low competition between the bids, and two out of five sections had not attracted any bids.

In 2020, Minister of Planning and Investment Nguyễn Chí Dũng petitioned to the National Assembly to switch development of the remaining sections of the North–South expressway to state funding instead of build-operate-transfer (BOT) contracts, to avoid delays in raising capital and to reduce interest amount. He noted that Chinese provinces Yunnan and Guangxi built 2,000 kilometres (1,243 mi) of expressways in three years, whereas 1,300 kilometres (808 mi) of planned expressway in Vietnam should have been completed decades ago. Since then, a series of expressways have been deployed and built, of which the most prominent are the North–South Expressway East, Hanoi–Haiphong Expressway, Hanoi-Lao Cai Expressway, Ho Chi Minh City-Long Thanh-Dau Giay Expressway, ...

On 9 January 2021, the Prime Minister issued Decision No. 1454/QD-TTg approving the Road Network Development Plan for the 2021–2030 period, with a vision to 2050. The decision was signed by Deputy Prime Minister Lê Văn Thành on behalf of the Prime Minister. Accordingly, the number of expressways was increased to 41 with a total length of more than 9,000 kilometres (5,592 mi).

In a 2023 directive, Prime Minister Phạm Minh Chính instructed the Ministry of Transport to develop expressway design standards, as some of the expressways did not adhere to standards generally followed for expressways such as number of lanes, road width, operating speed and having continuous emergency lanes.

On 3 January 2025, Deputy Prime Minister Trần Hồng Hà signed Decision No. 12/QD-TTg approving the adjustment of the Road Network Planning for the period 2021 – 2030, with a vision to 2050. Accordingly, the Decision added two new routes: Quang Ngai-Kon Tum Expressway and Ca Mau-Dat Mui Expressway . Increase the total number of expressways to 43 with a total length of more than 9,200 kilometres (5,717 mi)

Standardization of expressways is not yet fully implemented. Ownership varies depending on the expressway, they are financed, developed, owned and operated by public or private companies on behalf of the state. For example, state-owned Vietnam Expressway Corporation (VEC) owns and operates four expressways, but toll collection is done by subcontracted companies. The companies operating the expressways have to report traffic numbers and toll revenue to the Ministry of Transport and the Directorate for Roads of Vietnam. This construction has been subject of fraud investigations several times, as toll revenue was falsified by the collecting companies to take advantage of the difference. The government has also threatened operating companies to revoke their toll collection licence after lack of maintenance caused dangerous situations on several expressways. In 2019 it was reported that the Vietnam Expressway Corporation was US$3.7 billion in debt, and earning $137 million in revenue each year.

== Standard ==
=== Expressway ===
Expressway reassurance marker with minimum and maximum speed limits (IE.452)

On 31 March 2024, the Ministry of Transport issued Circular No. 06/TT-BGTVT (National Technical Regulation on Expressway QCVN 115:2024/BGTVT) and effective from 1 October 2024. Accordingly, the design speed of the expressway is divided into 3 speed levels as follows:

- 120 kilometres per hour (75 mph)
- 100 kilometres per hour (62 mph)
- 80 kilometres per hour (50 mph). For places with especially difficult terrain, related to national defense and security factors, a design speed of 60 kilometres per hour (37 mph) is allowed.

Expressways invested after the effective date must have a minimum scale of 4 lanes, with continuous emergency lanes along the entire route (except for the following locations: bridges with spans of 150m or more, tunnels and bridges with piers 50m or more high, with acceleration and deceleration lanes and auxiliary climbing lanes).

=== Symbol ===
North–South Expressway East route sign

The sign is designed on a rectangle with a yellow background, black border and the route number is displayed after the letters "CT". Signs are often placed in many different locations. Signs are placed at intersections between expressways and other roads. Second, they are displayed on signs located at intersections with other major roads and highways so that road users can know which way to go and follow the chosen route. Third, they can be displayed on large green signs indicating upcoming intersections on highways, and also on large green signs indicating when a highway has been entered or exited.

== List of expressways ==
=== Expressways network planning in 2026 ===
==== North–south expressway ====
Number	Name	Length	Lanes	Notes
CT.01	North–South Expressway East	2,158 kilometres (1,341 mi)	4–10	Completed many expressway sections. Will connect to China's G7211 by Friendship International Border Gate.
CT.02	North–South Expressway West	1,249 kilometres (776 mi)	4–6	Completed many expressway sections

==== Northern regional expressway ====
Number	Name	Length	Lanes	Notes
CT.03	Hanoi–Hoa Binh–Son La–Dien Bien Expressway	450 kilometres (280 mi)	4–6	Completed Hoa Lac-Hoa Binh expressway first stage Completed Thang Long Boulevard expressway section Hoa Binh-Moc Chau section under construction
CT.04	Hanoi–Haiphong Expressway	105 kilometres (65 mi)	6	Fully opened; formerly National Route 5B
CT.05	Hanoi–Lao Cai Expressway	264 kilometres (164 mi)	6	Fully opened. Connects to China's G8011 by Kim Thanh International Border Gate, expanding Yen bai - Lao cai section
CT.06	Haiphong–Ha Long–Van Don–Mong Cai Expressway	175 kilometres (109 mi)	6	Fully opened. Connects to China's G7511 by Bac Luan 2 Border Gate.
CT.07	Hanoi–Thai Nguyen–Bac Kan–Cao Bang Expressway	227 kilometres (141 mi)	4–6	Hanoi–Thai Nguyen section complete
CT.08	Ninh Binh–Haiphong Expressway	109 kilometres (68 mi)	6	Under construction
CT.09	Noi Bai–Bac Ninh–Ha Long Expressway	146 kilometres (91 mi)	6	Noi Bai–Bac Ninh section complete
CT.10	Tien Yen–Lang Son–Cao Bang Expressway	215 kilometres (134 mi)	4	Tan Thanh–Phúc Sen section under construction; Phúc Sen–Trà Lĩnh to begin construction after phase one is complete. Will connect to China's G69 by Tra Linh Border Gate.
CT.11	Phu Ly–Nam Dinh Expressway	50 kilometres (31 mi)	4	Proposed
CT.12	Northern mountain belt Expressway	327 kilometres (203 mi)	4	Proposed
CT.13	Bao Ha–Lai Chau Expressway	203 kilometres (126 mi)	4	Proposed
CT.14	Cho Ben–Yen My Expressway	45 kilometres (28 mi)	4	Proposed
CT.15	Tuyen Quang–Ha Giang Expressway	165 kilometres (103 mi)	4	Under construction. Will connect to China's G5615 by Thanh Thuy International Border Gate.
CT.16	Hung Yen–Thai Binh Expressway	70 kilometres (43 mi)	4	Proposed
CT.43	Northern midland belt Expressway	378 kilometres (235 mi)	4	Proposed

==== Central regional expressway ====
Number	Name	Length	Lanes	Notes
CT.17	Vinh–Thanh Thuy Expressway	85 kilometres (53 mi)	6	Proposed
CT.18	Vung Ang–Cha Lo Expressway	95 kilometres (59 mi)	4	Proposed
CT.19	Cam Lo–Lao Bao Expressway	70 kilometres (43 mi)	4	Funding phase Was CT.11 before 2021
CT.20	Quy Nhon–Pleiku–Le Thanh Expressway	230 kilometres (140 mi)	4	Quy nhon - Pleiku: Under construction Was CT.12 before 2021
CT.21	Da Nang–Thach My–Ngoc Hoi–Bo Y Expressway	176 kilometres (109 mi)	4	Proposed
CT.22	Quang Nam–Quang Ngai Expressway	100 kilometres (62 mi)	4	Proposed
CT.23	Phu Yen–Dak Lak Expressway	207 kilometres (129 mi)	4	Proposed
CT.24	Khanh Hoa–Buon Ma Thuot Expressway	130 kilometres (81 mi)	4	Under construction
CT.25	Nha Trang–Lien Khuong Expressway	98 kilometres (61 mi)	4	Proposed
CT.26	Phan Rang–Lien Khuong–Buon Ma Thuot Expressway	184 kilometres (114 mi)	4	Proposed
CT.42	Quang Ngai – Kon Tum Expressway	136 kilometres (85 mi)	4	Planned
CT.44	Ha Tinh–Cau Treo Expressway	85 kilometres (53 mi)	4-6	Planned
CT.45	Hue–A Luoi Expressway	45 kilometres (28 mi)	4	Planned
CT.46	Phan Thiet–Bao Loc–Gia Nghia–Bu Prang Expressway	194 kilometres (121 mi)	4	Planned

==== Southern regional expressway ====
Number	Name	Length	Lanes	Notes
CT.27	Dau Giay–Dalat Expressway	220 kilometres (140 mi)	4	Completed between Lien Khuong and Pass Prenn (Da Lat); was CT.14 before 2021
CT.28	Bien Hoa–Vung Tau Expressway	54 kilometres (34 mi)	6–8	Under construction; was CT.13 before 2021
CT.29	Ho Chi Minh City–Long Thanh–Dau Giay Expressway	55 kilometres (34 mi)	6–10	Fully opened; part of CT.01 before 2021
CT.30	Ho Chi Minh–Chon Thanh–Hoa Lu Expressway	130 kilometres (81 mi)	6	HCMC - Chon thanh: Under construction; was CT.15 before 2021
CT.31	Ho Chi Minh City–Moc Bai Expressway	53.5 kilometres (33.2 mi)	6	Will connect to Cambodia's E1 Phnom Penh–Bavet Expressway, parallels QL 22, Under construction; was CT.16 before 2021
CT.32	Go Dau–Xa Mat Expressway	65 kilometres (40 mi)	4	Proposed
CT.33	Ho Chi Minh City–Tien Giang–Ben Tre–Tra Vinh–Soc Trang Expressway	150 kilometres (93 mi)	4	Proposed
CT.34	Chau Doc–Can Tho–Soc Trang Expressway	191 kilometres (119 mi)	6	Under construction; was CT.17 before 2021
CT.35	Ha Tien–Rach Gia–Bac Lieu Expressway	212 kilometres (132 mi)	4	Proposed; was CT.18 before 2021
CT.36	Hong Ngu–Tra Vinh Expressway	188 kilometres (117 mi)	4	Cao Lanh - An Huu: Under construction

==== Hanoi ring road ====
Number	Name	Length	Lanes	Notes
CT.37	Hanoi Ring Road 3	55 kilometres (34 mi)	6	Fully completed; was CT.20 before 2021
CT.38	Hanoi Ring Road 4	102 kilometres (63 mi)	6	Under construction; was CT.21 before 2021
CT.39	Hanoi Ring Road 5	272 kilometres (169 mi)	6	Proposed

==== Ho chi minh city ring road ====
Number	Name	Length	Lanes	Notes
CT.40	Ho Chi Minh City Ring Road 3	92 kilometres (57 mi)	8	Completed Tan Van - Binh Chuan section and Provinde Road 25B - Long Truong section; was CT.22 before 2021
CT.41	Ho Chi Minh City Ring Road 4	199 kilometres (124 mi)	8	Funding phase

=== Expressways network planning in 2015 ===
Number	Name	Length	Notes
CT.01	North–South Expressway East	1,811 kilometres (1,125 mi)	Completed many expressway sections
CT.02	North–South Expressway West	1,269 kilometres (789 mi)	Some sections under construction
CT.03	Hanoi–Cao Bang Expressway	143 kilometres (89 mi)	Completed Hanoi-Chi Lang (Lang Son) section Hanoi–Chi Lang now part of the CT.01 and Tien Yen–Lang Son–Cao Bang split off to CT.10
CT.04	Hanoi–Haiphong Expressway	106 kilometres (66 mi)	Fully opened
CT.05	Hanoi–Lao Cai Expressway	264 kilometres (164 mi)	Yen Bai-Lao Cai: expanding
CT.06	Noi Bai–Ha Long–Mong Cai Expressway	304 kilometres (189 mi)	Hanoi-Bac Ninh and Ha Long-Mong Cai sections completed Now part of CT.09
CT.07	Hanoi–Thai Nguyen Expressway	70 kilometres (43 mi)	Hanoi–Thai Nguyen–Cho Moi section complete; Cho Moi–Bac Kan section under construction
CT.07	Thai Nguyen–Bac Kan–Cao Bang Expressway	43 kilometres (27 mi)	Hanoi–Thai Nguyen–Cho Moi section complete; Cho Moi–Bac Kan section under construction
CT.08	Hanoi–Hoa Binh Expressway	56 kilometres (35 mi)	Lang–Hoa Lac complete Hoa Lac–Hoa Binh: phase 1 completed In 2022, lengthened to Dien Bien and renumbered to CT.03
CT.09	Ninh Binh–Haiphong–Quang Ninh Expressway	160 kilometres (99 mi)	Haiphong–Ha Long section completed In 2022, shortened to Haiphong and renumbered to CT.08; Haiphong–Quang Ninh section split off to CT.06
CT.10	Hong Linh–Huong Son Expressway	34 kilometres (21 mi)	Project cancelled in 2022
CT.11	Cam Lo–Lao Bao Expressway	70 kilometres (43 mi)	Renumbered to CT.19 in 2022
CT.12	Quy Nhon–Pleiku Expressway	160 kilometres (99 mi)	Now part of the CT.20, Lengthened to Le Thanh border gate
CT.13	Bien Hoa–Vung Tau Expressway	76 kilometres (47 mi)	Under construction Renumbered to CT.28 in 2022
CT.14	Dau Giay–Dalat Expressway	220 kilometres (140 mi)	Lien Khuong–Pass Prenn (Dalat) complete Dau Giay–Lien Khuong: under construction Renumbered to CT.27 in 2022
CT.15	Ho Chi Minh City–Thu Dau Mot–Chon Thanh Expressway	69 kilometres (43 mi)	Renumbered to CT.30 in 2022, lengthened to Hoa Lu border gate
CT.16	Ho Chi Minh City–Moc Bai Expressway	55 kilometres (34 mi)	Renumbered to CT.31 in 2022, under construction
CT.17	Chau Doc–Can Tho–Soc Trang Expressway	200 kilometres (120 mi)	Under construction Renumbered to CT.34 in 2022
CT.18	Ha Tien–Rach Gia–Bac Lieu Expressway	225 kilometres (140 mi)	Renumbered to CT.35
CT.19	Can Tho–Ca Mau Expressway	150 kilometres (93 mi)	Fully opened Merged into the CT.01 in 2022
CT.20	Hanoi Ring Road 3	55 kilometres (34 mi)	Renumbered to CT.37 in 2022
CT.21	Hanoi Ring Road 4	125 kilometres (78 mi)	Under construction Renumbered to CT.38 in 2022
CT.22	Ho Chi Minh City Ring Road 3	89 kilometres (55 mi)	Under construction Renumbered to CT.40 in 2022

== See also ==
- Transport in Vietnam
