= G7211 Nanning–Youyiguan Expressway =

Expressway in Guangxi, China

Nanning–Youyiguan Expressway
- 南宁－友谊关高速公路
- Nanyou Expressway 南友高速公路
- Route in Guangxi

Route information
- Auxiliary route of G72
- Part of AH1
- Length: 225.06 km (139.85 mi)
- Existed: 28 December 2005–present

Major junctions
- Northeast end: G72 / G7201 / G75 / G80 in Qingxiu District, Nanning, Guangxi
- G75 in Liangqing District, Nanning, Guangxi; G7201 in Jiangnan District, Nanning, Guangxi; Airport Road at Nanning Wuxu International Airport in Jiangnan District, Nanning, Guangxi; Guangxi S60 in Jiangzhou District, Chongzuo, Guangxi
- Southwest end: at Vietnam border in Pingxiang, Chongzuo, Guangxi

Location
- Country: China

Highway system
- National Trunk Highway System; Primary; Auxiliary; National Highways; Transport in China
← G7201	→ G7212

Nanning–Youyiguan Expressway

Chinese name
- Simplified Chinese: 南宁–友谊关高速公路
- Traditional Chinese: 南寧–友誼關高速公路
- Hanyu Pinyin: Nánníng–Yǒuyìguān Gāosù Gōnglù
- Literal meaning: Nanning–Friendship Pass Expressway
Transcriptions
Standard Mandarin
- Hanyu Pinyin: Nánníng–Yǒuyìguān Gāosù Gōnglù
- Bopomofo: ㄋㄢˊ ㄋㄧㄥˊ – ㄧㄡˇ ㄧˋ ㄍㄨㄢ ㄍㄠ ㄙㄨˋ ㄍㄨㄥ ㄌㄨˋ
- Gwoyeu Romatzyh: Nanning–Yeouyihguan Gausuh Gongluh
- Wade–Giles: Nan^{2}ning^{2}–Yu^{3}i^{4}kuan^{1} Kao^{1}su^{4} Kung^{1}lu^{4}
- Yale Romanization: Nánníng–Yǒuyìgwān Gāusù Gūnglù
Yue: Cantonese
- Jyutping: Naam^{4}cyu^{5}–Jau^{5}ji^{4}gwaan^{1} Gou^{1}cuk^{1} Gung^{1}lou^{6}

Nanyou Expressway
- Chinese: 南友高速公路
- Hanyu Pinyin: Nányǒu Gāosù Gōnglù
Transcriptions
Standard Mandarin
- Hanyu Pinyin: Nányǒu Gāosù Gōnglù
- Bopomofo: ㄋㄢˊ ㄧㄡˇ ㄍㄠ ㄙㄨˋ ㄍㄨㄥ ㄌㄨˋ
- Gwoyeu Romatzyh: Nanyeou Gausuh Gongluh
- Wade–Giles: Nan^{2}yu^{2} Kao^{1}su^{4} Kung^{1}lu^{4}
- Yale Romanization: Nányǒu Gāusù Gūnglù
Yue: Cantonese
- Jyutping: Naam^{4}jau^{5} Gou^{1}cuk^{1} Gung^{1}lou^{6}

Vietnamese name
- Vietnamese: Đường cao tốc Nam Ninh – Hữu Nghị Quan

Zhuang name
- Zhuang: Namzningz–Youjngeihgvanh gauhsu goengloh

The G7211 Nanning–Youyiguan Expressway (Chinese: 南宁—友谊关高速公路), commonly referred to as the Nanyou Expressway (Chinese: 南友高速公路), is a 225.06-kilometre-long expressway (139.85 mi) in the Chinese autonomous region of Guangxi that connects the city of Nanning, the capital of Guangxi, and Friendship Pass, known in Chinese as Youyiguan, a border crossing between China and Vietnam. The Friendship Pass is located in the county-level city of Pingxiang, under the administration of the city of Chongzuo. At the border, the expressway connects with the North–South Expressway East in Vietnam. The expressway is designated G7211, and opened on 28 December 2005.

The expressway is a spur of G72 Quanzhou–Nanning Expressway. The Nanning–Youyiguan Expressway branches off from its primary expressway, G72, just before the western terminus of G72 in Nanning. The entire route is also part of Asian Highway 1.

Along with the G7511 Qinzhou–Dongxing Expressway and G8011 Kaiyuan–Hekou Expressway, it is one of the three expressways that connect China with Vietnam.

== Route ==
=== Nanning City Center ===
The Nanning–Youyiguan Expressway begins east of the city centre of Nanning, at the San'an Interchange in Qingxiu District. At this interchange, it connects to the G72 Quanzhou–Nanning Expressway, its parent expressway, as well as the G7201 Nanning Ring Expressway, the G75 Lanzhou–Haikou Expressway, and the G80 Guangzhou–Kunming Expressway. It proceeds south, in a concurrency with the G7201 Nanning Ring Expressway and G75 Lanzhou–Haikou Expressway, to the Liangqing South interchange in Liangqing District, passing through Yongning District on the way. At this three way interchange, the Nanning–Youyiguan Expressway and Nanning Ring Expressway continue westward while the G75 Lanzhou–Haikou Expressway branches off to the south.

The concurrency with the G7201 Nanning Ring Expressway continues until the Gaoling Interchange in Jiangnan District, south of the city centre of Nanning, where the Nanning–Youyiguan Expressway proceeds southward, away from the city centre, while the G7201 Nanning Ring Expressway continues westward.

This section of expressway forms the southeastern part of a ring expressway around the city centre of Nanning. The orbital expressway is designated G7201 Nanning Ring Expressway. Hence, the G7201 Nanning Ring Expressway is concurrent with the Nanning–Youyiguan Expressway for this entire length, and in addition, the two expressways share exit numbers during the concurrency.

=== Nanning Airport Expressway ===
The 18.443-kilometre-long section of the Nanning–Youyiguan expressway (11.460 mi) south of the Gaoling interchange is known as the Nanning Airport Expressway. This section first opened in October 2000, and is so named because it connects the city centre with Nanning's international airport, Nanning Wuxu International Airport. As this section was built prior to the other sections, it uses different exit numbers than those employed on the rest of the expressway (in which kilometre zero is at the San'an interchange). Instead, the exit numbers reset, with the Gaoling interchange serving as kilometre zero for this section.

This section of expressway is toll-free. Just south of the Gaoling interchange, all motorists must stop at a toll booth. Immediately after the toll booth, the Nahong exit provides access to and from the city centre of Nanning from the south.

The Nanning Airport Expressway section of the Nanning–Youyiguan expressway traverses through Jiangnan District in a southwesterly manner, ending at the Wuxu exit, where it connects to Airport Road and Nanning Wuxu International Airport.

=== Wuxu to Youyiguan ===
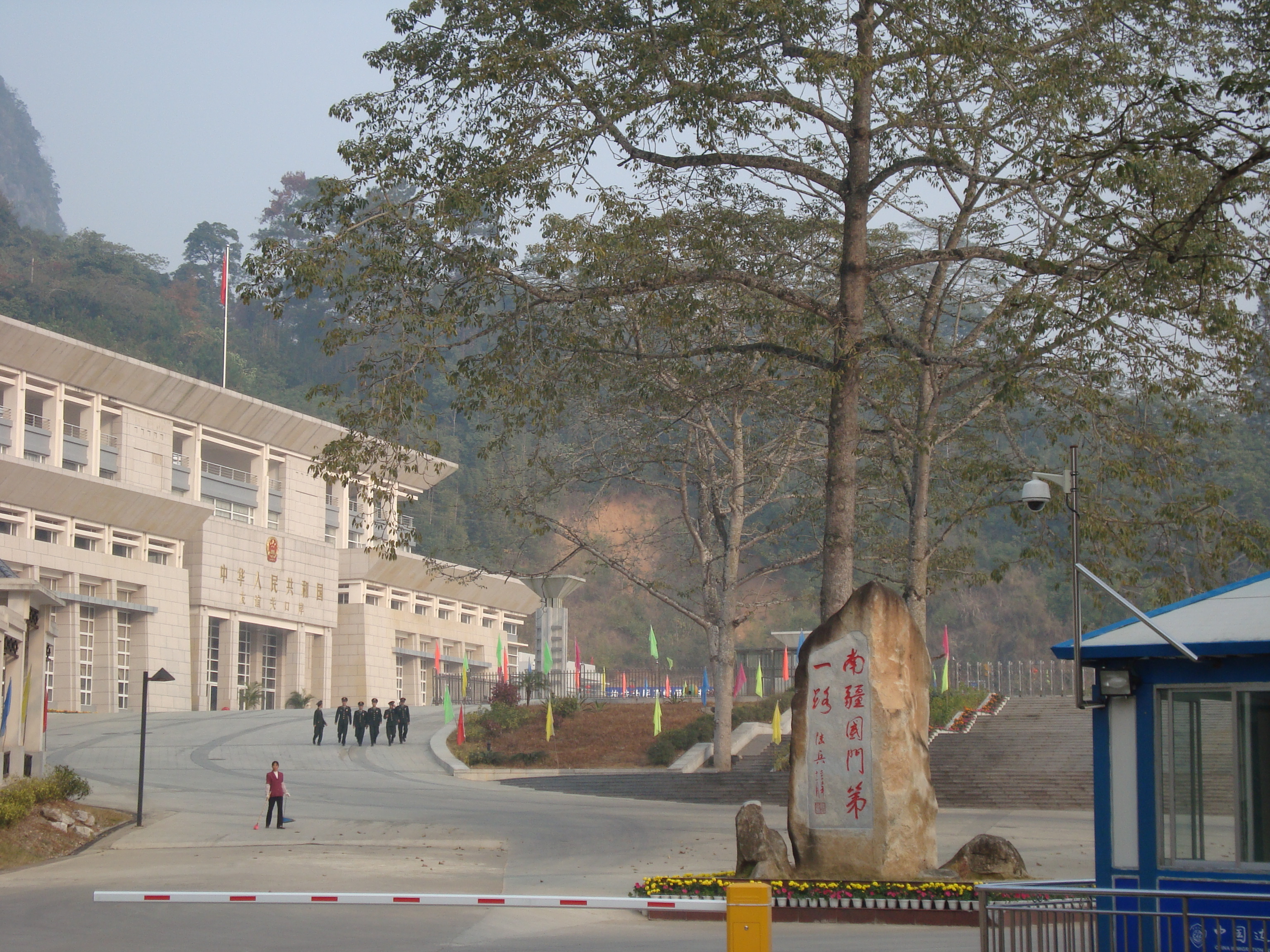
The border checkpoint of Youyiguan on the China–Vietnam border marks the southwestern terminus of the Nanning–Youyiguan Expressway.

The final section of expressway, from the Wuxu exit to the Vietnam border, is 180.063 kilometres (111.886 mi) in length. This section of expressway is tolled from the Wuxu exit to the Pingxiang exit. West of the Wuxu exit, motorists must stop at a toll booth.

The expressway enters the prefecture-level city of Chongzuo immediately after the Suxu exit. At the Yuanjing exit, the Nanning–Youyiguan Expressway connects with the S60 Qinzhou–Chongzuo Expressway to the east. This exit opened along with the opening of the Qinzhou–Chongzhou expressway on 31 December 2012.

The expressway passes just south of the city centre of Chongzuo, before continuing west to the county-level city of Pingxiang. The section of expressway between the Wuxu and Chongzuo exits has a speed limit of 100 km/h (62 mph). The speed limit between the Chongzuo and Ningming exits, just before Pingxiang, is 80 km/h (50 mph), and between Ningming and Youyiguan is 60 km/h (37 mph). The section between Ningming County and Youyiguan parallels much of China National Highway 322 and the Hunan–Guangxi Railway.

Entering Pingxiang, motorists must stop at a toll booth, marking the end of the tolled stretch of expressway. Immediately after the toll-booth is an at-grade intersection with China National Highway 322 and Jinxiang Avenue, the only at-grade intersection on the expressway. The expressway makes a sharp turn southward toward the Vietnam border and its southwestern terminus at Youyiguan. At Youyiguan, individuals must pass through the border checkpoint before entering Vietnam. On the Vietnamese side of Youyiguan is the northern terminus of the North–South Expressway East.

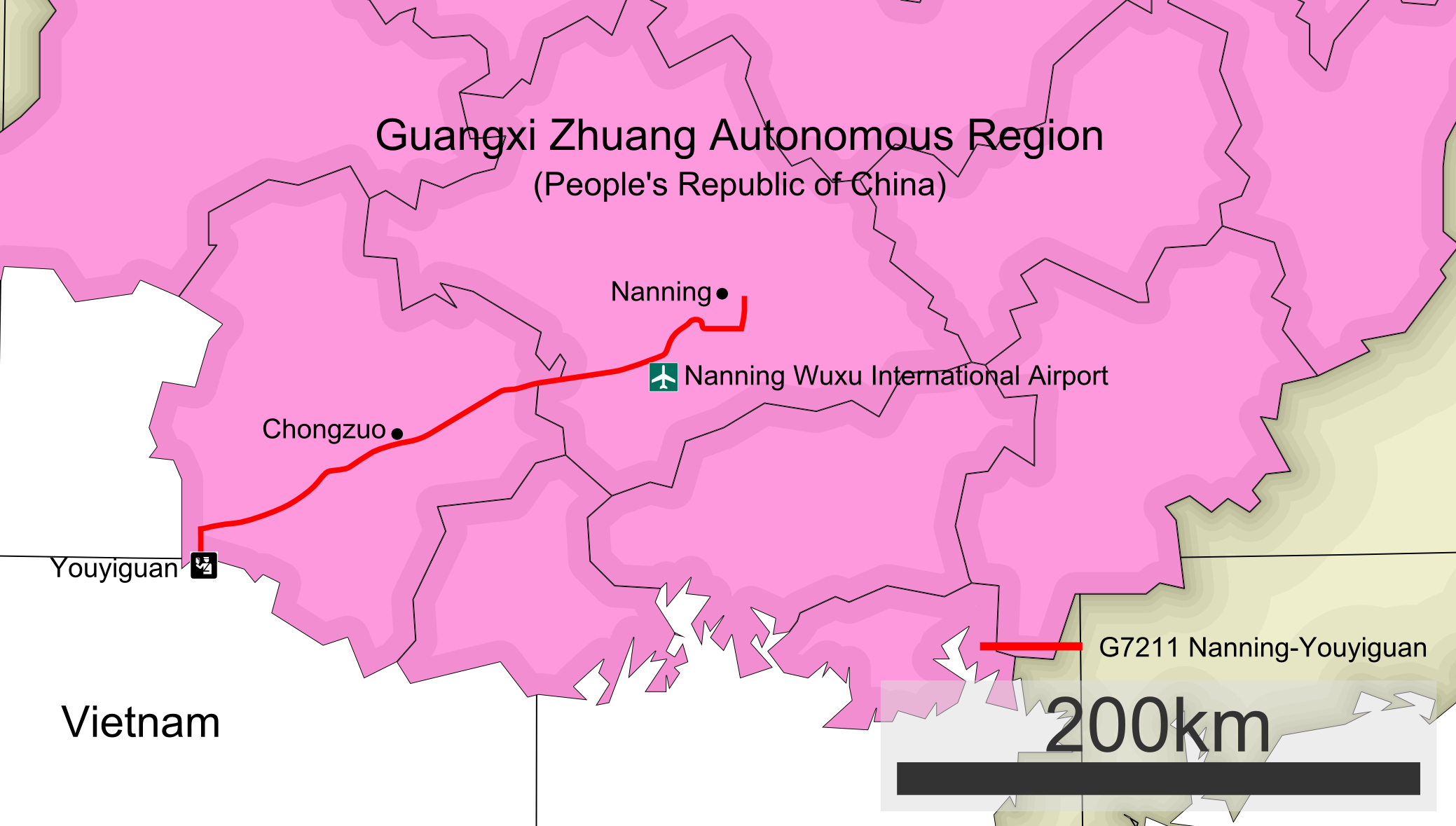
A detailed route map of the G7211 Nanning–Youyiguan Expressway.

== Exit List ==
Location	km	mi	Exit	Name	Destinations	Notes
Qingxiu District, Nanning	0	0	0	San'an	G72 / G7201 / G75 / G80 – Nanning East, Liuzhou, Wuzhou, Zhaoqing	Northern terminus of G7201, G75 concurrency
Yongning District, Nanning			6	Pumiao	Guangxi S101 (Wuxiang Avenue) – Pumiao, Liangqing	
Liangqing District, Nanning			11	Liangqing South	G75 – Qinzhou, Beihai, Fangchenggang	Southern terminus of G75 concurrency
Liangqing District, Nanning			19	Yudong	G325 (Yinhai Avenue) – Yudong, Nama	
Jiangnan District, Nanning	Gaoling Service Area					
Jiangnan District, Nanning			30	Gaoling	G7201 – Baise	Southern terminus of G7201 concurrency
Jiangnan District, Nanning	Gaoling Toll Booth					
Jiangnan District, Nanning			1	Nahong	Zhuangjin Avenue; Nahong Avenue; Wuxiang Avenue	Exit numbers restart numbering at zero for toll-free section of expressway between Nahong and Wuxu. This section is also known as the Nanning Airport Expressway.
Jiangnan District, Nanning			14	Mingyang Industrial Zone	G322 / X001 / X015	
Jiangnan District, Nanning				Wuxu	Airport Road – Nanning Wuxu International Airport	Unnumbered exit; resumes previous numbering past Wuxu
Jiangnan District, Nanning	Wuxu Toll Booth					
Jiangnan District, Nanning			57	Suxu	G322 / X019 – Suxu, Shangsi	
Fusui County, Chongzuo	Fusui Service Area					
Fusui County, Chongzuo			73	Fusui	X019 / X522 – Fusui, Bapen	
Fusui County, Chongzuo			87	Quli	X521 – Quli, Leizhou	
Fusui County, Chongzuo			113	Qujiu	X525 – Qujiu, Dongluo, Laituan	
Jiangzhou District, Chongzuo	Chongzuo Service Area					
Jiangzhou District, Chongzuo				Yuanjing	Guangxi S60 – Qinzhou, Shangsi	
Jiangzhou District, Chongzuo			137	Chongzuo	Guangxi S213 (Youyi Avenue/East Huancheng Road) – Chongzuo, Jiangzhou	
Ningming County, Chongzuo			157	Tianxi	X528 – Tianxi, Tingliang	
Ningming County, Chongzuo	Ningming Service Area					
Ningming County, Chongzuo			181	Ningming	G322 / X549 – Ningming, Huashan	
Pingxiang, Chongzuo			195	Xiashi	G322 – Longzhou, Xiashi	
Pingxiang, Chongzuo	Pingxiang Toll Booth					
Pingxiang, Chongzuo			210	Pingxiang	G322 – Pingxiang North; Jinxiang Avenue – Pingxiang	At-grade intersection
Pingxiang, Chongzuo	Pingxiang Service Area					
Pingxiang, Chongzuo			214	Youyi	Guangxi S325 – Pingxiang South, Logistics Zone	
Pingxiang, Chongzuo			221	Puzhai	Guangxi S325 – Pingxiang South, Aikou	
Pingxiang, Chongzuo				Youyiguan (Friendship Pass)	CT.01	China–Vietnam border crossing
Closed/former; Concurrency terminus; HOV only; Incomplete access; Tolled; Route transition; Unopened
