= Hanoi–Haiphong Expressway =

Road in Vietnam

CT.04 Expressway
- Hanoi - Haiphong Expressway
- Đường cao tốc Hà Nội - Hải Phòng

Route information
- Part of AH14
- Maintained by Vietnam Expressway Corp (VEC)
- Length: 105.5 km (65.6 mi)
- Existed: 5 December 2015–present

Major junctions
- West end: CT.37 / CT.01 / QL 1 at Cổ Linh IC, Long Biên, Hanoi
- in Quảng Uyên, Yên Mỹ, Hưng Yên in Ân Thi, Hưng Yên in Gia Lộc, Hải Dương in An Lão, Hải Phòng in Tràng Cát, Hải An, Hải Phòng in Bạch Đằng Bridge, Hải An, Hải Phòng
- East end: Đình Vũ Port

Location
- Country: Vietnam
- Provinces: Hanoi, Hưng Yên. Hải Dương, Haiphong

Highway system
- Transport in Vietnam
← CT.03	→ CT.05

Hanoi–Haiphong Expressway (Vietnamese: Đường cao tốc Hà Nội - Hải Phòng, labelled CT.04) is one of Vietnam's controlled-access highways, running for 105.5 kilometres (65.6 mi) connecting Hanoi to Haiphong. It runs nearly parallel to National Route 5 and Hanoi–Haiphong railway. The expressway is a major freight corridor for Vietnam's Northern Pivotal Economic Region as well as the Kunming-Hanoi-Haiphong Economic Corridor. It is abbreviated as CT.04.

The six-lane expressway was developed under build-operation-transfer contracts. The construction of the expressway was started on 2 February 2009 and finished on 5 December 2015. This road allows people to drive up to 120km/h.

The West end of the expressway is at the north of Thanh Trì Bridge in Hanoi and the East end at Đình Vũ Dike in Haiphong.

== Route details ==
=== Lanes ===
- 6 lanes + 2 shoulder

=== Distance ===
- 105,5 km

=== Speed limit ===
- Max: 120 km/h, Min: 60 km/h
  - 2 fast lanes: Max: 120 km/h, Min: 80 km/h
  - Slow lane: Max: 100 km/h, Min: 60 km/h

=== Bridge on route ===
- 9 large overpasses, 21 medium overpasses, 22 overpasses and underpasses on residential roads.

== List of interchanges and features ==
Speed Information

- IC - interchange, JCT - junction, SA - service area, PA - parking area, BS - bus stop, TN - tunnel, TB - toll gate, BR - bridge

No.	Name	Dist. from Origin	Connections	Notes	Location	
Connects to Co Linh Street
1	IC Cổ Linh	0.0	( AH1 National Route 1); Ring Road 3	Start of the route	Hà Nội	Long Biên
2	JCT Vin City	4.0	Nguyễn Quý Trị street Vinhomes Ocean Park	Exit: Hanoi; Join: Haiphong	Hà Nội	Gia Lâm
BR	B-01	↓		Cross the Bac Hung Hai canal	Hà Nội – Hưng Yên boundary	
3	JCT Văn Giang	11.0	Tô Quyền street Vinhomes Ocean Park 2 and 3		Hưng Yên	Văn Giang
TG	Toll Gate (Hanoi)	12.7			Hưng Yên	Văn Giang
4	IC Ring road 4		Hanoi Ring Road 4	Under Construction	Hưng Yên	Văn Giang
5	IC Yên Mỹ	21.0	Chợ Bến – Yên Mỹ; National Route 39		Hưng Yên	Yên Mỹ
SA	V23 Hưng Yên Service Area	24.3			Hưng Yên	Yên Mỹ
6	IC Ân Thi		National Route 38	Under Construction	Hưng Yên	Ân Thi
BR	Bãi Sậy Bridge	↓			Hưng Yên – Hải Dương boundary	
7	IC Bình Giang		Provincial Road 392	Under Construction	Hải Dương	Bình Giang
BR	Cầu Ô Xuyên	↓		Cross the Bac Hung Hai canal	Hải Dương	Gia Lộc
8	IC Gia Lộc	49.0	National Route 38		Hải Dương	Gia Lộc
SA	V52 Hải Dương Service Area	53.0			Hải Dương	Gia Lộc
9	IC Thanh Hà		Provincial Road 390	Under Construction	Hải Dương	Thanh Hà
BR	Thái Bình Bridge	↓		Thái Bình river pass	Hải Dương – Hải Phòng boundary	
10	IC An Lão	74.0	National Route 10		Hải Phòng	An Lão
SA	V77 Hải Phòng Service Area	76.6			Hải Phòng	An Lão
11	IC CT.08		Ninh Bình – Hải Phòng	Planned	Hải Phòng	Dương Kinh
TG	Toll Gate (Haiphong)	94.6			Hải Phòng	Dương Kinh
12	IC Dương Kinh	95.0	Provincial Road 353		Hải Phòng	Dương Kinh
BR	Lạch Tray Bridge	↓		Lạch Tray river pass	Hải Phòng	Dương Kinh – Hải An boundary
13	IC Tràng Cát	98.7	Đình Vũ – Cát Hải Bridge; Tân Vũ - Lạch Huyện street		Hải Phòng	Hải An
14	IC Bạch Đằng Bridge	104	Hải Phòng – Hạ Long – Vân Đồn – Móng Cái		Hải Phòng	Hải An
15	IC Đình Vũ	105	Provincial Road 356	End of the route	Hải Phòng	Hải An
1.000 mi = 1.609 km; 1.000 km = 0.621 mi: Proposed; Incomplete access; Route transition; Unopened
