= G7221 Hengyang–Nanning Expressway =

Road in China

Hengyang–Nanning Expressway
- 衡阳－南宁高速公路
- Hengnan Expressway 衡南高速公路

Route information
- Auxiliary route of G72

Major junctions
- North end: G0421 in Zhengxiang District, Hengyang, Hunan
- South end: G7201 / G80 in Xingning District, Nanning, Guangxi

Location
- Country: China

Highway system
- National Trunk Highway System; Primary; Auxiliary; National Highways; Transport in China
← G7212	→ G75

The G7221 Hengyang–Nanning Expressway (Chinese: 衡阳—南宁高速公路), also referred to as the Hengnan Expressway (Chinese: 衡南高速公路), is an under construction expressway in China that connects Hengyang, Hunan to Nanning, Guangxi.

== Route ==
The expressway starts in Zhengxiang District, Hengyang, and passes through Chengbu Miao Autonomous County, Longsheng Various Nationalities Autonomous County, Rong'an County, Yizhou District and Shanglin County before terminating in Xingning District, Nanning.
