= Ninh Binh–Haiphong Expressway =

Road in Vietnam

CT.08 Expressway
- Ninh Binh–Haiphong Expressway
- Đường cao tốc Ninh Bình – Hải Phòng
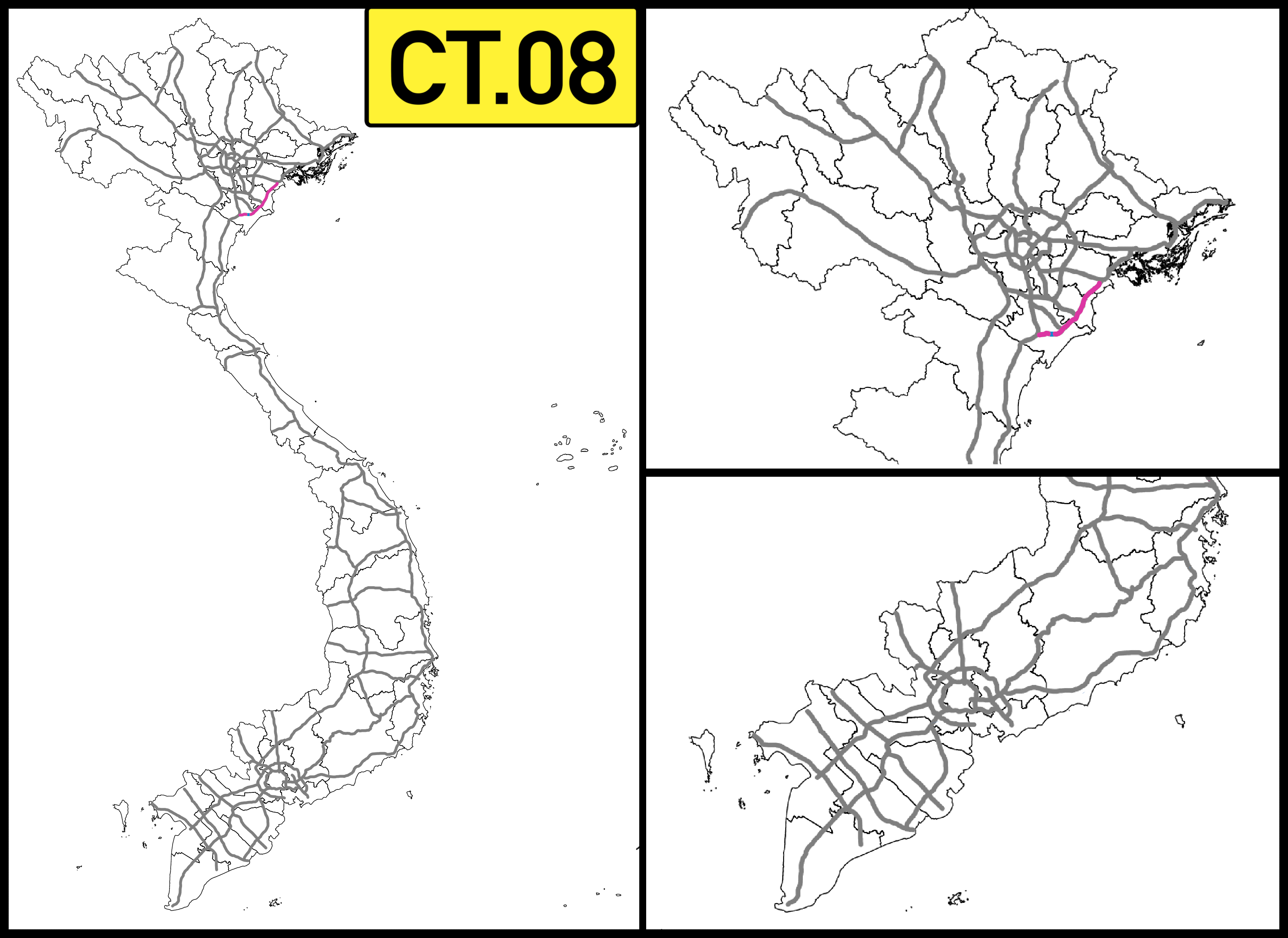

Route information
- Length: 109 km (68 mi)
- Status: Under construction

Major junctions
- South end: in Yên Mô, Ninh Binh
- North end: / in Hải An, Haiphong

Location
- Country: Vietnam

Highway system
- Transport in Vietnam
← CT.07	→ CT.09

Ninh Binh–Haiphong Expressway (Vietnamese: Đường cao tốc Ninh Bình–Hải Phòng, labelled CT.08) is a partially completed expressway in Vietnam, running for 109 km connecting Ninh Binh to Haiphong. The route connects the northern coastal provinces of Vietnam with the North–south expressway.

From 2015 to 2021, the expressway was planned as a large part of the former Ninh Binh - Hai Phong - Quang Ninh Expressway as the CT.09 before the Haiphong–Quang Ninh section was split off to the CT.06.

== Sections ==
=== Ninh Binh–Hai Phong ===
This 50-kilometre-long (31 mi) section is estimated to cost VND 10,000 billion and is currently in the financing stage.
