= Bạch Đằng Bridge =

Bridge in Vietnam

Bạch Đằng Bridge Cầu Bạch Đằng
- Coordinates: 20.848037°N 106.765584°E
- Crosses: Bạch Đằng River
- Locale: Quảng Ninh Province, Vietnam

Characteristics
- Design: Cable-stayed bridge
- Total length: 3,054 metres (10,020 ft)
- Width: 25 metres (82 ft)
- Height: 135 metres (443 ft)
- Longest span: 240 metres (787 ft) (x2)
- Clearance above: 55 metres (180 ft)

History
- Construction start: January 25, 2015
- Opened: September 1, 2018

Location
- Interactive map of Bạch Đằng Bridge

Bach Dang Bridge (Vietnamese: Cầu Bạch Đằng), is a cable-stayed bridge that crosses the Bạch Đằng River between Haiphong City and Quảng Ninh Province. This is the largest cable-stayed bridge in Vietnam and ranked 3rd among the 7 largest cable-stayed bridges in the world

== Description ==
Bach Dang Bridge spans the Bach Dang River on the Ninh Binh–Hai Phong–Quang Ninh Expressway, connecting Haiphong City and Quang Ninh Province. The bridge is the end point for the Ninh Binh–Hai Phong–Quang Ninh Expressway, with its northern end in the Lien Vi commune, Quảng Yên of Quang Ninh Province and its southern end in the Dong Hai 2 ward of Hải An District, Haiphong. With four cable stays and at over 3 km, it is one of the longest bridges in Vietnam.

== Construction ==
In 2012, Quang Ninh Province approved a new draft by the Japanese group SE that proposed a steel cable-stayed design rather than original prestressed concrete bridge design that was being considered. On January 15, 2015, the groundbreaking ceremony took place for what was a then-estimated VND 7.6 trillion (more than US$357.2 million). As the creators of the initial design, the Japanese group SE would also oversee the bridge's construction under a build-operate-transfer model with the aim of four lanes of traffic By April 2018, the final beam was installed into the bridge, making it the first cable-stay bridge made by Vietnam and earning it the nickname "Made in Vietnam bridge". The bridge's three H-shaped towers are said to symbolize the three cities of Hanoi, Ha Long and Hai Phong, which it helps connect.

== Operation ==
With its opening, it is calculated to reduce the driving distance between Quang Ninh and Hanoi from 175 km to 125 km By November 2018, concerns grew over the unevenness of the road's surface, but authorities deemed it safe for motorists. After one year of traffic, Quang Ninh estimated that the bridge was averaging 11,000 vehicles a day. In 2020, a study was conducted on wind-induced vibrations on the cables of the bridge.
