= G7212 Liuzhou–Beihai Expressway =

Road in Guangxi, China

Liuzhou–Beihai Expressway
- 柳州－北海高速公路
- Liubei Expressway 柳北高速公路

Route information
- Auxiliary route of G72
- Length: 345 km (214 mi)

Major junctions
- North end: G72 / Guangxi S31 in Liujiang, Liuzhou, Guangxi
- South end: G228 in Yinhai, Beihai, Guangxi

Location
- Country: China

Highway system
- National Trunk Highway System; Primary; Auxiliary; National Highways; Transport in China
← G7211	→ G7221

The G7212 Liuzhou–Beihai Expressway (Chinese: 柳州—北海高速公路), commonly referred to as the Liubei Expressway (Chinese: 柳北高速公路), is an expressway in Guangxi, China that connects the cities of Liuzhou and Beihai.

== Route ==
The section from Wuxuan to Guiping is a six-lane expressway with a driving speed of 100 km/h. The remaining sections of the expressway are four-lane with a design speed of 120 km/h. The entire expressway was opened to traffic on 17 October 2017.
