= Hải An, Haiphong =

Hải An
- Ward
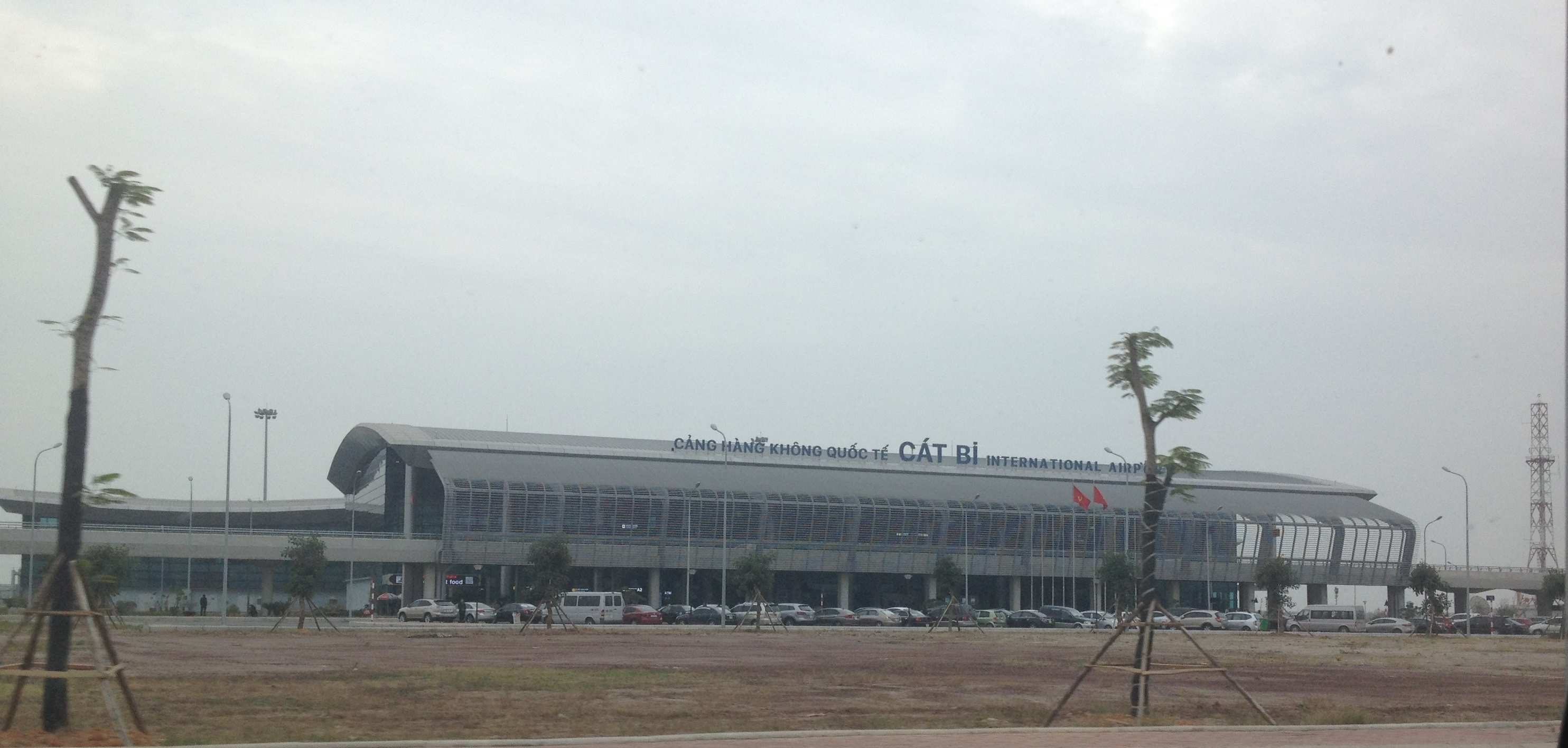
- Cat Bi International Airport
- Interactive map of Hải An
- Coordinates: 20.83164470564738°N 106.72032030762273°E
- Country: Vietnam
- Region: Red River Delta
- City: Hải Phòng
- Established: 16 June 2025
- Administrative headquarters: 18 Lực Hành Street

Area
  - Total: 39.99 km^{2} (15.44 sq mi)

Population (2025)
  - Total: 102,648
  - Density: 2,566/km^{2} (6,650/sq mi)
- Administrative code: 11413
- Website: haian.haiphong.gov.vn

Hải An is a ward in the city of Hải Phòng, Vietnam.

== History ==
The area of present-day Hải An Ward was formerly part of Hải An district, Hai Phong.

On 16 June 2025, the Standing Committee of the National Assembly of Vietnam issued Resolution No. 1669/NQ-UBTVQH15 on the arrangement of commune-level administrative units in Hai Phong in 2025. Under the resolution, the entire area and population of Cát Bi, Đằng Lâm, Thành Tô, Đằng Hải, and Tràng Cát wards, together with part of the area and population of Nam Hải Ward and part of the area of Đông Hải 2 Ward, were merged to form a new ward named Hải An.

On the same date, the Standing Committee of the National Assembly of Vietnam issued the resolution on the arrangement of commune-level administrative units in Hai Phong in 2025. Under the resolution, the entire area and population of Cát Bi, Đằng Lâm, Thành Tô, Đằng Hải, and Tràng Cát wards, together with part of the area and population of Nam Hải Ward and part of the area of Đông Hải 2 Ward, were merged to form a new ward named Hải An.
