= Haiphong–Ha Long–Van Don–Mong Cai Expressway =

Road in Vietnam

CT.06 Expressway
- Hai Phong–Ha Long–Van Don–Mong Cai Expressway
- Đường cao tốc Hải Phòng – Hạ Long – Vân Đồn – Móng Cái
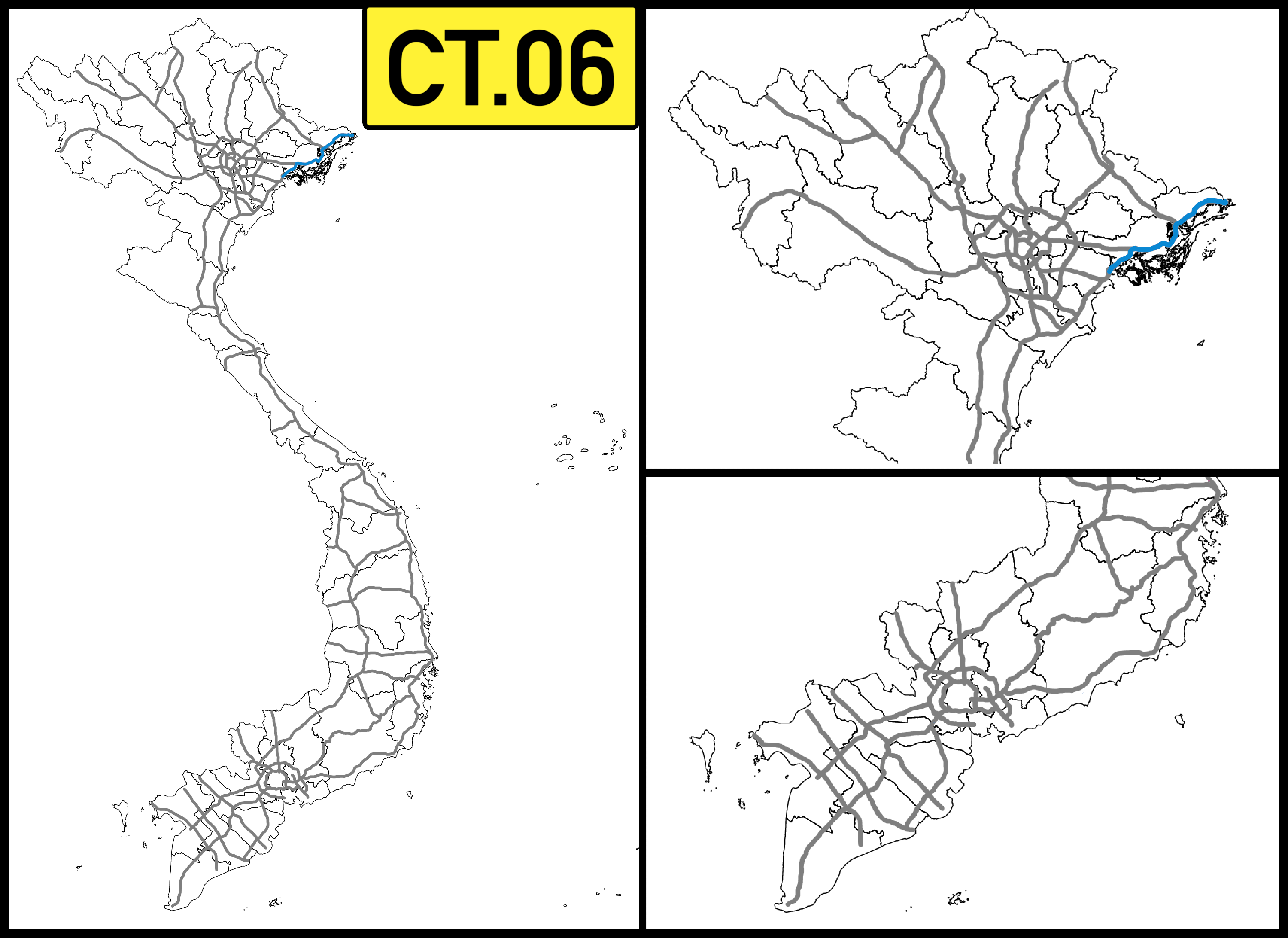

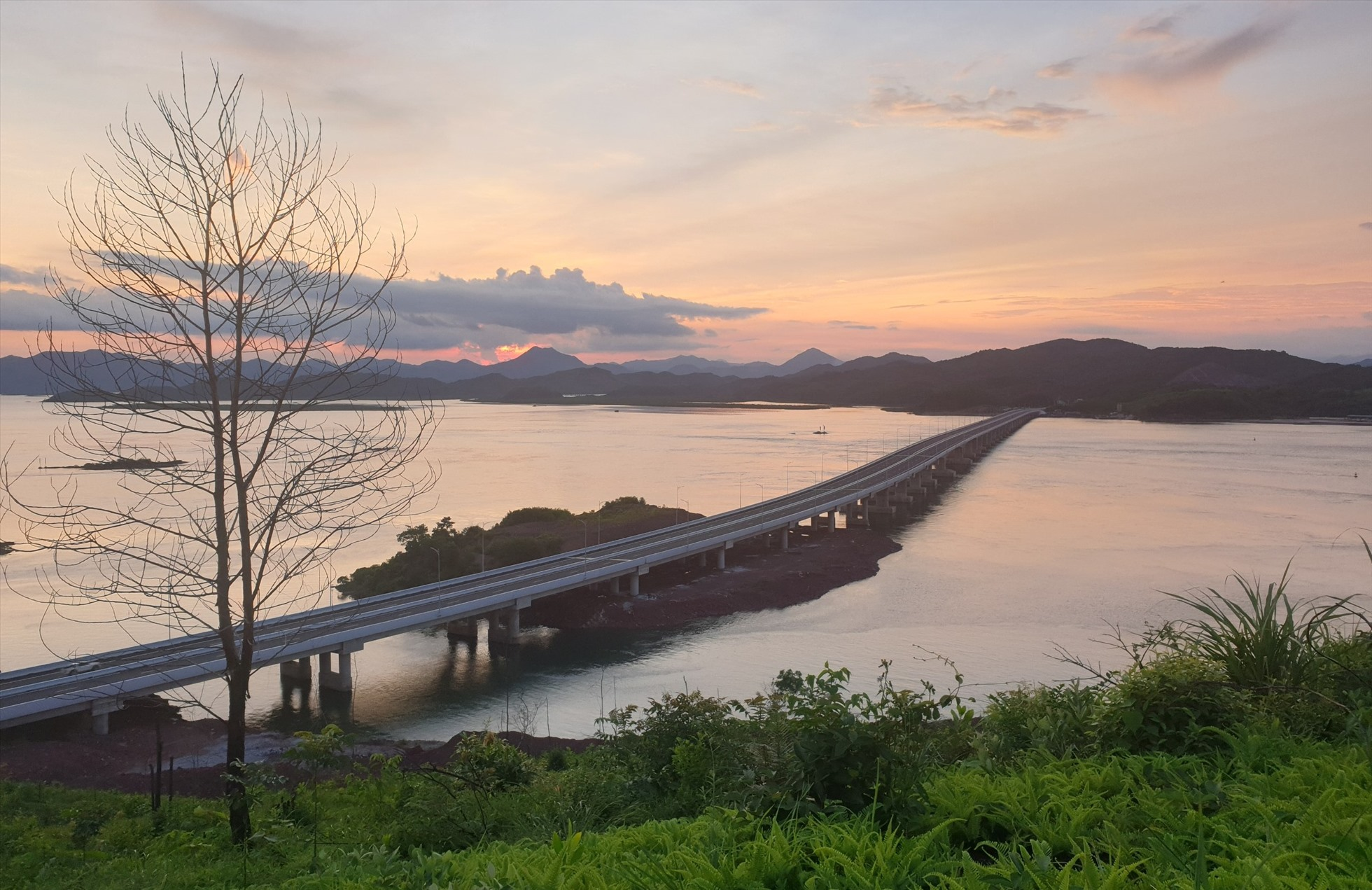
- Van Tien Bridge between Van Don and Tien Yen

Route information
- Maintained by SunGroup
- Length: 175 km (109 mi)
- Existed: 1 September 2018–present

Major junctions
- West end: Bach Dang Bridge, Hai An, Haiphong
- East end: at Bac Luan II Border Gate, Chinese border

Location
- Country: Vietnam
- Provinces: Haiphong, Quang Ninh

Highway system
- Transport in Vietnam
← CT.05	→ CT.07

The Haiphong–Ha Long–Van Don–Mong Cai Expressway (Vietnamese: Đường cao tốc Hải Phòng – Hạ Long – Vân Đồn – Móng Cái) is an expressway in Vietnam, connecting Hanoi with the east border town of Mong Cai, towards Dongxing in China. It connects to G7511 Qinzhou–Dongxing Expressway on the Chinese side of the border.

== Construction ==
=== Haiphong–Ha Long ===
This section starts at Haiphong, connecting to the Hanoi–Haiphong Expressway. It was built at a total investment cost of VND 25,000 billion. The total length is 25 kilometres (16 mi). The maximum speed is 100 kilometres per hour (62 mph). The government of Quảng Ninh province invested 6,400 billion VND in this section, making it one of the first examples of regional government investment in expressways.

=== Ha Long–Van Don ===
The investment cost for this 60-kilometre (37 mi), four-lane section was VND 12,000 billion. It opened in December 2018. The toll amount was set at VND 2,100/km. The expressway currently ends at Van Don International Airport.

=== Van Don–Mong Cai ===
This section runs from Van Don Airport to the border with China at Móng Cái, totaling 80 km, with an investment cost of VND 11,195 billion, financed through a 19-year build-operate-transfer contract with a Sun Group daughter company. Travel time between the two termini was shortened from 120 minutes to 50 minutes and the maximum speed was initially 100 km/h, and was later modified to 120 km/h. Construction started in 2020 and finished on 30 April 2022.
