= Dau Giay–Dalat Expressway =

Road in Vietnam

CT.27 Expressway
- Dau Giay–Dalat Expressway
- Đường cao tốc Dầu Giây - Đà Lạt
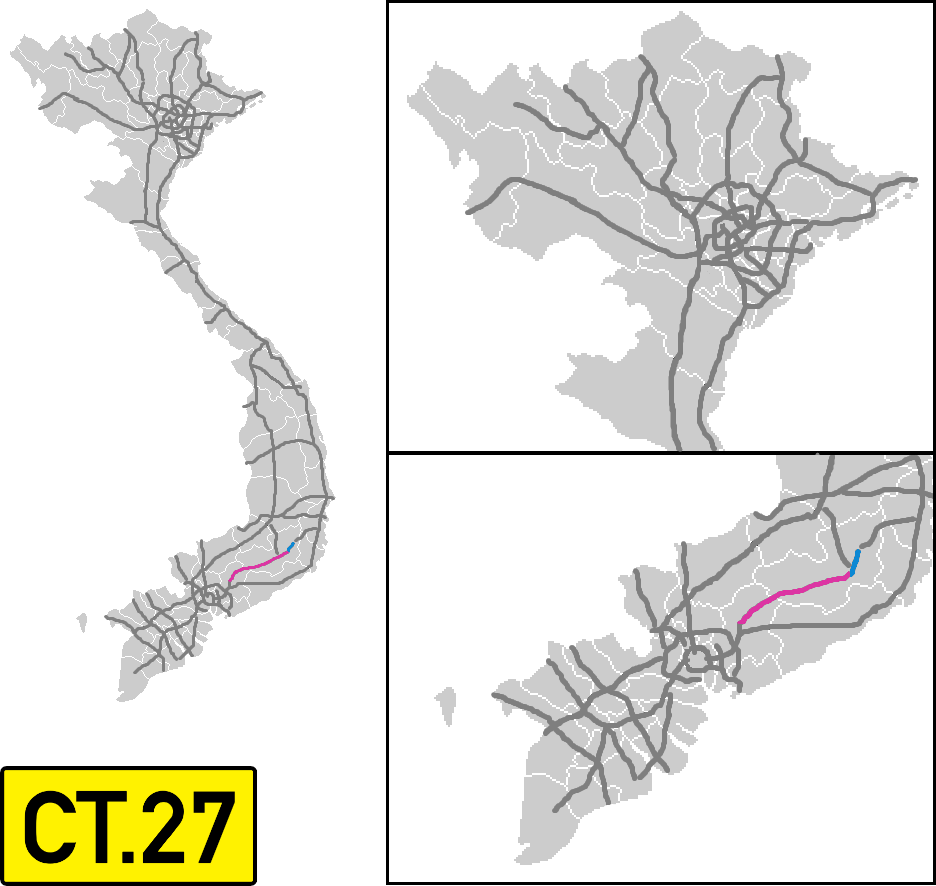

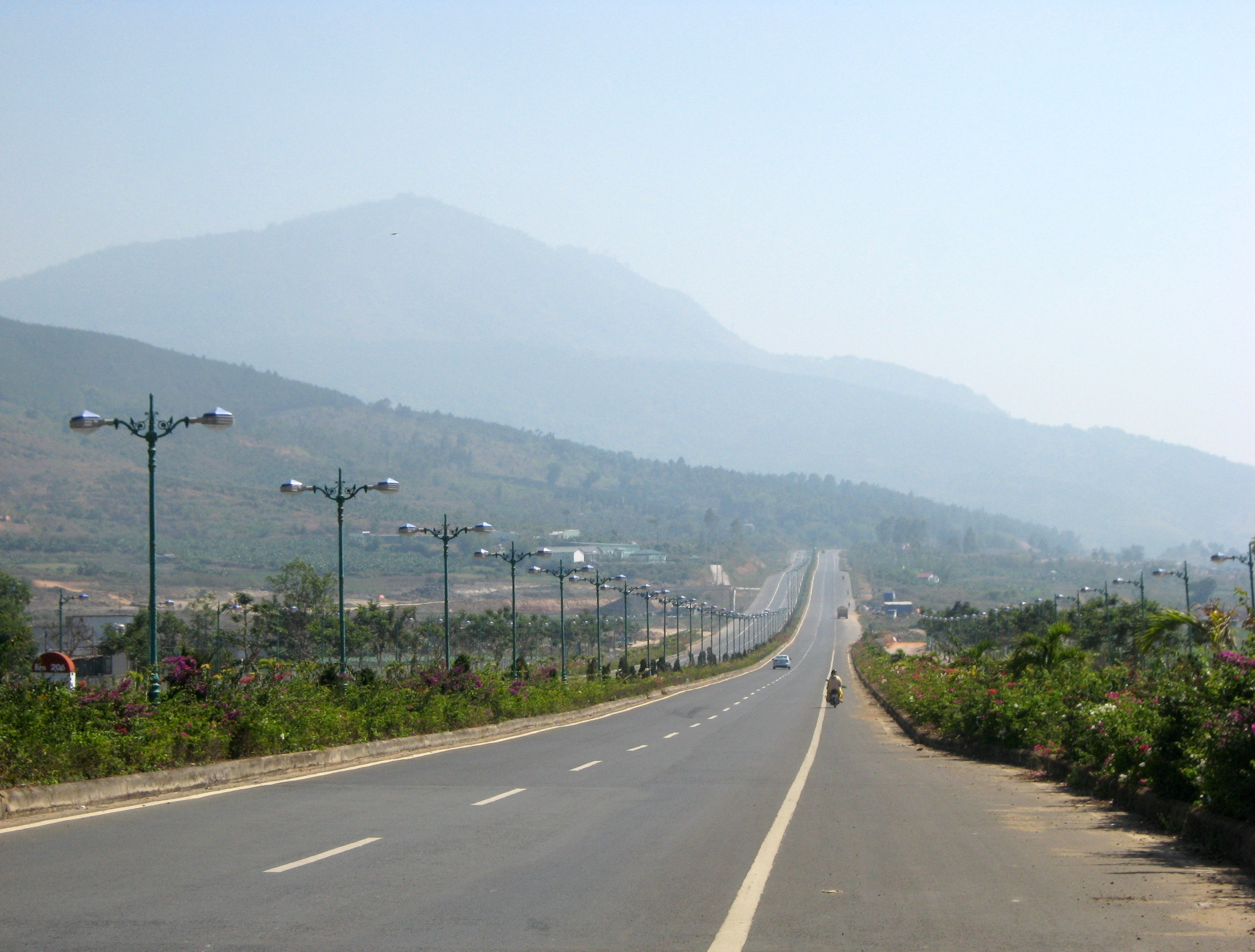
- Lien Khuong - Da Lat highway

Route information
- Length: 124 mi (200 km)
- Existed: 2008–present

Major junctions
- South end: at Dau Giay Interchange, Thống Nhất District, Dong Nai
- North end: at Da Lat, Lâm Đồng Province

Location
- Country: Vietnam

Highway system
- Transport in Vietnam

The Dau Giay-Dalat Expressway (Vietnamese: Đường cao tốc Dầu Giây–Đà Lạt) is a partially completed expressway in Vietnam. It will connect Dong Nai Province with Da Lat. It is a four-lane expressway with a maximum speed of 100 km/h, roughly paralleling National Road 20. The road is expected to be a strong stimulus for the development of Vietnam's Central Highlands region.

== Development ==
The route yet to be completed has been divided into three sections by the Ministry of Transport. The investment budget is sourced from a mixture of Build, Operate and Transfer contracts, Japanese development loans from JICA and direct state investment.

Dau Giay-Tan Phu

Construction of the 59.6 km long section between Dau Giay and Tan Phu is scheduled to begin in 2020 with a total investment of 7,000 billion VND.

Tan Phu-Bao Loc

The Tan Phu-Bao Loc section is planned at a development cost of 17,000 billion VND.

Bao Loc-Lien Khuong

This planned section has a total budget of 13,000 billion VND.

Lien Khuong-Da Lat

The 19.2 km long section between Lien Khuong Airport and Pass Prenn near Da Lat was completed in 2008.
