= Ân Thi =

- Commune
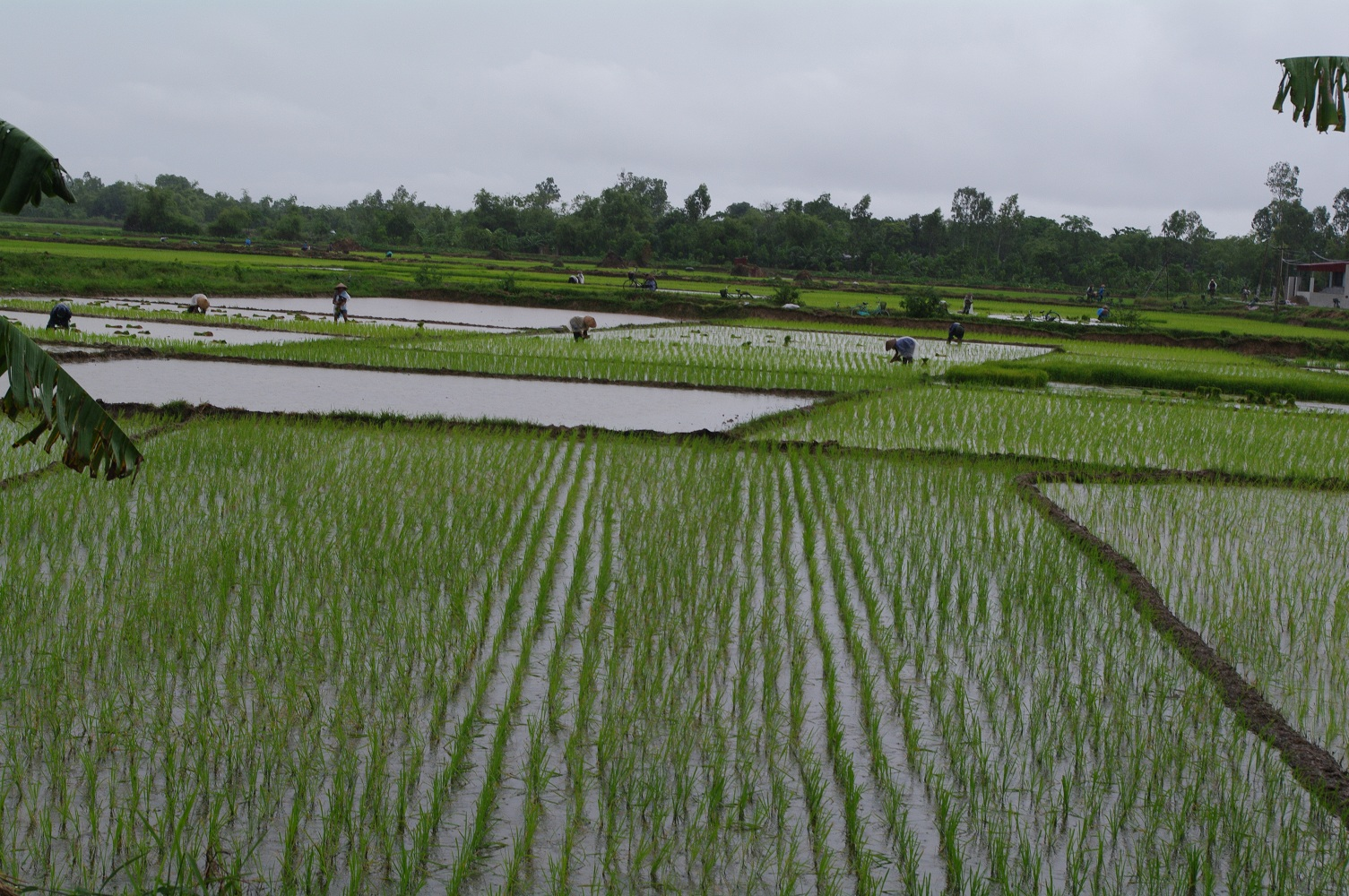
- A section of a rice field in the commune
- Interactive map of Ân Thi
- Coordinates: 20°49′17″N 106°5′50″E
- Country: Vietnam
- Region: Red River Delta
- Province: Hưng Yên
- Established: 16 June 2025

Area
  - Total: 24.39 km^{2} (9.42 sq mi)

Population (2025)
  - Total: 30,582
  - Density: 1,254/km^{2} (3,250/sq mi)

Ân Thi is a commune in Hưng Yên province, Vietnam. The commune inherited its name from the former Ân Thi district and Ân Thi township.

On 16 June 2025:

- The National Assembly of Vietnam adopted Resolution No. 203/2025/QH15 amending and supplementing several articles of the Constitution of Vietnam (effective from 16 June 2025). Under the resolution, district-level administrative units nationwide ceased to operate from 1 July 2025.
- The Standing Committee of the National Assembly of Vietnam issued Resolution No. 1666/NQ-UBTVQH15 on the arrangement of commune-level administrative units in Hưng Yên province in 2025 (effective from 16 June 2025). Under the resolution, the entire area and population of Ân Thi township, Quang Vinh commune, and Hoàng Hoa Thám commune were merged to form a new commune named Ân Thi.
