= China National Highway 322 =

Road in China

National Highway 322
- 322国道

Route information
- Length: 2,288 km (1,422 mi)

Major junctions
- From: Rui'an, Zhejiang
- To: CT.01 / QL 1 at Vietnamese border

Location
- Country: China

Highway system
- National Trunk Highway System; Primary; Auxiliary
← G321	→ G323

China National Highway 322 (G322) runs from Hunan to Guangxi. It is 1,039 kilometres in length and runs southwest from Hengyang towards Friendship Pass, which is on the China-Vietnam border. Its western end connects to National Route 1A in Vietnam.

== Route and distance ==
Route and distance

City	Distance (km)
Hengyang, Hunan	0
Qidong, Hunan	55
Qiyang, Hunan	107
Lingling, Hunan	159
Quanzhou, Guangxi	238
Xing'an, Guangxi	301
Lingchuan, Guangxi	350
Guilin, Guangxi	367
Lingui, Guangxi	378
Yongfu, Guangxi	414
Luzhai, Guangxi	486
Liuzhou, Guangxi	530
Liujiang, Guangxi	541
Binyang, Guangxi	704
Nanning, Guangxi	791
Ningming, Guangxi	979
Pingxiang, Guangxi	1022
Friendship Pass, Guangxi	1039

== See also ==
- China National Highways
- AH1
