= Can Tho–Ca Mau Expressway =

Road in Vietnam

CT.01 Expressway
- Đường cao tốc %paddedRoute%
- Can Tho–Ca Mau Expressway

Route information
- Length: 130 km (81 mi)

Major junctions
- North end: at Cần Thơ
- South end: at Cà Mau, Cà Mau province

Location
- Country: Vietnam

Highway system
- Transport in Vietnam

The Can Tho–Ca Mau Expressway (Vietnamese: Đường cao tốc Cần Thơ–Cà Mau) is a planned expressway in Vietnam. It will connect the Mekong Delta cities Cần Thơ and Cà Mau and is the southernmost portion of the North–South Expressway East.

From 2015 to 2021 the route was planned as CT.19; it was merged into the North–South Expressway East in 2022.

== Development ==
The route yet to be built has been divided into two sections, totaling 130 kilometres (81 mi) by the Ministry of Transport. The total development cost is estimated at VND47 trillion (US$2 billion). This was later reduced to VND42 trillion, as a detour passing Sóc Trăng was scrapped. Construction is planned to start by 2025 and to be completed before 2030. The Cần Thơ–Bạc Liêu section will be financed directly using public funds. The Bạc Liêu-Cà Mau section will be financed by public–private partnership.
