= G7201 Nanning Ring Expressway =

Road in Nanning, China

Nanning Ring Expressway
- 南宁绕城高速公路
- 南宁绕城高速

Route information
- Length: 82 km (51 mi)
- Existed: 2003–present

Location
- Country: China

Highway system
- National Trunk Highway System; Primary; Auxiliary; National Highways; Transport in China
| ← G72 | → G7211 |

The Nanning Ring Expressway (Chinese: 南宁绕城高速公路), designated as G7201, is a ring expressway in Nanning, Guangxi, China. The Nanning Ring Expressway is composed of 3 sections, with a total length of 82 kilometers. The whole expressway was opened to traffic on 28 December 2003.

== History ==
Construction of southeastern section started in 1996 and was completed and opened to traffic on 8 December 1998. This section is a two-way six-lane expressway with a design speed of 120 km/h.

The western section is a two-way four-lane expressway with a design speed of 100 km/h. Construction started in 2001 and was completed and opened to traffic in December 2003.

Construction of the northeastern section started in 2001 and was completed and opened to traffic in December 2003. This section is a two-way four-lane expressway with a design speed of 100 km/h.
