= G72 Quanzhou–Nanning Expressway =

Road in China

Quanzhou–Nanning Expressway
- 泉州－南宁高速公路
- Quannan Expressway 泉南高速公路

Route information
- Length: 1,635 km (1,016 mi)

Major junctions
- East end: G15 Shenyang–Haikou Expressway, Jinjiang, Quanzhou, Fujian
- West end: G75 Lanzhou–Haikou Expressway, G80 Guangzhou–Kunming Expressway, G7201 Nanning Ring Expressway, and Minzu Avenue, Qingxiu District, Nanning, Guangxi

Location
- Country: China

Highway system
- National Trunk Highway System; Primary; Auxiliary; National Highways; Transport in China
← G7021	→ G7201

The Quanzhou–Nanning Expressway (Chinese: 泉州—南宁高速公路), designated as G72 and commonly referred to as the Quannan Expressway (Chinese: 泉南高速公路) is an east-west bound expressway that connects the cities of Quanzhou, Fujian, China, and Nanning, Guangxi, in China.

The entire expressway was completed on 16 January 2015.

The portion of the G72 which connects Guilin and Liuzhou is referred to as the Guiliu Expressway (Chinese: 桂柳高速公路).
