= Qingxiu, Nanning =

Qingxiu 青秀区 · Cinghsiu Gih
- District
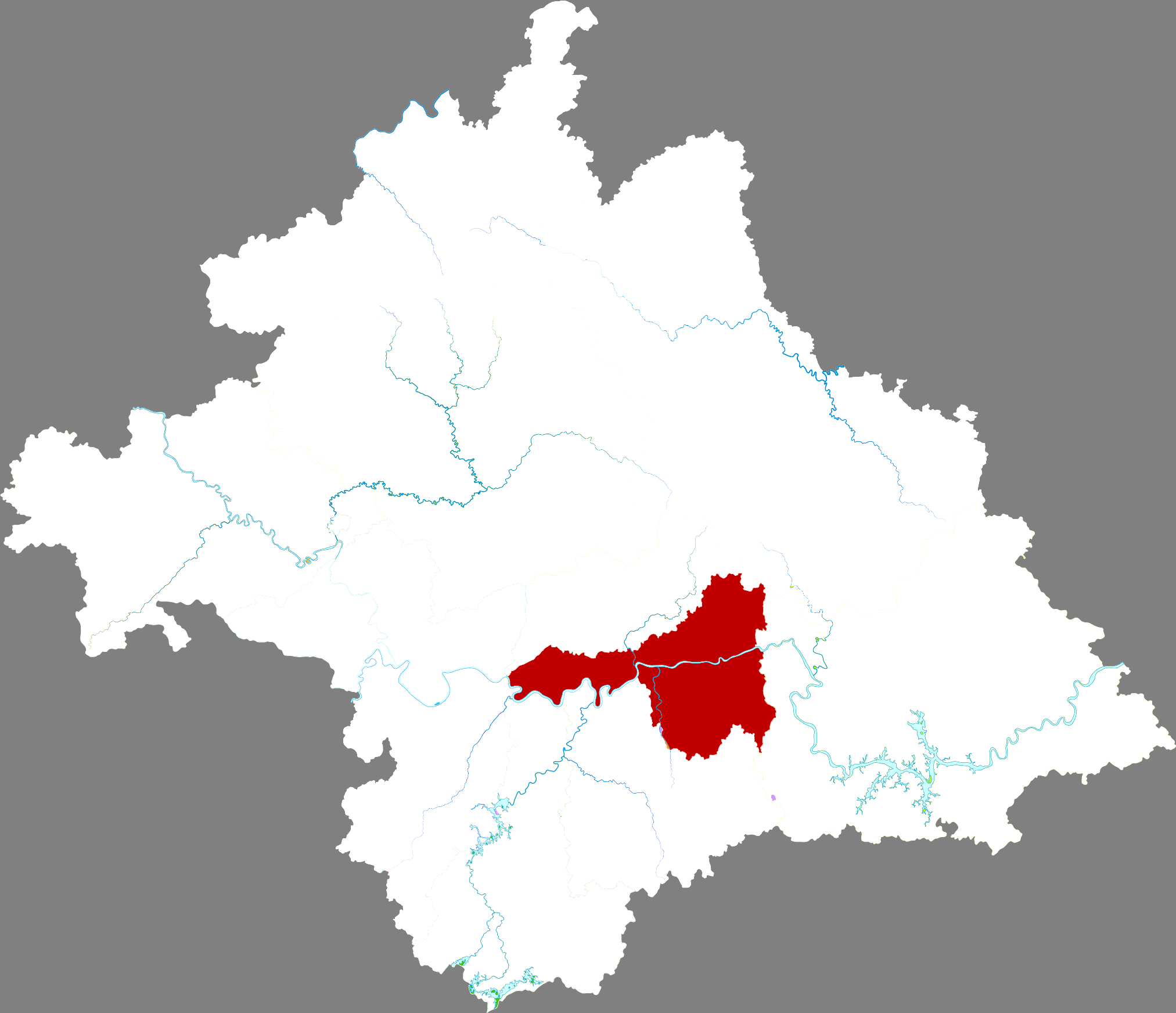
- Location in Nanning

- Location in Guangxi
- Coordinates: 22°48′54″N 108°20′48″E
- Country: China
- Autonomous region: Guangxi
- Prefecture-level city: Nanning
- District seat: Xinzhu Subdistrict

Area
  - Total: 872 km^{2} (337 sq mi)

Population (2020)
  - Total: 1,124,334
  - Density: 1,290/km^{2} (3,340/sq mi)
- Time zone: UTC+8 (China Standard)
- Website: www.qingxiu.gov.cn

Qingxiu District (simplified Chinese: 青秀区; traditional Chinese: 青秀區; pinyin: Qīngxiù Qū; Jyutping: cing^{1} sau^{3} keoi^{1}; Standard Zhuang: Cinghsiu Gih) is the county seat and one of 7 districts of the prefecture-level city of Nanning, the capital of Guangxi Zhuang Autonomous Region, South China. It is Xincheng District (新城区) approved to rename to the present name by the Chinese State Council on September 15, 2004.

== Administrative divisions ==
Qingxiu District is divided into 5 subdistricts and 4 towns:

- Xinzhu Subdistrict (新竹街道, Sinhcuz Gaihdau)
- Zhongshan Subdistrict (中山街道, Cunghsanh Gaihdau)
- Jianzheng Subdistrict (建政街道, Gencwng Gaihdau)
- Nanhu Subdistrict (南湖街道, Nanzhuz Gaihdau)
- Jintou Subdistrict (津头街道, Cinhdouz Gaihdau)
- Liuxu Town (刘圩镇, Liuzhih Cin)
- Nanyang Town (南阳镇, Nanzyangz Cin)
- Lingli Town (伶俐镇, Lingzli Cin)
- Changtang Town (长塘镇, Cangzdangz Cin)
