= G7511 Qinzhou–Dongxing Expressway =

Expressway in Guangxi, China

Qinzhou–Dongxing Expressway
- 钦州－东兴高速公路
- Qindong Expressway 钦东高速公路

Route information
- Auxiliary route of G75

Major junctions
- Northeast end: G75 Lanzhou–Haikou Expressway, Qinnan District, Qinzhou, Guangxi
- Southwest end: in Dongxing, Fangchenggang, Guangxi

Location
- Country: China

Highway system
- National Trunk Highway System; Primary; Auxiliary; National Highways; Transport in China
← G75	→ G7512

The G7511 Qinzhou–Dongxing Expressway (Chinese: 钦州—东兴高速公路), commonly referred to as the Qindong Expressway (Chinese: 钦东高速公路), is an expressway in China that connects Qinzhou, Guangxi and Dongxing, Guangxi. The expressway is a spur of G75 Lanzhou–Haikou Expressway and is entirely in Guangxi Province.

Dongxing is on the China–Vietnam border and there is a border crossing between Dongxing and Mong Cai. There will be a direct connection to the CT06 Haiphong–Ha Long–Van Don–Mong Cai Expressway. Currently, the expressway is complete only from Qinzhou to Gangkou District, Fangchenggang.

The expressway connects the following cities, all of which are in Guangxi Province:

- Qinzhou
- Fangchenggang
- Dongxing
