= G75 Lanzhou–Haikou Expressway =

Expressway in China

Lanzhou–Haikou Expressway
- 兰州－海口高速公路
- Lanhai Expressway 兰海高速公路

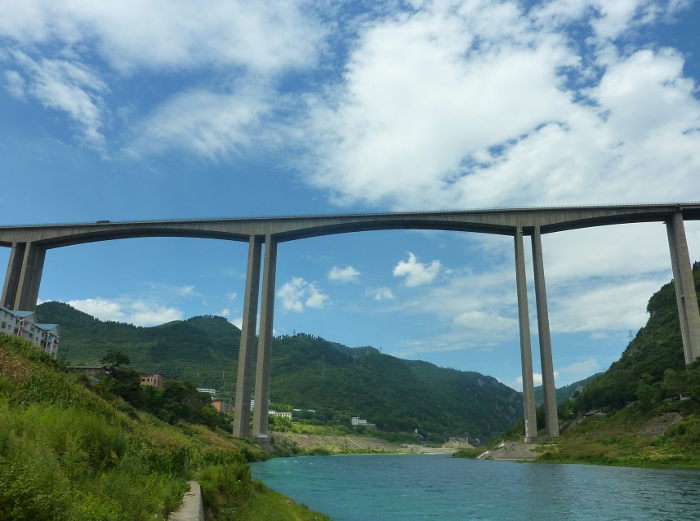
- The expressway crossing the Wujiang Viaduct over the Wu River in Guizhou

Route information
- Length: 2,570 km (1,600 mi) Length when complete.

Major junctions
- North end: China National Highway 212 and South Langongping Street, Lanzhou, Gansu
- South end: Haikou, Hainan (when complete); G15 Shenyang–Haikou Expressway, Zhanjiang, Guangdong (current)

Location
- Country: China

Highway system
- National Trunk Highway System; Primary; Auxiliary; National Highways; Transport in China
← G7221	→ G7511

The Lanzhou–Haikou Expressway (Chinese: 兰州—海口高速公路), designated as G75 and commonly referred to as the Lanhai Expressway (Chinese: 兰海高速公路), is an expressway in China that connects the cities of Lanzhou, Gansu, and Haikou, Hainan. When fully complete, it will be 2,570 km (1,600 mi) in length. It is one of the most important routes between Northwest China and the Southwest, and considered one of the developmental axes of Development of Western China.

== Route ==
=== Gansu ===
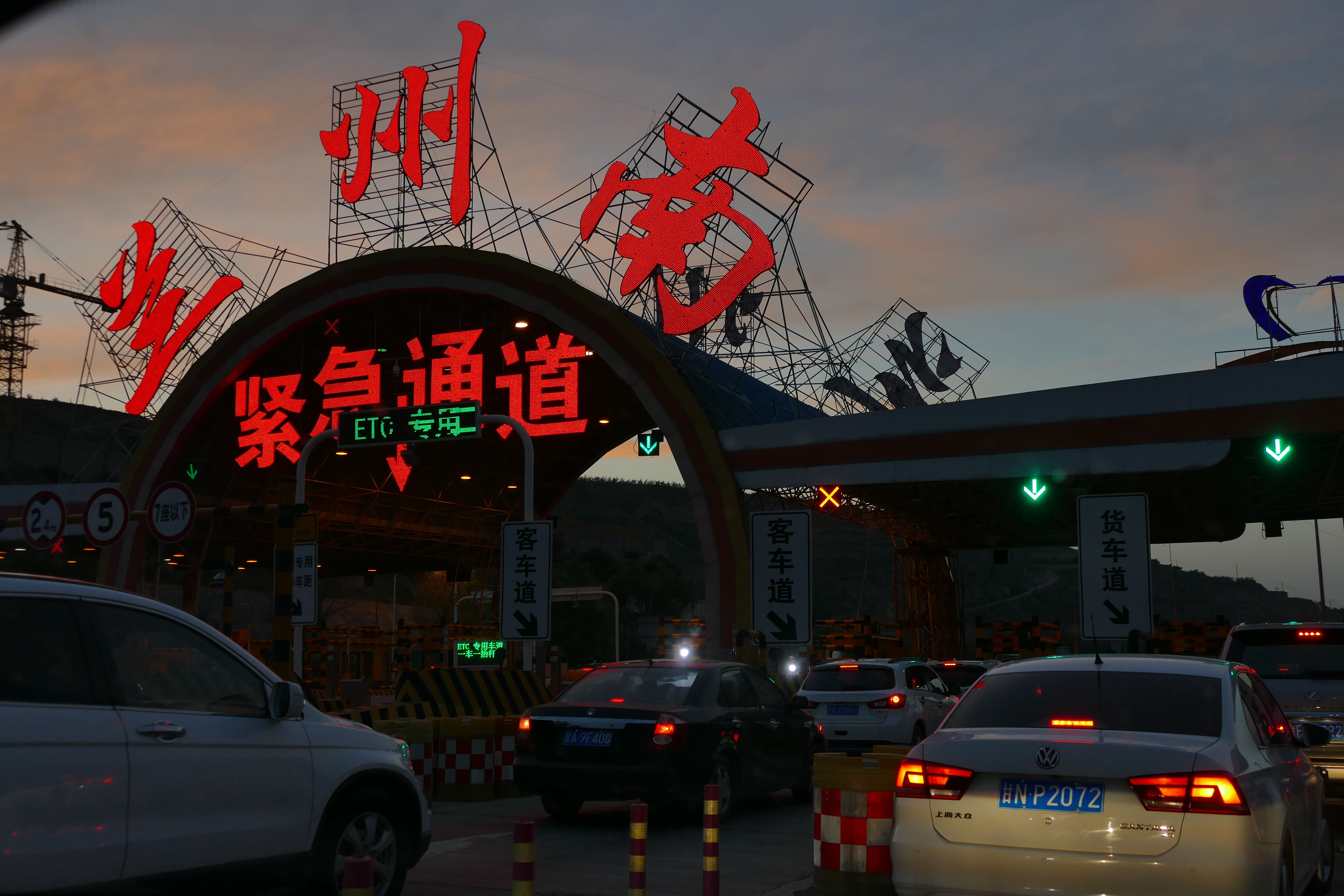
The northern terminus of G75 at Lanzhou South toll station

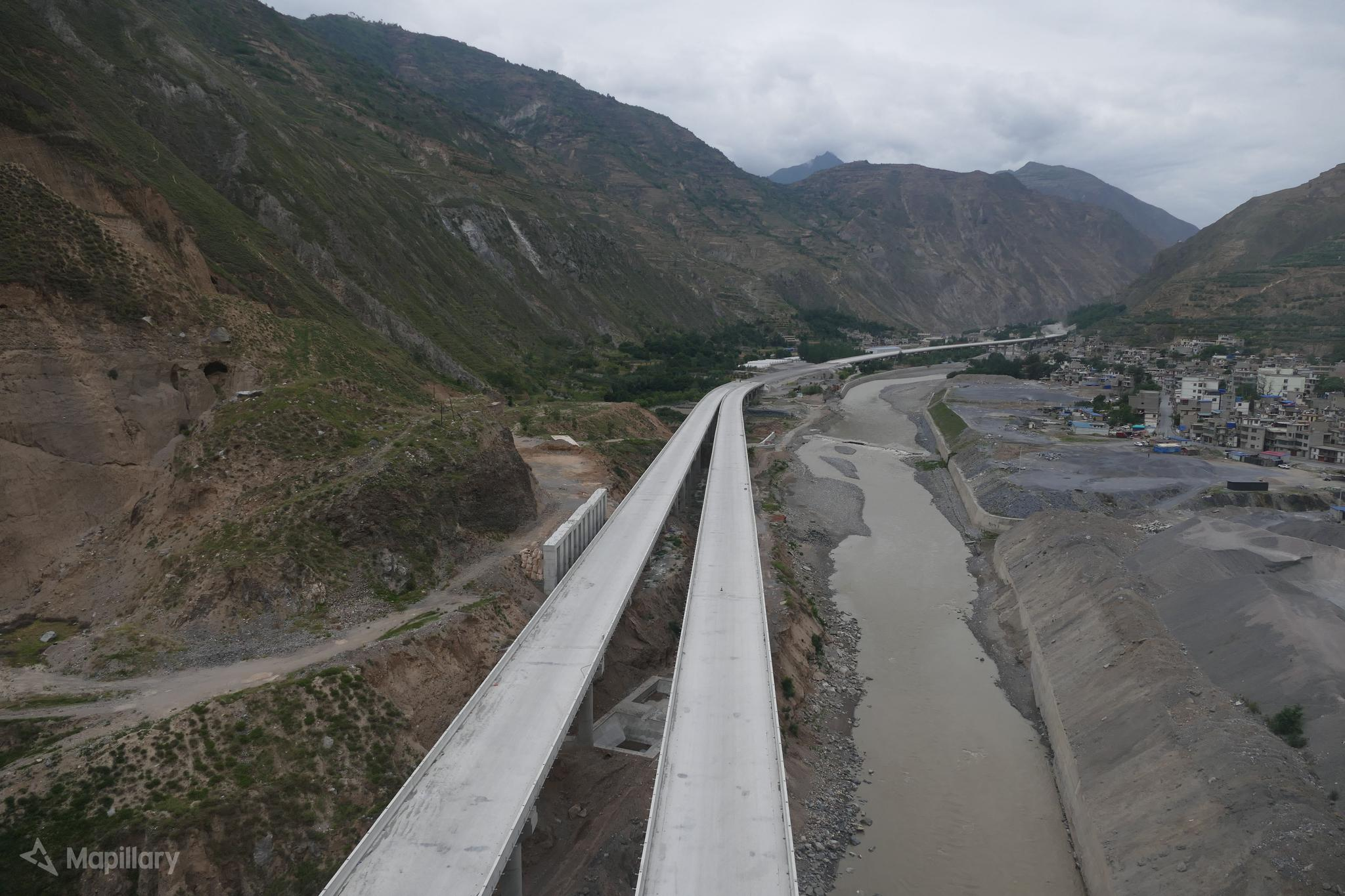
Under construction near Wudu

G75 was fully completed in Gansu with the opening of the Wudu-Weiyuan section on 1 January 2021.

Starting from the south of Lanzhou, the expressway enters the New Qidaoliang tunnel (length 4,070 metres (2.53 mi)) through the Xinglongshan mountains, from where it follows the Tao River parallel to G212. Past Lintao, the route diverges from the Tao river valley and passes through hilly landscape through a couple of tunnels until exiting in the Wei River valley. From there it continues through the 15.2 kilometres (9.4 miles) long Muzhailing Tunnel. In Min County, the expressway parallels G212 again until Longnan, exiting Gansu through a mountainous valley by numerous tunnels and viaducts.

=== Sichuan ===
The expressway is under construction from the Gansu border to Nanchong, and complete from Nanchong to the Chongqing border.

=== Chongqing ===
The expressway is complete in Chongqing.

=== Guizhou ===
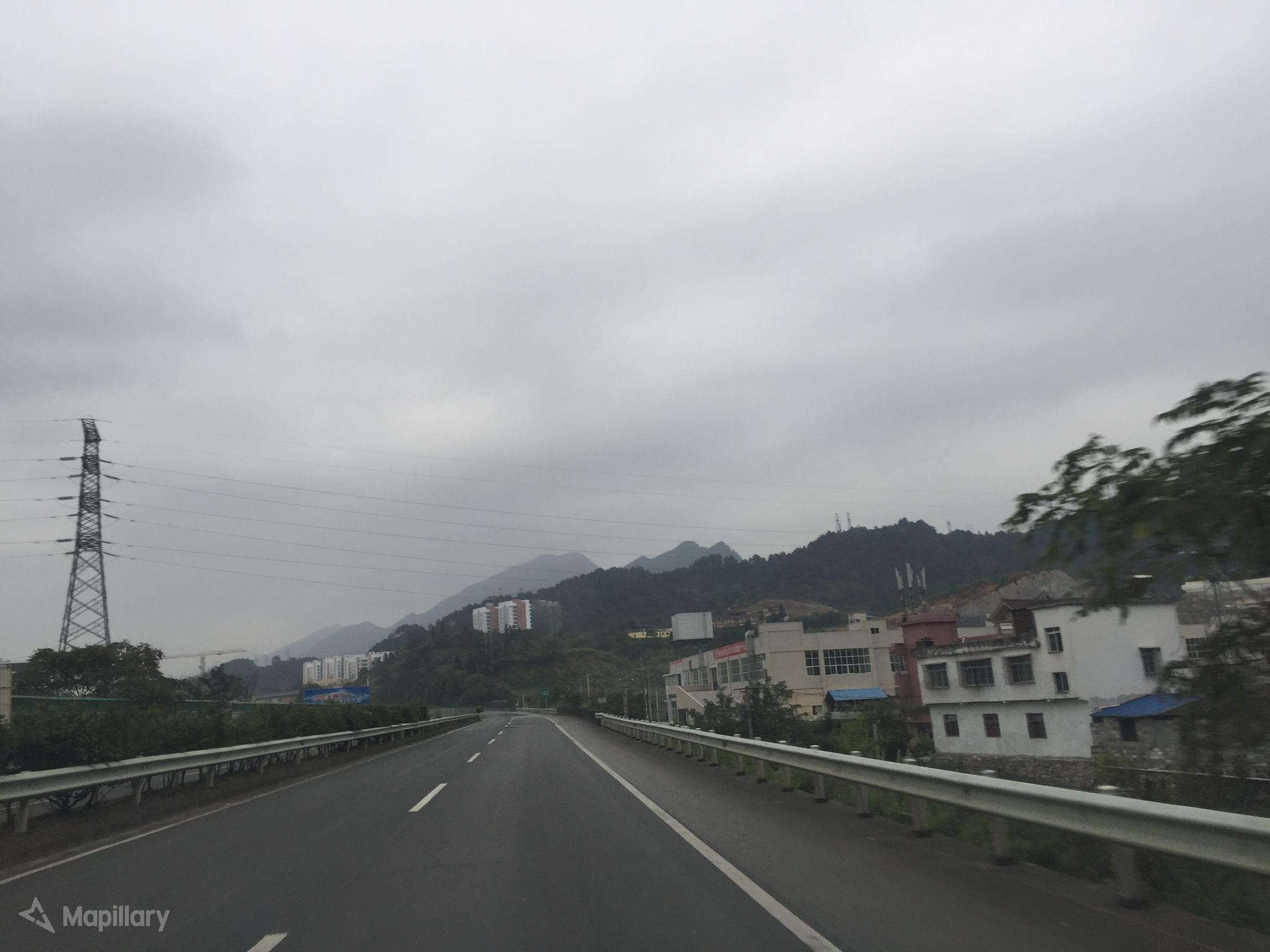
G75 near Duyun

The expressway is complete in Guizhou. The portion of it connecting Guiyang and Zunyi is referred to as the Kaima Expressway.

=== Guangxi ===
The expressway is under construction from the Guizhou border to Du'an Yao Autonomous County, and complete from Du'an to the Guangdong border.

=== Guangdong ===
The expressway is complete from the Guangxi border to Zhanjiang. At Zhanjiang, the expressway is under construction as the fixed bridge link from Guangdong to Hainan is still under construction.

=== Hainan ===
When completed, the southern terminus of the expressway will be in Haikou, Hainan. Hainan is an island and currently not connected to the rest of Mainland China by a fixed road link. A bridge is being built over the Qiongzhou Strait, separating Guangdong from Hainan and will carry the Lanzhou–Haikou Expressway to Hainan.

As of December 2022, only the collinear section with G15, within Haikou city, is opened for service.

== Major accidents ==
The northern terminus of G75 in Lanzhou has been the site of hundreds of accidents, totaling at least 42 deaths since 2012. Over a distance of 17 kilometres (11 mi), the road descends 1,057 metres (3,468 ft). Trucks having brake failure or being overloaded, and drunk drivers cause most of the accidents. The toll station is located several kilometers from the actual terminus of the expressway to reduce the severity of accidents. With the opening of the Lanzhou South Ring Expressway, heavy trucks are not allowed on the downhill section any more.

On 7 November 2015, a truck caught fire in the Qinggangshao tunnel between Chongqing and Zunyi. The driver managed to drive the burning truck out of the tunnel to a safe parking spot, preventing any injuries.

On 9 November 2015, two trucks collided with a bus in Wusheng, resulting in 6 deaths and 26 injured people.

== Detailed Itinerary ==
From North to South
G15 Shenhai Expressway; S75 Lanhai Expressway Zhanjiang Branch
Concurrent with G15 Shenhai Expressway
S374 Road; Zhanhai-West
X684 Road; Towards G207 Road; Chengyue
Suixi Service Area
G207 Road; Leizhou
Baisha Service Area
S373 Road; Leizhou-Yangjia
X692 Road; Towards G207 Road; Songzhu
Leizhou Service Area
X699 Road; Towards G207 Road; Towards S290 Road; Longmen
X699 Road; Towards G207 Road; Towards S290 Road; Yingli-Tandou
X331 Road; Towards G207 Road; Xiaqiao
Xucheng Toll Station
G207 Road; Xuwen
Planned to be continued to Hainan Province
From South to North
