= Hanoi–Thai Nguyen Expressway =

Road in Vietnam

CT.07 Expressway
- Hanoi–Thai Nguyen Expressway
- Đường cao tốc Hà Nội - Thái Nguyên
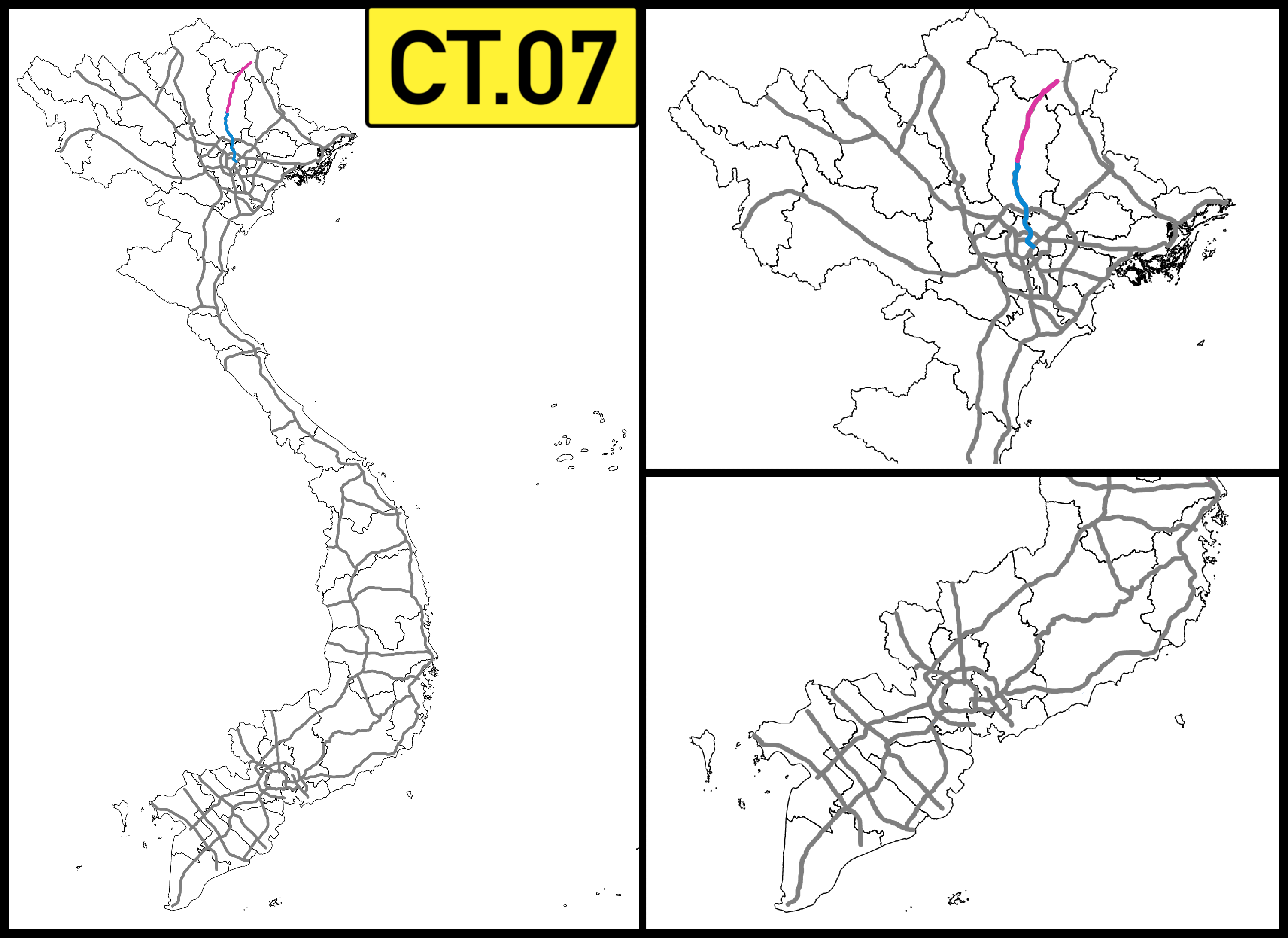

Route information
- Length: 70 km (43 mi)
- Existed: 18 May 2014–present

Major junctions
- South end: / in Gia Lâm District, Hanoi
- North end: / in Thái Nguyên

Location
- Country: Vietnam

Highway system
- Transport in Vietnam
← CT.06	→ CT.08

The Hanoi–Thai Nguyen Expressway (Vietnamese: Đường cao tốc Hà Nội–Thái Nguyên) is an expressway in Vietnam. It connects Hanoi with Thái Nguyên. The maximum speed is 100 km/h and the expressway has 4 lanes.

== Development ==
Thai Nguyen is a major industrial center of the Red River Delta. The expressway improves access between factories and cargo hubs such as Noi Bai International Airport, Hai Phong Port and Ha Long Port, forming a faster, higher capacity alternative to. The investment budget was a 10,000 billion VND, with about two thirds of that amount being Japanese development loans, the rest financed by the Vietnamese government.

Construction started in 2009 and was completed in 2014. In 2018 it was reported that several long sections of the road had severe rutting and subsidence, which had to be repaired the same year. In 2019, additional repairs for the same issue had to be carried out.
