= Hải An district =

Hải An district Quận Hải An
- Urban district
- Interactive map of Hải An district
- Location within Vietnam
- Coordinates: 20°49′38″N 106°45′57″E
- Country: Vietnam
- Municipality: Haiphong

Area
  - Total: 88.39 km^{2} (34.13 sq mi)

Population (2019)
  - Total: 132,943
  - Density: 1,504/km^{2} (3,895/sq mi)

Hải An is a former urban district (quận) of Hai Phong, the third largest city of Vietnam.

== Economy ==
Hải An is the headquarters of Z189, one of Vietnam's largest shipyards.

== Geography ==
Hai An District is located in the eastern part of Hai Phong city, with the following geographical boundaries:

- East: Adjacent to Cat Hai District and Quang Yen Town in Quang Ninh Province
- West: Bordered by Ngo Quyen District
- South: Adjacent to Duong Kinh District and the Gulf of Tonkin
- North: Bordered by Thuy Nguyen City

== Administration ==
Hai An District comprises eight administrative units at the ward level, including the wards: Cat Bi, Dang Lam, Dang Hai, Dong Hai 1, Dong Hai 2, Nam Hai, Thanh To, and Trang Cat.

== History ==
- December 16, 1901: The Governor-General of Tonkin issued a decree separating certain communes of An Duong District from Phu Lien Province (later renamed Kien An Province) to form the suburban area of Hai Phong.
- February 29, 1924: The French colonial government abolished the suburban area of Hai Phong, returning the communes to Kien An Province to establish Hai An District.
- April 7, 1966: The Government issued Decision No. 67-CP to establish An Hai District by merging Hai An and An Duong Districts.
- December 20, 2002: The Government issued Decree No. 106/2002/ND-CP, establishing Hai An District by separating five communes—Dang Lam, Dang Hai, Dong Hai, Nam Hai, Trang Cat—from An Hai District and adding Cat Bi Ward from Ngo Quyen District. These communes were subsequently upgraded to wards with corresponding names. At this time, Hai An District covered an area of 8,838.97ha with a population of 69,862, organized into six wards: Cat Bi, Dang Lam, Dang Hai, Dong Hai, Nam Hai, and Trang Cat.
- April 5, 2007: The Government issued Decree No. 54/2007/ND-CP, dividing Dong Hai Ward into Dong Hai 1 and Dong Hai 2 wards. Dang Lam Ward was also split to create two wards: Dang Lam and Thanh To. Additionally, 45.80 ha of Cat Bi Ward, with a population of 8,240, were transferred to the newly established Thanh To Ward.
- October 24, 2024: The Standing Committee of the National Assembly issued Resolution No. 1232/NQ-UBTVQH15 on restructuring district- and ward-level administrative units in Hai Phong for the 2023–2025 period (effective January 1, 2025). Under this resolution:
  1. 7.27km² of Dong Hai 1 Ward was transferred to Thuy Trieu Commune in Thuy Nguyen District.
  2. After the adjustment, Hai An District’s area became 97.64km², with a population of 144,256.

Since these adjustments, Hai An District has maintained its structure of 8 wards as it exists today

== Population ==
- In 2019, Hai An District had an area of 103.7km² and a population of 132,943, with a population density of 1,282 people/km²
- By December 31, 2022, the district’s area had increased slightly to 104.91km², with a population of 138,869, giving a density of 1,323 people/km²
- As of January 1, 2025, Hai An District has an area of 97.64km² and a population of 144,256, with a density of 1,477 people/km²

== Transportation ==
Traffic on Le Hong Phong Street (in Hai An District) showcases the district's role as a significant transportation hub in Hai Phong. Hai An hosts key transport connections across roads, waterways, rail, and air, with Lach Tray and Cam rivers surrounding the area and flowing into the Gulf of Tonkin via the Nam Trieu estuary.

The district serves as the endpoint of the Hanoi–Hai Phong Expressway and is also traversed by National Highway 5, which connects Hanoi to Hai Phong. Major city roads such as Tran Hung Dao, Le Hong Phong, and the routes to Dinh Vu Island and Cat Ba Island also pass through Hai An. The district features various ports, including Chua Ve Port, Cua Cam Port, a military port, and other specialized ports. The railway line from Lac Vien Station to Chua Ve Port also crosses the district.

Cat Bi International Airport, located in Hai An, has an annual capacity of 2 million passengers and nearly 12,000 tons of cargo. This valuable infrastructure advantage positions the district as a strategic area for socio-economic development.

== Streets ==
- 7 tháng 3
- An Khê
- An Kim Hải
- An Trung
- Bắc Trung Hành
- Bạch Thái Bưởi
- Bảo Phúc
- Bến Láng
- Bình Kiều
- Bùi Thị Từ Nhiên
- Bùi Viện
- Cát Bi
- Cát Khê
- Cát Linh
- Cát Vũ
- Chợ Lũng
- Chùa Vẽ
- Cống Đen
- Đà Nẵng
- Đằng Hải
- Đặng Kinh
- Đình Vũ
- Đoàn Chuẩn
- Đoạn Xá
- Đông An
- Đông Hải
- Đông Mỹ
- Đông Phong
- Đông Trung Hành
- Hạ Đoạn
- Hạ Lũng
- Hàng Tổng
- Hào Khê
- Hoàng Thế Thiện
- Kiều Hạ
- Kiều Sơn
- Lê Đức Thịnh
- Lê Hồng Phong
- Lũng Bắc
- Lũng Đông
- Lương Khê
- Lý Hồng Nhật
- Mạc Đình Phúc
- Mạc Thái Tổ
- Mai Trung Thứ
- Nam Hải
- Nam Hải Đông
- Nam Hòa
- Nam Hùng
- Nam Hưng
- Nam Phong
- Nam Thành
- Nam Trung Hành
- Ngô Gia Tự
- Ngô Hùng
- Nguyễn Bỉnh Khiêm
- Nguyễn Đồn
- Nguyễn Khoa Dục
- Nguyễn Lân
- Nguyễn Thị Thuận
- Nguyễn Thiếp
- Nguyễn Văn Hới
- Nhà Mạc
- Nhà Thờ Xâm Bồ
- Phú Lương
- Phủ Thượng Đoạn
- Phú Xá
- Phương Lưu
- Tân Vũ
- Tây Khê
- Tây Trung Hành
- Thành Tô
- Thống Nhất
- Thư Trung
- Tiền Phong
- Tô Vũ
- Trần Đông
- Trần Hoàn
- Trần Văn Giang
- Trần Văn Lan
- Tràng Cát
- Trung Hành
- Trung Lực
- Từ Lương Xâm
- Văn Cao
- Vĩnh Lưu
- Vườn Hồng
